= Parliament of Upper Canada =

Legislature of the Province of Upper Canada

Type
- Type: Bicameral
- Houses: Legislative Council; Legislative Assembly

History
- Founded: 1791
- Disbanded: 1841
- Preceded by: Council for the Affairs of the Province of Quebec
- Succeeded by: Parliament of the Province of Canada

The Parliament of Upper Canada was the legislature for the government of Upper Canada, a British colony in British North America that existed from 1791 to 1841. Upper Canada was created when the old Province of Quebec was divided into Upper Canada and Lower Canada by the Constitutional Act of 1791. (Note: Constitution Act 1791 was the colloquial short title commonly used in Canada, but a legally sanctioned one until 1985. The legally sanctioned short title for the act was The Clergy Endowments (Canada) Act, 1791.) The act laid out the basic structure of the colonial government, including the Parliament of Upper Canada and the two chambers within it. The Parliament was in operation between 1792 and 1841.

Modelled after the Parliament of United Kingdom, the Parliament of Upper Canada consisted of three components:

- The Crown of the United Kingdom – represented by the Lieutenant Governor of Upper Canada, who was assisted and advised by a council of ministers, the Executive Council of Upper Canada
- The Legislative Council of Upper Canada – the upper chamber with members who were appointed for life
- The House of Assembly of Upper Canada – the lower chamber with no less than sixteen members to be elected from electoral divisions determined by the Lieutenant Governor

Despite its design, the Parliament of Upper Canada failed to deliver the key promise of Westminster system – a executive accountable to the a legislature representing the power of the purse. Due to the heavily overlapping membership between the Legislative Council and the Executive Council, and to the Family Compact's dominance in these two councils, a small clique of elites with extensive family ties and holding the key government posts were able to exercise government authority while routinely disregarding the will of the elected lower house, the House of Assembly of Upper Canada. As observed by Earl of Durham in his consequential report, the parliament's upper chamber, the Legislative Council, was "practically hardly any thing but a veto in the hands of public functionaries on all the acts of that popular branch of the legislature in which they were always in a minority. This veto they used without much scruple."

Following the Rebellions of 1837 and Lord Durham's 1839 Report to the British Government, Upper Canada and Lower Canada were rejoined in 1841 to create the Province of Canada. The Parliament of Upper Canada was therewith replaced by the newly created Parliament of the United Province of Canada.

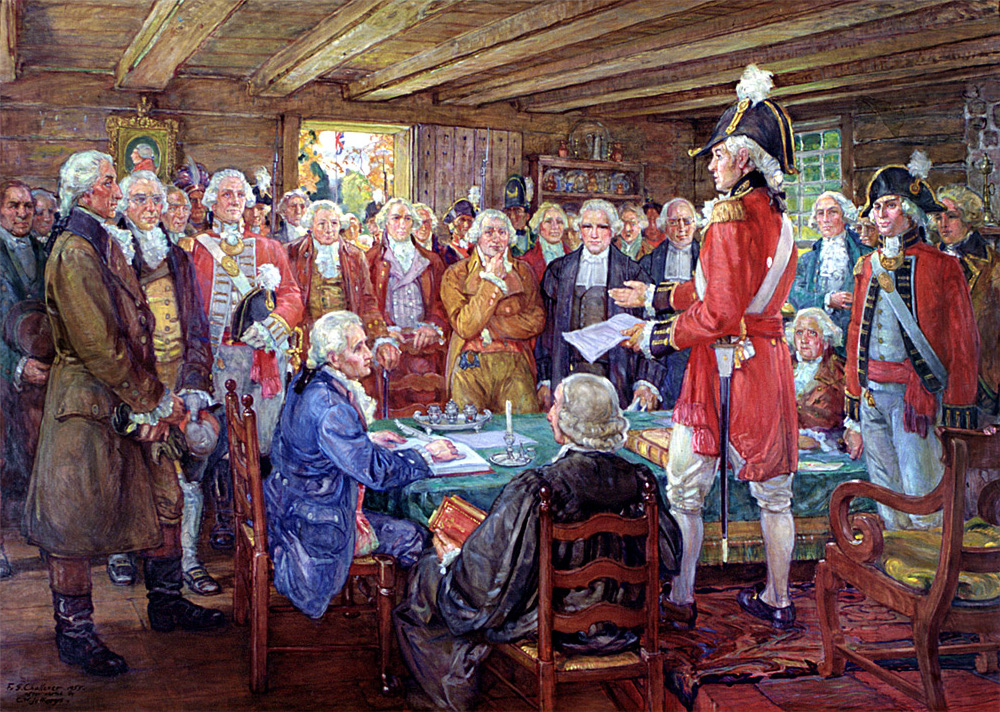
The first legislature of Upper Canada, by Frederick Challener

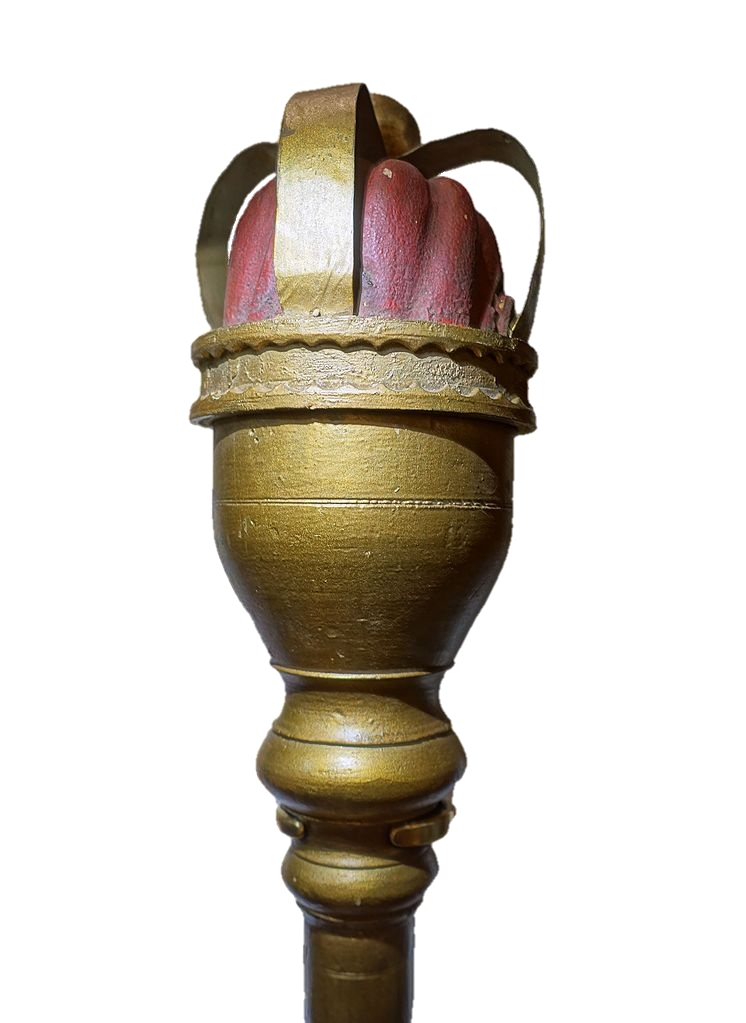
The First ceremonial mace of Upper Canada

== List of parliaments ==
Over the fifty-year lifespan of Upper Canada, its parliament convened over thirteen parliamentary terms.

Parl	Election	Convened	Dissolved	Sess.	Mems.	Speaker	Lt. Governor
1st	August 1792	Sept. 17, 1792	July 1, 1796	5	16	Captain John McDonell	John Graves; Simcoe
2nd	August 1796	June 1, 1797	July 7, 1800	4	16	David William Smith (1797–1800); Samuel Street (from June 5, 1800	John Graves; Simcoe
2nd	August 1796	June 1, 1797	July 7, 1800	4	16	David William Smith (1797–1800); Samuel Street (from June 5, 1800	Peter; Hunter
3rd	July 1800	May 28, 1801	May 14, 1804	4	19	David William Smith (1st & 2nd sess.); Richard Beasley (3rd & 4th sess.)	Peter; Hunter
4th	May 1804	Feb. 2, 1805	May 21, 1808	4	19	Alexander Macdonell	Peter; Hunter
4th	May 1804	Feb. 2, 1805	May 21, 1808	4	19	Alexander Macdonell	Francis; Gore
5th	May 1808	Feb. 2, 1809	May 1, 1812	4	25	Samuel Street	Francis; Gore
6th	June 1812	July 27, 1812	April 18, 1816	5	25	Allan McLean	Francis; Gore
7th	July 1816	Feb. 4, 1817	May 20, 1820	5	25	Allan McLean	Francis; Gore
7th	July 1816	Feb. 4, 1817	May 20, 1820	5	25	Allan McLean	Sir Peregrine; Maitland
8th	July 1820	Jan. 31, 1821	June 22, 1824	4	40	Levius Peters Sherwood	Sir Peregrine; Maitland
9th	July 1824	Jan. 13, 1825	June 24, 1828	4	44	John Wilson	Sir Peregrine; Maitland
10th	July 1828	Jan. 8, 1829	(Note: dissolution upon demise of the Crown, King George IV)Sept. 8, 1830	2	48	Marshall Spring Bidwell	Sir John; Colborne (Note: enobled as Baron Seaton upon return to England)
11th	October 1830	Jan. 7, 1831	Sept. 1, 1834	4	52	Archibald McLean	Sir John; Colborne
12th	October 1834	Jan. 15, 1835	(Note: Dissolution orderd by Lieutenant Governor, Sir Francis Bond Head following the assembly's refusal of supply)May 28, 1836	2	61	Marshall Spring Bidwell	Sir John; Colborne
12th	October 1834	Jan. 15, 1835	May 28, 1836	2	61	Marshall Spring Bidwell	Sir Francis B. Head
13th	June 1836	Nov. 8, 1836	(Note: Legislation was enacted in March 1837 to prevent dissolution of parliament upon the demise of William IV in June 1837)Feb 10, 1840	5	62	Archibald McLean (1st sess.); Allan MacNab (from 2nd sess.) (Note: Henry Ruttan acting 1837-12-28 to 1838-01-24 during MacNab's absence))	Sir Francis B. Head
13th	June 1836	Nov. 8, 1836	Feb 10, 1840	5	62	Archibald McLean (1st sess.); Allan MacNab (from 2nd sess.)	Sir George Arthur (Note: created a baronet upon return to England)
13th	June 1836	Nov. 8, 1836	Feb 10, 1840	5	62	Archibald McLean (1st sess.); Allan MacNab (from 2nd sess.)	Charles P. Thomson (Note: enobled as Baron Sydenham soon after the union of Upper and Lower Canadas)

The 7th and the 10th parliaments were dissolved upon the demise of the Crown, respectively the death of King George III in 1820 and of his son King George IV in 1830. Both occurred decades before the operation of transatlantic telegraph, therefore the demise were not formally proclaimed in the province until weeks after the actual death of the monarchs. By the time the news of the passing of George III arrived, the 7th Parliament had already prorogued its fifth session, so the proclamation caused no real change to the parliamentary cycle. It did however prompted a formal communications from the Government House in Quebec to the Montreal Herald confirming the validity of all legislative actions taken before the formal notice of the demise. The demise of George IV in the summer of 1830 triggered the general election in October that year.

The 12th Parliament was dissolved early by Sir Francis Bond Head when upon its refusal to provide supply in protest of Head's disregard of the advice of the Reform Party executive councillors. With Head's overt support, conservatives secured a working majority in the 13th Parliament, and proceed to pre-empt the operation of the demise of the Crown with legislation preventing dissolution, enacted by Head in March 1937, just in time to forestall dissolution upon the death of William IV three months later. The tactical victory was short-lived and contributed further to discontent among reformers. Events eventually led to the armed rebellion starting in December 1837. Head was recalled by the Whig government in London soon after.

In the table above, the columns with headings "Mems." and "Speaker" display information specific to the House of Assembly. For further information about the assembly's composition and its evolution, please see the article House of Assembly of Upper Canada and the articles of the specific parliamentary terms, linked under the column heading "Parl."

The term "riding", in modern day the most commonly used colloquial term to denote a electoral division or district in Canada, was introduced to Upper Canada initially for the purpose of defining judicial districts, not electoral ones. The 1792 royal proclamation that prescribed the province's original sixteen electoral divisions also defined nineteen counties, and eight ridings as subdivisions of three counties. Of the eight ridings, only four were also used as electoral districts.

The membership and speakership of the Legislative Council were not dependent on the lifecycle of parliamentary terms. Please see the article Legislative Council of Upper Canada for further information its membership composition and its speakership.

== Location and host structure ==
The Parliament of Upper Canada convened in the capital of the province, which was located in Newark (today's Niagara-on-the-lake) during the 1st Parliament, and was relocated to the Town of York, later renamed Toronto in 1834, for the remainder twelve parliaments.

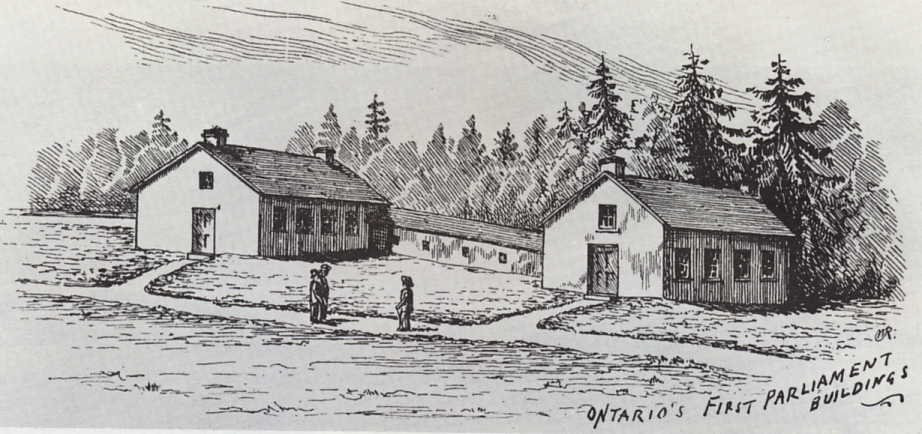
The first Parliament of Ontario (Upper Canada) in Toronto (York) on Front Street at Parliament Street, pre-1812

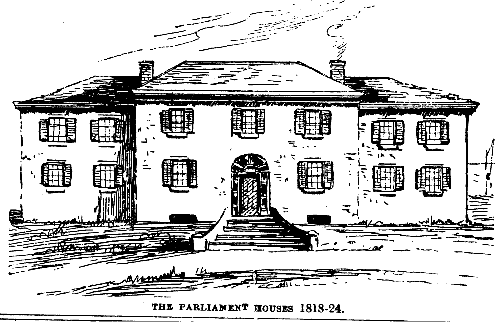
The second Parliament of Ontario (Upper Canada) in Toronto (York), 1818–1824

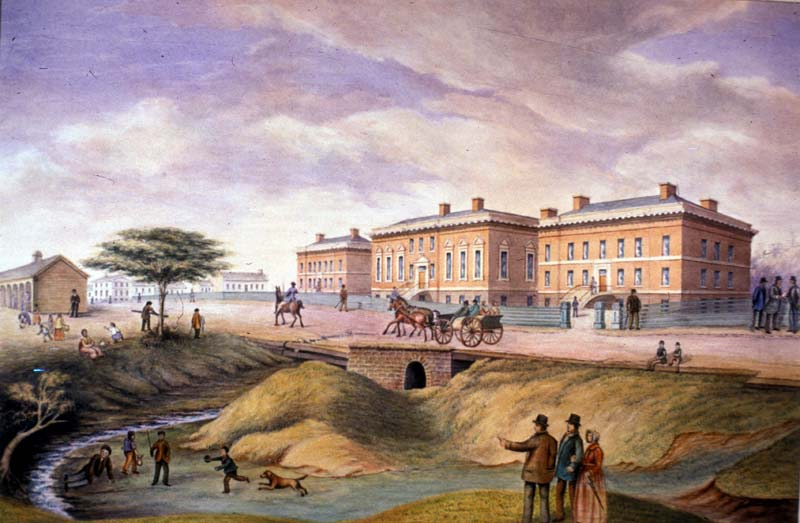
The third Parliament Building in York, 1832, on Front Street between Simcoe and John St.

Various locations were identified as being the site for the Parliament of Upper Canada while the provincial capital was located in Newark (today's Niagara-on-the-lake). Once the capital was moved to the town of York (today's Toronto), location of the assembly were more definitively documented.

Years	Location	Building & notes
1792-1796	Newark (Note: Present day Niagara-on-the-Lake)	Various mentioned, including: the Anchorage; Freemanson's Hall; Navy Hall (Official residence of LG Simcoe)
1796-1813	Town of York (until 1834) Toronto	Palace of Parliament, Front and Parliament Sts. (destroyed on 27 April 1813 by arson by American soldiers)
1814 (once)	Town of York (until 1834) Toronto	Jordan's York Holel, between King and Front Sts. (Note: Present day location of Toronto Sun Building)
1815-1820	Town of York (until 1834) Toronto	The Lawn, Wellington and York Sts. (Personal residence of Chief Justice William Henry Draper)
1820-1824	Town of York (until 1834) Toronto	Upper Canada's Second Parliament Building, Front & Parliament Sts. (Note: Structure located on same plot as Palace of Parliament but further northwest (King and Berkeley)) (Destroyed by accidental fire on 30 December 1824)
1825-1828	Town of York (until 1834) Toronto	The later York General Hospital, King and Hospital (Note: Present day Richmond Street) Sts. (Consequently delay the opening of the hospital)
1829-1832	Town of York (until 1834) Toronto	The former Court House, bordered by King/Church/Court/Toronto Sts. (South of present day location of the Courthouse Square Park)
1832-1840	Town of York (until 1834) Toronto	The later First Ontario Parliament Buildings, bordered by Front/John/Simcoe/Wellington Sts. (Note: Present day location of Metro Hall/CBC Broadcasting Centre) (third parliament building for Upper Canada)

The successor legislature, the Parliament of the Province of Canada, initially convened in Kingston, the capital of the newly united province, at the Alwington House, and would move numerous times in its short lifespan. The capital of the Province of Canada would returned to its former home in Toronto twice, between 1849 and 1851, and again between 1855 and 1859, with Upper Canada's third parliament building, known as the First Ontario Parliament Buildings, hosting its legislature during those periods. Upon Canadian Confederation, the building would house the legislature of the Province of Ontario, the Legislative Assembly of Ontario, until 1892.
