= Joshua Gwillen Doan =

Joshua Gwillen Doan (1811 – February 6, 1839) was a farmer and tanner who participated in the Upper Canada Rebellion of 1837.

He was born in the Sugar Loaf area (now within Port Colborne) of the Niagara District in 1811 to a family of Quakers who had left Pennsylvania before the start of the War of 1812. He began farming and then became a tanner when his brother opened a tannery in 1832. During 1837, he became a supporter of William Lyon Mackenzie. On December 9, 1837, with Charles Duncombe, he organized a group of men to join Mackenzie's revolt in Toronto, not realizing that the revolt had already been put down. On December 13, they were dispersed by loyalist troops led by Colonel Allan MacNab near Brantford.

Joshua escaped to the United States. In December 1838, he was part of a raid launched on Windsor by a group of refugees from the Rebellion known as Patriots. Several inhabitants and invaders were killed and a number of the Patriots, including Doan, were taken prisoner. (See Patriot War)

In January 1839, he was tried at London, Ontario, found guilty of treason and sentenced to death. He was hanged on February 6 in London.
