= Robert Moodie =

Robert Moodie may refer to:

- Rob Moodie (lawyer) (born 1938), New Zealand lawyer and cross dresser
- Rob Moodie (doctor) (born 1953), Australian doctor, previously CEO of the Victorian Health Promotion Foundation
- Robert Moodie (British Army officer) (1778–1837), British army officer who settled in Canada

== See also ==
- Robert Moody (born 1941), Canadian mathematician
- Robert M. Moody (born 1939), American bishop
- Robert Mudie (1777–1842), editor and author
