= Charles Duncombe (Upper Canada Rebellion) =

Canadian and American politician

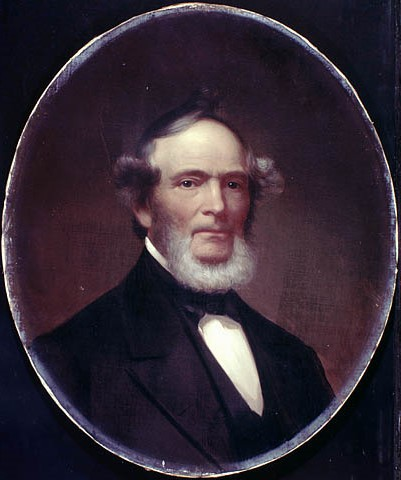
Dr. Charles Duncombe, c. 1840

Charles Duncombe (28 July 1792 – 1 October 1867) was a leader in the Upper Canada Rebellion in 1837 and subsequent Patriot War. He was an active Reform politician in the 1830s, and produced several important legislative reports on banking, lunatic asylums, and education.

== Early life ==
He was the eldest son of Thomas and Rhoda Tyrill Duncombe, born July 28, 1792, in Stratford, Connecticut. He studied medicine at the college of the One Hundred and One Members of the Medical Society of the City of New York, graduating in 1819. He then settled in Delaware, Upper Canada, and in 1824 he established the first medical school in Upper Canada with Dr John Rolph, in St. Thomas, under the patronage of Colonel Thomas Talbot.

== Freemasonry ==
Debates within Upper Canada on the nature of the relationship of the provincial Grand Lodge and the English Grand Lodge paralleled political discussions on the colony's constitution. Those Freemasons who immigrated from the United States favoured an independent Provincial Grand Lodge. Duncombe was a Freemason, serving as first master of the Mount Moriah lodge at Westminster. In 1836, in a move that presaged the Rebellion, he set up a Grand Lodge independent from the British lodges and became its first Grand Master.

Duncombe's Grand Lodge was short-lived, but he soon helped found another during the Patriot War that followed the Rebellion: the Hunters' Lodge. The Hunters' Lodge was patterned on Freemasonry.

His last known Masonic activity was to establish a Masonic lodge in Sacramento in 1852.

== Reform politics ==
=== Upper Canada Legislature ===
Duncombe was elected in 1830 to the Legislative Assembly as a representative for Oxford County. He was originally a Reformer in the same vein as Robert Baldwin, but was attracted by William Lyon Mackenzie's more radical reform movement.

In 1836, Duncombe made extensive reports to a parliamentary committee of reformers on prisons, asylums and education based on an extensive tour of American facilities. In his report on prisons, Duncombe argued crime was the result of social injustice, and not just the product of individual error. He argued that government had the responsibility to not merely punish the offender, but to rectify the social conditions that produced the offender. This, he argued, was particularly true for juvenile offenders. He viewed penitentiaries as "schools for criminals" and sought their eradication.

"Doctor Charles Duncombe's Report upon the Subject of Education, made to the Parliament of Upper Canada, 25th February, 1836." called for a radical expansion of common school education in the province. He rejected the grammar school model pursued by the Family Compact and argued for practical education; the classics were of limited use in the real world for which education should prepare students. A bill based on Duncombe's report passed the assembly on 4 April 1836, only to be rejected by the Family Compact-dominated legislative council. Many of its provisions, however, would be introduced under after the Rebellion including elective school boards, female education, creation of normal schools, prescribed textbooks, and non-sectarian religious instruction.

The 1836 provincial elections were marked by widespread violence by the Orange Order, and claims of voter fraud. The Lt. Governor, Sir Francis Bond Head was in charge of the elections but intervened directly in favour of the Tories in the campaign. The Reformers complained that he issued illegal land patents to new immigrants to entice them to vote for Tory candidates. When the new Tory dominated Assembly refused to hear their petition, Duncombe was charged with presenting it to the British government. He travelled to London, England in the summer of 1836 but was refused an audience by the Colonial Office. Duncombe was all the more disillusioned when his 14-year-old son was killed before his return in November. Like Samuel Lount, his fellow reform assemblyman and rebellion organizer, he virtually withdrew from public life in 1837.

=== Rebellion & Hunters' Lodges ===
In December 1837, Duncombe heard reports of Mackenzie's rebellion in Toronto. Duncombe, with Robert Alway, Finlay Malcolm, Eliakim Malcolm, Enoch Moore and Joshua Doan, gathered about 200 men on 8 December and marched towards Toronto; this is sometimes known as the Western Rising. A few hundred more rebels joined them on their march, but they dispersed near Hamilton on December 13 when they learned of Mackenzie's defeat, and that a militia under Colonel Allan MacNab was on their way to stop them. Duncombe and Eliakim Malcolm fled to the United States. Duncombe was a central organizer of the Hunters' Lodge, a secret Masonic-like military organization with its Grand Lodge in Cleveland. This organization inducted more than 40,000 men into lodges spread across the Great Lakes and St Lawrence region. They launched the Patriot War in 1838–39, almost bringing the United States and the United Kingdom to war. The organization also declared a provisional Republic of Canada at a convention in Cleveland in September 1838, at which Duncombe established a Republican Bank of Canada to finance the war. Duncombe remained there for the rest of his life, despite being pardoned in 1843. Joshua Doan was executed in 1839.

=== The Story of His Escape ===
     Main Article: The History of the County Brant, 1883, p. 395

Local History of Burford Township Ontario speaks of Dr. Charles Duncombe and his escape from Canada. A writer was able to give it from the statement of the gentleman who, by his intrepidity and knowledge of the Western part of the Ontario frontier, aided an escape and which recalls those of some of Scott's Jacobite heroes a century before. Charles Tilden, Uncle of Dr. Hagel of Toronto, Ontario, was, with several of the Hagel family among the Scotland insurgents. Living near Amherstberg, he happened to be specially well acquainted with the entire western frontier, and noticed that although Sir Francis Head's agents had placed guards all along the line to prevent the escape of "rebels", now that a month had passed from the first excitement, the vigilance was much relaxed. Tilden went to see Duncombe, who, in the depth of winter (January, 1838, was a specially cold season), was kept hid in a hay-loft, and supplied with food by stealth by those who left the house as if to feed the cattle. Tilden urged him to attempt escape disguised as a woman, which Duncombe's smooth round face rendered it possible enough. The attempt was dangerous; a reward had been offered for his head, and all over the country the noble savages [?] of the Grand River reserve were on the lookout for his scalp and the blood-money it would bring. They left the house next day in an old-fashioned farmers box sleigh. Tilden drove, Mrs. Shennick and Duncombe sat side by side, the latter disguised as an elderly farmer's wife. Mrs. Shennick's little girl, a child of nine years, was taught to address him as "Auntie". All day they drove along without molestation; at night they stopped at a country hotel, where there not being sufficient accommodation, Charles Tilden had to sleep in another a room for the hotel staff, while the three women had a room to themselves. Unable to sleep from the excitement of his position, Dr. Duncombe sat up all night. At early dawn they drove away breakfastless, and arrived after several hours' drive at the crossing place, which was at a village opposite what is now Marine City, Michigan. They drove into the yard of the tavern where were the soldiers of a party in command of a sergeant, posted there to watch the crossing place, and if possible arrest the "rebel Chief". Very calmly Tilden watered his horses, and then addressing the sergeant in command as "Captain", asked if the ice was safe. The sergeant asked whence he came. Tilden replied, truly enough, that he came from London, and he was going with his Aunt and Mother to visit some friends, whose names he mentioned, on the opposite coast of Michigan. The sergeant ordered one of his men to accompany them across the ice. Then they get half way for the rest of the river, the young soldier said that they could easily find their way for the rest of the track, and was about to leave them. Dr. Duncombe handed Charles Tilden fifty cents for the soldier, and while the latter was thanking them, felt very much inclined to send Dr. Duncombe's compliments to the sergeant who had furnished them with a guide, but refrained lest he should spoil the chance of some other unfortunate who might try the same stratagem for evading the blood-hounds of the Family Compact Government. In a few minutes he stood "a free man" on a free soil." They entered a store to buy some food, and Duncombe careless about preserving his disguise soon attracted attention. It became known that the Canadian Republican, Dr. Duncombe, a crowd gathered. He escaped capture, which in those days would have been certain death. He had a long and prosperous career in the U.S. lay before him. He was included in the general amnesty, and his Buford property was restored to him. Charles Tilden's son lived in possession of a farm of two hundred acres which Dr. Duncombe deeded to him as an acknowledgment of his father's generous friendship. Dr. Duncombe was the first known physician in Sacramento, California practicing medicine in 1851. He would later be elected to State Legislature in 1858, but was denied a seat for not being a citizen. He was elected the following year but was denied a seat. It was in 1862 he became a citizen, he took his place in the State Assembly.

=== Free Banking ===
Until 1835, all banks in Upper Canada required a legislative charter; this left them subject to political corruption and manipulation, as was the case with the largest of them, the Bank of Upper Canada. The Bank of Upper Canada was controlled by the Family Compact and used by them to control the province's money supply and trade. Reformers tried several legislative strategies, including attempts to incorporate credit unions such as the Farmers' Storehouse company. This came to an end in 1835 when Charles Duncombe produced a "Report on Currency" for the Legislative Assembly which demonstrated the legality of the Scottish joint-stock bank system in Upper Canada.

The difference between the English chartered banks and the Scottish joint stock banks is that the Scottish banks were considered partnerships and hence didn't need a legislated Act in order to operate. The joint stock banks thus lacked limited liability, and every partner in the bank was responsible for the bank's debts to the full extent of their personal property. The chartered banks, in contrast, protected their shareholders with limited liability and hence from major loss; they thus encouraged speculation. The Scottish joint-stock banks followed a "hard money policy." They avoided speculative risk because if they failed, their shareholders were responsible for the full loss. Since the banks did not require a legislated charter, many more banks could be founded, and they were more competitive and freer from political influence and corruption. Following Duncombe's report, the Farmers' Bank and the Bank of the People were founded on a joint stock basis, until the Family Compact conspired to make them illegal in 1838. The Bank of the People funded William Lyon Mackenzie newspaper, The Constitution in 1836.

Similar issues existed in the United States, where the chartered banks were accused of creating a "monied aristocracy" responsible for the financial panic of 1837–1838. The Equal Rights Party (the Locofocos) called for the introduction of the Scottish system, called by them "Free Banking". The Patriot War has been described as "Locofocoism with a Gun."

When the Hunters' Lodges held their convention in Cleveland in September 1838, Duncombe presented "An address to the Different Lodges on the Subject of a Joint-Stock Company Bank" in which he proposed financing the Patriot War with a republican bank. The bank was established for a short period.

Duncombe continued to pursue the idea of joint stock banking after the end of the Patriot War, publishing a lengthy book on the subject: Duncombe’s Free Banking: An essay on Banking, Currency, Finance, Exchanges and Political Economy (Cleveland: Sanford & Co., 1841). In it, he argued that a democratic state depended upon Free Banking.

=== California State Assembly ===
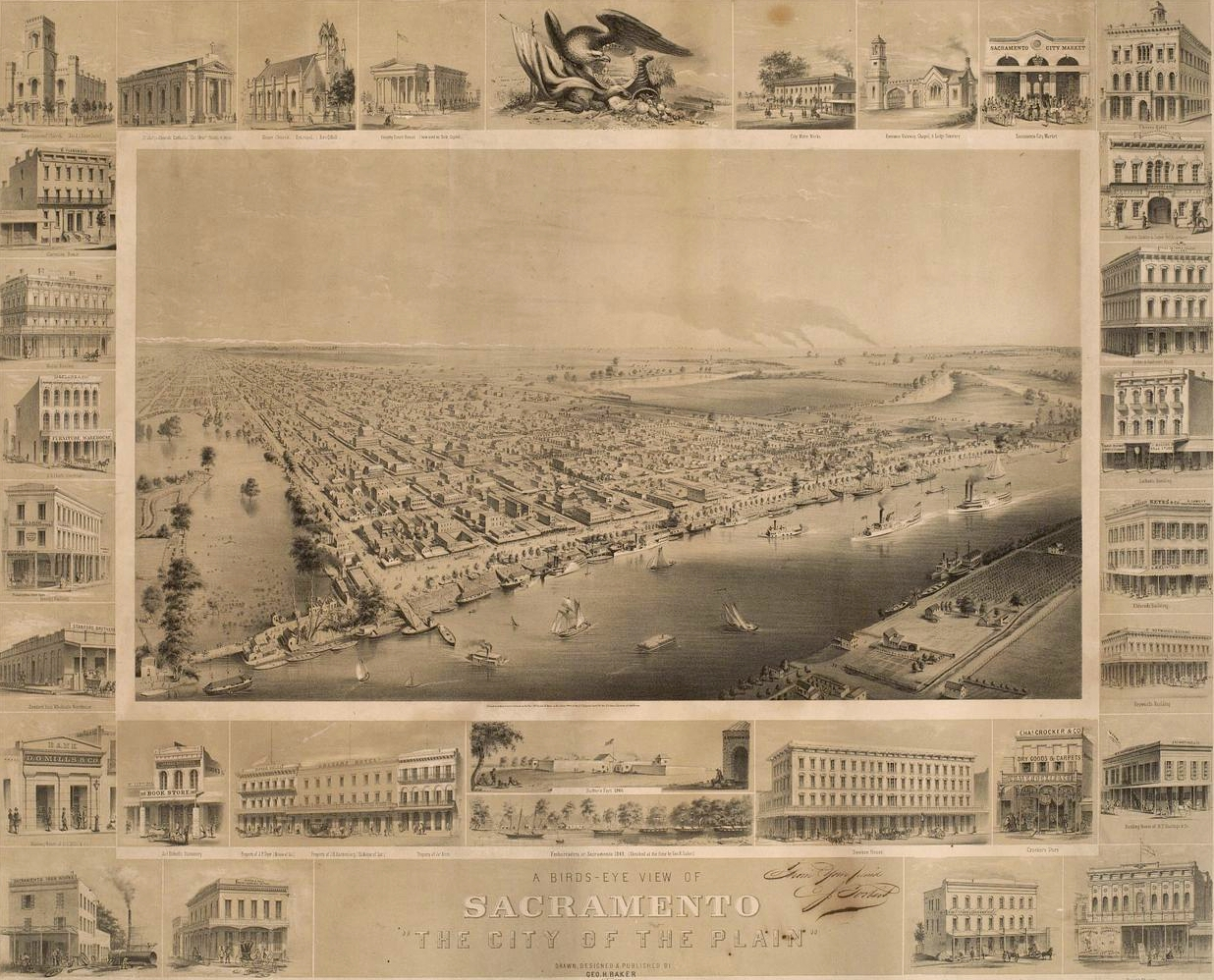
Birds-eye view of Sacramento, ca. 1857

After his activity in the Patriot War, Duncombe moved from Cleveland to Rochester, in 1841. He practised medicine there until he moved to Sacramento County, California in 1849 at the beginning of the California Gold Rush. Although one of the first doctors to arrive in Sacramento, he did not qualify to practise in the state until 1851. He married Lucy Millard of California in 1857. He was elected to the Sacramento city council.

In 1859, he was elected to the California State Assembly as one of four members from Sacramento County, but was disqualified because it was argued that he gave up his American citizenship when he allowed himself to be elected to a foreign (Canadian) legislature. He became an American citizen and was elected again in 1863 as one of the county's five representatives. He died in Hicksville, California, in 1867 after a severe case of sunstroke and buried in the Masonic Section of the Sacramento Historic City Cemetery in Sacramento, California.

California Assembly
Preceded by Four members	California State Assemblyman, 9th District; 1859 (with three others)	Succeeded by Four members
Preceded by Five members	California State Assemblyman, 16th District; 1863 (with four others)	Succeeded by Five members
