= House of Assembly of Upper Canada =

Historical parliament in Canada

Type
- Type: Lower house of the Parliament of Upper Canada

History
- Founded: September 17, 1792
- Disbanded: February 10, 1840
- Succeeded by: Legislative Assembly of the Province of Canada

The House of Assembly of Upper Canada was the elected lower house of the Parliament of Upper Canada, the legislature of the province of Upper Canada in British North America between 1792 and 1841.

Upper Canada and its government institutions were created when the old Province of Quebec was divided into Upper and Lower Canadas by the Constitutional Act of 1791. (Note: Constitution Act 1791 was the colloquial short title commonly used in Canada, but a legally sanctioned one until 1985. The legally sanctioned short title for the act was The Clergy Endowments (Canada) Act, 1791.) The act laid out the basic structure of the colonial government, including the Parliament of Upper Canada and its two chambers. Despite being the chamber made up of elected representatives, the assembly had limited authorities. Its legislative power was subject to veto by the appointed Lieutenant Governor, Executive Council, and Legislative Council. As observed by Earl of Durham in his consequential report, "(t)his veto they used without much scruple."

The initial sixteen members were elected in Upper Canada's first general election held in August 1792. Voting franchise was only extended to land-owning males, and remained so throughout the province's existence. The first session of the assembly convened on 17 September 1792 in newly renamed Newark, Upper Canada (previously known as Butlersburg, located at modern day Niagara-on-the-Lake), the inaugural provincial capital. The assembly was dissolved in 1796 and reconvened for twelve more sessions between 1797 and 1840 in modest buildings in York, the new capital of Upper Canada. Following the Battle of York in 1813, American troops carried out various acts of arson and plundering including setting fire to the buildings of the Legislative Assembly.

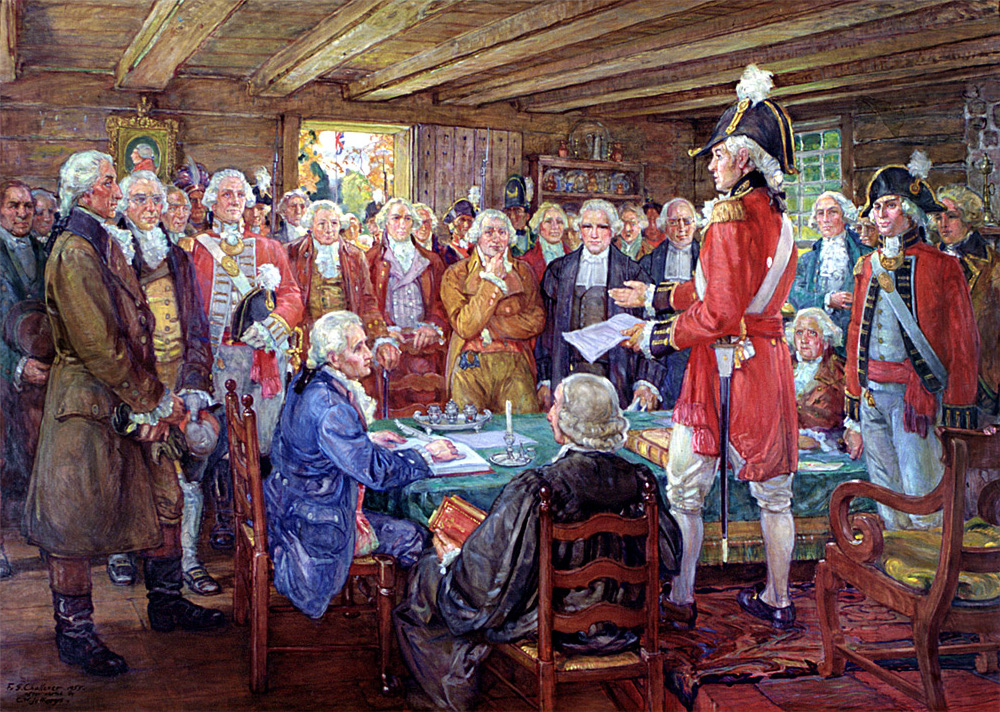
The first legislature of Upper Canada, by Frederick Challener

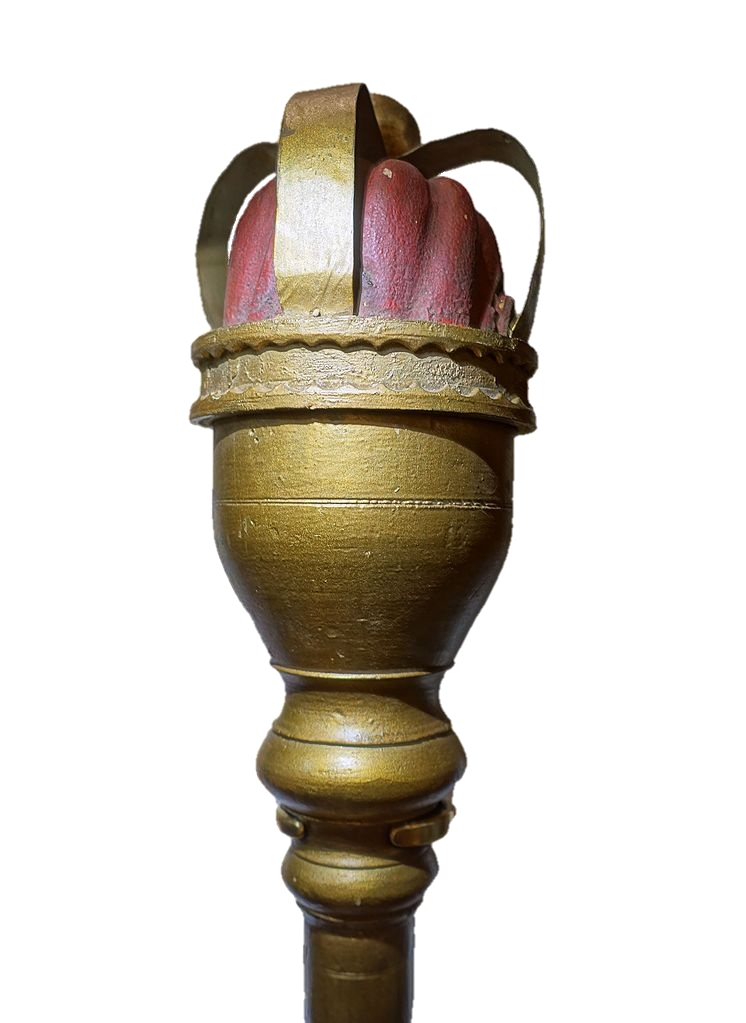
The First ceremonial mace of Upper Canada

== Context of political divisions ==
Following the war, the executive and legislative councils became increasingly dominated by the Family Compact, an oligarchic clique of wealthy individuals emerged in the 1810s revolving primarily around John Strachan, the Anglican archdeacon and a member of the powerful Executive Council of Upper Canada. The compact was deeply opposed to American republicanism and favoured full establishment for the Anglican church in Upper Canada. Their increasingly authoritarian style of governance and disregard for the will of the Legislative Assembly led to demands for government that was more responsible to the electorate and eventually the Upper Canada Rebellion of 1837. Opposing the Family Compact were initially an assortment of anti-establishment members occasionally backed by leaders of other Protestant denominations, but it did not gain strength until a more formal group of reformers emerged, initially led by William Warren Baldwin starting 1820s and then by William Lyon Mackenzie in the 1830s.

The 1840 Act of Union united Upper and Lower Canada into the single Province of Canada and, from this point until Confederation in 1867, a joint parliament was held for the united province.

== List of parliaments ==
Over the fifty-year lifespan of Upper Canada, its parliament convened over thirteen parliamentary terms.

| Parl | Election | Convened | Dissolved | Sess. | Mems. | Speaker | Lt. Governor |
|---|---|---|---|---|---|---|---|
| 1st | August 1792 | Sept. 17, 1792 | July 1, 1796 | 5 | 16 | Captain John McDonell | John Graves; Simcoe |
| 2nd | August 1796 | June 1, 1797 | July 7, 1800 | 4 | 16 | David William Smith (1797–1800); Samuel Street (from June 5, 1800 | John Graves; Simcoe |
| 2nd | August 1796 | June 1, 1797 | July 7, 1800 | 4 | 16 | David William Smith (1797–1800); Samuel Street (from June 5, 1800 | Peter; Hunter |
| 3rd | July 1800 | May 28, 1801 | May 14, 1804 | 4 | 19 | David William Smith (1st & 2nd sess.); Richard Beasley (3rd & 4th sess.) | Peter; Hunter |
| 4th | May 1804 | Feb. 2, 1805 | May 21, 1808 | 4 | 19 | Alexander Macdonell | Peter; Hunter |
| 4th | May 1804 | Feb. 2, 1805 | May 21, 1808 | 4 | 19 | Alexander Macdonell | Francis; Gore |
| 5th | May 1808 | Feb. 2, 1809 | May 1, 1812 | 4 | 25 | Samuel Street | Francis; Gore |
| 6th | June 1812 | July 27, 1812 | April 18, 1816 | 5 | 25 | Allan McLean | Francis; Gore |
| 7th | July 1816 | Feb. 4, 1817 | May 20, 1820 | 5 | 25 | Allan McLean | Francis; Gore |
| 7th | July 1816 | Feb. 4, 1817 | May 20, 1820 | 5 | 25 | Allan McLean | Sir Peregrine; Maitland |
| 8th | July 1820 | Jan. 31, 1821 | June 22, 1824 | 4 | 40 | Levius Peters Sherwood | Sir Peregrine; Maitland |
| 9th | July 1824 | Jan. 13, 1825 | June 24, 1828 | 4 | 44 | John Wilson | Sir Peregrine; Maitland |
| 10th | July 1828 | Jan. 8, 1829 | (Note: dissolution upon demise of the Crown, King George IV)Sept. 8, 1830 | 2 | 48 | Marshall Spring Bidwell | Sir John; Colborne (Note: enobled as Baron Seaton upon return to England) |
| 11th | October 1830 | Jan. 7, 1831 | Sept. 1, 1834 | 4 | 52 | Archibald McLean | Sir John; Colborne |
| 12th | October 1834 | Jan. 15, 1835 | (Note: Dissolution orderd by Lieutenant Governor, Sir Francis Bond Head following the assembly's refusal of supply)May 28, 1836 | 2 | 61 | Marshall Spring Bidwell | Sir John; Colborne |
| 12th | October 1834 | Jan. 15, 1835 | May 28, 1836 | 2 | 61 | Marshall Spring Bidwell | Sir Francis B. Head |
| 13th | June 1836 | Nov. 8, 1836 | (Note: Legislation was enacted in March 1837 to prevent dissolution of parliament upon the demise of William IV in June 1837)Feb 10, 1840 | 5 | 62 | Archibald McLean (1st sess.); Allan MacNab (from 2nd sess.) (Note: Henry Ruttan acting 1837-12-28 to 1838-01-24 during MacNab's absence)) | Sir Francis B. Head |
| 13th | June 1836 | Nov. 8, 1836 | Feb 10, 1840 | 5 | 62 | Archibald McLean (1st sess.); Allan MacNab (from 2nd sess.) | Sir George Arthur (Note: created a baronet upon return to England) |
| 13th | June 1836 | Nov. 8, 1836 | Feb 10, 1840 | 5 | 62 | Archibald McLean (1st sess.); Allan MacNab (from 2nd sess.) | Charles P. Thomson (Note: enobled as Baron Sydenham soon after the union of Upper and Lower Canadas) |

The 7th and the 10th parliaments were dissolved upon the demise of the Crown, respectively the death of King George III in 1820 and of his son King George IV in 1830. Both occurred decades before the operation of transatlantic telegraph, therefore the demise were not formally proclaimed in the province until weeks after the actual death of the monarchs. By the time the news of the passing of George III arrived, the 7th Parliament had already prorogued its fifth session, so the proclamation caused no real change to the parliamentary cycle. It did however prompted a formal communications from the Government House in Quebec to the Montreal Herald confirming the validity of all legislative actions taken before the formal notice of the demise. The demise of George IV in the summer of 1830 triggered the general election in October that year.

The 12th Parliament was dissolved early by Sir Francis Bond Head when upon its refusal to provide supply in protest of Head's disregard of the advice of the Reform Party executive councillors. With Head's overt support, conservatives secured a working majority in the 13th Parliament, and proceed to pre-empt the operation of the demise of the Crown with legislation preventing dissolution, enacted by Head in March 1937, just in time to forestall dissolution upon the death of William IV three months later. The tactical victory was short-lived and contributed further to discontent among reformers. Events eventually led to the armed rebellion starting in December 1837. Head was recalled by the Whig government in London soon after.

== Composition ==
While the Constitution Act of 1791 provided the organizational structure of Upper Canada's legislature, it did not prescribed either administrative or electoral divisions for the new province, but left them in the hands of the Lieutenant Governor. The original county designations for Upper Canada and the definition of the sixteen electoral divisions for the 1st Parliament of Upper Canada were both prescribed in a royal proclamation issued by Lieutenant Governor John Graves Simcoe on July 16, 1792.

The proclamation also introduced the term "riding", the Canadian colloquial term for electoral district. The "ridings" were however not initially intended for electoral purposes, but instead as judicial districts within three crucial counties — Glengarry (the easternmost county, bordering Quebec), Lincoln (where the provincial capital was located) and York (where the capital would move to in a few years) — "for the speedy execution of justice". Of the eight ridings prescribed in the proclamation, only four were electoral districts in the 1st Parliament. It was not until the 12th Parliament of Upper Canada, convened in 1834, that every defined riding had its own representative. Even then, riding seats only accounted for eight of the House of Assembly's sixty-one seats, with counties accounting for forty-seven of the remaining fifty-five seats. As the population of the counties grew, more and more counties were further divided for administrative reasons. The creation of more ridings naturally led to the increasing use of the term in an electoral context.

=== Evolution of composition ===
The House of Assembly was expanded to nineteen seats in the 3rd and 4th Parliament, and to twenty-five in the 5th to 7th parliament. There was no discernable approach being consistent applied in the apportionment of seats in these early parliaments. The seats allocation of seats in the Home District were particularly erratic. For example, the of the 3rd and 4th parliaments consists of an eclectic mix of seat arrangements.

Single county seats (6)

- Dundas
- Grenville
- Leeds
- Frontenac
- Prince Edward
- Kent

Duo-member seats (8)

- Glengarry & Prescott
- West York, 1st Lincoln & Haldimand
- 2nd, 3rd, 4th Lincoln
- Essex

Seats shared by multiple counties (5)

- Stormont & Russell
- Lennox & Addington
- Hastings & Northumberland
- Durham, Simcoe & 1st York
- Norfolk, Oxford & Middlesex

That changed in the lead up to the election in July 1820. A legislation was passed to provide for representation for every county with population of over a thousand, and two members for those with over four thousand. It also created representation for two towns, York and Kingston. The assembly therefore expanded after every election from the 8th to the 13th Parliament. The change of composition of the assembly shed some interesting insights of the population development of the province in its five decades of existence.

| Parl. | Seats | District (1792) | | | | | | | | Seat Type | | | | |
| Parl. | Seats | Western | | Home | | Midland | | Eastern | | Single | Duo | Riding | Town | Shared |
| 1st, 2nd | 16 | 3.5 | 22% | 3.5 | 22% | 3.5 | 22% | 5.5 | 34% | 4 | 2 | 4 | - | 6 (Note: three shared by two counties; one shared by three counties; one shared by two counties and a riding; one shared by a county and a riding) |
| 3rd, 4th | 19 | 4 | 21% | 5 | 26% | 4 | 21% | 6 | 32% | 6 | 4 | - | - | 9 (Note: three seats - (each) shared by two counties; two seats - (each) shared by three counties or ridings; four seats - two pairs of duo seat - each pair shared by three counties or ridings) |
| 5th–7th | 25 | 5 | 20% | 7 | 28% | 6 | 24% | 7 | 28% | 9 | 2 | 6 | - | 8 (Note: four seats - (each) shared by two counties; four seats - two pairs of duo seat - each pair shared by two counties or ridings) |
| 8th | 40 | 8 | 20% | 10 | 25% | 11 | 28% | 11 | 28% | 7 | 22 | 4 | 2 | 5 (Note: one seat shared by two counties; four seats - two pairs of duo seat - each pair shared by two counties) |
| 9th | 44 | 9 | 20% | 12 | 27% | 11 | 25% | 12 | 27% | 6 | 30 | 2 | 3 | 3 (Note: one seat shared by two counties; two seats shared by two ridings) |
| 10th | 48 | 9 | 19% | 13 | 27% | 13 | 27% | 13 | 27% | 4 | 36 | 2 | 3 | 3 (Note: one seat shared by two counties; two seats shared by two ridings) |
| 11th | 52 | 9 | 17% | 14 | 27% | 13 | 25% | 16 | 31% | 3 | 40 | 2 | 4 | 3 (Note: one seat shared by two counties; two seats shared by two ridings) |
| 12th | 61 | 11 | 18% | 18 | 30% | 13 | 21% | 19 | 31% | 3 | 44 | 8 | 6 | - |
| 13th | 62 | 12 | 19% | 18 | 29% | 13 | 21% | 19 | 31% | 3 | 44 | 8 | 7 | - |

== Incomplete Records ==
During the War of 1812, American troops captured the provincial capital following the Battle of York and carried out various acts of arson and plundering of both state and civilian property from April 28 to April 30, 1813. The Palace of Parliament, then home to the legislature, and the Government House, home to the Lieutenant Governor of Upper Canada, were two of the prominent targets that were set on fire.

Some of the official records of the Parliament of Upper Canada were either destroyed or removed in the process. While some of the records have been returned by order of American military command, recovered through various means, or recreated from copies of fragments sent to other offices and depositories, certain portions remain missing. No copy of the journals of the House of Assembly for the years 1794, 1795, 1796, 1797, 1809, the 2nd Session of 1812, 1813, and 1815 are known to have survived.

== Location and host structure ==
The Parliament of Upper Canada convened in the capital of the province, which was located in Newark (today's Niagara-on-the-lake) during the 1st Parliament, and was relocated to the Town of York, later renamed Toronto in 1834, for the remainder twelve parliaments.
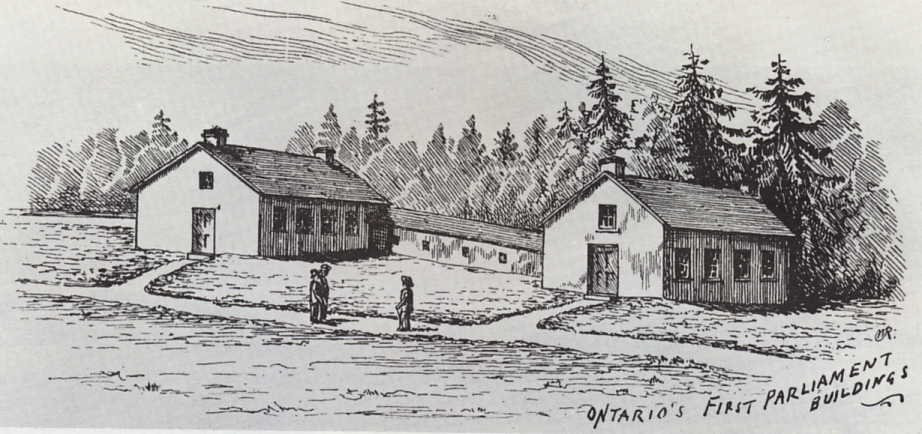
The first Parliament of Ontario (Upper Canada) in Toronto (York) on Front Street at Parliament Street, pre-1812

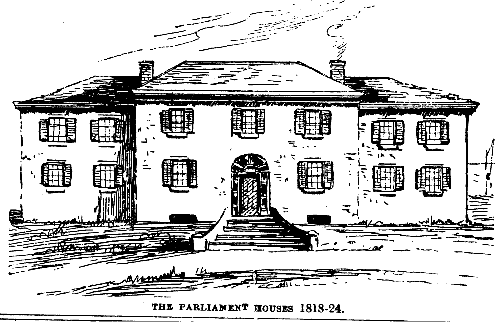
The second Parliament of Ontario (Upper Canada) in Toronto (York), 1818–1824

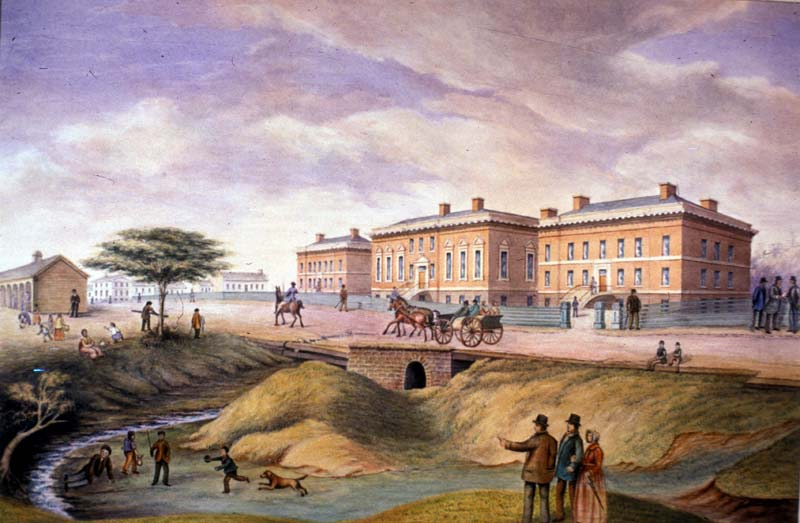
The third Parliament Building in York, 1832, on Front Street between Simcoe and John St.

Various locations were identified as being the site for the Parliament of Upper Canada while the provincial capital was located in Newark (today's Niagara-on-the-lake). Once the capital was moved to the town of York (today's Toronto), location of the assembly were more definitively documented.

| Years | Location | Building & notes |
|---|---|---|
| 1792-1796 | Newark (Note: Present day Niagara-on-the-Lake) | Various mentioned, including: the Anchorage; Freemanson's Hall; Navy Hall (Official residence of LG Simcoe) |
| 1796-1813 | Town of York (until 1834) Toronto | Palace of Parliament, Front and Parliament Sts. (destroyed on 27 April 1813 by arson by American soldiers) |
| 1814 (once) | Town of York (until 1834) Toronto | Jordan's York Holel, between King and Front Sts. (Note: Present day location of Toronto Sun Building) |
| 1815-1820 | Town of York (until 1834) Toronto | The Lawn, Wellington and York Sts. (Personal residence of Chief Justice William Henry Draper) |
| 1820-1824 | Town of York (until 1834) Toronto | Upper Canada's Second Parliament Building, Front & Parliament Sts. (Note: Structure located on same plot as Palace of Parliament but further northwest (King and Berkeley)) (Destroyed by accidental fire on 30 December 1824) |
| 1825-1828 | Town of York (until 1834) Toronto | The later York General Hospital, King and Hospital (Note: Present day Richmond Street) Sts. (Consequently delay the opening of the hospital) |
| 1829-1832 | Town of York (until 1834) Toronto | The former Court House, bordered by King/Church/Court/Toronto Sts. (South of present day location of the Courthouse Square Park) |
| 1832-1840 | Town of York (until 1834) Toronto | The later First Ontario Parliament Buildings, bordered by Front/John/Simcoe/Wellington Sts. (Note: Present day location of Metro Hall/CBC Broadcasting Centre) (third parliament building for Upper Canada) |

The successor legislature, the Parliament of the Province of Canada, initially convened in Kingston, the capital of the newly united province, at the Alwington House, and would move numerous times in its short lifespan. The capital of the Province of Canada would returned to its former home in Toronto twice, between 1849 and 1851, and again between 1855 and 1859, with Upper Canada's third parliament building, known as the First Ontario Parliament Buildings, hosting its legislature during those periods. Upon Canadian Confederation, the building would house the legislature of the Province of Ontario, the Legislative Assembly of Ontario, until 1892.

== Changing loyalties ==
A number of members have fled to, or opted to move to, the United States, following the War of 1812 or fled to other countries following the Rebellion of 1837. This list only included those who left Canada under adverse circumstances, where their departures would reasonably be seen as for political dissention or as explicit repudiation of their allegiances to the British Crown.

| Name | Parl | Electoral Division | Born/Died | Reason for leaving Canada |
|---|---|---|---|---|
| Joseph Willcocks | 4th to 6th | York West, Lincoln 1st & Haldimand (4th); Lincoln 1st & Haldimand (5th, 6th) | b. Palmerstown, Ireland d. Fort Erie, Ontario | Switch allegiance to the United States in 1813, organized Canadian Volunteers within United States Army, rank as Lieutenant Colonel; died in Canada and re-buried in Buffalo, New York |
| Robert Thorpe | 4th | Durham, Simcoe & 1st York | b. Dublin, Ireland d. London, UK | (No change of alligence) Left Canada following suspension from office by the Lieutenant Governor, subdsequently served as chief justice and judge of the Vice-Admiralty Court in Sierra Leone 1808–1811; died in England |
| Benajah Mallory | 4th, 5th | Norfolk, Oxford & Middlesex (4th); Oxford & Middlesex (5th) | b. Vermont (Thirteen Colonies) d. Lockport, New York | Fled Canada during War of 1812 and subsequently served in Canadian Volunteers with United States Army, died in NY |
| Abraham Markle | 6th | York West | b. Ulster County, province of New York d. Terre Haute, Indiana | Left Canada during War of 1812 and joined Canadian Volunteers with United States Army as a Major; died in the US |
| Marshall Spring Bidwell | 9th to 12th | Lennox and Addington (Speaker in 10th, 12th) | b. Stockbridge, Massachusetts d. New York, NY | Forced to leave Canada due in involvement in 1837 Rebellion, became New York State lawyer, died in NYC |
| Hiram Norton | 11th to 13th | Grenville | b. Vermont d. Lockport, Illinois | Fled Canada due to involvement in 1837 Rebellion; became a flour mill owner/operator; died in US |
| Charles Duncombe | 11th to 13th | Oxford | b. Connecticut d. Hicksville, California | Fled Canada due to involvement in 1837 Rebellion, became California State Assemblyman 1859 and later as a county representative of the Sacramento County 1863–1867; died in California |
| William Lyon Mackenzie | 10th to 12th (Note: upon reutn to Canada, elected to the 3rd to 6th Parliament of the Province of Canada) | York (10th); York County (11th); York 2nd (12th) | b. Dundee, Scotland d. Toronto, Province of Canada | Fled Canada due to involvement in 1837 Rebellion, became US citizen and later returned to Canada 1849; died in Toronto |
| Robert Alway | 12th, 13th | Oxford | b. Gloucester, Gloucestershire (UK) d. Republic of Texas | Fled Canada due to involvement in 1837 Rebellion and died shortly after arriving in Texas |

== See also ==
- Responsible Government
- Upper Canada Rebellion
- Legislative Council of Upper Canada
- Executive Council of Upper Canada
- Lieutenant Governors of Upper Canada, 1791–1841
- Legislative Assembly of the Province of Canada

== Notes & References ==
=== Sources ===
Legislations

- Constitution Act, 1791. Statutes of the United Kingdom. Vol. 31 George III. 1791. c. 31.
- An Act for the better Division of this Province. Laws of His Majesty's province of Upper Canada. Vol. 38 George III. 1798. c.5.
- An Act for the more equal Representation of the Commons of this Province in Parliament, and for the better defining the Qualification of Electors. Laws of His Majesty's province of Upper Canada. Vol. 40 George III. 1800. c.3.
- An Act for the better Representation of the Commons of this Province in Parliament, and to repeal part of an Act passed in the fortieth year of his Majesty’s reign, entitled “an Act for the more equal representation of the Commons of this Province, and for the better defining the qualification of the Electors.”. Statutes of His Majesty's province of Upper Canada. Vol. 48 George III. 1808. c.11.
- An Act to provide for Increasing the Representation of the Commons of this Province in the House of Assembly. Statutes of His Majesty's province of Upper Canada. Vol. 60 George III. 1820. c.2.
- An Act to prevent the Dissolution of the Parliament of this Province, in the event of a Demise of the Crown. Statutes of the Province of Upper Canada. Vol. 7 William IV. 1837. c.17.

Parliamentary Records

- "Journal and Proceedings of the House of Assembly of the Province of Upper Canada, 1792". Journals of the Legislative Assembly of Upper Canada, 1792–1804. 1 (1792). Ontario Archives. 1909.
- "Journal and Proceedings of the House of Assembly of Upper Canada, 1818, 1819, 1820, 1821". Journals of the Legislative Assembly of Upper Canada, 1818 - 1821 (Tenth report of the Bureau of Archives for the Province of Ontario). Ontario Archives. 1914.
- "Journal and Proceedings of the House of Assembly of Upper Canada 1836-37". Journals of the Legislative Assembly of Upper Canada. Robert Stanton, King's Printer. 1837.

Books and other sources

- Armstrong, Frederick H. (1985). Handbook of Upper Canadian Chronology. Toronto: Dundurn Press. ISBN 0-919670-92-X.
- Campbell, Wilfred (September 1910). "A List of the Members of the House of Assembly for Upper Canada from 1792, to the Union in 1841". Proceedings and transactions of the Royal Society of Canada. 3rd. 4 (Meeting of Sept 1910, Transactions of Section II. (Read in part 27th May, 1909.)). Royal Society of Canada: 169–190.
- Froman, Debra, ed. (1984). "Parliament Buildings". Legislators and Legislatures of Ontario: A Reference Guide. Vol. 1. Legislative Assembly of Ontario. p. v.
- "History of Ontario's Legislative Buildings". Government of Ontario. Archived from the original on 17 February 2010.
- James G. Chewett, "The Upper Canada almanac, and provincial calendar, for the year of Our Lord 1827: being the third after bissextile or leap year, and the eighth year of the reign of His Majesty [King G]eorge the Fourth ..." (York (Toronto): Robert Stanton, 1827), 76, ii pp.
- James G. Chewett, "The Upper Canada almanac and astronomical calendar for the year of Our Lord 1828: being bissextile or leap year and the ninth year of the reign of His Majesty King George the Fourth ..." (York (Toronto): Robert Stanton, 1828), 76, ii pp.
- James G. Chewett, "The Upper Canada almanac, and provincial calendar, for the year of Our Lord 1831: being the third after bissextile, or leap year, and the second year of the reign of His Majesty King William the Fourth ..." (York (Toronto): Robert Stanton, 1831), 103, ii pp.
