= Robert Alway =

Upper Canada politician

Robert Alway (1790 – August 6, 1840) was a farmer and political figure in Upper Canada.

He was born in Gloucester, Gloucestershire, England in 1790 and arrived in Upper Canada around 1816. He represented Oxford in the Legislative Assembly of Upper Canada from 1834 to 1841 as a Reformer. He served in the local militia but was dismissed in 1838. He was arrested after the Upper Canada Rebellion but later released because there was insufficient evidence of any wrongdoing. He left the country and moved to Texas where he died of yellow fever in 1840.
