= Levius Peters Sherwood =

Canadian politician

Levius Peters Sherwood (December 12, 1777 – May 19, 1850) was a lawyer, judge and political figure in Upper Canada.

== Early life ==
He was born at St. Johns in Lower Canada. He studied law and was called to the bar in 1803. In 1804, he was appointed registrar for Grenville, Leeds, and Carleton and customs inspector. In the same year, he married Charlotte Jones, daughter of Ephraim Jones.

== Career ==
In 1812, he was elected to the Legislative Assembly of Upper Canada representing Leeds. In 1818, he successfully defended two Métis against charges of murdering Robert Semple in the Red River Colony. In 1820, he was appointed judge in the Johnstown District court. He was reelected to the Legislative Assembly in 1820 and he was chosen as speaker the following year. In 1825, he was appointed to the Court of King's Bench. He played an important role in the trials for treason that followed the Upper Canada Rebellion.

== Later life and death ==
He retired from the bench in 1840. Sherwood was named to the council of King's College in 1841. He was appointed to the Legislative Council of the Province of Canada in 1842 and the Executive Council in 1843.

He died at Toronto in 1850. His son Henry became a member of the Legislative Assembly, a judge and mayor of Toronto.

His brother, Samuel, served in the legislative assemblies of Upper and Lower Canada.

Preceded by Allan McLean	Speaker of the Legislative Assembly of Upper Canada; 1821–1824	Succeeded by John Wilson
