= Allan McLean (Upper Canada politician) =

Canadian politician

Allan McLean (1752 – 8 October 1847) was a Scottish-born lawyer and politician in Upper Canada. He was the first lawyer in 1794 authorized to practise in Kingston. He was first elected in May 1804 as a member of the Legislative Assembly of Upper Canada. From 1805 to 1824, McLean represented the riding of Frontenac in the 4th to 8th Parliaments of Upper Canada.

McLean married Harriet McLean, the daughter of Neil McLean. He was a lieutenant in the British Army in the Thirteen Colonies, serving during the American Revolution. McLean settled in Kingston. He was lieutenant-colonel in the militia and served during the War of 1812. McLean was registrar for Frontenac, Lennox and Addington, Prince Edward and Hastings counties. He also served as clerk of the peace for the Midland District. McLean died in 1847 in Kingston.

Preceded by Samuel Street	Speaker of the Legislative Assembly of Upper Canada; 1813–1820	Succeeded by Levius Peters Sherwood
