= Toronto Sun Building =

Building in Ontario, Canada

Coordinates: 43.651403°N 79.365717°W

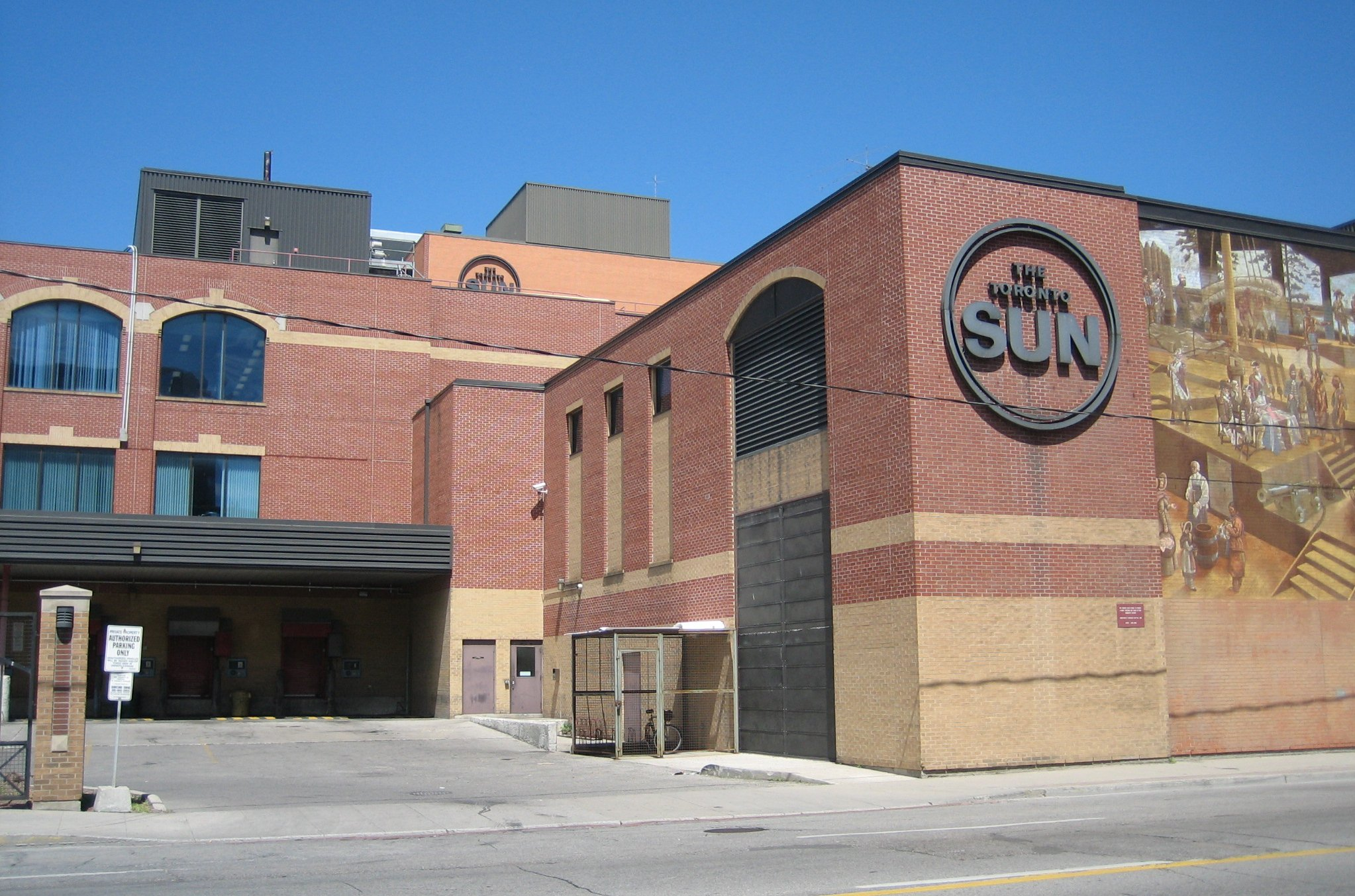
Southern facade of the Toronto Sun Building, in 2007.

The former Toronto Sun Building, at 333 King Street East at Sherbourne (now 333-351 King Street East) was built as the home of one of Toronto's daily English language newspapers, the Toronto Sun. Built in 1975, with a sixth floor added subsequently, the most notable feature of the structure was the large mural on the south side. The mural was 55 metres wide and 7.6 metres high, covering a long brick wall along Front Street. It was done in 1993 for the Sun by artist John Hood to celebrate the bicentennial of the founding of York. It depicts two hundred years of historic events in the city.

In 2010, the building was sold to First Gulf. Although the Toronto Sun remained in the building as a tenant under a ten-year lease, the newspaper's operations were consolidated onto the second floor of the six floor building and the printing presses which were located along the south end of the complex have been removed. The rest of the building has been rented out to other commercial tenants including several retail stores, the head office of Coca-Cola Canada and a campus of George Brown Polytechnic which includes the College's School of English as a Second Language. It eventually became part of the King East Centre where a 17-storey tower at 351 King Street East was built alongside an additional 3-storey addition to 333 King Street East, which was completed in 2013.

In 2013, it was announced that the tower at 351 King Street East will house The Globe and Mail newspaper on five floors and be named "The Globe and Mail Centre". Occupancy began in December 2016 with the newspaper committed to a 15-year lease.

From 1805 to 1846 the site of 333 King was the location of the York Hotel. The hotel and tavern was built for John Jordan and later operated by Jane Jordan until 1846. The hotel was a 1 1/2-storey building with a laneway to stables for horses and stagecoaches at the back. The Legislature of Upper Canada sat there for one sitting in 1813 in the hotel's ballroom.

Following the acquisition of the Sun newspaper chain by PostMedia in 2015, it was announced that the Toronto Sun staff and operations will move to 365 Bloor Street East, the same building that houses the National Post, but that the two newspapers would maintain separate newsrooms. The move was completed on March 25, 2016, nine months prior to The Globe and Mail moving in next door to the Sun's former headquarters.
