= Marshall Spring Bidwell =

Upper Canada politician (1799–1872)

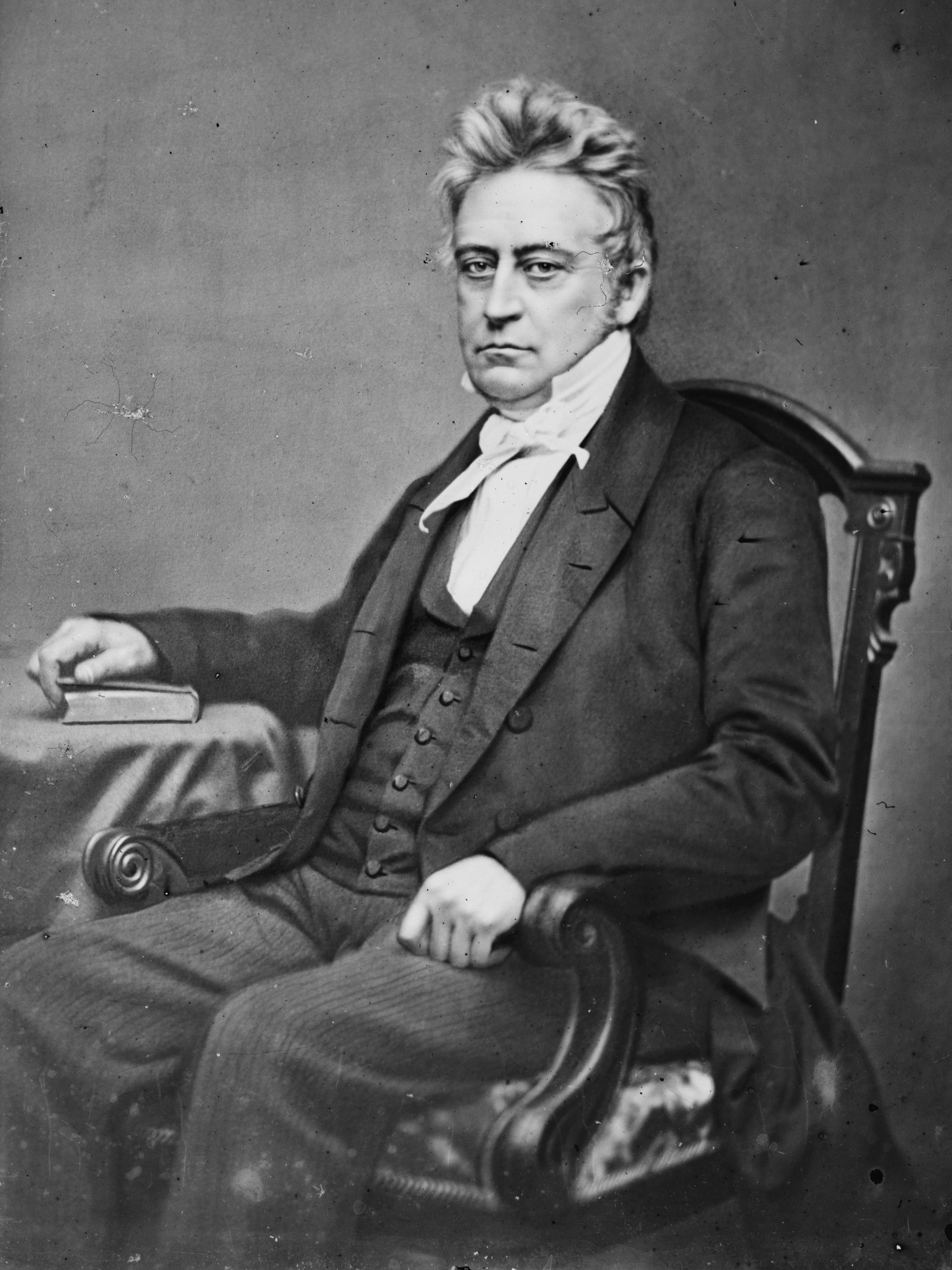

Member of the Legislative Assembly of Upper Canada for Lennox & Addington
- In office 1824–1836

Speaker of the Legislative Assembly of Upper Canada
- In office 1829–1830
- Preceded by: John Wilson
- Succeeded by: Archibald McLean
- In office 1835
- Preceded by: Archibald McLean
- Succeeded by: Archibald McLean

Personal details
- Born: February 16, 1799 Stockbridge, Massachusetts
- Died: October 24, 1872 (aged 73) New York City, New York
- Resting place: Stockbridge Cemetery, Stockbridge, Massachusetts
- Relations: Barnabas Bidwell (father)
- Occupation: Lawyer

Marshall Spring Bidwell (February 16, 1799 – October 24, 1872) was a lawyer and political figure in Upper Canada.

He was born in Stockbridge, Massachusetts in 1799, the son of politician Barnabas Bidwell. His family settled in Bath in Upper Canada before the War of 1812. He studied with a law firm in Kingston and was called to the Ontario Bar in 1821. When his father was unseated in 1821 based on allegations of misappropriation of funds in Massachusetts, Bidwell presented himself as a candidate but was declared ineligible. In the April 1823 Lennox and Addington by-election, Bidwell ran against George Ham of Bath where Ham won by 13 votes.

== Canadian political career ==
Bidwell ran in the byelection for Lennox & Addington to replace his father, who had been barred from taking his seat by the legislature. Bidwell was disqualified by the election returning officer under the assumption that if his father was ineligible to run for office Bidwell was unqualified, too. After the byelection, the legislature voided the results because of Bidwell's disqualification. In the second byelection, the returning officer again disqualified Bidwell under similar pretences but the legislature voided the second results. The 1824 general election was called before another byelection could be held and Bidwell was able to run and become elected to the 9th Parliament of Upper Canada.

He held the seat until 1836. In 1826 Bidwell represented William Lyon Mackenzie in his civil lawsuit against rioters in the Types Riot.

In 1828, he helped introduce a bill which made it easier for American-born residents to become citizens. He also lobbied for responsible government within the province. In 1828, he was elected speaker for the assembly.

Although he did not take part in the Upper Canada Rebellion, his name appeared on a banner carried by the rebels and he was forced to leave the province in December 1837. Some sources believe that Lieutenant Governor Sir Francis Bond Head forced Bidwell out of the province because Head's refusal to appoint Bidwell as a judge in the province was a factor in his dismissal by the British Colonial Office.

== Return to the United States ==
Bidwell returned to the United States, settling in New York City. He was admitted to the New York bar and in 1838 became a partner in George Washington Strong's law firm, which would later become Cadwalader, Wickersham and Taft. Bidwell died in New York City in 1872, aged 73.

== Footnotes ==
Preceded by John Wilson	Speaker of the Legislative Assembly of Upper Canada; 1829–1830	Succeeded by Archibald McLean

Preceded by Archibald McLean	Speaker of the Legislative Assembly of Upper Canada; 1835	Succeeded by Archibald McLean
