= Robert Moodie (British Army officer) =

British Army officer

Lieutenant-Colonel Robert Moodie (1778 – 4 December 1837) was a British Army officer who later settled in Canada.

== Biography ==
A native of Scotland, he was commissioned lieutenant in Elgin's Regiment of Fencible Infantry in 1795. On 12 January 1796 he was commissioned lieutenant and a lieutenant in 28th Foot on 20 January 1796. A captain in the 11th West India Regiment on 21 March 1800. A captain in 104th Foot on 9 July 1803.

As a captain, into the New Brunswick Fencibles. In 1811 he exchanged into a majority in the 104th Foot. He served in Canada during the War of 1812, participating in the Battle of Lundy's Lane, the Siege of Fort Erie and Battle of Sackett's Harbor.

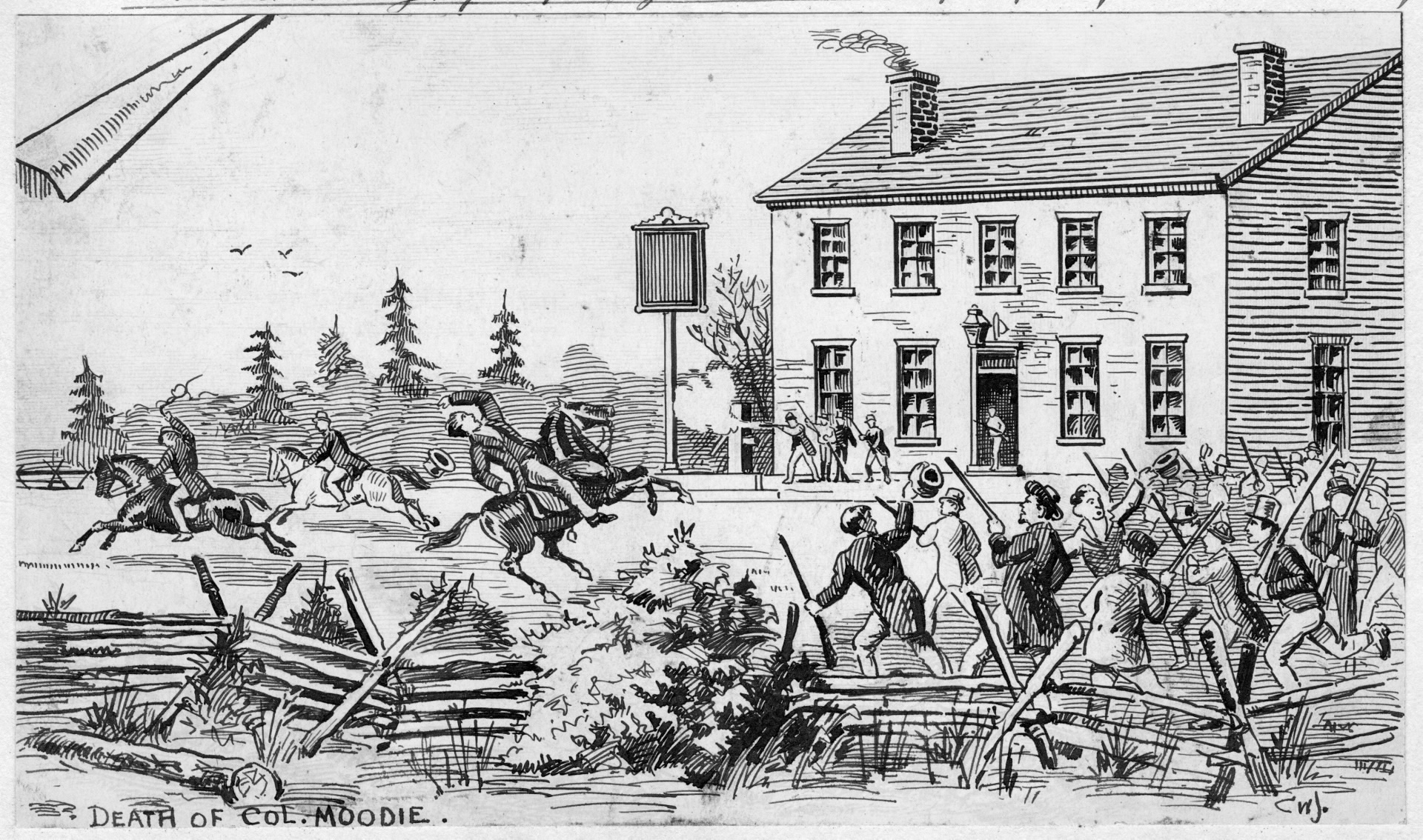
Shooting of Col. Robert Moodie, Montgomery's tavern, Toronto

Promoted to a major in the 104th Foot on 20 June 1811 and lieutenant-colonel 27 October 1814, after the previous commanding officer was killed in action. In 1820 he was on half pay of the 104th

In 1834 he sold his commission and the following year he settled at Richmond Hill. He was fatally shot by supporters of William Lyon Mackenzie in the opening incidents of the Upper Canada Rebellion on Yonge Street near Eglinton Avenue.

He is buried (Plot 249) at Holy Trinity Church, Thornhill, Ontario. Moodie was married to Frances Sproule in 1820 and had several children.
