= Allan MacNab =

Political leader in Upper Canada and the Province of Canada (1798–1862)

Sir Allan MacNab Bt
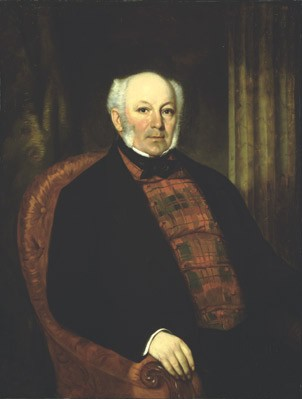
- Portrait in 1853 by Théophile Hamel

Joint Premier of the Province of Canada
- In office 11 September 1854 – 24 May 1856
- Monarch: Victoria
- Governor General: Sir Edmund Walker Head
- Preceded by: Francis Hincks
- Succeeded by: John A. Macdonald

Member of the Legislative Assembly of Upper Canada for Wentworth County
- In office 1830–1834

Member of the Legislative Assembly of Upper Canada for Hamilton
- In office 1834–1841
- Succeeded by: Position abolished

Member of the Legislative Assembly of the Province of Canada for Hamilton
- In office 1841–1857
- Preceded by: New position
- Succeeded by: Isaac Buchanan

Personal details
- Born: 19 February 1798 Newark (now Niagara-on-the-Lake), Upper Canada
- Died: 8 August 1862 (aged 64) Hamilton, Canada West
- Party: Tory
- Profession: Lawyer and businessman

Sir Allan Napier MacNab, 1st Baronet (19 February 1798 – 8 August 1862) was a Canadian political leader, land speculator and property investor, lawyer, soldier, and militia commander who served in the Legislative Assembly of Upper Canada twice (representing a different county – Wentworth and Hamilton – each time), the Legislative Assembly for the Province of Canada once, and served as joint Premier of the Province of Canada from 1854 to 1856. MacNab was "likely the largest land speculator in Upper Canada during his time" as mentioned both in his official biography in retrospect and in 1842 by Sir Charles Bagot.

MacNab was a member of the Family Compact in Upper Canada. He briefly shared a military regiment (the 49th Regiment of Foot) with another member (James FitzGibbon) in the War of 1812. MacNab was left out of the regiment following regimental cuts after the War of 1812, and found employment in the law office of another Family Compact member's grandfather – George D'Arcy Boulton (aka D'Arcy Boulton Sr.)

== Early life ==
He was born in Newark (now Niagara-on-the-Lake) to Allan MacNab and Anne Napier (daughter of Captain Peter William Napier, R.N., the commissioner of the port and harbour of Quebec). When MacNab was a one year old, he was baptized in the Anglican church in St. Mark's Parish of Newark. His father was a lieutenant in the 71st Regiment and the Queen's Rangers under Lt-Col. John Graves Simcoe. After the Queen's Rangers were disbanded, the family moved around the country in search of work and eventually settled in York (now Toronto), where MacNab was educated at the Home District Grammar School.

== War of 1812 ==
As a fourteen-year-old boy, MacNab fought in the War of 1812. He probably served at the Battle of York and certainly in the Canadian forlorn hope that headed the Anglo-Canadian assault on Fort Niagara. The twenty local men eliminated two American pickets of twenty men each with the bayonet before taking part in the final assault. Captain Kerby, of the Incorporated Militia Battalion, was reportedly the first man into the fort.

== Legal and business career ==
After his service in the War of 1812, MacNab studied law in Toronto under (at the time) Judge George D'Arcy Boulton, where MacNab "took nearly twice the average time to qualify at the bar was a result of his inadequate education and his preference for active work". In 1820, he became a captain in the York Militia. MacNab was admitted to the bar in 1824, and called to the bar in 1826. In 1826, MacNab moved from York to Hamilton, where he established a successful law office, but it was chiefly by land speculation that he made his fortune. There was no Anglican church in Hamilton yet, so MacNab attended a Presbyterian church until Christ Church was established in 1835.

A successful entrepreneur as well as politician, MacNab, with Glasgow merchant Peter Buchanan, was responsible for the construction of the Great Western Railway of Ontario. MacNab also served on several boards, including as a board member of the Beacon Fire and Life Insurance Co. of London alongside prominent financier Thomas Clarkson.

Following an amount of "liberal credit" rewarded from the Bank of Upper Canada regarding legislative assistance given by MacNab, and his own cash reserves, MacNab sought to own land. By May 1832, MacNab owned "some 2000 acres of wild land in London, Gore, and Newcastle districts". The amount increased and by 1835 MacNab had "cornered much of the best land in the centre of expanding Hamilton". MacNab's land holdings fluctuated often, and their total value at any one time is unknown, but in a suggestion of just how massive the amounts of land and sales were, Charles Bagot stated in 1842 that MacNab was "a huge proprietor of land – perhaps the largest in the country". This is stated in MacNab's biography as "probably true".

MacNab's land purchases (especially in the early 1830s) placed financial strain on MacNab initially, but proved to be worth it in the long run. In one scenario, MacNab purchased a piece of land in November 1832 located in Burlington Heights from J. S. Cartwright for 2500 pounds – 500 more than MacNab wanted – where MacNab saw the "symbol of his social aspirations" built: the opulent and luxury 72-room Dundurn Castle. On the day of the sale for the land, between 5000 and 10000 pounds of fire damage ravaged MacNab's Hamilton projects.

MacNab could prove to be unethical but effective with his business career: case in point is MacNab being some three years behind in payments for an extremely important creditor named Samuel Jarvis, and after some three years time MacNab stated he would not pay Jarvis back for this credit as Jarvis "owed MacNab for past services". Whether this is true or not is unknown, but Jarvis simply stated MacNab as one word for this – villain.

== Upper Canada Rebellion, 1837 ==
Before the Rebellion broke out, MacNab argued for increased American immigration as "they are a useful and enterprising people and if admitted would be of great advantage to the country" in 1837. Again before the Rebellion, MacNab was appointed as Lieutenant-Colonel of the 4th Regiment of the Gore militia in May 1830, partly through the influence of the Chisholm family of Oakville.

MacNab opposed the reform movement in Upper Canada that was led by William Lyon Mackenzie. When Mackenzie led the Upper Canada Rebellion in 1837, MacNab was part of the force of British regular troops and Upper Canada militia that moved against Mackenzie at Montgomery's Tavern in Toronto on 7 December, dispersing Mackenzie's rebels in less than an hour.

Following the rebels' defeat at Montgomery's Tavern, Charles Duncombe led an uprising at London. Due to his leadership at Montgomery's Tavern, Lieutenant Governor Sir Francis Bond Head gave MacNab sole command of troops sent to London. He also led a militia of his own against the rebels. Duncombe's men also dispersed themselves when they learned that MacNab's forces were waiting for them.

Despite these twin successes, some regarded the quality of MacNab's leadership as "mixed". He had had "extreme problems" in communication, procuring supplies, and controlling the volunteers, and had ignored basic operational procedures. MacNab was given 250 troops but ultimately had some 1500 men assembled total, as MacNab argued "as early as December 14".

Mackenzie fled to the United States following his defeat at the Battle of Montgomery's Tavern on 7 December, and returned to Canada on 13 December, occupying Navy island, with strong American sympathy. Sir Bond Head dispatched MacNab on Christmas Day (25 December 1837) to command the troops in Niagara with support from both naval forces and regular officers of British units. MacNab alternated between "drilling or dining" for about 4 or 5 days as "supplies and billeting were inadequate and orders were vague" regarding command centers in Toronto and Montreal. Moreover, contradictory reports came to both Head and MacNab regarding the amount of U.S. supplies and the strength and morale of Mackenzie's new rebel force. Head refused to sanction n attack on Navy island but offered no other alternatives. Some 2000 raw and reckless volunteers amassed as troops by 29 December.

29 December proved to be important to MacNab as two attacks happened against Mackenzie's forces on 29 December under MacNab's command: a dawn attack and a dusk attack. The first attack proved how little discipline the officers had under MacNab, how little control MacNab had over them, and how weak the line of command was. The second attack showed how reckless MacNab could be if his position as "commander" was questioned.

The dawn (first) attack was not sanctioned or ordered by MacNab and was the result of actions taken by a group of bibulous officers. The attack nearly ended in disaster.

The second (dusk) attack, done at MacNab's order, did end in disaster. MacNab and Captain Andrew Drew, a retired officer of the Royal Navy, commanding a party of militia, acting on information and guidance from Alexander McLeod, crossed into New York and destroyed Mackenzie's supply ship. The sinking of the SS Caroline happened in U.S. waters. A U.S. citizen was killed in the action. The official reaction was swift and immediate. The event, known as the Caroline affair, caused MacNab indicted for murder in Erie County, New York, He was replaced by Colonel Hughes, who took MacNab's post of Commander in Niagara. However, before leaving the frontier MacNab protested that Hughes would be the one to receive "all the credit" whilst MacNab and the militia had done "all the drudgery". Later, MacNab quitted the Niagara frontier on 14 January 1838. By them some 3500 troops were amassed to fight the rebels. On the evening of 14 January, Mackenzie and his force slipped off the island, and while Hughes (MacNab's replacement) was occupying Navy island, MacNab was lobbying in Toronto for his command position back.

During the Rebellions, MacNab appreciated that rebels had had varying "degrees of involvement" with rebellion. He punished "only the rebel leaders" under his own initiative, and he saw the "common followers" of the rebels as people who were "deceived", and even promised clemency to some. MacNab also shared a common philosophy in his own troops, believing that officers earn the respect of their subordinates "not only through courage in war but also by tempering strict justice with kindness and approachability off the battlefield".

In 1838, Macnab was knighted for his zeal in suppressing the rebellion.

In 1860, Macnab was appointed an honorary colonel in the British army, and aide-de-camp to Queen Victoria.

== Political career ==
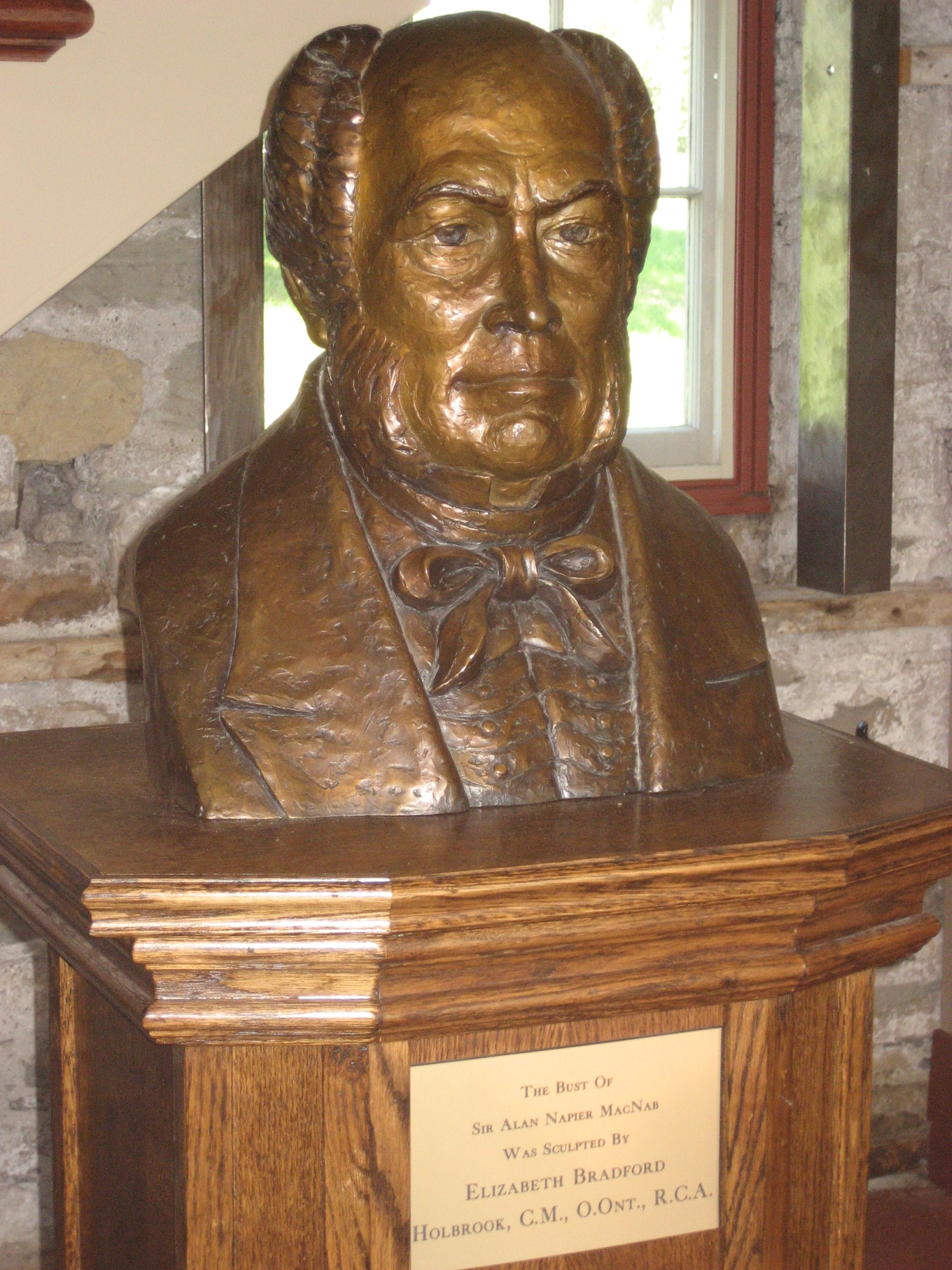
Bust of Sir Allan MacNab, sculpted by Elizabeth Bradford Holbrook.

MacNab represented Hamilton in Parliament from 1830 until his death in 1862, first in the Legislative Assembly of Upper Canada (1830–1840), then in the Legislative Assembly of the Province of Canada (1841–1860), and finally in the Legislative Council of the Province of Canada representing the Western Division (1860–1862). He was joint Premier of the province from 1854 to 1856.

In 1829, MacNab refused to testify before a House of Assembly committee which was investigating the hanging of an effigy of Lieutenant Governor Sir John Colborne, chaired by Reformer W. W. Baldwin. MacNab was subsequently sentenced to jail for 10 days by the House of Assembly, following apparent "prodding" from William Lyon Mackenzie. MacNab returned to the public as a "Tory martyr", and effectively utilized/exploited this image to defeat the Reformers in Wentworth County and secure the political victory for both himself and John Willson.

In April 1833, MacNab secured the appointment of the land registrar of Wentworth for his brother David Archibald. This was important as whoever controlled this office could "quietly acquire choice and undeveloped land in the Wentworth area without a need for a public auction". This benefitted MacNab as a land speculator as "he had gained a seemingly impregnable hold over Wentworth’s land development and, as a result, a firm grip on the county’s commercial and political future" due to appointing his brother.

MacNab came under public scrutiny when he was ousted as president of the Desjardins Canal Company in 1834, after having mortgaged a large block of personal land as security for a government loan to the company in 1832.

MacNab committed a breach of privilege and was arrested by the sergeant-at-arms during the 10th Parliament of Upper Canada after a motion by the legislative assembly. MacNab retaliated by seconding a motion in December 1831 which was accusing William Lyon Mackenzie of breach of privilege and motioned for him to be expelled from the house on the grounds of libel. The motion failed after Tory legislators feared the political backlash of supporting an obscure parliamentary privilege. This was the first of five expulsions, MacNab active in all of them.

MacNab acted as a "spearhead" in the political attacks against Mackenzie (because of his involvement in all five expulsions) and this was beneficial for MacNab, causing him to gain power within the Assembly and maintain a solid link with the members of so-called "Tory York". This was beneficial for the Tories in Canada regarding their control of power in the Upper Canadian commercial and economic sectors, as MacNab acted as bridge for all members to communicate with each other, whereas previously there was only "intra-party maneuverings". This "intra-party struggle" was most evident and apparent when it came to banks and land speculation.

MacNab was a "Compact Tory" – a supporter of the Family Compact which had controlled Upper Canada prior to the union of the Canadas. In the first Parliament of the new Province of Canada, he supported the principle of union, but was an opponent of the Governor General, Sydenham, and his policy of creating a government with a broad base of moderate supporters in the Assembly. He opposed the policy of the "Ultra Reformers" to implement responsible government.

MacNab only partly encompassed the Tory ideology in Canada and was not a religious elitist: MacNab supported all denominations (plus Catholics) in having an equal share to the proceeds from the clergy reserves, MacNab often attended a Presbyterian church whilst being Anglican, MacNab married a Catholic in his second marriage, and opposed Orangeman Ogle Robert Gowan partly because of how strong his Protestant stance was.

Although MacNab received the title of "Baronet" through a baronetcy patronage by Sir Edmund Walker Head in July 1856, the action was nearly entirely the result of Head's "sympathetic recommendation" over any sort of rewarded action.

When Parliament met at Montreal, MacNab took apartments there at Donegana's Hotel.

== Family ==
MacNab was married twice. His first wife was Elizabeth Brooke, who died 5 November 1826, possibly of complications following childbirth. Together, they had two children.

He married his second wife, Mary, who died 8 May 1846 and was a Catholic; she was the daughter of John Stuart, Sheriff of the Johnstown District, Ontario. The couple's two daughters, Sophia and Minnie, were raised as Catholics.

The couple's elder daughter, Sophia, was born at Hamilton. She married at Dundurn Castle, Hamilton, on 15 November 1855, William Keppel, Viscount Bury, afterwards the 7th Earl of Albemarle, who died in 1894. Sophia was the mother of Arnold Keppel, 8th Earl of Albemarle (born in London, England, 1 June 1858), and of eight other children. One of her sons, the Honourable Derek Keppel, served as Equerry to The Duke of York after 1893 and was in Canada with His Royal Highness, in 1901 at 53 Lowndes Square, London, S. W., England. Another of her sons, George Keppel, was married to Alice Keppel, a mistress of Edward VII, and great-grandmother of Queen Camilla, wife of Charles III.

== Death ==
MacNab died at his home, Dundurn Castle, in Hamilton. His deathbed conversion to Catholicism caused a furore in the press in the following days. The Toronto Globe and The Hamilton Spectator expressed strong doubts about the conversion, and the Anglican rector of Christ Church declared that MacNab died a Protestant.

However, MacNab's Catholic baptism is recorded at St. Mary's Cathedral in Hamilton, at the hands of John Farrell, Bishop of Hamilton, on 7 August 1862.

When the 12th Chief of Clan Macnab died, he bequeathed all his heirlooms to MacNab, whom he considered the next Chief. When the latter's son was killed in a shooting accident in Canada, the position of Chief of Clan Macnab passed to the Macnabs of Arthurstone.

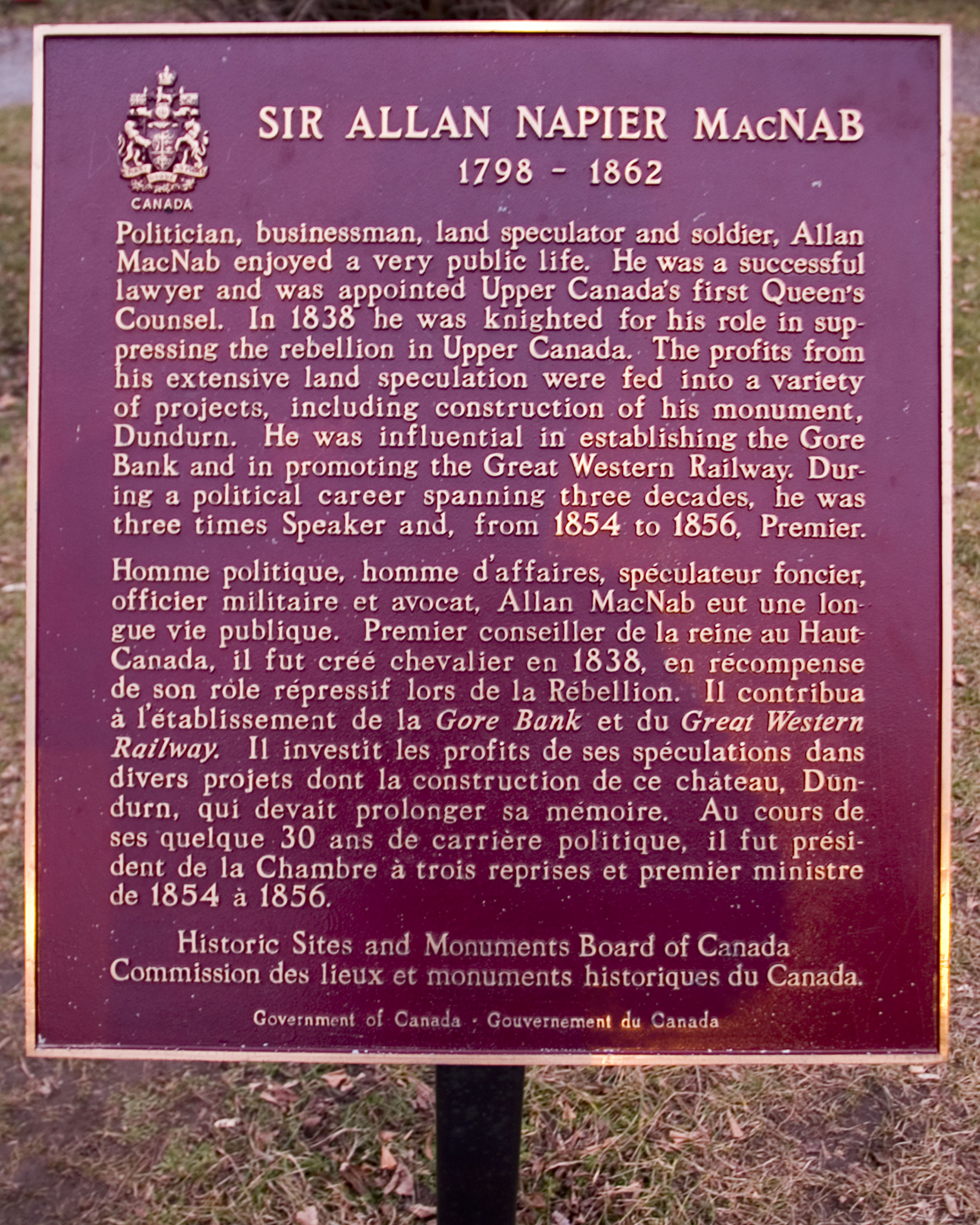
Plaque at Dundurn Castle.

== Legacy ==
MacNab Street and Sir Allan MacNab Secondary School in Hamilton, Ontario are both named after him.

Dundurn Castle, his stately Italianate style home in Hamilton, is open to the public.

A ship was named Sir Allan MacNab and was sturdily built in Canada but was not altogether designed for speed. The master in 1855 was Captain Cherry, and the tonnage of the ship was 840, then quite large.

== Sources ==
- Donald R. Beer, Sir Allan Napier MacNab (Hamilton, Ontario, 1984)

Preceded by Archibald McLean	Speaker of the Legislative Assembly of Upper Canada; 1837	Succeeded by Henry Ruttan
Preceded by Henry Ruttan	Speaker of the Legislative Assembly of Upper Canada; 1837–1840	Succeeded by Archibald McLean
Preceded by Austin Cuvillier	Speaker of the Legislative Assembly of the United Provinces of Canada; 1844–1847	Succeeded by Augustin-Norbert Morin
Baronetage of the United Kingdom
New creation	Baronet (of Dundurn Castle); 1858–1862	Extinct
