= Alwington, Kingston =

Alwington
- Neighbourhood
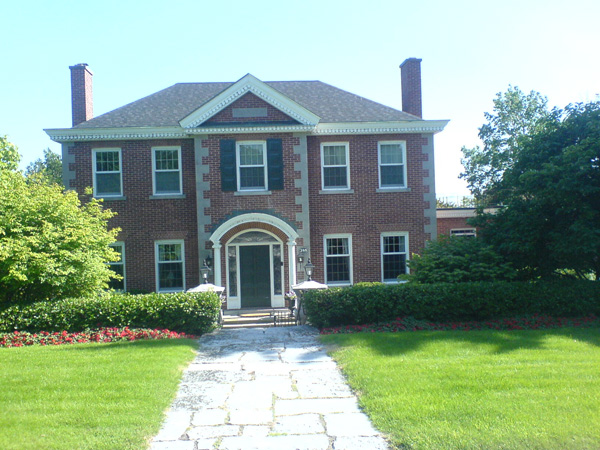
- Llynlea the private home built in 1963 by Arthur Davies brother of Canadian author Robertson Davies and son of Senator William Rupert Davies on the site of the former government house
- Interactive map of Alwington
- Country: Canada
- Province: Ontario
- County: Frontenac
- Municipality: Kingston, Ontario
- Elevation: 94 m (308 ft)

Population
  - Total: 1,160
- Time zone: UTC-5 (Eastern Time Zone)
  - Summer (DST): UTC-4 (Eastern Time Zone)
- Postal code: K7L
- Area code: 613

Alwington is a neighbourhood west of downtown Kingston, Ontario, Canada. The district is bordered by Union Street to the north, Sir John A. Macdonald Boulevard to the west, Lake Ontario to the south, and Albert Street to the east.

Alwington is Kingston's wealthiest neighbourhood, with an average household income of $161,322, which is double that of the city's average. The neighbourhood is one of the oldest in the city, and site of the former residence of the Governor General when Kingston was the capital.

Alwington House, built in 1832 by Charles le Moyne de Longueuil, Baron de Longueuil, which served as the Governor General's residence (Government House) while Kingston was the capital of Canada from 1841–44. Charles Poulett Thomson, 1st Baron Sydenham, Sir Charles Bagot and Sir Charles Metcalfe lived at Alwington House. It was badly damaged by fire in 1958 and demolished the following year. Alwington Place was developed on the former single property. A large home was built on the former back terrace of Alwington House in 1963 by Arthur Davies, brother of Canadian author Robertson Davies and son of former Senator William Rupert Davies. The front limestone retaining wall and fountain on the east side of this newer home are all that remains of Alwington House.

The neighbourhood is also home to St. Mary's of the Lake Hospital, a teaching hospital established in 1946. Along the shores of Lake Ontario, at the east of Alwington, is the J.K. Tett Centre, newly expanded and renovated in 2015. Immediately next door to the Tett Centre is the newly-opened Isabel Bader Centre for the Performing Arts. The Bader Centre's construction was financed in large measure by the generous philanthropy of Alfred Bader, a Queen's University graduate, and his wife Isabel.

Two large mid-19th century houses—St. Helen's and Stone Gables—are located on King Street, immediately west of the Tett and Bader Centres. These two mansions have recently been administrative centres for Correctional Services Canada, but have been declared surplus to government requirements in 2014, designated as heritage properties by the city of Kingston, and then placed for sale. Stone Gables was built for Thomas Kirkpatrick—elected as the first mayor of Kingston in 1838, and later MP for the area north of the city—and served as his residence.

Several student residence buildings of Queen's University—including Leonard Hall, McNeill House, Morris Hall, Donald Gordon House, and Brockington House—are located on Leonard Field, within Alwington, just west of Albert Street. The western section of the waterfront Breakwater Park also lies within Alwington.

== Notable attractions ==
- Bellevue House
- St. Mary's of the Lake Hospital
- J.K. Tett Centre
- Isabel Bader Centre for the Performing Arts

== Image gallery ==
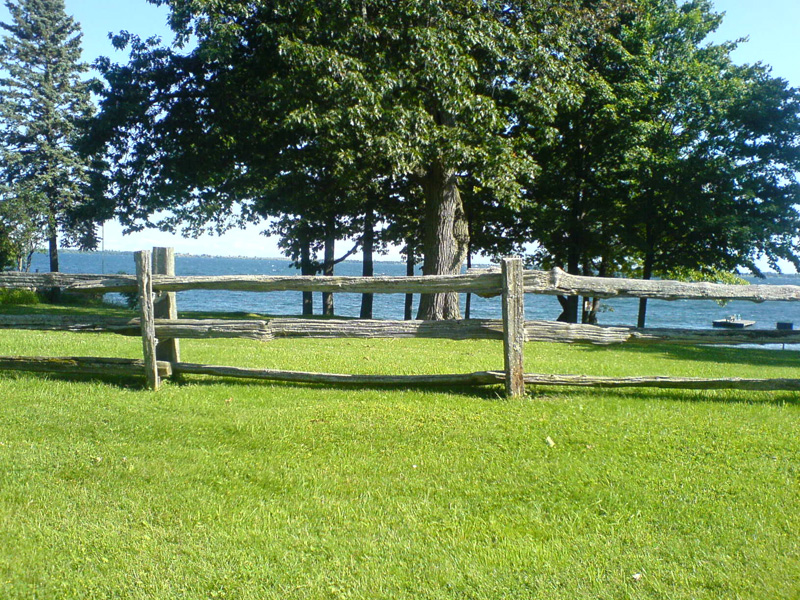
Shores of Lake Ontario along Alwington

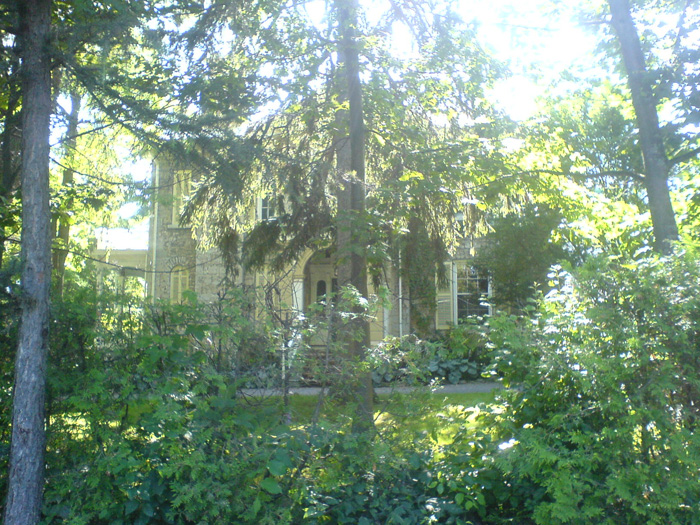
19th century home hidden behind trees
