= Upper Canada Rebellion =

1837 rebellion

- Part of the Rebellions of 1837–1838
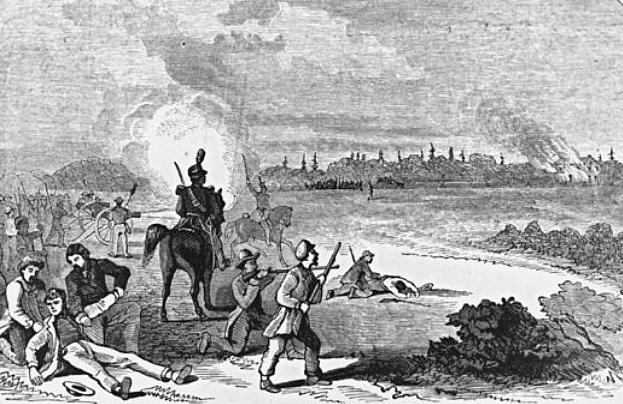
- Battle of Montgomery's Tavern
Date	7 December, 1837 – 4 December, 1838 (11 months, 4 weeks, 5 days)
Location	Toronto, Upper Canada
Result	British victory

Belligerents
Upper Canada; Family Compact	Republic of Upper Canada; Reform movement

Commanders and leaders
Francis Head; James FitzGibbon; Allan MacNab; John Button	William Mackenzie; Anthony Egmond; Samuel Lount (executed)

The Upper Canada Rebellion was an insurrection against the oligarchic government of the British colony of Upper Canada (present-day Ontario) in December 1837. While public grievances had existed for years in Upper Canada, what emboldened rebels there to revolt was the rebellion which started the previous month in Lower Canada (present-day Quebec).

The Upper Canada Rebellion was largely defeated shortly after it began, although resistance lingered until 1838. While it shrank, it became more violent, mainly through the support of the Hunters' Lodges, a secret United States–based militia that emerged around the Great Lakes, and launched the Patriot War in 1838.

Some historians suggest that although they were not directly successful or large, the rebellions in 1837 should be viewed in the wider context of the late-18th- and early-19th-century Atlantic Revolutions including the American Revolutionary War of 1775–83, the French Revolution of 1789–99, the Haitian Revolution of 1791–1804, the Irish Rebellion of 1798, and the independence struggles of Spanish America in 1810–25. While these rebellions differed in that they also struggled for republicanism, they were inspired by similar social problems stemming from poorly regulated oligarchies and sought the same democratic ideals, which were also shared by the United Kingdom's Chartists.

The rebellion in Lower Canada, followed by its Upper Canada counterpart, led directly to Lord Durham's Report on the Affairs of British North America, and to The British North America Act, 1840, which partially reformed the British provinces into a unitary system, leading to the formation of Canada as a federation in 1867.

== Background ==
=== Political structure of Upper Canada ===
Many of the grievances which underlay the rebellion involved the provisions of the Constitutional Act 1791, which had created Upper and Lower Canada's political framework. The Family Compact dominated the government of Upper Canada and the financial and religious institutions associated with it. They were the leading members of the administration: executive councillors, legislative councillors, senior officials and some members of the judiciary. Their administrative roles were intimately tied to their business activities. For example, William Allan "was an executive councillor, a legislative councillor, president of the Toronto and Lake Huron Railroad, governor of the British American Fire and Life Assurance Company, and president of the Board of Trade."

Members of the Family Compact utilized their official positions for monetary gain, especially through corporations such as the Bank of Upper Canada and the two land companies (the Clergy Corporation and the Canada Company) that between them controlled nearly 30% of the land in the colony. Lacking the minimum capital needed to found the bank, the corporate leaders persuaded the government to subscribe for a quarter of its shares. During the 1830s, a third of the bank's board were legislative or executive councillors, and the remainder were magistrates. Despite repeated attempts, the elected legislature which had chartered the bank could not obtain details on the bank's workings. Politician and former journalist William Lyon Mackenzie saw the bank as a prop of the government and demanded farmers withdraw the money they had deposited in the bank, and public confidence in the bank decreased.

=== Demographic changes ===
The government of Upper Canada feared a growing interest in American-inspired republicanism because of the increase in immigration of American settlers to the colony. The large number of migrants led American legislators to speculate that bringing Upper Canada into the American fold would be a "mere matter of marching". After the War of 1812 the colonial government prevented Americans from swearing allegiance, thereby making them ineligible to obtain land grants. Relations between the appointed Legislative Council and the elected Legislative Assembly became increasingly strained in the years after the war, over issues of immigration, taxation, banking and land speculation.

=== Political unions ===
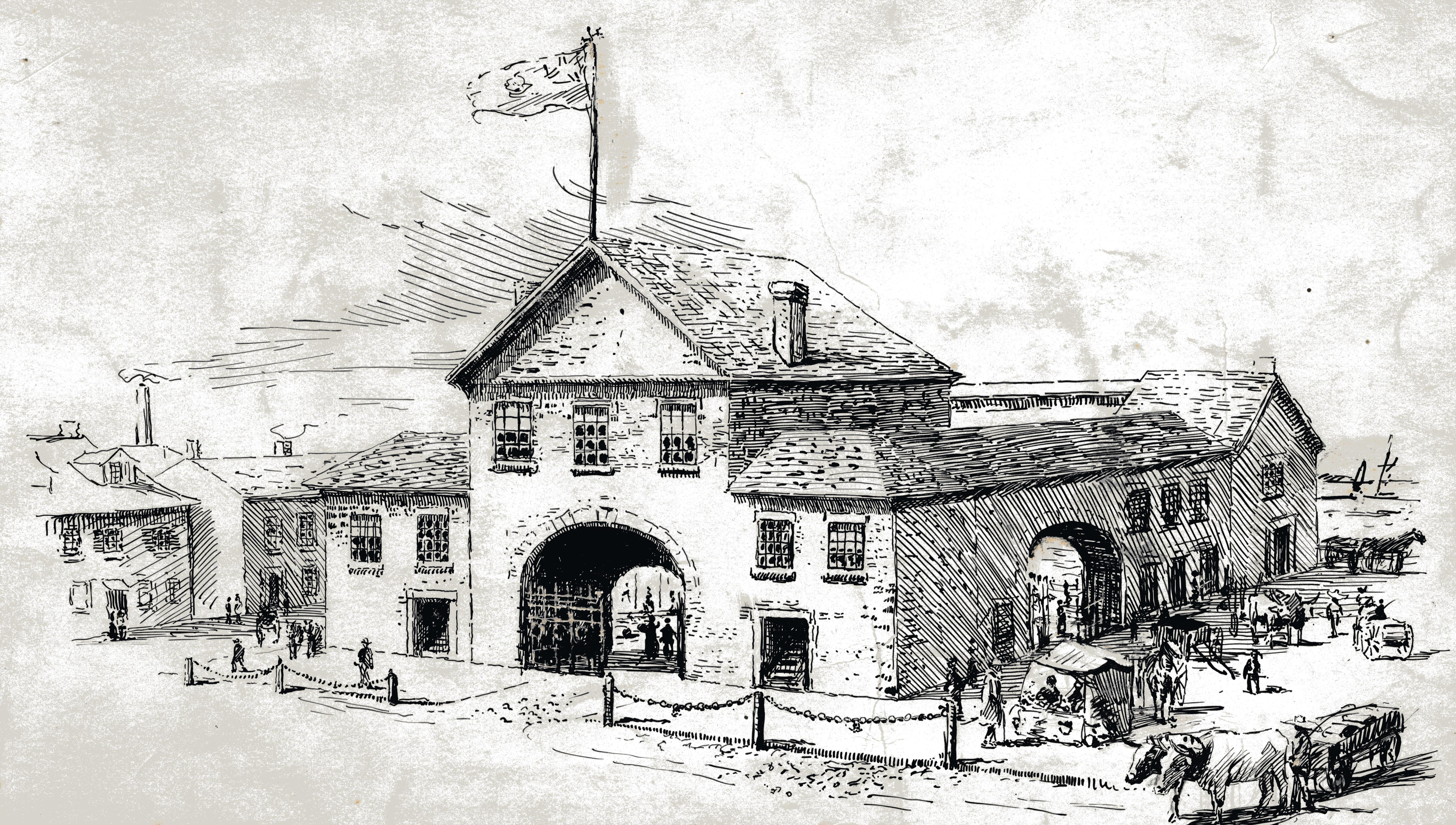
Marketplaces like St. Lawrence Market were commonly used public spaces by political unions.

The Upper Canada Central Political Union was organized in 1832–33 by Thomas David Morrison and collected 19,930 signatures on a petition protesting Mackenzie's expulsion from the House of Assembly. The Reformers won a majority in the elections held in 1834 for the Legislative Assembly of the 12th Parliament of Upper Canada, but the Family Compact held the majority in the Legislative Council. The union was reorganized as the Canadian Alliance Society in 1835 and adopted much of the platform of the Owenite National Union of the Working Classes in London, England, that were to be integrated into the Chartist movement in England. In pursuit of this democratic goal, the Chartists eventually staged a similar armed rebellion, the Newport Rising, in Wales in 1839. The Canadian Alliance Society was reborn as the Constitutional Reform Society in 1836 and was led by the more moderate reformer William W. Baldwin. The society took its final form as the Toronto Political Union in 1837, and they organized local "Vigilance Committees" to elect delegates to a Constitutional Convention in July 1837. This became the organizational structure for the rebellion, and most of the rebel organizers were elected Constitutional Convention delegates.

=== Francis Bond Head and the elections of 1836 ===
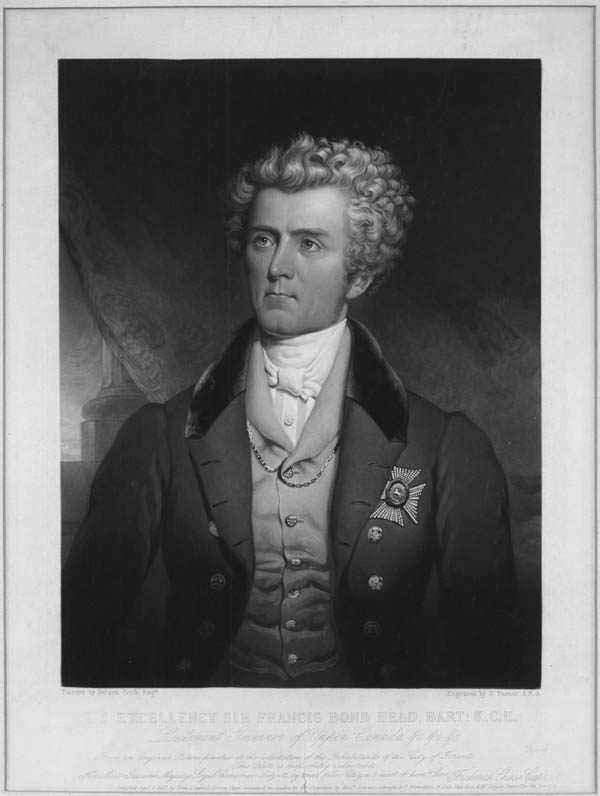
The appointment of Francis Bond Head as the Lieutenant Governor of Upper Canada was initially warmly greeted, though his administration was later met with controversy.

Sir Francis Bond Head was appointed as lieutenant governor, and the Reform movement believed he would support their ideas. After meeting with Reformers, Head concluded that they were disloyal to the British Empire and allied himself with the Family Compact. He refused proposals to bring responsible government to Upper Canada, responding in a sarcastic tone that belittled reformers. The Reform-dominated Assembly responded by refusing to pass the money bill, which halted the payment of salaries and pensions to many government workers. Head then refused to pass any legislation from that government session including major public works projects. This caused a recession in Upper Canada. The movement was disappointed when Head made it clear he had no intention of consulting the Executive Council in the daily operations of the administration. The Executive Council resigned, provoking widespread discontent and an election in 1834.

Unlike previous lieutenant governors, Head actively supported Tory candidates and utilized Orange Order violence in order to ensure their election. He appealed to the people's desire to remain part of the British Empire and a paternalistic attitude of the Crown providing goods for the people. Reformers such as Mackenzie and Samuel Lount lost their seats in the Legislature, and they alleged that the election was fraudulent. They prepared a petition to the Crown protesting the abuses, carried to London by Charles Duncombe, but the Colonial Office refused to hear him. The new Tory-dominated legislature passed laws that exacerbated tensions including continuing the legislative session after the death of the king, prohibiting members of the legislature from serving as executive councillors, making it easier to sue indebted farmers, protecting the Bank of Upper Canada from bankruptcy, and giving legislative councillors charters for their own banks.

=== Collapse of the international financial system ===
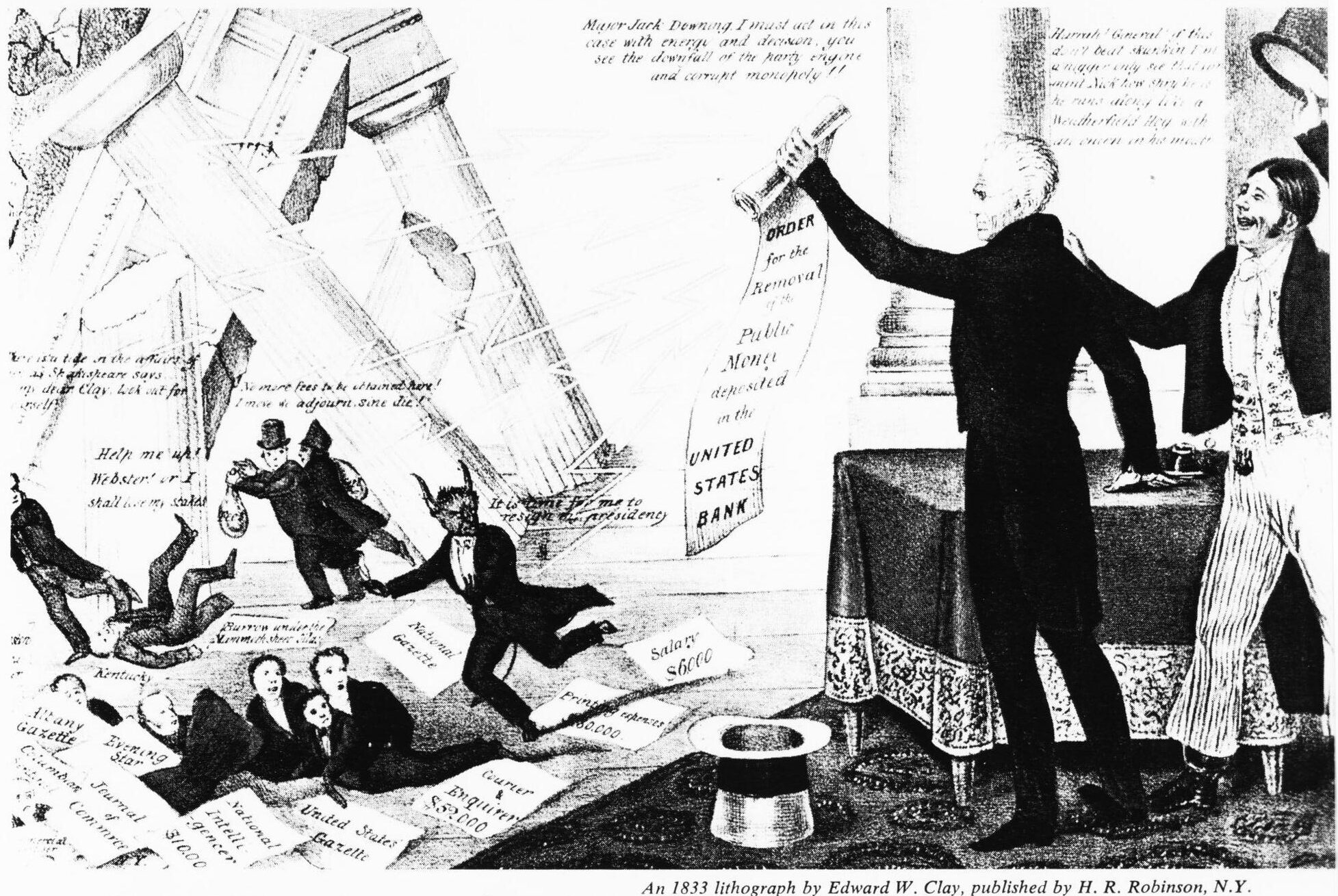
Democratic cartoon from 1833 showing Jackson destroying the Second Bank of the United States, to the approval of the Uncle Sam like figure to the right, and annoyance of the bank's president, shown as the Devil himself

On July 10, 1832, US President Andrew Jackson vetoed a bill for the refinancing of the Second Bank of the United States, causing a depression in the Anglo-American world. This was worsened in Upper Canada by poor wheat harvests in 1836 and farmers were unable to pay their debts. Most banks, including the Bank of Upper Canada, suspended payments by July 1837 and successfully obtained government support while ordinary farmers and the poor did not. One fifth of British immigrants to Upper Canada were impoverished, and most immigrant farmers lacked the capital to pay for purchased land. Debt collection laws allowed them to be jailed indefinitely until they paid their loans to merchants.

In March 1837 the Tories passed a law making it cheaper to sue farmers by allowing city merchants to sue in the middle of harvest. If the farmer refused to come to court in Toronto, they would automatically forfeit the case and their property would be subjected to a sheriff's sale. Among the more than 150 lawsuits they launched that year, the Bank of Upper Canada sued Sheldon, Dutcher & Co., a foundry and Toronto's largest employer with over 80 employees, bankrupting the company. Mackenzie's first plan for rebellion involved calling on Sheldon & Dutcher's men to storm the city hall, where the militia's guns were stored.

=== Budget of Upper Canada ===
The Reformers were incensed at the debt that the Family Compact incurred as the results of general improvements to the province, such as the Welland Canal. The Upper Canada legislature refused to pass a supply bill in 1836 after Head refused to implement responsible government reforms. In retaliation, Head refused to sign any bills passed by the assembly, including public work projects. This contributed to economic hardship and increased unemployment throughout the province.

== Planning ==
Mackenzie gathered reformers on July 28 and 31, 1837 to discuss their grievances with the government. The meeting created the Committee of Vigilance and signed a declaration urging every community to send delegates to a congress in Toronto and discuss remedies for their concerns. Mackenzie printed the declaration in his newspaper and toured communities north of Toronto to encourage citizens to make similar declarations. Farmers organised target practice sessions and forges in the Home District, and residents in Simcoe County created weapons for the rebellion.

On October 9, 1837, a messenger from the Patriotes of Lower Canada informed Mackenzie that the rebellion in Lower Canada was going to begin. Mackenzie gathered reformers at John Doel's brewery and proposed kidnapping Head, bringing him to city hall and forcing him to let the legislature choose the members of the executive council. If Head refused, they would declare independence from the British Empire. Reformers such as Thomas David Morrison opposed this plan, and the meeting ended without consensus on what to do next.

The next day Mackenzie convinced John Rolph that a rebellion could be successful and happen without anyone being killed. Rolph convinced Morrison to support the rebellion, but they also told Mackenzie to get confirmation of support from rural communities. Mackenzie sought out support in rural communities, but he also proclaimed that an armed rebellion would happen on December 7 and assigned Samuel Lount and Anthony Anderson as commanders. Rolph and Morrison were reluctant about the plan, so Mackenzie sought Anthony Van Egmond to help lead the armed forces.

In November, in the lead-up to the Political Union's Constitutional Convention, Mackenzie published a satire in the Constitution, a round table discussion by John Locke, Benjamin Franklin, George Washington, Oliver Goldsmith and William Pitt and others. As part of this satire, he published a draft republican constitution for the state of Upper Canada that closely resembled the objectives in the constitution of the Canadian Alliance Society in 1834. Mackenzie printed broadsheets listing grievances and a call to arms to communities surrounding Toronto. Mackenzie also printed handbills declaring independence which were distributed to citizens north of Toronto.

=== Counter-rebellion planning ===
Head did not believe the reports that stated the severity of resources and discontent gathered by the rebels. In November 1837, James FitzGibbon was concerned about soldiers leaving Upper Canada going to quell the Lower Canada Rebellion, and he urged Head to keep some troops for protection, which was refused. FitzGibbon's call to arm a militia was also denied, and Head refused an armed guard at the Government House and City Hall. After the Battle of Saint-Denis on November 23, FitzGibbon prepared a list of men that he could contact personally if a rebellion began in Toronto. The mayor of Toronto refused to ring the City Hall bell if a rebellion began because he felt FitzGibbon was causing unnecessary concern over a possible revolt.

A Tory supporter obtained a copy of Mackenzie's declaration and showed it to authorities in Toronto. Government officials met at the Government House on December 2 to discuss how to stop rumours of a rebellion. FitzGibbon warned the men of rebels forging pikes north of the city, and he was appointed adjutant general of the militia.

== Confrontation ==
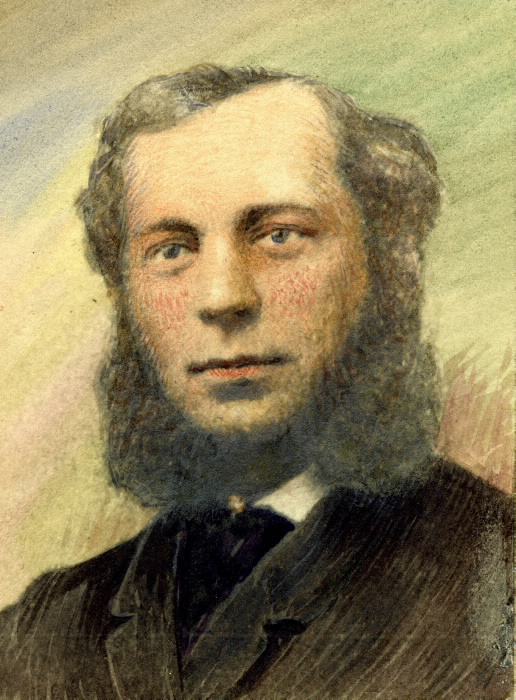
Peter Matthews was one of several delegates in support of revolt, in an October 1837 meeting with other reformists and rebels.

Rolph tried to warn Mackenzie about the warrant for his arrest but could not find him, so he delivered the message to Lount instead. Upon receiving Rolph's message, Lount marched a group of rebels into Toronto for December 4. When hearing about this change, Mackenzie quickly tried to send a messenger to Lount to tell him not to arrive until December 7 but was unable to reach Lount in time. The men gathered at Montgomery's Tavern but were disappointed at the lack of preparation and the failure of the Lower Canada rebels. Although Lount wanted to launch an attack that night, other rebel leaders rejected that plan so that the troops could rest after their march and they could get information from Rolph about the status of rebels who lived in Toronto.

A loyalist named Robert Moodie saw the large gathering at Montgomery's Tavern and rode towards Toronto to warn the officials. The rebels set up a roadblock south of the tavern on Yonge Street that Moodie tried riding through. He was wounded in an ensuing skirmish and taken to the tavern, where he died several hours later. Another horseman saw the rebel's march into Toronto and notified FitzGibbon, who tried unsuccessfully to have officials take action.

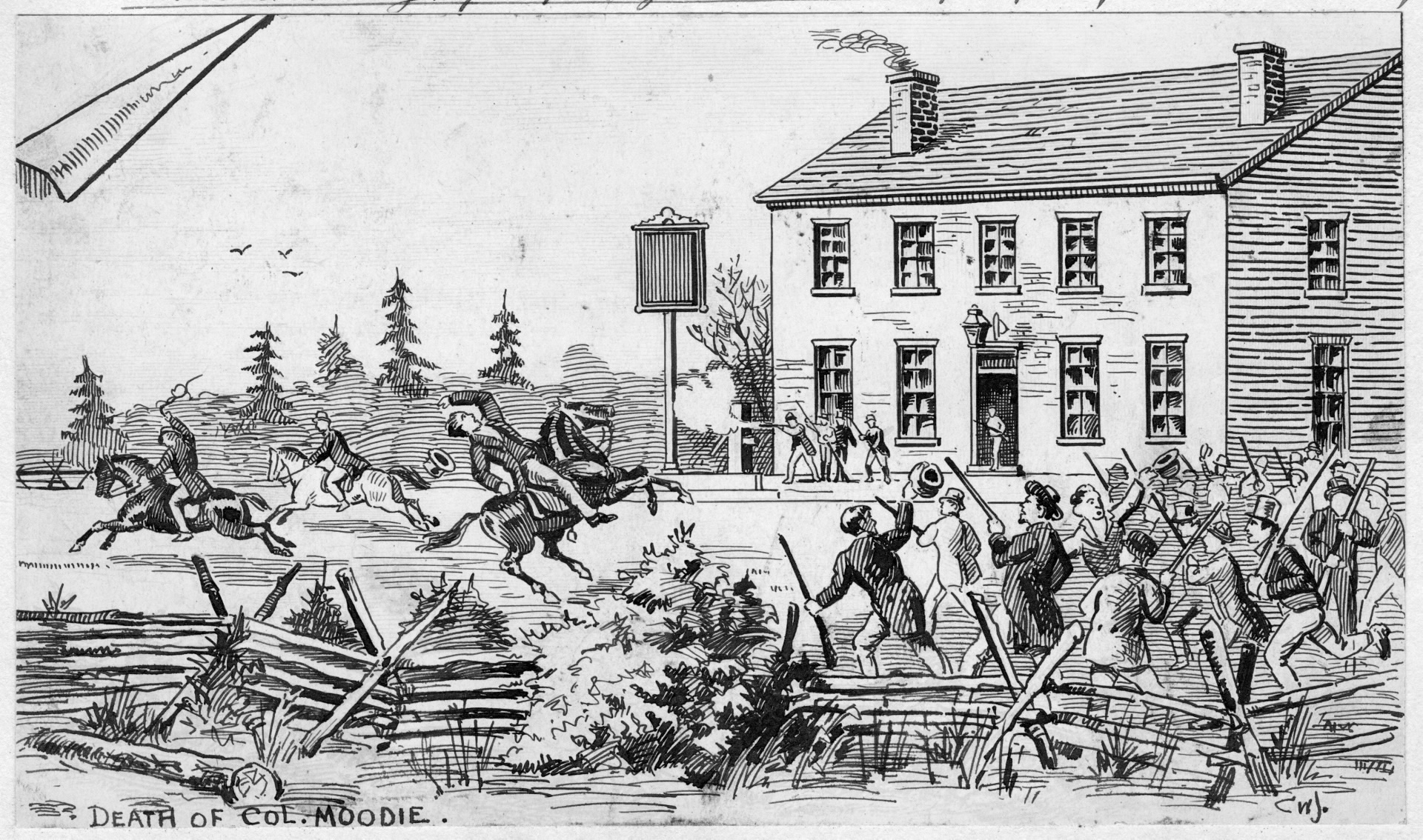
Colonel Robert Moodie was fatally shot outside of Montgomery's Tavern in an attempt to lead loyalists through the roadblock.

On December 4, Mackenzie and other rebels were patrolling the area and encountered Alderman John Powell and Archibald Macdonald. Mackenzie took both men prisoner but did not search them for weapons as they gave their word that they did not have any. As they were approaching Montgomery's Tavern, Powell mortally shot Anthony Anderson in the neck and escaped back to Toronto to report to Head. The rebel leaders met that night to discuss who would become the rebellion's leader after the death of Anderson and Lount's refusal to lead on his own. It was decided that Mackenzie would become the leader.

At noon on December 5, Mackenzie gathered the rebels and marched them towards Toronto. Meanwhile, Head proposed a negotiating session with rebel leaders to Marshall Spring Bidwell, who declined. Head then offered a negotiation with Rolph, who accepted. Rolph and Robert Baldwin met the rebel troops at Gallows Hill and stated the government's proposal of full amnesty to the rebels if they dispersed immediately. Lount and Mackenzie asked that this offer be presented in a written document and a convention be organised to discuss the province's policies. When Rolph and Baldwin returned to Head, they were informed that the government's offer had been withdrawn. Rolph and Baldwin relayed the rejection to the rebels, and Rolph told Mackenzie that they should attack as soon as possible because the city was poorly defended. Instead, Mackenzie spent the day burning down the house of a Bank of Upper Canada official and questioning the loyalty of his troops.

A few hours later Rolph sent a messenger to Mackenzie that Toronto rebels were ready for their arrival to the city, and Mackenzie marched his troops towards Toronto. A group of 26 men led by Samuel Jarvis met the rebels on their march and fired upon them before running away. The rebels believed there were several battalions of troops firing upon them, and several ran away. Lount encouraged some riflemen to return fire before realising that the enemy had left the battlefield. Lount and the riflemen marched to find the rebels who fled and found Mackenzie trying to convince the rebels to continue their path towards Toronto. The rebels refused to march until daylight.

On December 5 Colonel Allan MacNab arrived in Toronto with 60 men from the Hamilton area. Morrison was arrested and charged with treason while Rolph sent a letter encouraging Mackenzie to send the rebels home, then he fled to the United States. Mackenzie ignored the letter and continued his plan for rebellion.

On the morning of December 6 Peter Matthews arrived at the tavern with 60 men, but Mackenzie could still not convince the rebel forces to march towards Toronto. Instead, they decided to wait for Anthony Van Egmond to lead the rebellion into Toronto. The rebels raided a mail coach, stole the passenger's money and looked for information about the progress of the rebellion in London, Upper Canada. Mackenzie also attacked other travellers and robbed them or questioned them about the revolt.

The government organised a council of war and agreed to attack the rebels on December 7. FitzGibbon was appointed commander of the government's forces. Although initially believing the government's position was untenable, he was inspired by a company of men that formed to defend the government. At noon Head ordered that the troops, consisting of 1,200 men and two cannons, march towards the rebels.

== Battle of Montgomery's Tavern ==
Van Egmond arrived at the tavern on December 7 and encouraged the rebel leaders to disperse, as he felt the rebellion would not be a success. His advice was rejected, so he proposed entrenching and defending their position at the tavern. Mackenzie disagreed and wanted to attack the government troops. They agreed to send 60 men to the Don Bridge to divert government troops. That afternoon a sentinel reported the government force's arrival from Gallows Hill, with MacNab leading them. At this point only 200 men at Montgomery's Tavern were armed. The armed forces were split into two companies and went to fields on both sides of Yonge Street. The rebels without arms were sent to the tavern with their prisoners.

MacNab's forces split into two companies when the rebels fired upon them. The rebels dispersed in a panic after the first round of firing, thinking their front row had been killed when they were simply dropping to the ground to allow those behind them to fire. The government continued their march and at Montgomery's Tavern shot a cannon into the dining room window. The rebels fled north, and the morale of the rebellion was irreparably broken. Head ordered the tavern burned and the rebels arrested.

== London rebellion ==
News of the intended rebellion had reached London, Upper Canada and its surrounding townships by December 7. It was initially thought that the Toronto rebellion was successful, contributing to Charles Duncombe wanting to rise up as well. Upon hearing more details about the rebellion in Toronto, Duncombe convened a series of public meetings to spread news of the supposed atrocities committed by Head against all suspected reformers to help increase anti-government support. It is estimated that there were between 400 and 500 rebels who assembled under Duncombe.

MacNab was sent to engage Duncombe's uprising, arriving in Brantford on December 13. Although many rebels including Duncombe had fled prior to the upcoming battle after hearing about the failure of Mackenzie in Toronto and general disorganization, there were still some present in Scotland, Ontario, and MacNab commenced his attack on Scotland on December 14, causing the remaining rebels to flee after only a few shots were fired. The victorious Tory supporters burned homes and farms of known rebels and suspected supporters. In the 1860s, some of the former rebels were compensated by the Canadian government for their lost property in the rebellion aftermath.

== Patriot War ==
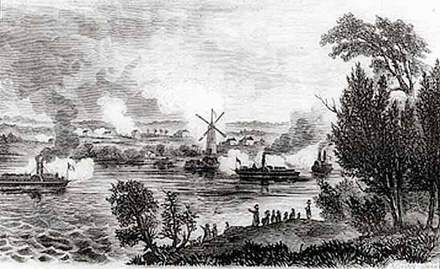
British forces and the Canadian militia defeated an invasion attempt by a Hunters' Lodges paramilitary unit based in the United States.

The rebels from Toronto travelled to the United States in groups of two. Mackenzie, Duncombe, Rolph and 200 supporters fled to Navy Island in the Niagara River and declared themselves the Republic of Canada on December 13. They obtained supplies from supporters in the United States, resulting in the Caroline affair. On January 13, 1838, under attack by British armaments, the rebels fled. Mackenzie went to the United States mainland where he was arrested for violating the Neutrality Act.

The rebels continued their raids into Canada using the U.S. as a base of operations and, in cooperation with the U.S. Hunters' Lodges, dedicated themselves to the overthrow of British rule in Canada. The raids did not end until the rebels and Hunters were defeated at the Battle of the Windmill, 11 months after the initial battle at Montgomery's Tavern.

== Aftermath ==
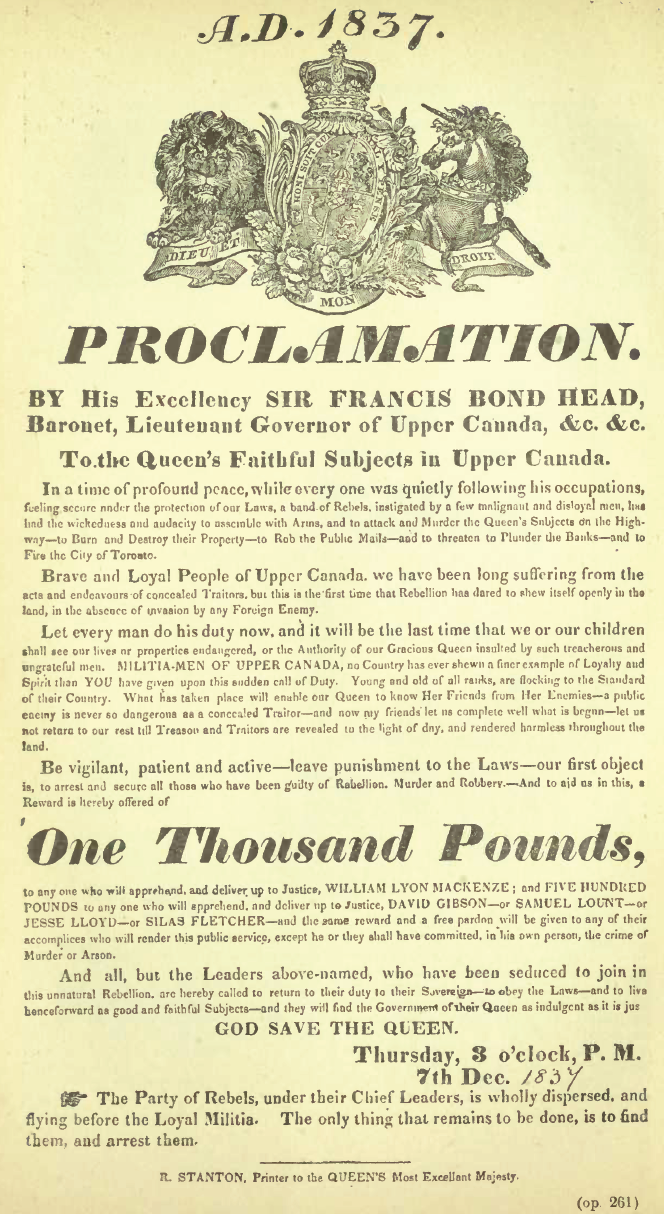
Proclamation from December 1837, offering a reward for the capture of William Lyon Mackenzie.

The British government was concerned about the rebellion, especially in light of the strong popular support for the rebels in the United States and the Lower Canada Rebellion. Head was recalled in late 1837 and replaced by Sir George Arthur who arrived in Toronto in March 1838. Parliament also sent Lord Durham to become governor-in-chief of the British North American colonies, so that Arthur reported to Durham. Durham was assigned to report on the grievances among the British North American colonists and find a way to appease them. His report eventually led to greater autonomy in the Canadian colonies and the union of Upper and Lower Canada into the Province of Canada in 1840.

Over 800 people were arrested after the rebellion for being Reform sympathisers. Van Egmond died of an illness he acquired while imprisoned while Lount and Peter Matthews were sentenced to the gallows for leading the rebellion. Other rebels were also sentenced to hang, and 92 men were sent to Van Diemen's Land. A group of rebels escaped their prison at Fort Henry and travelled to the United States. A general pardon for everyone but Mackenzie was issued in 1845; Mackenzie was pardoned in 1849 and allowed to return to Canada, where he resumed his political career.

=== Historical significance ===
John Charles Dent, writing in 1885, said the rebellion was a reaction from the public of the government mismanagement of the minority ruling elite. Frederick Armstrong believed the rebellion was a reaction to patronage afforded to members of the Family Compact after winning the 1836 election. Dent writes that the rebellion caused Britain to notice the concerns of Canadian reformers and reconsider their colonial rule of the province. He opines the rebellion hastened the changes Reformers advocated by drawing attention to the province from the Colonial Office and the production of the Durham Report.

Paul Romney argues that the above assessments are a failure of historical imagination and the outcome of an explicit strategy adopted by Reformers in the face of charges of disloyalty to Britain in the wake of the rebellion. In recounting the “myths of responsible government”, Romney opines that after the ascendancy of Loyalism as the dominant political ideology of Upper Canada any demand for democracy or for responsible government became a challenge to colonial sovereignty. In his view, the linkage of the "fight for responsible government" with disloyalty was solidified by the rebellion, as reformers took up arms to finally break the "baneful domination" of the mother country. Struggling to avoid the charge of sedition, Reformers later purposefully obscured their true aims of independence from Britain and focused on their grievances against the Family Compact. Thus, responsible government became a "pragmatic" policy of alleviating local abuses, rather than a revolutionary anti-colonial moment.

William Kilbourn states that the removal of Radicals from Upper Canada politics, either through execution or their retreat to the United States, allowed the Clear Grits to be formed as a more moderate political force that had fewer disagreements with the Tories than the Reformers.

== See also ==
- Benjamin Milliken II
- History of Canada
- List of incidents of civil unrest in Canada
- Rebellions of 1837
