= Battle of Windsor =

1838 battle of the Upper Canada Rebellion

Coordinates: 42°17′N 83°00′W

- Part of the Patriot War, Rebellions of 1837
Date	December 4, 1838
Location	Michigan area, USA; Windsor, Upper Canada area
Result	Anglo-American victory

Belligerents
Upper Canada; United Kingdom; United States	Hunter Patriots

Commanders and leaders
(Upper Canada) John Sparks (Upper Canada) John Prince (United Kingdom of Great Britain and Ireland) Richard Airey (United States) Hugh Brady (United States) Stevens Mason	Lucius Bierce

Strength
300 Canadian Militia/British Regulars; U.S. Forces	400 Hunter Patriots

Casualties and losses
8 dead 1 steamship	25 dead 44–65 captured

The Battle of Windsor was a short-lived campaign in the eastern Michigan area of the United States and the Windsor area of Upper Canada. A group of men on both sides of the border, calling themselves "Patriots", formed small militias in 1837 with the intention of seizing the Southern Ontario peninsula between the Detroit and Niagara Rivers and extending American-style government to Canada. They based groups in Michigan at Fort Gratiot (present Port Huron), Mount Clemens, Detroit, and Gibraltar. The Patriots were defeated by British and American government forces, respectively.

== Beginnings ==
In December 1837, Thomas Jefferson Sutherland was commissioned by the rebellion leaders on Navy Island in the Niagara River to head to Detroit to raise a force there. After the Navy Island base was evacuated, other Patriots came to Detroit. Public meetings were held in Detroit and an invasion force was organized. Men came to Detroit from as far away as Illinois and Kentucky to join the movement. Concerned that they would seize the U.S. arsenal at Fort Gratiot, U.S. General Hugh Brady ordered the weapons removed by boat. The steamship, however, became stuck in the ice at St. Clair, Michigan, and the journey to Detroit had to be completed by wagon. On January 5, 1838, the Detroit jail was raided and the Patriots seized the 450 muskets which had been stored there to keep them away from the rebels. The rebels were reported to have later stolen another 200 weapons from the unsecured office of the U.S. marshal in Detroit, perhaps with his help.

== Schooner Ann ==
The schooner Ann was seized by the Patriots on January 8 and sailed to Gibraltar, Michigan. The governor of Michigan, Stevens T. Mason, along with a detachment of 200 militiamen, pursued them in two steamships. 100 Canadian militia also followed in the steamer Alliance. Mason met with the Patriot leaders at Gibraltar, but the captured steamship Ann continued on to near Fort Malden on the Canadian shore. On January 9, the Patriots began shelling Malden and the town of Amherstburg from the Ann. The Canadian militia took up positions in the town while the Patriots moved 300 men onto the Canadian Bois Blanc Island opposite the town. The Canadian militia opened fire on the schooner when it tried to reach the island. The Canadians shot several of the ship crew and damaged the sails and rigging. The ship drifted until it ran aground, at which point the Canadian militia boarded it, encountered no resistance and captured the Patriot crew. The remaining Patriot forces quit Bois Blanc for the safety of the American side of the river. Several of the Patriots were wounded, a few killed, and the Canadians captured 300 muskets, two cannon, 10 kegs of gunpowder and various accoutrements.

After losing the Ann, the Patriots stole another ship, the steamer Little Erie. The head of the Detroit militia, himself, tried to prevent the boat leaving at swordpoint and the U.S. marshal's force was reported to have fired into the air, but the local crowd supported the Patriot movement and the boat was taken to Gibraltar. On January 27, three companies of U.S. troops arrived from Buffalo aboard the steamer Robert Fulton to help calm the area. Governor Mason met with the Patriots at Gibraltar on February 12, again to no avail. In fact, that same day, Patriots raided the U.S. arsenal in Dearborn, Michigan, stealing hundreds of weapons. This group of weapons was soon recovered, having been hidden near a tavern in Detroit.

== Fighting Island and Pelee Island ==
On February 24, 1838, a group of Patriots began assembling on Fighting Island on the Canadian side of the Detroit River. Supplies were ferried over from Detroit and some 400 Patriots from Cleveland joined the Detroit area men. The larger force of 600 Cleveland men occupied Pelee Island at the same time. It was reported that the Patriots had only 50 muskets and one dismounted cannon among them on the island. The U.S. general informed his British counterpart of the assembly, announcing that he would wait for the Patriots to break up and arrest them upon their return for violation of American neutrality laws. The British commandant replied that he would attack the Patriot camp and pursue them into the United States. This reply led General Brady to order a line of red flags to be placed in the ice on the river marking the border. He deployed his men with orders to shoot any British soldiers passing the line.

The British regulars, artillery and Canadian militia attacked at daybreak of February 25. The British force proceeded across the ice to capture the island but did not cross the border. The U.S. forces briefly detained a few Patriots but soon released them. Casualties are uncertain, with the British commander claiming no deaths on either side but other reports claiming 5 British dead and 15 wounded and at least 5 Patriots wounded, some of whom required amputations of their arms.

On March 23, in a much bloodier engagement, a British and Canadian force drove the Patriots from Pelee Island.

== Waiting ==
After the engagements at Fighting Island and Pelee Island, U.S. and Canadian troops patrolled their sides of the border, and little Patriot Hunter activity occurred in the Detroit-Windsor area. Larger battles occurred along the St. Lawrence and at Short Hills with large Patriot losses. The Patriots were not yet finished, however. Activity around Detroit picked up again with the return of winter.

== Renewed action ==
On November 24, 1838, General Brady on the steamer Illinois captured a Patriot ship with 250 weapons and a supply of ammunition. He returned to Detroit to find that his own troops' weapons had been stolen from city hall in his absence. The theft was soon solved, and the weapons were recovered after two days. The Hunter Lodge at Port Huron with its Sarnia counterparts across the river planned an invasion at the beginning of December, but reinforcements from Detroit did not arrive. British officials in Canada became aware of the plot and deployed troops and artillery along that section of the border, ending the plan. Throughout November, some 300 Ohio and Pennsylvania Patriots assembled at a field south of the city of Detroit, joining a couple hundred locals and Canadians.

On December 4, 1838, at 2 am, the Patriots crossed the Detroit River into Canada on a captured steamboat, the Champlain, and engaged in an unsuccessful battle at Windsor where the Patriots set the British barracks on fire, burned the steamer Thames and several houses, and killed four militiamen before taking positions at the Baby farm, which contained a large orchard. Only 20 militia were billeted at Windsor, a small town of around 300, while some miles further south at Sandwich and Amherstburg were the bulk of the 500 militia and regulars.

At about 7 am, a 60-man company of Canadian militia commanded by Arthur Rankin from Sandwich repelled the invasion before the regulars arrived and captured several Patriots. The militia pushed the Patriots out of the orchard and pursued them through the town. The Patriots then fled in several directions, some returning to their steamer to free the 18 prisoners they had taken. Colonel John Prince arrived after the rout (9:30 am) and took command. Prince then moved his troops back to Sandwich, fearing another attack there.

At 1:30 pm, a company of British regulars from the 34th (Cumberland) Regiment of Foot with a six-pound cannon and 20 mounted Aboriginals arrived at Sandwich and continued north to Windsor. Prince decided to follow with his 400 militiamen. However, all of the Patriots had made their escape by this time, and only one of them was captured. Prince ordered that four prisoners be immediately shot without having been tried in court. The British cannon fired some shots at Patriots fleeing in stolen canoes, hitting one in the arm. The U.S. steamer Erie carrying Detroit militia captured some of the Patriots but soon released them on U.S. soil.

== Legacy ==
In 1966, the Archaeological and Historic Sites Board of Ontario erected a Provincial Military plaque on the grounds of the Hiram Walker Historical Museum:

The Battle of Windsor 1838 - Early on December 4, 1838, a force of about 140 American and Canadian supporters of William Lyon Mackenzie crossed the river from Detroit and landed about one mile east of here. After capturing and burning a nearby militia barracks, they took possession of Windsor. In this vicinity they were met and routed by a force of some 130 militiamen commanded by Colonel John Prince. Four of the invaders taken prisoner were executed summarily by order of Colonel Prince. This action caused violent controversy in both Canada and the United States. The remaining captives were tried and sentenced at London, Upper Canada. Six were executed, eighteen transported to a penal colony in Van Diemen's Land (Tasmania) and sixteen deported.

== Aftermath ==
After the second pursuit, Colonel Prince lined up another seven prisoners in front of the burned barracks and ordered them shot as well. Influential local citizens dissuaded him from this action. Local citizens later published a circular against Prince, leading one of them, William R. Wood, to have to duel him. Prince survived the duel unharmed. A court martial mostly exonerated him, but the matter made its way to the floor of Parliament. No censure occurred there either as the Duke of Wellington steered the discussion away from Prince to the general topic of the need to use regular troops to defend Canada from American invasion.

Joshua Doan of Sparta, Upper Canada, was among the several dozen Hunter Patriots captured in Windsor, and he was later hanged for treason. Other were sentenced to be transported to Van Diemen's Land, others to Bermuda.

The Michigan militia remained stationed at the United States Arsenal in Dearborn, and were used to track down remaining groups of Patriots in the area. This conflict led to the reorganization of the Michigan militia because its structure was found to be insufficient to deal with such rebellions. The U.S. Army constructed Fort Wayne in Detroit in 1842 to strengthen U.S. defenses as a counter to Fort Malden in Amherstburg, rebuilt during the war. The blockhouses built by the British on Bois Blanc Island during the war were manned until the 1850s.

These events at Windsor formed the last military action of the rebellions in Upper and Lower Canada of 1837–38.

An Ontario Historical Plaque was erected by the province to commemorate the Battle of Windsor's role in Ontario's heritage.

== See also ==
- Hunter Patriots
- Battle of the Windmill
