= Arthur Rankin (surveyor) =

Canadian surveyor and politician (1816–1893)

Member of the Legislative Assembly of the Province of Canada for Essex
- In office 1854–1857
- Monarch: Victoria
- Governors General: Lord Elgin (1854); Edmund Walker Head (1854–57)
- Preceded by: John Prince
- Succeeded by: John McLeod

Member of the Legislative Assembly of the Province of Canada for Essex
- In office 1861–1867
- Monarch: Victoria
- Governors General: Edmund Walker Head (1861); Viscount Monck (1861–63)
- Preceded by: John McLeod
- Succeeded by: Solomon Wigle

Personal details
- Born: 1816 Montreal, Lower Canada
- Died: March 13, 1893 (age 76–77) Windsor, Ontario, Canada
- Spouse: Mary McKee
- Relations: Charles Rankin (brother)
- Children: 2, McKee Rankin

Arthur Rankin (1816 – March 13, 1893) was a surveyor, entrepreneur, militia officer, and political figure in Canada West.

== Life and career ==
Rankin was born in Montreal in 1816, the son of Irish immigrants George Rankin and Mary Stuart. He ran away from home at the age of 15, and became a cabin boy on a New York-to-London packet boat. In 1835, he returned to Canada and apprenticed with his brother, Charles Rankin, to be a surveyor in the Windsor area.

In 1837, Rankin moved to Toronto where he received a commission as an ensign for the 2nd Queen's Light Infantry. While on leave in Ohio, Rankin attacked two bounty hunters who had captured an escaped slave from Kentucky. Rankin smuggled the man from Cleveland, Ohio, to Toronto.

Rankin transferred to the 2nd Battalion of Provincial Volunteer Militia and, in 1838, took part in the Battle of Windsor, fighting to recapture Pelee Island from the Patriots. Later that year, a group of patriots attacked Windsor, killing four militiamen, and setting fire to the British barracks, the steamer Thames, and several houses. Rankin mustered a company of 60 men who helped chase the American Patriots from their position at a local farm.

After his discharge in 1843, Rankin organized nine Ojibwes from a reserve along the St. Clair River into a "wild west" show that toured the British Isles with a special performance for Queen Victoria. He sold his show to George Catlin in 1844 and returned to Canada where he established the Sandwich Wester Standard and Western District General Advertiser with himself as publisher and editor.

Rankin returned to surveying and, in 1846, discovered a large copper deposit at Bruce Mines, along the north shore of Lake Huron. He sold his share to the Montreal Mining Company in 1847.

In 1851, Rankin ran for a seat in the Legislative Assembly in Kent but was defeated by George Brown. He was elected to the 5th Parliament of the Province of Canada in Essex in 1854. He was implicated in an 1857 scandal involving the construction of a new railway line in south-western Canada West; Rankin was defeated in the election that followed. Shortly after that, he helped launch successful copper mining operations along Lake Superior and Lake Huron.

In 1861, Rankin was elected again in Essex. Later that year, he attempted to raise a regiment of Canadians, the 1st United States Lancer Regiment, to serve in the Union Army during the American Civil War. Rankin's proposed regiment was controversial in Canada; the Detroit Free Press praised him and predicted the popularity of the regiment, while the Montreal Gazette criticized him as a "Reckless soldier of fortune".

He was arrested under the Foreign Enlistment Act and forced to resign from the Union Army; in 1863, his election was declared invalid. He was elected again in the general election of 1863. He was a strong supporter of the forming of a Canadian Confederation but did not win a seat in the election held in 1867 for the 1st Canadian Parliament. Rankin died in Windsor in 1893 after a long illness. He is buried in the Sandwich Cemetery.

== Personal life ==
In 1840, Rankin married Mary McKee, great-granddaughter of Alexander McKee, Superintendent of Indian Affairs. They had two sons: George Cameron and Arthur McKee Rankin. Through McKee, Rankin has had a number of notable descendants. This includes his actress granddaughters, Gladys, Phyllis, and Doris Rankin, as well as grandsons, Sidney Rankin Drew, Arthur Rankin, and Arthur Rankin Jr..
