= Schoultz =

Schoultz, Schöultz, or von Schoultz is a surname. Notable people with the surname include:

- Johanna von Schoultz, Finnish-Swedish opera singer
- Nils von Schoultz
- Solveig von Schoultz
- Phillip Schoultz
- Robert F. Schoultz
