= Essex Militia =

- Active: c.1793-1866
- Country: Upper Canada
- Allegiance: British Empire
- Branch: Canadian Militia
- Type: Militia
- Size: 2-3 Regiments
- Garrison/HQ: Essex County, Ontario
- Engagements: War of 1812: Battle of Brownstown; Siege of Detroit; Siege of Fort Meigs; Battle of Frenchtown; Battle of the Thames; Battle of Longwoods; Battle of Lundy's Lane; Patriot War: Battle of Windsor; Battle of Pelee Island; Fenian Raids

The Essex County Militia, also commonly known as the Essex Militia, were a volunteer militia unit in Upper Canada (present-day southwestern Ontario) and later the Province of Canada formed after the passage of the Militia Act of 1793. Organized from the local settler population of Essex County, it served principally during the War of 1812 and later during the Rebellions of 1837–1838.

== Early years ==
Militia service in Upper Canada was based on compulsory enrolment of able-bodied male inhabitants. A local history of Essex County states that the Militia Act of 1793 required men aged 16 to 50 to belong to a militia unit, with exemptions for certain Crown officials, clergy, and workers considered essential.

Essex and Kent counties were among the earliest areas of Upper Canada to organize militia units. In 1794, the Essex Militia included 72 men from the “New Settlement”; it was later divided into North and South battalions, which became the basis for the 1st and 2nd Regiments of Essex Militia.

== War of 1812 ==
At the outbreak of the War of 1812, the Essex Militia was mobilized to reinforce the British garrison at Fort Amherstburg against an American invasion from Michigan. The region’s small population, reliance on agriculture, and proximity to the United States made loyalty and recruitment difficult; many local militiamen initially deserted or refused to report.

Major-General Sir Isaac Brock arrived at Amherstburg on 14 August 1812 and demanded that local militia report for duty or be treated as deserters. Men from Colchester and other Essex communities subsequently joined the British force that, together with First Nations warriors led by Tecumseh, crossed the Detroit River and compelled Brigadier-General William Hull’s surrender of Fort Detroit on 16 August 1812.

Detachments from the 1st and 2nd Essex Militia served in campaigns in Michigan and Ohio during 1812 and 1813. In September 1812, a detachment accompanied Major Adam Muir’s expedition against Fort Wayne, and the following month another detachment occupied an advanced position at the Miami Rapids. During the winter, Essex militiamen performed garrison duty at Amherstburg, Detroit, and Mackinac.

On 22 January 1813, twelve officers and 104 men of the 1st Essex and nine officers and 87 men of the 2nd Essex, under Major Robert Reynolds, took part in the Battle of the River Raisin. Five privates were killed and sixteen wounded.

From 23 April to 9 May 1813, 34 officers and 482 Essex militiamen participated in the expedition against Fort Meigs on the Miami River. Captain Bondy of the 1st Essex was killed in action, and four privates were wounded.

== Patriot War ==
The Essex Militia was again called out during the Upper Canada Rebellion and the Patriot War of 1837–1838, when American-supported rebels attempted to incite an uprising in Upper Canada. In January 1838, the Patriot schooner Anne attacked Amherstburg and Fort Malden; Essex militiamen, armed mainly with muskets, helped respond to the assault. After the vessel ran aground at Elliott’s Point, militia forces waded into the water and captured the ship and its commander, Brigadier-General Edward Alexander Theller.

Two Black militia companies served in Essex during this period: Captain Josiah Henson’s 1st Black Company and Captain Angus MacDonald’s 2nd Black Company.

Essex and Kent volunteers also fought at Amherstburg, Fighting Island, Pelee Island, and Windsor during the Patriot War. By that time, Essex County had three militia regiments.

=== Battle of Windsor ===
The final major Patriot attack in the region came in December 1838, when raiders crossed from Belle Isle and attacked Windsor. They occupied the Baby farm, now the site of the Windsor Community Museum, before local militia arrived from Sandwich and defeated them. Colonel John Prince, commander of the 3rd Essex Militia, took part in the capture of the Anne and in the battles of Fighting Island and Pelee Island.

== Later years ==
Both the Essex and Kent militia units were called out during the Trent Affair crisis of 1861 and the Fenian Raids of 1866, but the old county regiments were repeatedly disbanded or neglected between emergencies, leaving no continuous institutional history.

A permanent successor was created on 12 June 1885 as the 21st Essex Battalion of Infantry, later renamed the 21st Regiment Essex Fusiliers, The Essex Scottish, and finally, after amalgamation with The Kent Regiment in 1954, The Essex and Kent Scottish.

== Perpetuation ==
Within the Canadian Army, the 1st and 2nd Regiments of Essex Militia are perpetuated by the Essex and Kent Scottish; and the regiment bears the War of 1812 battle honours won by the Essex Militia:

- Defence of Canada – 1812–1815 – Défense du Canada
- Detroit
- Maumee
- Niagara

== Notable members ==
- Colonel Matthew Elliot
- Colonel John Prince
- Colonel William Elliott
- Lieutenant Colonel William Caldwell
- Lieutenant Colonel Samuel Smith MacDonell
- Major Thomas McKee
- Captain Richard Pattinson
- Captain Jean-Baptiste Maçon
- Captain Francis Xavier Caldwell

== See also ==
- Canadian units of the War of 1812
