= Benjamin Wait =

- Benjamin Waite on a British ship heading to Van Dieman's Land
- Born: September 7, 1813; Markham Township, Upper Canada
- Died: November 9, 1895 (aged 82); Grand Rapids, Michigan
- Spouse(s): Maria Smith (1836–1843); Rebecca H. Sealey (1845–1894)

Benjamin Wait (September 7, 1813 – November 9, 1895) or Waite was a Canadian businessman and writer. One of his most well-known works is Letters from Van Dieman's Land, which he published in 1843. Benjamin Wait also served as a major during the Upper Canada Rebellion and subsequent Patriot War, leading forces at the Battle of Pelee Island and Raid on Short Hills.
