= Battle of Albuera order of battle =

This is the order of battle for the Battle of Albuera (16 May 1811). The Battle of Albuera was an engagement of the Peninsular War, fought between a mixed British, Spanish, and Portuguese corps and elements of the French Armée du Midi (Army of the South). It took place at the small Spanish village of Albuera, about 12 miles (20 km) south of the frontier fortress-town of Badajoz, Spain. Marshal Sir William Beresford had been given the task of reconstructing the Portuguese army since February 1809. He temporarily took command of General Rowland Hill's corps while Hill was recovering from illness, and was granted overall command of the Allied army at Albuera by the Spanish generals, Joaquín Blake y Joyes and Francisco Castaños.

== Abbreviations used ==
=== Military rank ===
- Gen = General
- Lt Gen = Lieutenant-General
- Maj Gen = Major-General
- GD = général de division
- Brig Gen = Brigadier-General
- GB = général de brigade
- Col = Colonel
- Lt Col = Lieutenant Colonel
- Maj = Major
- Capt = Captain
- Lt = Lieutenant

=== Other ===
- (w) = wounded
- (mw) = mortally wounded
- (k) = killed in action
- (c) = captured

== Allied army ==
Commander-in-Chief of the Allied Army: Marshal William C. Beresford

=== Anglo-Portuguese Forces ===
Division	Brigade	Regiments and Others
2nd Division Maj-Gen William Stewart (5,460 total)	1st Brigade Lt-Col John Colborne (2,066 total)	1st Battalion, 3rd Regiment of Foot (755); 2nd Battalion, 31st Regiment of Foot (418); 2nd Battalion, 48th Regiment of Foot (452); 2nd Battalion, 66th Regiment of Foot (441)
2nd Division Maj-Gen William Stewart (5,460 total)	2nd Brigade Maj-Gen Daniel Hoghton (1,651 total)	29th Regiment of Foot (507); 1st Battalion, 48th Regiment of Foot (497); 1st Battalion, 57th Regiment of Foot (647)
2nd Division Maj-Gen William Stewart (5,460 total)	3rd Brigade Lt-Col Alexander Abercrombie (1,597 total)	2nd Battalion, 28th Regiment of Foot (519); 2nd Battalion, 34th Regiment of Foot (596); 2nd Battalion, 39th Regiment of Foot (482)
2nd Division Maj-Gen William Stewart (5,460 total)	Divisional light troops	3 companies, 5th Battalion, 60th Regiment of Foot (146)
4th Division Maj-Gen Lowry Cole (5,107 total)	1st Brigade Lt-Col Sir William Myers (2,015 total)	1st Battalion, 7th Fusiliers (714); 2nd Battalion, 7th Fusiliers (568); 1st Battalion, Royal Welch Fusiliers (733)
4th Division Maj-Gen Lowry Cole (5,107 total)	2nd Brigade Lt-Col James Kemmis (165 total)	One company each of: 2/27th Foot; 1/40th Foot; 97th Foot Queen's Germans; (165)
4th Division Maj-Gen Lowry Cole (5,107 total)	Portuguese Brigade Brig-Gen William Harvey (2,927 total)	11th Portuguese Line Regiment (2 bns, 1,154); 23rd Portuguese Line Regiment (2 bns, 1,201); Lusitanian Legion (1 Bn, 572)
Hamilton's Division Maj-Gen John Hamilton (4,819 total)	1st Brigade Brig-Gen Archibald Campbell (2,390 total)	4th Portuguese Line Regiment (2 bns, 1,271); 10th Portuguese Line Regiment (2 bns, 1,119)
Hamilton's Division Maj-Gen John Hamilton (4,819 total)	2nd Brigade Brig-Gen A. Luiz Fonseca (2,429 total)	2nd Portuguese Line Regiment (2 bns, 1,225); 14th Portuguese Line Regiment (2 bns, 1,204)
Independent Brigades (2,483 total)	KGL brigade Maj-Gen Charles Alten (1,098 total)	1st Light Battalion KGL (588); 2nd Light Battalion KGL (510)
Independent Brigades (2,483 total)	Collins's Brigade Col Richard Collins (1,385 total)	5th Portuguese Line Regiment (2 bns, 985); 5th Caçadores (1 bn, 400)
Cavalry Maj-Gen William Lumley (2,013 total)	Heavy Brigade Col the Hon George de Grey (761 total)	3rd Dragoons (374); 4th Dragoons (387)
Cavalry Maj-Gen William Lumley (2,013 total)	Portuguese Cavalry Brigade Col Loftus William Otway (849 total)	1st Portuguese Dragoons (327); 7th Portuguese Dragoons (314); 5th Portuguese Dragoons (1 sqn, 104); 8th Portuguese Dragoons (1 sqn, 104)
Cavalry Maj-Gen William Lumley (2,013 total)	Unbrigaded (403 total)	13th Light Dragoons (403)
Artillery Maj Alexander Dickson (32 guns, 768 men total)	British batteries (8 guns, 225 men)	Lefebvre's Troop, RHA (4 × 9 pdr); Hawker's Battery, RA (4 × 9 pdr)
Artillery Maj Alexander Dickson (32 guns, 768 men total)	KGL Batteries (12 guns, 292 men)	Cleeve's Battery, KGA (5 × 6 pdr, 1 × 5.5" howitzer); Sympher's Battery, KGA (5 × 6 pdr, 1 × 5.5" howitzer)
Artillery Maj Alexander Dickson (32 guns, 768 men total)	Portuguese batteries (12 guns, 221 men)	Braun's Portuguese Battery (6 × 9 pdr); Arriaga's Portuguese Battery (6 × 9 pdr)
Total Anglo-Portuguese Forces: 20,650 (17,869 infantry, 2,013 cavalry, 768 artillery, 32 guns)
Sources: Unless specified, numbers taken from Oman (1911, Appendix XV).

=== Spanish Forces ===
Commander-in-Chief of the Spanish Forces: Gen Joaquín Blake y Joyes

==== 4th Army ====
Commander-in-Chief: Gen Joaquín Blake y Joyes

Division	Brigade	Regiments and Others
Vanguard Division Gen José de Lardizábal (2,398 total)	1st Brigade Brig-Gen Casinos	1st Murcia; 2nd Murcia; Fijo Milicia Provincial de Canarias
Vanguard Division Gen José de Lardizábal (2,398 total)	2nd Brigade Brig-Gen Gouvea-Casinos	2/2nd León; Campo Mayor; Cazadores Reunidos
3rd Division Gen Francisco Ballesteros (3,525 total)	1st Brigade Brig-Gen Gouvea-Asensio	Provincial Compañias de Catalanes; 2nd Cazadores de Barbastro; Pravia
3rd Division Gen Francisco Ballesteros (3,525 total)	2nd Brigade Brig-Gen Carvajal	Lena; Castropol; Cangas de Tineo; Infiesto
4th Division Gen José Zayas (4,882 total)	1st Brigade Brig-Gen Cruz-Murgeon	2nd Reales Guardias de España; 4th Reales Guardias de España; 2nd Irlanda; 3rd Irlanda; Patria
4th Division Gen José Zayas (4,882 total)	2nd Brigade Brig-Gen Polo	Imperiales de Toledo; Legión de Estranjeros; Ciudad Rodrigo; 1st Reales Guardias Walonas
Cavalry (1,165 total)	4th Army Cavalry Brigade Brig-Gen Loy	Granaderos de Fernando VII; Granaderos a Caballo; Escuadron Provincial de Instrucción; Provisional de Santiago; Husares de Castilla
Artillery	4th Army 5th Army	1 battery, 8 guns 1 battery, 6 guns

==== 5th Army ====
Commander-in-Chief: Gen Francisco Castaños

Division	Brigade	Regiments and Others
Infantry (2,398 total)	Carlos de España's Brigade Gen Carlos de España	Immemorial de Rey; 1st Zamora; 2nd Zamora; Voluntarios de Navarra
Cavalry (721 total)	5th Army Cavalry Brigade Brig-Gen Penne-Villemur	Reales Carabineros de la Guardia; La Reina; Borbón; Lusitania; 2nd Algarve; Husares de Estremadura; Cazadores de Sevilla
Artillery (62 total)		Miranda's Battery (6 × 4 pdr)
Total Spanish Forces: 14,531 (12,583 infantry, 1,886 cavalry, 62 artillery, 6 guns)
Sources: Unless specified, numbers taken from Oman (1911, Appendix XV).

== French Armée du Midi (Army of the South) ==
Commander-in-Chief: Marshal Jean-de-Dieu Soult

=== V Corps d'Armée ===
GD Jean-Baptiste Girard

Division	Brigade	Regiments and Others
1st Division GD Jean-Baptiste Girard (4,253 total)	1st Brigade GB Michel Veilande (1,852 total)	34th Ligne (2 bns, 953); 88th Ligne (2 bns, 899)
1st Division GD Jean-Baptiste Girard (4,253 total)	2nd Brigade GB Pepin (2,401 total)	40th Ligne (2 bns, 812); 64th Ligne (3 bns, 1,589)
2nd Division GD Honoré Gazan (4,183 total)	1st Brigade GB Jean-Pierre Maransin (1,526 total)	21st Légère (2 bns, 788); 100th Ligne (2 bns, 738)
2nd Division GD Honoré Gazan (4,183 total)	2nd Brigade GB Sylvestre-Brayer (2,657 total)	28th Légère (3 bns, 1,367); 103rd Ligne (3 bns, 1,290)
Independent Brigades (10,578 total)	Werlé's Brigade GB François Werlé (5,621 total)	12th Légère (3 bns, 2,164); 55th Ligne (3 bns, 1,815); 58th Ligne (3 bns, 1,642)
Independent Brigades (10,578 total)	Godinot's Brigade GB Nicolas Godinot (3,924 total)	16th Légère (3 bns, 1,673); 51st Ligne (3 bns, 2,251)
Independent Brigades (10,578 total)	Grenadiers Réunis (1,033 total)	Grenadier companies of: 45th Ligne; 63rd Ligne; 95th Ligne; 4th Vistula
Cavalry Division GD Latour-Maubourg (4,012 total)	1st Brigade GB André Briche (823 total)	2nd Hussars (305); 10th Hussars (262); 21st Chasseurs à Cheval (256)
Cavalry Division GD Latour-Maubourg (4,012 total)	2nd Brigade GB André François Bron (1,093 total)	4th Dragoons (406); 20th Dragoons (266); 26th Dragoons (421)
Cavalry Division GD Latour-Maubourg (4,012 total)	3rd Brigade GB Joseph Bouvier des Éclaz (879 total)	14th Dragoons (316); 17th Dragoons (314); 27th Dragoons (249)
Cavalry Division GD Latour-Maubourg (4,012 total)	Unbrigaded (1,217 total)	1st Vistulan Lancers (Uhlans) (591); 27th Chasseurs à Cheval (431); 4th Spanish Chasseurs à Cheval (195)
Artillery Charles-Étienne-François Ruty (48 guns, 1,243 men total)		3rd Horse Artillery (2 batteries, 12 × 6 pdr); 5th Horse Artillery (3 batteries, 18 × 6 pdr); 6th Foot Artillery (3 batteries, 18 × 8 pdr)
Total French Forces: 24,269 (19,014 infantry, 4,012 cavalry, 1,243 artillery, 48 guns)
Sources: Unless specified, numbers taken from Oman (1911, Appendix XVI).
