= Patriot War =

1837–38 raids by U.S.-based militias to assist Upper Canadian rebels

- Part of the Upper Canada Rebellion and the Rebellions of 1837–1838
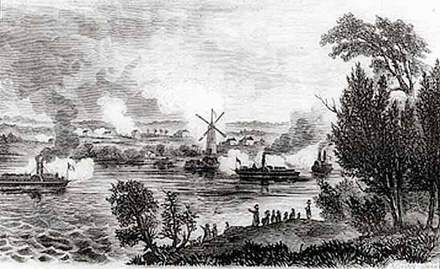
- Battle of the Windmill, Prescott
| Date | January 8, 1838 – December 4, 1838 (10 months, 3 weeks and 5 days) |
| Location | Great Lakes Basin |
| Result | Anglo-American victory: Defeat of Hunters' Lodges; Navy Island retaken; Republic of Upper Canada collapses; Unification of Upper and Lower Canada into the Province of Canada and democratic reforms to lessen social unrest |

Belligerents
| British Empire: Upper Canada; United States | Republic of Upper Canada; Hunters' Lodge; Patriotes (Note: During the Upper Canada Rebellion, the Patriotes only fought at the Battle of Pelee Island, at which they were defeated.) |

Commanders and leaders
| (United Kingdom of Great Britain and Ireland) Henry Dundas (United Kingdom of Great Britain and Ireland) George Brown (United Kingdom of Great Britain and Ireland) Richard Airey (United Kingdom of Great Britain and Ireland) Robert Baillie (United Kingdom of Great Britain and Ireland) James Magrath (Upper Canada) Allan MacNab (Upper Canada) William Jarvis (Upper Canada) John Prince (Upper Canada) Richard Fraser (Upper Canada) Ogle Gowan (Upper Canada) John Crysler (Upper Canada) John Sparks (United States) Hugh Brady (United States) Stevens Mason | Robert Nelson; Cyrille Côté; Charles Duncombe; William Mackenzie; Nils Schoultz (executed); Donald McLeod †; Lucius Bierce; Samuel Chandler; Alexander McLeod; James Morreau; Lester Hoadley † |

Casualties and losses
| Total: 146; 29 killed 103 wounded 13 captured 1 steamship sunk | Republic of Canada: Entire force captured Hunters' Lodge: 92 killed 81 wounded 222–243 captured Patriotes: 14 killed 18 wounded 11 captured |

The Patriot War was a conflict along the Canada–United States border in which bands of raiders attacked the British colony of Upper Canada more than a dozen times between December 1837 and December 1838. It was not a conflict between nations; it was a war of ideas fought by like-minded people against British forces, with the British and US governments eventually allying against the Patriots.

Participants in the conflict were members of a secret association known as the Hunter's Lodge, formed in the United States in sympathy with the 1837 Rebellions in Upper and Lower Canada. The organization arose in Vermont among Lower Canadian refugees (the eastern division or Frères chasseurs) and spread westward under the influence of Dr. Charles Duncombe and Donald McLeod, leaders of the short-lived Canadian Refugee Relief Association, and Scotland native William Lyon Mackenzie, drawing support from several different locations in North America and Europe. The Republic of Canada was also short-lived. After a heavy bombardment by the British on Navy Island, where the republic had been established, Mackenzie and his force of Canadian para-military fighters retreated to Buffalo, New York, where they were captured by the U.S. Army.

On charges of violating the neutrality between the United States and the British Empire, they were sentenced to 18 months imprisonment. This brought to an end what the British viewed as an inconsequential and unsupported colonial rebellion. The organizations were made up of grass-roots armed militants whose goal was to overthrow British rule in Canada. Their dispersal involved the largest deployment of U.S. troops against their own citizens since the Whiskey Rebellion of 1794.

== Background ==
During the Upper Canada Rebellion American sympathisers were organising meetings along the Canada-American border. One meeting in Buffalo, New York met on December 5, 1837 and appointed a committee of 13 to organize support for the rebels. The rebellion in Upper Canada ended with the Battle of Montgomery's Tavern. Mackenzie and many other rebels fled to the United States to escape arrest by British forces.

William Lyon Mackenzie spoke at a meeting in Buffalo that caused Thomas Jefferson Sutherland to commit to an invasion of Upper Canada to bring about its independence from Britain. Other audience members committed to arranging resources and equipment for the planned invasion.

== Navy Island Invasion and Republic of Canada ==
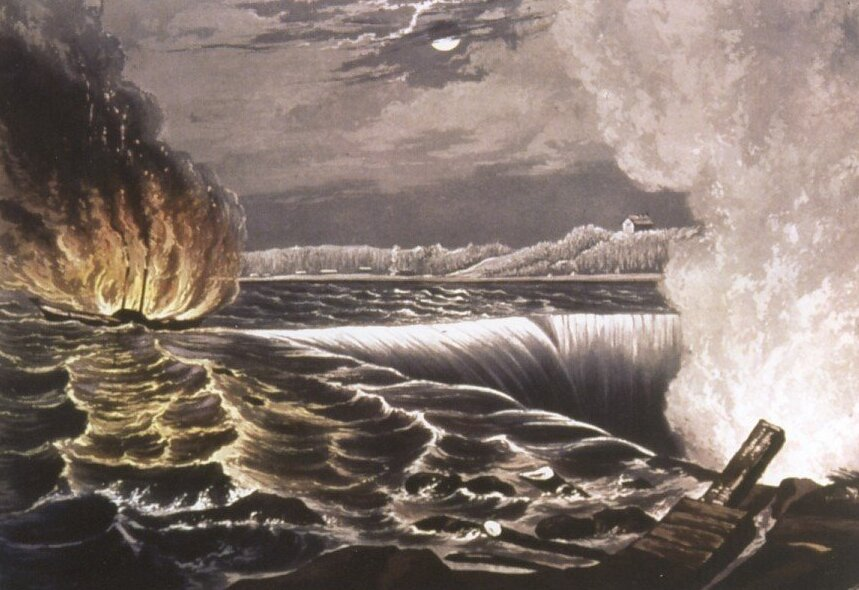
The Destruction of the Caroline by George Tattersall

On December 14, 1837, Mackenzie, Rensselaer van Rensselaer and 24 rebels made a foray into Upper Canada, by traveling by boat to Navy Island. The plan was to launch an attack in support of an uprising led by Duncombe in the London district. Mackenzie on Navy Island declared the provisional government of the Republic of Canada and offered three hundred acres (120 ha) of government land to each volunteer.

During the month of December, large supportive meetings were held in towns in northern U.S., including Burlington, Albany, Rochester, Buffalo, Cleveland and Detroit and aid was promised. By the end of the month, around 500 volunteers had joined Mackenzie on Navy Island, ferried by the Caroline. Allan MacNab and Andrew Drew of the Royal Navy crossed the international boundary and seized Caroline, chased off the crew, set her afire, and cast her adrift over Niagara Falls after killing a Black American named Amos Durfee.

In January 1838 a United States commandant outbid a Buffalo committee who was supplying resources to Navy Island, hampering their efforts. With the failure of Duncombe's revolt, the main purpose of seizing Navy Island disappeared and it was evacuated on January 14, 1838, ending the short-lived republic. Van Rensselaer was arrested for violating the Neutrality Act when he returned to the mainland.

== Incidents ==
=== Schooner Anne and Bois Blanc Island (January 8, 1838) ===
Thomas Jefferson Sutherland was sent by the rebellion leaders on Navy Island in the Niagara River to raise a force in Detroit in December 1837. Sutherland arrived to find that Henry S. Handy and Dr. Edward A. Theller had already held public meetings and organized an invasion force. Handy was in Toronto in the fall of 1837 where he met Marshall Bidwell and learned of the rebellion from him. Handy and his brother-in-law Judge Orange Butler, then of the Michigan House of Representatives, joined G. M. Dufort of Montreal in travelling to Detroit where they formed a "war council" of influential citizens. Men came to Detroit from as far away as Illinois and Kentucky to join the movement. On January 5, 1838, the Detroit jail was raided and the Patriots seized the 450 muskets which had been stored there. The Patriots were reported to have stolen another 200 weapons from the unsecured office of the U.S. marshal in Detroit, perhaps with his help. James M. Wilson was appointed major-general; Elijah Jackson Roberts as brigadier-general of the first brigade; Dr. Edward Alexander Theller as brigadier-general of the first brigade of Irish and French troops to be raised. Sutherland and General E. J. Roberts disagreed over who would lead the invasion force on the Schooner Anne against Fort Malden, Amherstburg, Upper Canada. Handy appointed Theller was to command the schooner Anne, while Sutherland would lead a flotilla to Bois Blanc Island opposite Amherstburg on the understanding he was under Roberts' command. But for some reason Sutherland stopped in American territory on Sugar Island, a little further out, instead. Anne attacked Fort Malden on January 9, but was beached and Theller taken prisoner and ultimately jailed in the citadel in Quebec City. Further attempts to attack Fort Malden were stymied by American troops. Michigan Governor Stevens T. Mason helped by leading a militia force to thwart the Patriots fighting in the Battle of Windsor.

=== Fighting Island (February 24, 1838) and Hickory Island (February 22, 1838) ===
A series of simultaneous attacks set for Washington's birthday (February 22) were next planned. On February 23 the steamboat Erie headed for Fighting Island, seven miles (11 km) south of Detroit, carrying more than 400 troops from Cleveland under General Donald McLeod. They were poorly equipped as their arms were captured by the American authorities. The British troops crossed the ice and dispersed the Patriots on February 25. The British military announced their intention to pursue the Patriots into the United States but U.S. troops put a line of red flags on the ice in the river marking the border and were under orders to shoot any British troops that crossed it. The British did not cross the line and the U.S. captured some Patriots but soon released them.

On February 22, General van Rensselaer and Daniel Heustis travelled to Hickory Island with less than 100 men to prevent arms from being seized under the Neutrality Act of 1794. They hoped that over 1000 men would follow and they would be able to capture Kingston, but the troops never arrived and the plan was abandoned.

=== Battle of Pelee Island (March 3, 1838) ===
Most of the men from the earlier expeditions now collected at Sandusky Bay, Ohio, and under the leadership of Captain George van Rensselaer (a relative of the General) and General Thomas Jefferson Sutherland, took Pelee Island in Lake Erie. However, their expected arms were again captured by the US authorities, leaving them with only 200 guns for all the men. They were attacked by the British and Van Rensselaer, along with 10 of his troops, were killed, with numerous others captured; 5 British soldiers were killed. The retreating Patriots were forced to surrender their arms by the US authorities and disbanded.

At the end of this period, William Lyon Mackenzie was at odds with other Patriot leaders and soon was arrested for breach of the American Neutrality Laws. Thomas Jefferson Sutherland was captured by the British near Detroit and taken to jail in Toronto, where he was witness to the hanging of Samuel Lount, an organizer of the attack on Toronto.

=== Canadian Refugee Relief Association ===
In March 1838, a committee consisting of General Donald McLeod, William Lyon Mackenzie, Dr. Charles Duncombe, Dr. Alexander Mackenzie and a number of other Canadian refugees met at Lockport to form the "Canadian Refugee Relief Association." Dr. A. Mackenzie became the president, and General Donald McLeod the general organizer. This organization was loosely connected with the attack on the steamer Sir Robert Peel and the Short Hill raid. McLeod went on, with Duncombe, to form the Hunter's Lodges soon thereafter.

=== Burning of Sir Robert Peel (May 29, 1838) ===
On May 29, 1838 a band of Patriots disguised as Aboriginals attacked the steamer Sir Robert Peel at Well's Island and burned it. The expedition was under the command of General Donald McLeod and William Johnston.

=== Short Hills Raid (June 21–23, 1838) ===
Twenty four men, largely Canadian, under the leadership of Colonel James Morreau assembled at Clark's Point near Lewiston, New York, on June 11, 1838 and crossed over the Niagara River. They hoped to provoke a general uprising of sympathizers in the Niagara area. They attacked troops stationed at a tavern in Short Hills on June 20. The Patriots were captured, including Morreau, Major Benjamin Wait, and Donald McLeod.

=== Henry S. Handy's "Secret Order of the Sons of Liberty" ===
Henry S. Handy (1804–1846) was a lawyer, newspaper editor and military engineer. He was appointed to oversee the construction of the Chicago Harbour in 1833 by the United States Army Corps of Engineers. After the failure of earlier efforts, in which US authorities had intervened, he organized lodges of the "Secret Order of the Sons of Liberty" along both sides of the Michigan border with Upper Canada. Handy, as "Commander-in-chief of the Patriot Army of the Northwest" planned for a revolutionary army of 20,000 to capture Windsor on the 4th of July. The organization soon merged into the Hunters' Lodges.

=== Formation of the Hunters' Lodge ===
The first Hunters' Lodge (Frères chasseurs) was formed in north Vermont by Dr. Robert Nelson early in the spring of 1838 and spread rapidly within Quebec. Early in the summer, Donald McLeod, a rebel Upper Canadian schoolmaster, and newspaper editor, was initiated in the "Brother Hunters" and informed them of the existence of Henry S. Handy's "Secret Order of the Sons of Liberty". They were distinct, yet again, from a third organization forming in Cleveland under Dr. Charles Duncombe, who were planning an invasion of Upper Canada for the 4th of July. Under McLeod's influence, the Cleveland group adopted the form of the Hunters' Lodge. The Sons of Liberty disappeared after their failed raid on Windsor, and were absorbed into the Hunters' Lodge.

==== Lodge organization ====
The Hunters Lodges were modelled on Masonic lodges, and adopted similar secret signs, hierarchical orders, and rituals. The Grand Lodge was at Cleveland, where Duncombe was a tireless promoter. The four degrees of the Lodge were: Snowshoe, Beaver, Grand Hunter and Patriot Hunter. Soldiers without rank were of the first degree, commissioned officers of the second, field officers of the third, and the highest ranking commissioned officers of the fourth degree.

==== Convention and military organization ====
In September 1838, 160 delegates from the western Hunters' Lodges attended a secret, week-long "Patriot Congress" in Cleveland, Ohio. They appointed a provisional Canadian republican government that included:

1. President A.D. Smith, "chief justice of the peace at Cleveland"
2. Vice-President Colonel Nathan Williams, "a wholesale grocer" in Cleveland
3. Secretary of the Treasury Judge John Grant Jr, Oswego
4. Secretary of War Donald McLeod
5. Commander-in-chief of the "Patriot Army of the West," Lucius V. Bierce, "an attorney at Akron."
6. Commodore of the Patriot Navy on Lake Erie, Gilman Appleby, former captain of Caroline
7. Commodore of the Patriot Navy on Lake Ontario, Bill Johnston

=== Battle of the Windmill (November 13–18, 1838) ===
The Hunters Lodges in both the Eastern and Western Divisions agreed that they would launch a general invasion of the Canadas on November 1. The Eastern division began their attack on Quebec on November 3 under the direction of Grand Lodges in Montreal and St. Albans, Vermont. The Western division, under the general command of the "vice-president of the provisional government" of the Republic of Canada, Col. Nathan Williams of Cleveland, planned an attack at Detroit.

However, "Major General" John Ward Birge convinced the eastern New York lodges to join him in an attack at Prescott, on the St Lawrence River instead. The leader of the attack was to be Nils Szoltevsky Von Schoultz, a Finnish-Swedish soldier who had been part of the Polish Rebellion. On November 11, four hundred men boarded the steamboat United States at Sackets Harbor, New York. Disagreements arose between Birge and Von Schoultz on the plan of attack, and Birge withdrew with 200 men to Ogdensburg for reinforcements that were never to appear. Von Schoultz and 150 men aboard Charlotte of Toronto reached Windmill Point near Prescott on November 12 where they set up camp. All supplies to Windmill Point were cut off by British and American troops and the Canadian Hunters who had come in support were forced to withdraw.

The standoff that resulted ended November 16 when artillery was brought from Kingston. 137 prisoners were taken, and 80 were killed. The Patriot prisoners were defended by John A. Macdonald, a lawyer in Kingston who was to become Canada's first prime minister.

=== Battle of Windsor (December 4, 1838) ===
The final planned Hunter attack was the western assault, organized out of Cleveland, on Windsor, which had as its intention U.S. invaders driving inland to London, Upper Canada. A diversionary attack from Port Huron on Sarnia was also planned but it was aborted when a large contingent of British troops was deployed on its attack route.

Five or six hundred men established a camp at Brest, 30 miles (48 km) south of Detroit. Lucius V. Bierce, in command of the camp, however contended there were not enough men for a successful attack. E. J. Roberts, an early Detroit organizer with Handy, pushed for the attack anyway. On December 3, the militants seized the steamboat Champlain, and the 135 men aboard landed three miles (4.8 km) north of Windsor at 2 am the next morning. Three detachments sortied under Cornelius Cunningham, William Putnam, and S. S. Coffinbury:

Moving toward the village of Windsor, the Hunters encountered resistance from a detachment of militia stationed in a civilian store used as a guardhouse. Deciding to set fire to it to flush the defenders out, they went to the nearby house of a black Canadian named Mills to get the embers from his hearth fire. The Americans invited Mills to join their cause and, when he not only refused but exclaimed "three cheers for the Queen", they killed him. The guardhouse was destroyed by flames and the occupants taken prisoner, and Putnam's men continued on to Windsor where they set fire to the steamer Thames in retaliation for the destruction of Caroline. On their way they encountered Surgeon John Hume of the 32nd Foot, who, awakened by the alarm bells, was headed to Windsor to offer his services to the local militia. The Hunters killed Hume and mutilated his limbs with an axe before leaving the remains for the local hogs.

The Patriots took positions at the Baby farm, which contained a large orchard. Only 20 militiamen were billeted at Windsor, a small town of around 300, while some miles further south at Sandwich and Amherstburg were the bulk of the 500 militiamen and regulars.

At about 7 am, a 60-man company of Canadian militia from Sandwich successfully repelled the invasion before the regulars arrived and captured several patriots. The militia pushed the Patriots out of the orchard and pursued them through the town. The Patriots then fled in several directions, some returning to their steamer to free the 18 prisoners they had taken. Colonel John Prince arrived after the rout (9:30 am) and took command. Prince then moved his troops back to Sandwich, fearing another attack there.

At 1:30 pm, a company of British regulars from the 34th (Cumberland) Regiment of Foot with a six-pound cannon and 20 mounted Aboriginals arrived at Sandwich and continued north to Windsor. Prince decided to follow with his 400 militiamen. However, all of the Patriots had made their escape by this time, and only one of them was captured. Prince ordered that four prisoners be immediately shot without having been tried in court. The British cannon fired some shots at Patriots fleeing in stolen canoes, hitting one in the arm. The U.S. steamer Erie under the command of the Detroit militia captured some of the Patriots but soon released them on U.S. soil. Total fatalities in the battle were 8 among the British forces and 25 among the Patriots.

Bierce and Roberts escaped to Detroit, where they were joined by Dr. E. A. Theller, who had escaped imprisonment in Quebec. By December 4 the expected reinforcements arrived at Detroit, but the U.S. government prevented a second attack. At a large public meeting, the Patriot volunteers passed resolutions rebuking the US government for taking arms against its own people. The volunteer army dispersed, ending the Patriot War.

== Webster–Ashburton Treaty ==
The Caroline affair was resolved by US (Daniel Webster) and British (Alexander Baring) diplomats, in the course of their negotiations leading to the Webster–Ashburton Treaty of 1842.

== Aftermath and impact ==
=== Transportation to Australia ===
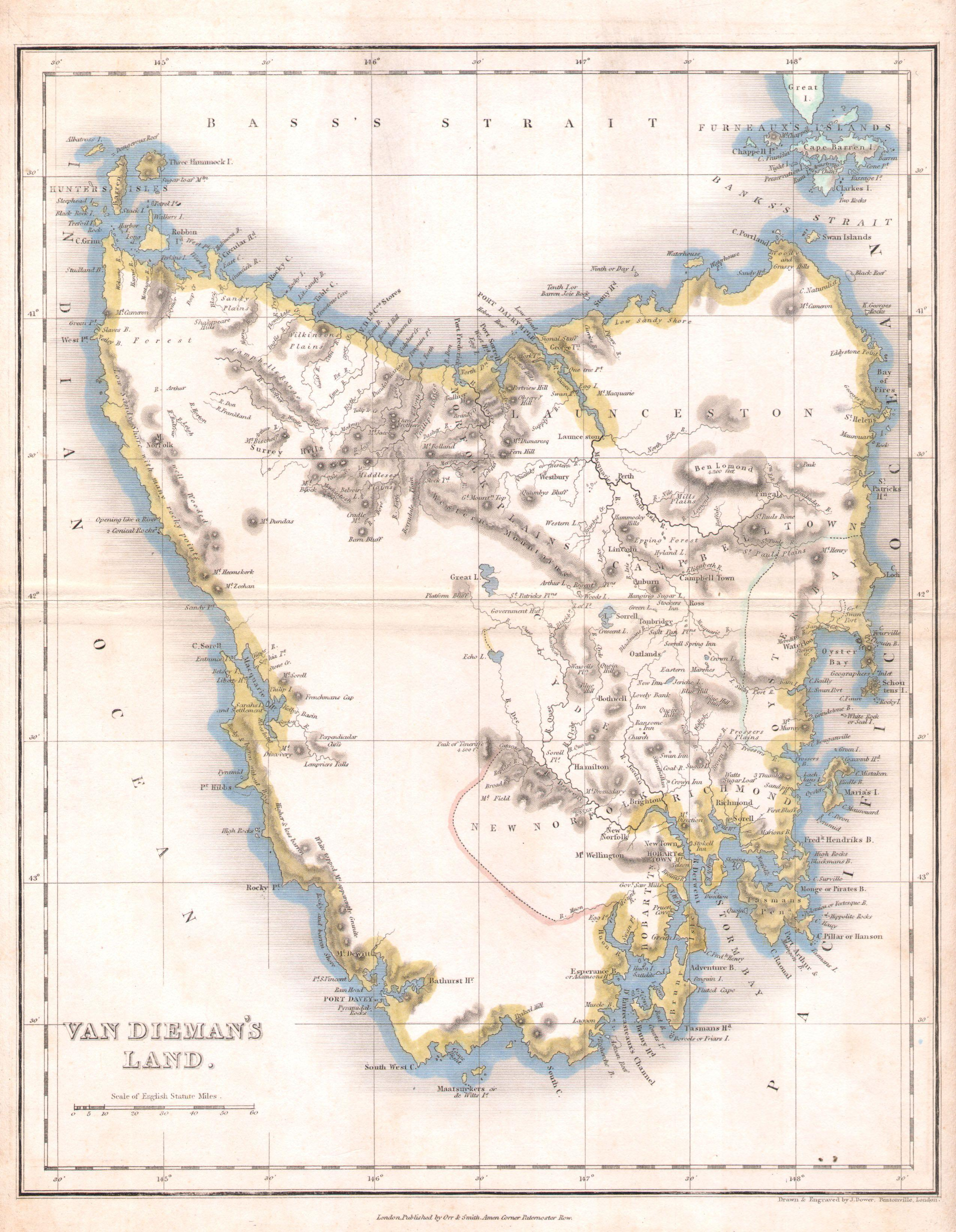
1837 Dower Map of Van Diemen's Land or Tasmania

In total, 93 Americans and 58 Patriot prisoners from Lower Canada were transported to Australia after being convicted in Montreal in late 1838 or early 1839. Almost all were taken on HMS Buffalo, leaving Quebec in September 1839 and arriving off Hobart, Van Diemen's Land, in February 1840. The Americans were disembarked at Hobart but the French-Canadians were taken to Sydney, New South Wales. They were interned near the present day suburb of Concord, giving rise to the names Canada Bay, French Bay and Exile Bay. The Lower Canadians were treated better than the Americans, liberated sooner and assisted in getting home. Of the 93 Americans, 14 died as a direct result of transportation and penal servitude. By the end of 1844, half of those in Van Diemen's Land had been granted pardons, nearly all were pardoned by 1848, but five remained in penal servitude until at least 1850. None of the convicts chose to stay in Van Diemen's Land after being pardoned. Three former convicts, however, did eventually settle in Australia: Ira Polley (Polly), of Lyme, New York, left in 1844 and subsequently married and settled in the Illawarra region of New South Wales; Chauncey Bugby (now Buckby) married Elizabeth Hughes in 1846 and settled in Circular Head section of the northwest corner of Tasmania; and Hiram Sharp(e) of Salina in Onondaga County, New York, left in August 1846, married a Mary Black and settled in Kiama in New South Wales.

=== International relations ===
In geopolitical terms, the Rebellions and the Patriot War altered the landscape of relations between Britain and British colonial authorities, on one hand, and the American government on the other. Both nations were dedicated to a peace policy, due to a budding financial crisis, and to a sense of perceived disadvantage, which both felt equally. Both were legitimately concerned about the disruption in relations which radical ideas might foment through further rebellion and raids (this was a greater worry to the British than to the Americans). An unprecedented level of cooperation occurred in diplomatic and military circles. In the United States, in addition to dialogue, the administration of Martin Van Buren used its military forces and local authorities in the enforcement of a new Neutrality Act, encouraged the prosecution of filibusters, and actively deterred American citizens from subversive activities abroad. Thus the Patriot War contributed to the construction of more recent Anglo-American and Canada-U.S. relations; it also led, more immediately, to a backlash among U.S. citizens regarding the seeming overreach of federal authority.

The extended series of incidents comprising the Patriot War were finally settled by U.S. Secretary of State Daniel Webster and Alexander Baring, 1st Baron Ashburton, in the course of their negotiations leading to the Webster–Ashburton Treaty of 1842. The U.S. Army constructed Fort Wayne in Detroit in 1842 after the conflict to counter the British presence at Fort Malden in Sandwich. The U.S.-Canadian border remained mostly peaceful until the Fenian raids of 1866-1871.

== See also ==
- List of incidents of civil unrest in Canada

== Works cited ==
- Kilbourn, William (2008). The Firebrand: William Lyon Mackenzie and the Rebellion in Upper Canada. Toronto: Dundurn. ISBN 978-1-77-070324-7.
