= Maçon =

Maçon is a surname. Notable people with the surname include:

- Jean-Baptiste Maçon, Canadian merchant and political figure
- Jeremy Maçon, Jersey politician
- Yvann Maçon (born 1998), Guadeloupean footballer

== See also ==
- Le Maçon
- Macon (surname)
