= Nils von Schoultz =

Swedish adventurer hanged in Canada

- Born: Nils Gustaf Ulrik von Schoultz; October 7, 1807; Kuopio, Kingdom of Sweden
- Died: December 8, 1838 (age 31); Fort Henry, Kingston, Upper Canada
- Burial place: St. Mary's Cemetery in Kingston, Ontario, Canada
- Other name: Nils Scholtewskii von Schoultz
- Military career
- Allegiance: Sweden; Poland; France; Hunters' Lodges/Republic of Canada
- Branch: Swedish Armed Forces; Army of Congress Poland; French Army
- Service years: 1825-1829 (Sweden); 1830 (Poland); 1831-1832 (France)
- Rank: Löjtnant
- Units: Royal Svea Artillery Regiment; French Foreign Legion
- Conflicts: Polish-Russian War of 1830-1831: Battle of Warsaw (1831); French conquest of Algeria Rebellions of 1837–1838: Battle of the Windmill

Nils Gustaf Ulrik von Schoultz (October 7, 1807 – December 8, 1838) was a Swedish military officer, chemist, and adventurer of Finland-Swedish origin who led the Battle of the Windmill during the Upper Canada Rebellion in 1838.

== Family and early life ==
Nils von Schoultz was born on October 7, 1807 in the Finnish city of Vaasa, then part of the Kingdom of Sweden. He was the second surviving child of the nobleman, Nils Fredrik von Schoultz, governor of Vaasa, a mid-ranking Swedish government official, and his wife Johanna Henrika Gripenberg. His younger sister was Johanna von Schoultz, who became comparatively famous in her own right as a talented opera singer described as being a “perfect soprano.” She was the first opera singer from Finland to travel internationally around Europe, and famed Italian composers like Gioachino Rossini, Gaetano Donizetti, and Vincenzo Bellini all composed pieces with her voice in mind.

Only a few months after his birth, in February 1808, the Finnish War broke out between the Kingdom of Sweden and the Russian Empire, which was an ally of First French Empire. Although Nils Fredrik von Schoultz stayed behind to take up arms as an officer in the war, the family fled to Stockholm for the time being. The war ended with Sweden losing Finland to Russia in September 1809 under the Treaty of Fredrikshamn. The family remained in Stockholm and was soon after reunited with Nils Fredrik von Schoultz, who died seven years later in 1816, when his son Nils was only eight years old.

== Military career ==
Following the footsteps of his father and grandfather, and in alignment with the expectations of young gentlemen in the early 19th-century, von Schoultz enlisted in the military, and passed his artillery officer's examination in May 1829. He excelled academically, especially with mathematics and sciences. Given his charming personality and his handsome appearance, he also frequented balls and other events of the high society of Stockholm at that time. By October 1830, however, at the age of 23, von Schoultz requested permission to resign his commission, and he was granted an honourable discharge. Rumours exist that this was perhaps due to serious gambling debts which von Schoultz had acquired. Regardless, he soon found himself in Poland, and on the side of the rebelling force which was engaged in a bloody insurrection against the Russian Empire. Little is known about von Schoultz's time in Poland, but by his account he partook in the defence of Warsaw and was there when the city fell to the Imperial Russian forces on September 8, 1831, from which he was captured, but he managed to escape captivity soon afterward.

By some way or another, von Schoultz made his way to France and enlisted with the newly established French Foreign Legion. As France had just begun its takeover of Algeria in 1830, von Schoultz was sent across the Mediterranean and participated in the ongoing conquest. By his account, von Schoultz claimed to have had some terrible experiences there and found himself to be disgusted with what was occurring. By the springtime of 1832, however, and again by some way or another, von Schoultz managed to leave the ranks of the French Foreign Legion, and he made his way to Florence, where he happily reunited with his mother and sister.

In 1836, von Schoultz travelled to London and then left England for the United States, where he was engaged in various commercial attempts.

== Invasion of Upper Canada ==
In 1837, von Schoultz began to be interested in the rebellions in Upper Canada and Lower Canada. He became involved with the Hunters' Lodges, secret societies which had the aim of overthrowing British rule in Upper Canada. He came to adopt the view that white Canadians were subject to colonial oppression, similar to his views on Poles living under Russian control. In 1838, von Schoultz was recruited by John Ward Birge to take part in an attack against Prescott in Upper Canada, as part of the Patriot War. Birge felt that von Schoultz would be a welcome addition to the campaign because he believed von Schoultz had been an officer in the Polish army for a time and therefore had some experience with leadership and invasion tactics.

On November 11, 1838, Birge, von Schoultz, and roughly 400 members of the Hunters' Lodges left the shores of New York and proceeded down the St. Lawrence River to put their attack plan into motion. Von Schoultz was placed in charge of a schooner called the Charlotte of Toronto, the only original vessel that would reach the Upper Canadian shore. On November 12, von Schoultz and his crew of about one hundred and fifty men landed three kilometres east of Prescott and worked to construct fortifications in the hamlet of Newport. When the men reached one of the main structures in community, the windmill, they elected von Schoultz as their leader. He helped arrange a solid defence, which held up against British, Canadian and American forces for nearly five days, but on November 16, von Schoultz and his men surrendered to the British.

== Trial and death ==
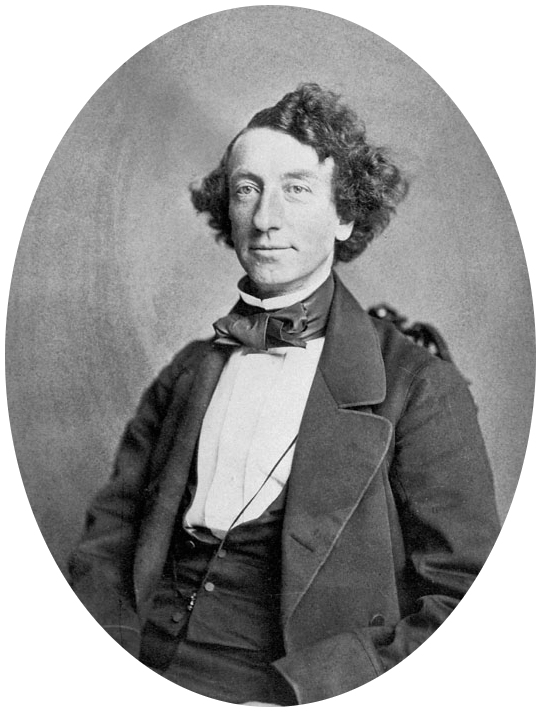
John A. Macdonald, who advised von Schoultz in his defence

The captured invaders were transported to Kingston by boat where they were held at Fort Henry. Von Schoultz and the other prisoners were tried by court martial at the end of November 1838. Von Schoultz was allowed to retain a legal adviser and employed a young John A. Macdonald, the future prime minister of Canada, but the rules of the court required von Schoultz to conduct his own defence. The court martial was presided over by John B. Marks, a militia officer and member of the Legislative Assembly for the neighbouring county of Frontenac. Another member of the court martial was John Solomon Cartwright, also a member of the Legislative Assembly, as well as lawyer and militia officer. William Henry Draper, the Solicitor General for Upper Canada and future premier of the Province of Canada, acted as the Judge Advocate.

Von Schoultz maintained that he had misunderstood the desires of the Canadian people and had been misinformed about their situation. Although Macdonald advised against it, von Schoultz told the court that he felt as if he had to pay for his crimes. He was the only one of the captives who actually pleaded guilty to his violations of law. He also placed some of the blame of his defeat at Prescott on Birge, who had not done anything to help von Schoultz, and his men and had also not sent any reinforcements to the town.

The court martial convicted Von Schoultz and sentenced him to death. His demeanour throughout the trial made him appear to be a respectable man who was filled with regret over what he had done. He won over many of the people he came in contact with during the course of the trial, and some of them even attempted to get Sir George Arthur, the lieutenant-governor of Upper Canada, to spare his life.

Nevertheless, von Schoultz was hanged at Fort Henry on December 8, 1838, aged 31.
