= Essex (Province of Canada electoral district) =

Province of Canada electoral district

Coordinates: 42°10′N 82°47′W

Essex Canada West
Province of Canada electoral district

Defunct pre-Confederation electoral district
- Legislature: Legislative Assembly of the Province of Canada
- District created: 1841
- District abolished: 1867
- First contested: 1841
- Last contested: 1863

Essex was an electoral district of the Legislative Assembly of the Parliament of the Province of Canada, in Canada West, at the south-western tip of the Ontario Peninsula. It was created in 1841, upon the establishment of the Province of Canada by the union of Upper Canada and Lower Canada. Essex was represented by one member in the Legislative Assembly. It was abolished in 1867, upon the creation of Canada and the province of Ontario.

== Boundaries ==
Essex electoral district was located at the southwestern tip of the Ontario Peninsula. It was based on the boundaries of Essex County, in Canada West (now the province of Ontario).

The Union Act, 1840 had merged the two provinces of Upper Canada and Lower Canada into the Province of Canada, with a single Parliament. The separate parliaments of Lower Canada and Upper Canada were abolished. The Union Act provided that the pre-existing electoral boundaries of Upper Canada would continue to be used in the new Parliament, unless altered by the Union Act itself.

Essex County had been an electoral district in the Legislative Assembly of Upper Canada, and its boundaries were not altered by the Act. Those boundaries had originally been set by a proclamation of the first Lieutenant Governor of Upper Canada, John Graves Simcoe, in 1792:

That the eighteenth of the said counties be hereafter called by the name of the county of Essex; which county is to be bounded on the east by the county of Suffolk, on the south by lake Erie, on the west by the river Detroit to Maisonville's mill, from thence by a line running parallel to the river Detroit and lake St. Clair, at the distance of four miles, until it meets the river La Tranche or Thames, thence up the said river to the northwest boundary of the county of Suffolk.

The boundaries had been further defined by a statute of Upper Canada in 1798:

That the townships of Rochester, Mersea, Gosfield, Maidstone, Sandwich, Colchester, Malden, and the tracts of land occupied by the Huron and other Indians upon the Strait, together with such of the Islands as are in Lakes Erie, Sinclair or the Straits, do constitute and form the County of Essex.

Since Essex electoral district was not changed by the Union Act, those boundaries continued to be used for the new electoral district. Essex was represented by one member in the Legislative Assembly.

== Members of the Legislative Assembly ==
Essex was represented by one member in the Legislative Assembly. The following were the members for Essex:

Parliament	Years	Member	Party
1st Parliament	1841–1844	John Prince, QC	Unionist; Independent Reformer
2nd Parliament	1844–1847	John Prince, QC	Unionist; Independent Reformer
3rd Parliament	1848–1851	John Prince, QC	Unionist; Independent Reformer
4th Parliament	1851–1854	John Prince, QC	Unionist; Independent Reformer
5th Parliament	1854–1857	Arthur Rankin	Conservative
6th Parliament	1858–1861	John McLeod	Conservative
7th Parliament	1861–1863	Arthur Rankin	Conservative
8th Parliament	1863–1867	Arthur Rankin	Conservative

== Abolition ==
The district was abolished on July 1, 1867, when the British North America Act, 1867 came into force, creating Canada and splitting the Province of Canada into Quebec and Ontario. It was succeeded by electoral districts of the same name in the House of Commons of Canada and the Legislative Assembly of Ontario.
