= Robert Lucas, 3rd Baron Lucas of Shenfield =

English nobleman and army officer

Arms of Lucas of Little Saxham, Suffolk and Shenfield, Essex: Argent, a fess between six annulets gules

Robert Lucas, 3rd Baron Lucas (c. 1649 – 31 January 1705) was an English nobleman and army officer.

A supporter of William III during the Glorious Revolution, he was made Constable of the Tower of London by the House of Lords to supersede Lord Dartmouth, an appointment subsequently confirmed by the King. He served in William's Flemish campaigns during the Nine Years' War, becoming lieutenant-colonel of Jacob's Regiment of Foot. Upon the accession of Queen Anne, he was replaced as Constable of the Tower by the Earl of Abingdon and given the colonelcy of a new regiment of foot.

He died on 31 January 1705; the barony of Lucas became extinct with him, while command of his regiment went to Lieutenant-Colonel Hans Hamilton. Richard Steele, then a captain in his regiment, left an epitaph in praise of his character.

== Citations ==
Military offices
New regiment	Lord Lucas's Regiment of Foot; 1702–1705	Succeeded by Hans Hamilton
Honorary titles
Preceded by The Lord Dartmouth	Constable of the Tower of London; Lord-Lieutenant of the Tower Hamlets; 1689–1702	Succeeded by The Earl of Abingdon
Peerage of England
Preceded by Charles Lucas	Baron Lucas; 1688–1705	Extinct
