= S. S. MacDonell =

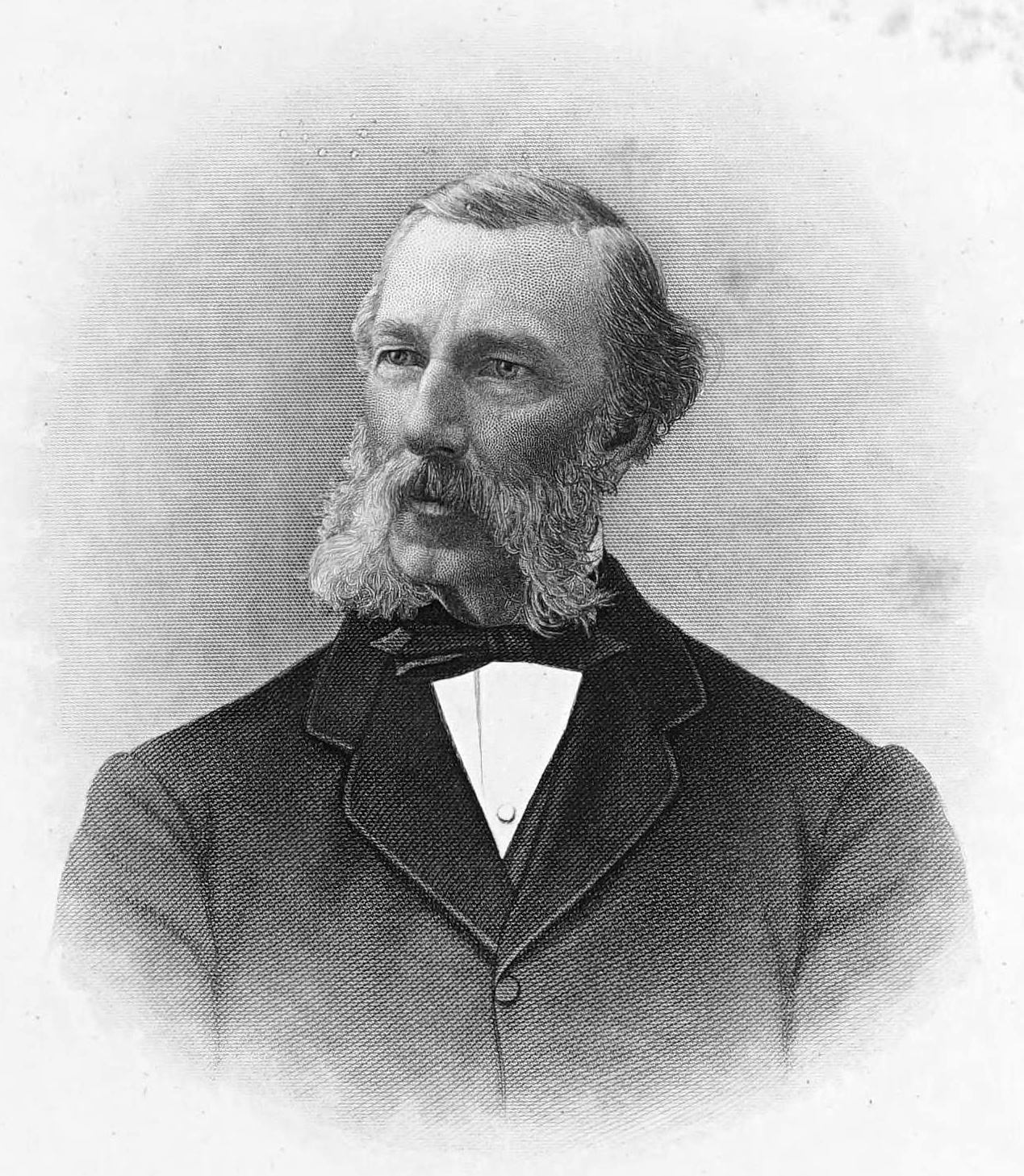
MacDonell in an 1880 engraving

Samuel Smith MacDonell, KC (February 21, 1823 – March 25, 1907) was a lawyer and politician in Ontario, Canada. He served as the first mayor of Windsor in 1858.

== Biography ==
The son of Alexander Macdonell and Ann Smith, he was born in Toronto, Upper Canada and was educated at Upper Canada College and King's College. MacDonell studied law with Henry Sherwood and was called to the bar in 1847. He joined the North York Militia in 1842, later becoming lieutenant-colonel in the Essex Militia. MacDonell entered the practice of law at Amherstburg. He later was named clerk and solicitor for the council for the western district and moved to Sandwich (later part of Windsor). He then became clerk and solicitor for the united counties of Essex, Kent and Lambton. In 1853, he moved to Windsor. When Windsor was incorporated as a village in 1854, MacDonell served as its reeve. He also served as warden for Essex County. When Windsor became a town in 1858, he became its first mayor. In 1881, he was named Queen's Counsel. MacDonell was county crown attorney and clerk of the peace. He also served on the local school board for 20 years.

In 1856, he married Ellen Gillis Brodhead.

In 1891, he moved to Toronto due to health problems. He later died there at the age of 84.

His uncle Samuel Smith had served as administrator for Upper Canada.
