= John Prince (politician) =

Lawyer and political figure in Province of Canada

John Prince, QC

Member of the Legislative Assembly of Upper Canada for Essex
- In office 1836–1840
- Succeeded by: Position abolished

Member of the Legislative Assembly, Province of Canada, for Essex
- In office 1841–1851
- Preceded by: New position

Member of the Legislative Council of the Province of Canada, Western Division
- In office 1857–1860

Judge of the Algoma District Court
- In office 1860–1870

Personal details
- Born: March 12, 1796 Hereford, England (?)
- Died: November 30, 1870 (aged 74) Sault Ste. Marie, Ontario
- Party: Independent
- Spouse: Mary Ann Millington (June 17, 1823)
- Relatives: William Stratton Prince (son)
- Occupation: Land-owner
- Profession: Lawyer, Judge

Military service
- Branch/service: 3rd Essex Militia, Upper Canada
- Rank: Colonel
- Battles/wars: 1837 Rebellion

John Prince, QC (March 12, 1796 – November 30, 1870) was a lawyer, militia officer, gentleman farmer and political figure in Upper Canada and Canada West.

== Early life ==
Prince was born in England in 1796, likely in Hereford. He studied law and was admitted to the bar in 1821. He entered practice in Westerham, Kent and then Cheltenham, Gloucestershire. In 1823 he married Mary Ann Millington, with whom he had several children. In 1833, he moved with his family to Upper Canada, to cut off contact with his ne'er-do-well father.

== Legal and business career ==
The Princes settled in Sandwich (now Windsor) in Upper Canada. In 1835, he was named justice of the peace in the Western District. He was also appointed a commissioner in bankruptcy. He was called to the bar of Upper Canada in 1838. In 1844, he was appointed Queen's Counsel. Prince was involved in the development of railways and mines in the southwest part of the province, being president or major stockholder in several companies, but his legal practice appeared to be the major source of his income through his career.

== The 1838 Patriot War ==
The Upper Canada rebellion broke out late in 1837. In early 1838, there were cross-border raids into Essex county from the American side of the boundary, by groups known as the Hunter Patriots, who wanted to establish American-style republicanism in Upper Canada. The raids into Essex County became known as the Patriot War.

Prince joined the Essex Militia to aid in repelling the raiders. He was involved in the capture of the schooner Anne from the Patriots in January 1838, and in the battles of Fighting Island (February) and Pelee Island (March). He and some companions captured one of the leaders of the Patriots, Jefferson Thomas Sutherland.

The Lieutenant Governor of Upper Canada, Sir George Arthur, considered that Prince acquitted himself well in leading the militia forces under his command. He was appointed the colonel of the 3rd Essex militia. In late November, 1838, when there were rumours of another invasion, Prince was given command of the militia post in Sandwich and was directed to summon all of the local militia. On December 4, 1838, a raiding group of more than 150 men crossed from Detroit to Sandwich. Prince led the militia in dispersing the attack, but also gave the order for execution of anyone who was captured. Five of the captured raiders were summarily shot without trial.

Prince was heavily criticised for his conduct, but enjoyed strong support locally. A year later, a military court exonerated him.

== Political career ==
=== Upper Canada ===
In 1836, Prince was elected to the Legislative Assembly of Upper Canada for Essex. He was very active in his term in the Assembly. Sitting as an independent Reformer, he was successful in getting legislation enacted which was of general benefit to his constituents, including the creation of the Western District bank, land titles regulation, and close season game laws.

=== Province of Canada ===
Following the rebellion in Upper Canada, and the similar rebellion in 1837–1838 in Lower Canada (now Quebec), the British government decided to merge the two provinces into a single province, as recommended by Lord Durham in the Durham Report. The Union Act, 1840, passed by the British Parliament, abolished the two provinces and their separate parliaments, and created the Province of Canada, with a single parliament for the entire province, composed of an elected Legislative Assembly and an appointed Legislative Council.

Despite facing public criticism for the executions of the Hunter Patriots, a duel, a court martial and a debate in Parliament over his actions, Prince was reelected from Essex in 1841, 1844, 1847 and 1851.

He did not participate in the vote on the proposal for the merger of Upper Canada with Lower Canada, as recommended in Lord Durham's Report, but he gave it general support, although he later expressed reservations about some of the provisions of the Union Act, 1840.

In the first session of the new Legislative Assembly, Prince supported Austin Cuvillier as Speaker, because Prince considered him a moderate Reformer, like himself, but also because he thought it important to support a bilingual Speaker, especially since a majority of Prince's constituents were French-Canadians.

Prince was an Independent throughout his time as a member of the Legislative Assembly of the new Province of Canada. In the first few sessions of the first Parliament, Prince was a qualified supporter of the union, and also a supporter of the government of Lord Sydenham, the Governor General. In later sessions of the first Parliament and into the second Parliament, he generally supported the Reform members, who were pressing for responsible government However, towards the end of the second Parliament, in 1847, Prince shifted his support to the Tories and Conservatives, eventually voting against the Rebellion Losses Bill.

In 1857, he was elected to the Legislative Council of the Province of Canada in the Western division. He was active in promoting legislation for the benefit of the Sandwich and Essex area.

Although he had supported the suppression of the rebellion in 1837, Prince was consistent to the theme of independence during his time in the Assembly. In 1850, he argued for the independence of Canada from Britain, while retaining the British connection.

== Algoma District ==
In 1860, he resigned from the Legislative Council to accept an appointment as the first judge in the Algoma District. He moved to Sault Ste. Marie, but his wife and family did not accompany him.

He died there in 1870 and was buried in a solitary grave on an island in the river across from his residence.

== Legacy ==
Towards the end of his life, Prince's thoughts on independence had evolved to the point where he questioned whether he should have defended Canada and the monarchy.

Canadian historian Fred Landon refers to Prince in the 1850s as being a duplicitous politician.

In the 1850s...there was more prejudice [against the African Diaspora] in Chatham, due in part to the attitude of a member for parliament for Essex County, who did not hesitate to declare himself the refugees' friend when an election impended, but blackguarded (disparaged) the race at other times, even on the floor of the Canadian Parliament.

Prince Township on Lake Superior near Sault Ste. Marie was named after John Prince.

One of Prince's sons, William Stratton Prince, became Chief Constable of the Toronto Police Department and the first warden of Toronto Central Prison.
