= Fighting Island =

Canadian island in the Detroit River

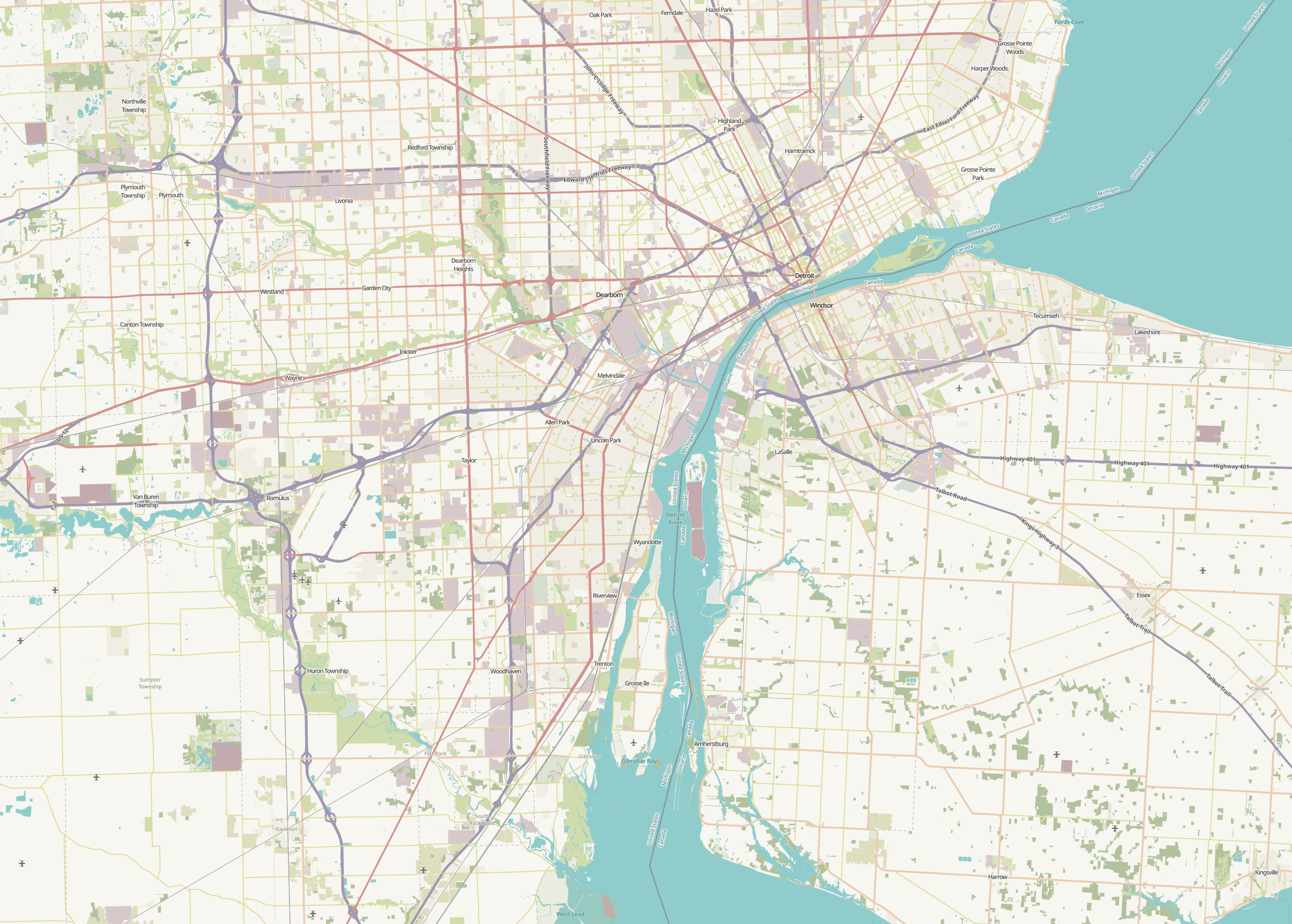
- Location within Wayne County, Michigan Location within Ontario

Geography
- Location: Detroit River
- Coordinates: 42°13′18″N 83°07′12″W
- Area: 6.06 km^{2} (2.34 sq mi)
- Highest elevation: 174 m (571 ft)

Administration
- Canada
- Territory: Ontario
- County: Essex
- City: LaSalle

Fighting Island is a 610-hectare (1,500-acre) island in the Detroit River, and is the largest Canadian island in the river. It is part of the town of LaSalle, Ontario, Canada, opposite Wyandotte, Michigan, and downriver from Detroit and Windsor.

== History ==
Originally populated by indigenous peoples, it was settled by the French during the 18th century, and has had numerous owners since then. The island took its name from the Indigenous artifacts that were first spotted on the island in 1810.

The island was the site of a brief skirmish on February 24 and 25, 1838, during the Battle of Windsor, part of the Patriot War.

In 1918, the land was bought by John B. Ford of the Michigan Alkali Company and was used as a location to deposit waste from their industrial plants which produced soda ash, lye and baking soda. Nearly 15,000,000 m^{3} (20,000,000 yd^{3}) of high-pH waste was dumped on the island during its industrial history. Michigan Alkali Company became Wyandotte Chemicals Corporation, which was subsequently bought by BASF, who are the current owners of the island. BASF embarked on a rehabilitation program which successfully removed the waste for proper disposal, and rebuilt the natural habitat of the island. Since 2004, BASF along with the Greater Essex County District School Board have run a program on the island that is used to teach elementary/secondary schools about biology and ecology.
