= Macon (surname) =

Macon is a surname. It may be derived from French Maçon or Mâcon, meaning "marsh dweller", or a variant of the occupational surname Mason.

People surnamed Macon include:

- Daryl Macon (born 1995), American basketball player for Maccabi Tel Aviv of the Israeli Basketball Premier League
- David Harrison Macon (1870–1952), also known as Uncle Dave Macon, American country musician
- Eddie Macon (1927–2017), American National Football League and Canadian Football League player
- Gideon Macon (c. 1648–1702), early American settler and member of the House of Burgesses of Virginia
- Mark Macon (born 1969), American former basketball player
- Max Macon (1915–1989), American Major League Baseball player and minor league manager
- Nathaniel Macon (1758–1837), American politician
- Robert B. Macon (1859–1925), American politician
- Robert C. Macon (1890–1980), US Army general during World War II
- Valerie Macon (born 1950), American civil servant and eighth North Carolina Poet Laureate

== See also ==
- Le Maçon, a list of people with the surname
- Maçon, a list of people with the surname
