= John Joseph Sims =

Recipient of the Victoria Cross

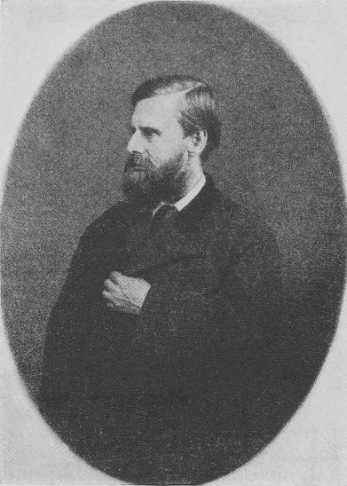
- Born: 1835; Bloomsbury, London, England
- Died: 6 December 1881 (aged 46); Union Workhouse, City of London, England
- Burial place: City of London Cemetery, Manor Park
- Military career
- Allegiance: United Kingdom
- Branch: British Army
- Rank: Private
- Units: 34th Regiment of Foot
- Conflicts: Crimean War
- Awards: Victoria Cross

John Joseph Sims VC (1835 – 6 December 1881) was an English recipient of the Victoria Cross, the highest and most prestigious award for gallantry in the face of the enemy that can be awarded to British and Commonwealth forces.

== Details ==
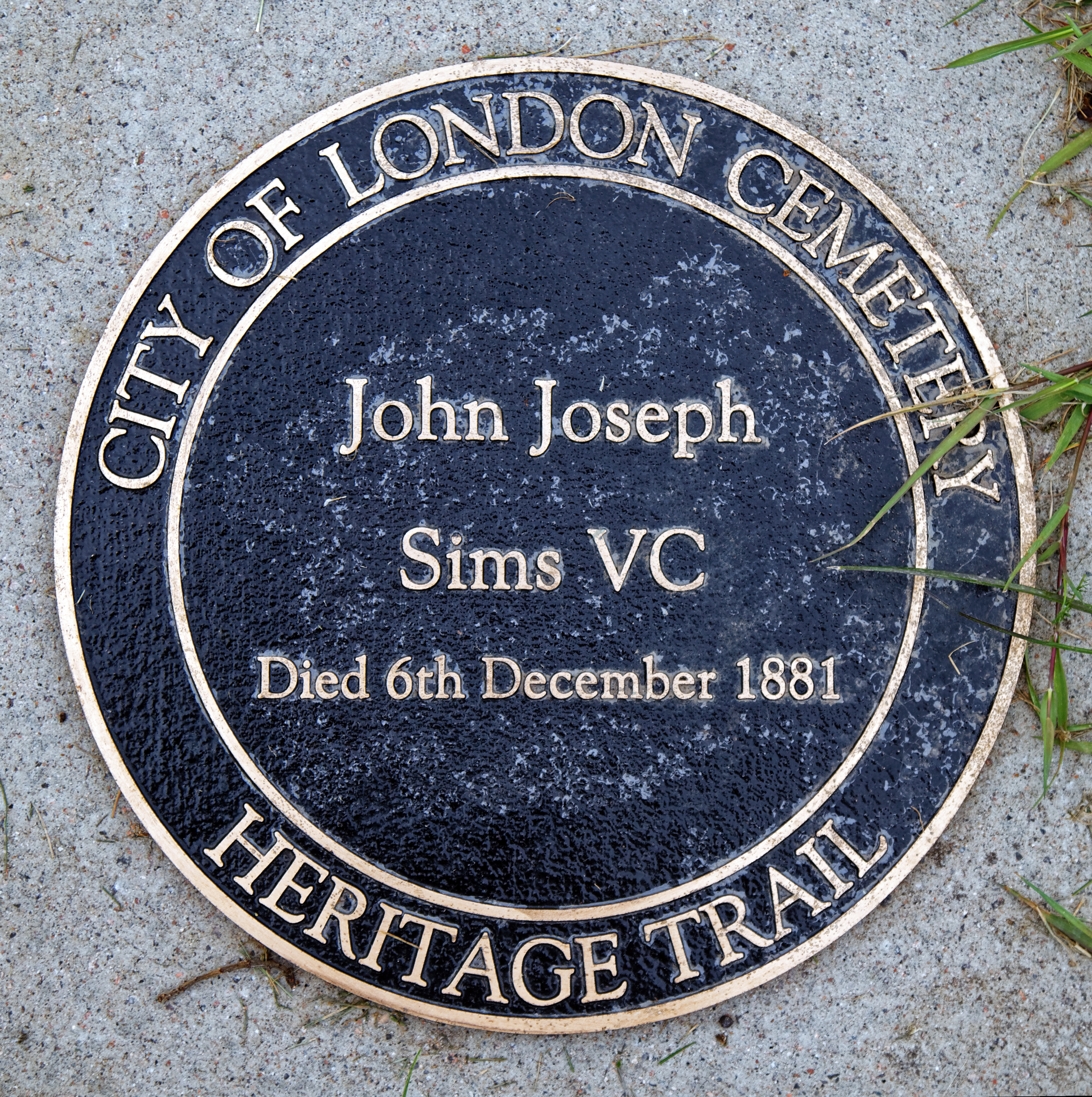
Sims' grave marker, City of London Cemetery

Sims was about 19 years old, and a private in the 34th Regiment of Foot (later the Border Regiment), British Army during the Crimean War when the following deed took place for which he was awarded the VC.

On 18 June 1855 at Sebastopol, Crimea, after the regiment had retired into the trenches from the assault on the Redan, Private Sims went out under very heavy fire in broad daylight and brought in wounded soldiers outside the trenches.

Sims died of tuberculosis in the Union Workhouse, London on 6 December 1881.
