= Richard Pattinson =

Upper Canada politician (1773–1818)

- Born: 1773; Thirteen Colonies
- Died: January 1, 1818 (aged 44–45); Albany, New York, United States
- Occupation: Upper Canada politician
- Known for: Legislative Assembly of Upper Canada (1812–1816)
- Notable work: Essex Militia during the War of 1812
- Spouse: Judith de Joncaire dit Chabert (married 1802-1804) Phillis Elinor Askin (married 1808-1813)

Richard Pattinson (1773 – January 1, 1818) was a merchant lender, investor, entrepreneur, ship owner and, parliamentarian, and the largest mortgagor in Essex in Upper Canada. He represented Essex in the Legislative Assembly of Upper Canada from 1812 to 1816.

Born in the Thirteen Colonies, Pattinson lived in Sandwich, Upper Canada. He was involved in the timber trade. He was a captain in the militia during the War of 1812. Pattinson was a justice of the peace for the Western District. He died in Albany, New York.

== Family ==
First marriage - 24 April 1802 to Judith de Joncaire dit Chabert (1783–1804) at Assumption. Sandwich. They had a daughter, Mary Anne (various spellings) (1803–1836).

The father of Richard Pattinson's first wife was Philip Daniel de Joncaire de Chabert. He was the eldest son of Daniel de Joncaire de Chabert and Margaret Elizabeth Ursula Robert de la Morandiere, and was born at Montreal, 2 December 1752. He served as a Captain of militia in the Revolution. He married Judith Gouin of Detroit, 12 February 1783. He was buried, April 30, 1793. The three children of this union were: Judith, who married Richard Pattinson; Margaret, who married James McGregor; and Felicity, who married Denis Campau. The Chaberts became connected by marriage with several well-known Detroit families.

Second marriage - 17 February 1808 to Ellen Phillis Askin (various spellings) (1788–1813). She was the daughter of John Askin., senior, and Archange Barthe. They had three children:

- Richard (1809–1875): a major in the British Army and served with the 16th (The Queen's) Lancers and the 97th (The Earl of Ulster's) Regiment of Foot. He was with the Turkish Contingent during the Crimean War. He was Lieutenant-Governor of the Island of Heligoland from 1857 to 1863.
- Ellen Phyllis (various spellings) (1811–1861)
- Archange Ann (1813–1814)

== Commerce ==
At his passing in 1818, Pattinson owned 14,869 acres in the Western District. His estate recorded 453 people who owed him money.

Richard Pattinson came to Detroit, from Montreal, in 1793 and engaged in what was regarded as a ruinous course of competition for the fur trade.

On 26 September 1795 - Richard Pattinson and his half-brother Hugh Pattinson were involved with several other Detroit traders including John Askin and John Askin Jr. in an attempted to purchase from the United States 20,000,000 acres of land. This consisted of the lower part of Michigan and the upper parts of Ohio, Indiana and Illinois. The scheme was not ratified and fell through.

On 1 June 1797, he was living in now American occupied Detroit. He signed the document declaring that he wished to remain a British Subject. Not long afterwards, he moved to Sandwich (today's Windsor) the British town on the south side of the Detroit River. He was one of the first settlers in the new settlement of Sandwich.

Richard Pattinson and William Gilkinson of Sandwich were among the stockholders in a bank that was formed in Detroit in 1806. General William Hull, governor of Michigan was also a stockholder. Agustus B. Woodward, the chief justice of Michigan was the bank's president. Congress ruled that its formation was illegal and the bank closed.

He was raising oxen to sell on his property on the Thames River. In July 1809, John Askin, Sr. went to Sandwich to see Pattinson and to purchase an American Ox from him.

== Slaves ==
In October 1807 Richard Pattinson, a British Subject, sued for the return of his property (slaves) that had escaped from Sandwich to Detroit. The slaves were Jane Quinn, a 20-year-old mulatto woman; and Joseph Quinn, an 18-year-old boy.

On 29 October 1807 Richard Pattinson, attempts to recover the refugees from enslavement who have come to the Michigan Territory from Sandwich, Upper Canada. His appearance before the Justice of the Peace of Huron / Detroit district was in vain. Judge Augustus B. Woodward uses his Tucker v. Denison ruling to deny extradition.

== Schooner Ellen ==
Richard Pattinson named his 59-ton schooner after his second wife and their daughter both needed Ellen.

The Ellen competed with the Nancy which was twice its size in the shipping trade of the Great Lakes and War of 1812 service. The crews had fun playing pranks on each other.

In January 1812, Colonel Matthew Elliot reports to Major-General Brock, on ships that might be available for military operations against Detroit. One of these is the Ellen (he mistakenly reports the name as Eleanor), laying at Sandwich Wharf, owned by Richard Pattinson.

In June 1812, the Ellen was commandeered at Amherstburg by the British as a transport. It was commanded by Captain Miller.

On 3 October 1813, in his retreat up the Thames River, before the advancing Americans, Major General Proctor ordered two vessels burned at the mouth of the River, one was the Ellen. On 22 November 1813, Proctor certified this fact and valued the vessel at £500.

Richard Pattinson was the 7th largest claimant for war repartitions, seeking compensation besides for the Ellen, for the loss of pine, cedar, and oak, ballast stone, a house, two large storehouses, a fowl house, a stable, a slaughterhouse and a barn.

== War of 1812 ==
As early as 1807, Richard Pattinson was a captain in the Eighth Infantry. Later he was commissioned as captain in 1812 with a battalion company (foot soldiers) in the 2nd Regiment of Essex Militia. He was present at Detroit (15-16 August 1812) and Frenchtown (18-22 Jan 1813).

Once the war arrived, Richard found himself in the middle of it. On 14 July 1812, an American detachment of 115 soldiers and 20 cavalries commanded by Colonel Duncan McArthur, began a looting raid on the Thames River. That night they camped in the vicinity of the mouth of the river. On the morning of the 15th, they moved up the south bank of the river. At Captain Richard Pattinson's residence, they seize a large amount of flour.

In July 1812, American General Hull's troops looted Captain Pattinson's property in Sandwich valued at eighteen hundred pounds (Halifax currency): horses, flour, timber and pelts.

"Captain Richard Pattinson (2nd Essex) suffered significant losses in 1812. But there was much worse to come. He had cut contracted timber for the British commissary on the islands of Lake Erie. But, as his schooner, Ellen, had been requisitioned for military service, his cut lumber on Big Bass Island fell into American hands as did four of his draft horses and a bateaux on Pelee Island. During the second American occupation, the invaders carried off or destroyed six more of his horses, livestock, most of the stock in his lumber yard, a large scow, two additional bateaux, eight acres of meadow, twelve acres of fencing, plus the merchandise of his Sandwich trading store which included 800 deer skins and 740 raccoon pelts. During the retreat, his schooner, Ellen, was destroyed to prevent her falling into American hands. Pattinson's crushing war time losses exceeded five thousand pounds (Halifax currency). Worse yet, his wife died during the rigours of the retreat."

== Parliamentarian ==
In May 1812, William McCormick was elected to the Legislative Assembly of Upper Canada for Essex County. He was a militia officer during the war of 1812 and was made a prisoner near the end of 1813. Richard Pattinson then represents Essex in McCormick's absence. After being released from captivity, William McCormick was re-elected to the Assembly for Essex in 1816 and again in 1820.

== Death ==
He died in Albany, New York on 1 January 1818, at around 45 years old, while returning to Montreal from New York City. He is buried at All Menands, New York, Albany Rural Cemetery. The inscription on his tombstone is in error lists his surname as "Pattirson."
