= Lucius V. Bierce =

American politician and military officer (1801–1876)

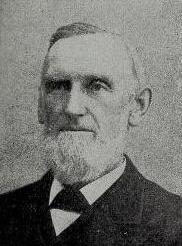
- Bierce in an 1887 publication

Member of the Ohio Senate from the 26th district
- In office January 1862 – May 1863
- Preceded by: James A. Garfield
- Succeeded by: Luther Day

Personal details
- Born: Lucius Verus Bierce; August 4, 1801 Cornwall, Connecticut, U.S.
- Died: November 11, 1876 (aged 75) Akron, Ohio, U.S.
- Spouse(s): Frances C. Peck (m. 1833; died 1839) Sophronia Ladd (m. 1840)
- Relations: Ambrose Bierce (nephew)
- Children: 2
- Education: Ohio University (BA)
- Occupation: Politician; military officer; lawyer; educator; writer

Lucius Verus Bierce (August 4, 1801 – November 11, 1876) was an American politician and military officer from Ohio. He was commander-in-chief of the Patriot forces in the Patriot War and a major in the American Civil War. He served in the Ohio Senate from 1862 to 1863 and was mayor of Akron for six terms in the mid-1800s.

== Early life ==
Lucius Verus Bierce was born on August 4, 1801, in Cornwall, Connecticut, to William Bierce. His father was a shoemaker and farmer. His father was descended from the English branch of the Norman French and his mother was descended from the Scottish branch. Following the death of his mother when he was about 15, he moved with his father to Nelson Township, Portage County, Ohio. He graduated from Ohio University with a Bachelor of Arts in 1822. He was a member of the Athenians, a literary society, and practiced debating with the society.

Following graduation, Bierce taught and was principal of an academy in Lancaster, South Carolina, for six weeks. Alongside teaching, he studied law under Robert J. Fennel of Yorkville. He then moved and continued to study law in Athens, Alabama. He was admitted to the bar in Alabama in September 1823. He then moved back to Ohio and studied law in the office of Jonathan Sloane in Ravenna. He was then admitted to the bar in Ohio in 1824 or 1825.

== Career ==
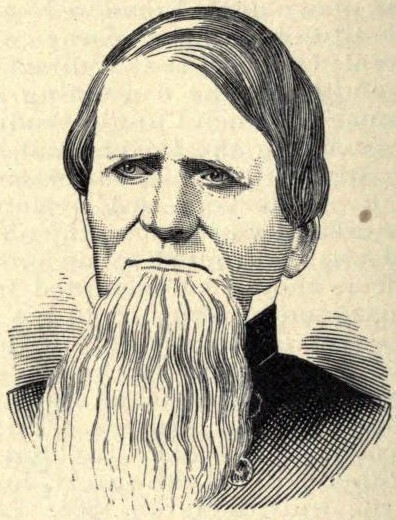
Sketch of Bierce

In 1826, Bierce was appointed as prosecuting attorney for Summit County and moved to Ravenna. He was elected into the role and served in it for 11 years. In 1837, he moved to Akron, Ohio. At the outbreak of the Patriot War in November 1837, he helped raise volunteers for the Patriots cause. From 1837 to 1838, he was in command of military forces at Fort Malden. He was later appointed as commander-in-chief of the Patriots. After the Battle of the Windmill in Prescott, Ontario, he led the remainder of the Patriot forces through western Canada, capturing Sandwich along the way. At the Battle of Windsor, his men set fire to the military barracks, guardhouse, and the steamer Thames. With 25 men remaining, he crossed back into Michigan. A reward of £2,000 was offered for his capture, but he never set foot on British soil again. He was indicted twice in the U.S. courts for violating neutrality laws, but the cases were dropped. Following the war, he returned to Akron and continued to practice law. In 1848, he had a law practice with Ezra B. Taylor. He had a law practice with Charles G. Ladd and later Alvin C. Voris.

Bierce was against slavery and helped John Brown in his raid on Harpers Ferry, either through supplying money or arms. At the outbreak of the Civil War in 1861, Bierce tried to enlist in the Union Army, but was rejected due to his age. He raised two companies of marines for the Union Navy and brought them to the Washington Navy Yard. He also raised about 100 artillery men for Konkle's Battery. While he was in Washington, D.C., he was elected to the Ohio Senate. He represented the 26th district from January 1862 to May 1863. He helped support the Greenback Law in the Ohio legislature. On April 13, 1863, he was appointed by President Abraham Lincoln as assistant adjutant general of the United States Volunteers with the rank of major. He was ordered to Columbus, Ohio, to serve as chief of staff of the acting assistant provost marshal general. On May 23, 1865, he was appointed to muster out troops in Wisconsin and then took command of Camp Washburn in Milwaukee and Camp Randall in Madison. He was discharged on in October or November 1865.

Following the temperance movement of the 1820s, he lectured on the topic of temperance. He served as mayor of Akron in 1839, 1841, 1844, 1849, and from 1867 to 1868. In 1847, he served as the president of the first board of education in Akron. He served twice as town trustee and three times as trustee of Portage Township. He was also the infirmary director of Summit County.

In 1854, Bierce wrote Historical Reminiscences of Summit County. He also translated Seneca the Younger's Morals.

== Personal life ==
Bierce married Frances C. Peck, a teacher in Ravenna, in 1833. They had one son, Walter. His wife died in 1839. He married Sophronia Ladd of Rutland, Vermont, and Akron on January 1, 1840. They had a daughter, Ella S. His nephew was writer Ambrose Bierce. Bierce joined the Masons in 1826 in Ravenna. He helped establish the Washington Chapter, No. 25 in Akron. He was elected as Grand Master of Masons of Ohio in 1853. He was a member of each Grand Lodge from 1841 to his death.

Bierce died on November 11, 1876, at his home in Akron.

== Legacy ==
On November 1, 1875, the Bierce Cadets of Akron were organized from Bierce's donation. Following his death, Bierce donated his entire property at the corner of High and Market streets, valued at US$35,000, to the city of Akron as a site for Bierce Park. The site became the Akron Public Library and a plaque was placed there to honor Bierce in 1935. He donated his personal library, fossil collection, presidential autographs, and a sword captured from Major Hume to the University of Akron.

Bierce Library at the University of Akron was named after him. He donated US$5,000 for books for a library at the university. The library burned in a fire in 1899. In 1916, the university dedicated Carl F. Kolbe Hall and the building included a collection called the Bierce Library. That building was razed in the 1950s for a new library. A new building was built in the 1970s and was again named Bierce Library in his memory.
