= William Elliott (Upper Canada politician) =

Lawyer, farmer and political figure in Upper Canada

William Elliott (1775 – 1867) was an English-born lawyer, farmer and political figure in Upper Canada. He represented Essex in the Legislative Assembly of Upper Canada from 1830 to 1834 as a Conservative.

He received a land grant and a townlot in Sandwich. Elliott was called to the Upper Canada bar in 1803. He served as an officer in the Essex Militia, later reaching the rank of colonel, and was also a captain in the Indian Department. He married Sophia Bouchette. Elliott was among those who lobbied for the creation of a Niagara and Detroit Rivers Rail Road, which received its charter in 1836.
