= 34th (Cumberland) Regiment of Foot =

British Army infantry regiment (1702-1881)

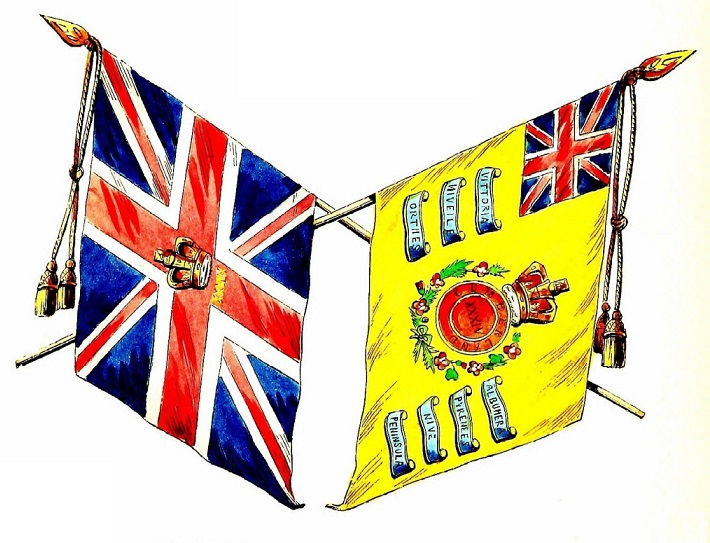
- Colours of the 34th (Cumberland) Regiment of Foot
- Active: 1702–1881
- Country: Kingdom of England (1702–1707) Kingdom of Great Britain (1707–1801) United Kingdom (1801–1881)
- Branch: British Army
- Garrison/HQ: Carlisle Castle
- Nickname: Cumberland Gentlemen
- Engagements: War of the Spanish Succession; Seven Years' War; American Revolutionary War; Napoleonic Wars; Upper Canada Rebellion; Crimean War; Indian Rebellion

The 34th Regiment of Foot was an infantry regiment of the British Army, raised in 1702. Under the Childers Reforms it amalgamated with the 55th (Westmorland) Regiment of Foot to form the Border Regiment in 1881.

== History ==
=== Early history ===
The regiment was raised in East Anglia by Colonel Lord Lucas as Lord Lucas's Regiment of Foot in February 1702 to fight in the War of Spanish Succession. The regiment embarked for Spain in May 1702 and took part in the siege of Barcelona in September 1705. The regiment was then garrisoned at Tortosa before returning to England in spring 1707. The regiment then embarked for France in July 1708 and fought at the siege of Lille in autumn 1708, the siege of Douai in spring 1709 and the siege of Bouchain in summer 1711. The regiment returned to England after the Treaty of Utrecht and was disbanded in spring 1713. The regiment was reformed without loss of precedence in 1715. It sailed in September 1719 and took part in the capture of Vigo in October 1719 during the War of the Quadruple Alliance and then returned home later in the year.

c. 1751 painting of a regimental grenadier (left)

The regiment embarked for Flanders in June 1744 and saw action at the Battle of Fontenoy in May 1745 during the War of the Austrian Succession. It was ordered home in September 1745 as part of the government response to the Jacobite rebellion and were in the right wing of the front line at the Battle of Culloden in April 1746. In 1751 a royal warrant declared that regiments should no longer be known by the name of their colonel, but their number in the order of precedence, and Conway's duly became the 34th Regiment of Foot.

=== Seven Years' War ===
Posted to Menorca in 1755, the regiment deployed a detachment of 26 officers, 29 sergeants, 19 Drummers, and 678 other ranks as part of Lord Blakeney's garrison (with the 4th, 23rd and 24th Regiments). As such they were besieged by a larger French force under Marshal Duke De Richelieu and retreated to Fort St Phillip. After a defence of two months' duration, at one point watching themselves being abandoned by the fleet under Admiral Byng, the British forces capitulated and retreated to Gibraltar. A second battalion was formed in 1757 to serve as marines. The regiment then took part in the raid on St Malo in June 1758, the raid on Cherbourg in August 1758 and the Battle of Saint Cast in September 1758.

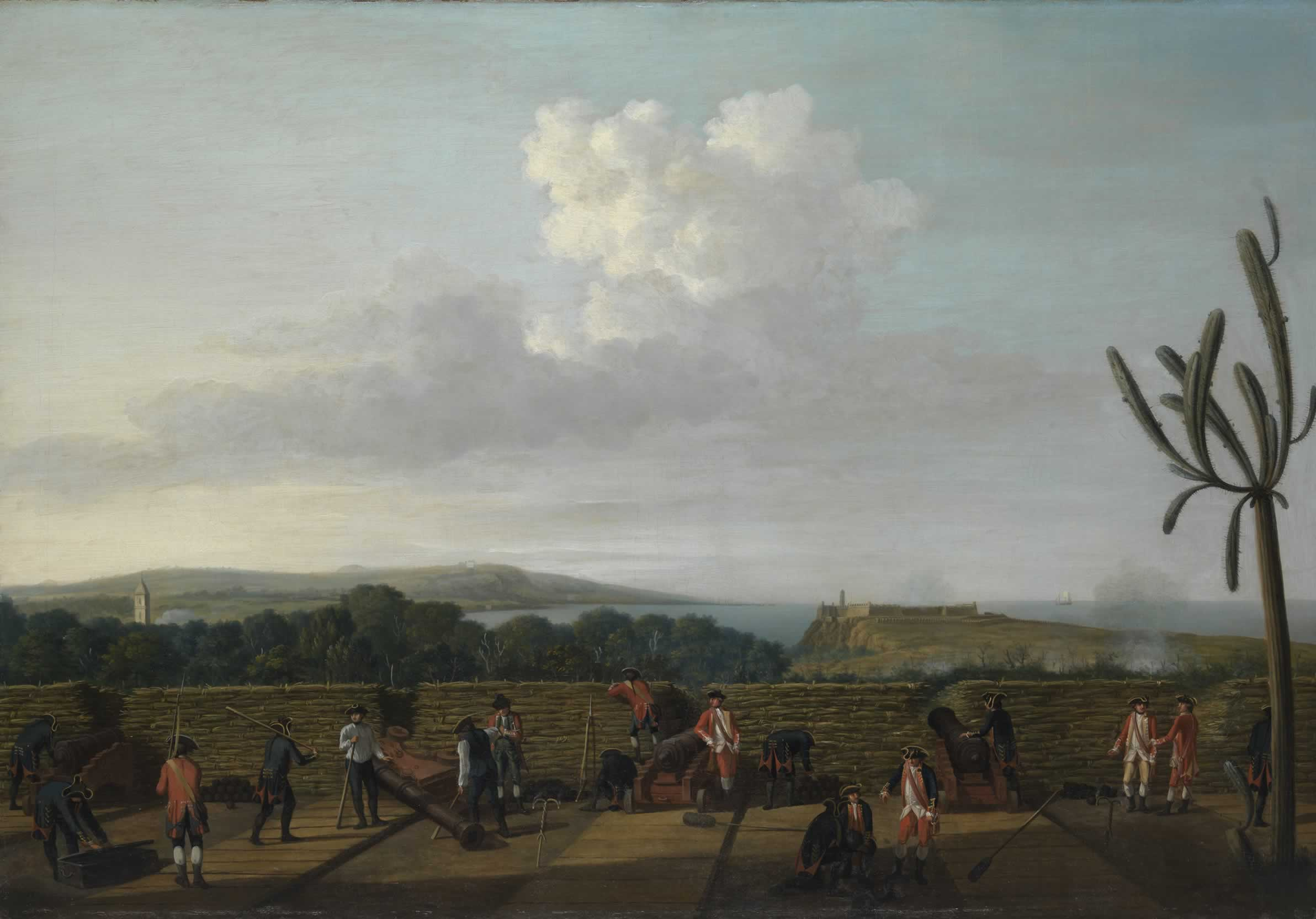
The siege of Havana, which the regiment fought in

The regiment departed with the British expedition against Cuba and was part of the besieging force which took Fort Morro in July 1762 and Havana in August 1762. It was ordered to return to England in 1763, but while en route the orders were changed and the 35th, along with the 22nd Regiment, was sent to garrison Mobile, part of the West Florida region transferred to Britain by the Treaty of Paris. In December 1765 the regiment moved upriver to Fort de Chartres in the Illinois Country, taking five months in transit, with detachments taking over a number of other posts. The regiment returned to England in 1768.

=== American Revolutionary War ===
The regiment was dispatched to Canada in spring 1776 and, while participating in numerous small skirmishes, drove out the American forces and forced them to abandon Fort Ticonderoga in July 1777. A detachment of the regiment under the command of Lieutenant Colonel Barry St. Leger also took part in the unsuccessful siege of Fort Stanwix. Captain Alexander Fraser, a veteran of the French and Indian War serving with the regiment, commanded what became known as the Company of Select Marksmen and saw action as skirmishers during the Saratoga campaign in autumn 1777. A number of other officers and other ranks, including Lieutenant Bright Nodder, were captured by the American forces and held as part of the Convention Army.

On 31 October 1780 the brig-sloop HMS Ontario was foundered during a violent storm and was sunk east of Fort Niagara on Lake Ontario with the loss of 80 lives including one officer, 34 other ranks, four women and five children from the regiment. The resting site of HMS Ontario remained a mystery until 2008 when the nearly pristine brig "was discovered resting partially on its side, with two masts extending more than 20 metres above the lake bottom", in approximately 150 meters of water "off the southern shore".

The regiment was granted the county title as the 34th (Cumberland) Regiment of Foot in 1782 but did not return to England until 1786.

=== Napoleonic Wars ===
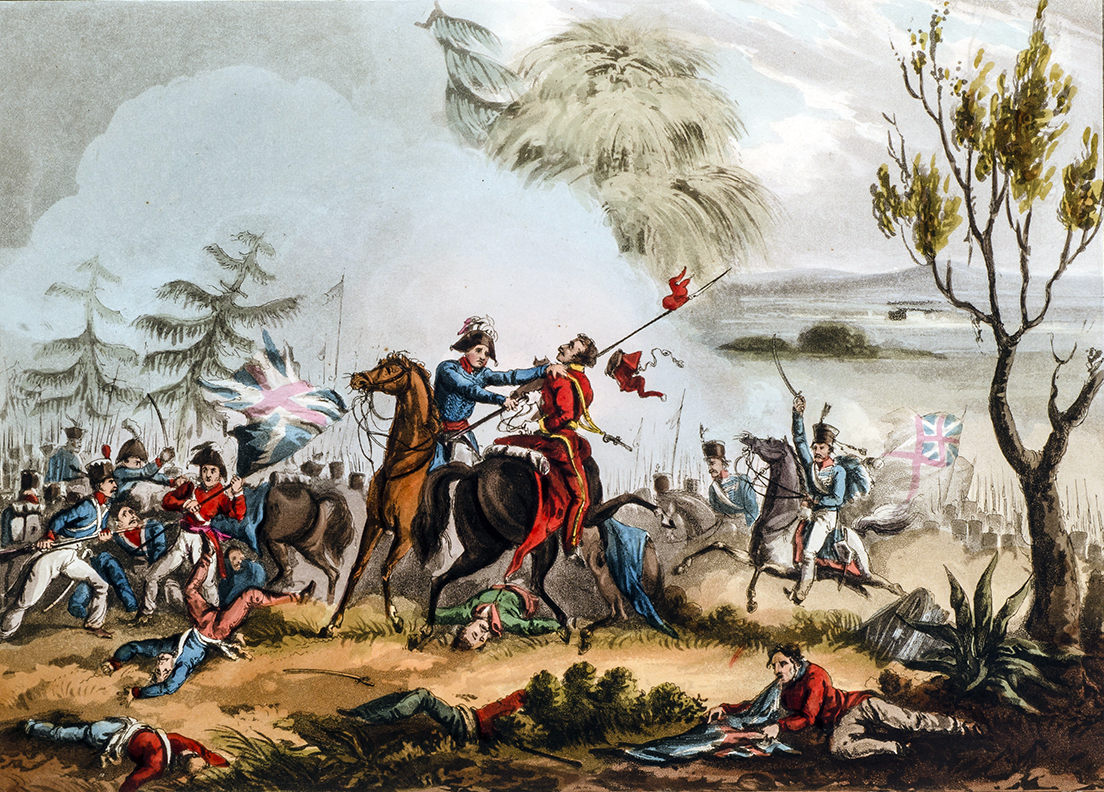
The Battle of Albuera, during which the regimental colours were successfully recovered after the colour-bearer was shot, in May 1811

The regiment was posted to the West Indies in February 1795 and was based in Saint Lucia where it defended the island from French forces and then suppressed a rebellion in Saint Vincent. The regiment returned to England in July 1797. It was posted to the Cape of Good Hope in 1800 and to India in 1802. It remained in India campaigning against the Maratha Empire for nineteen years before returning home.

A second battalion of the regiment was raised in 1804 serving in England and Jersey, and embarked for Portugal in July 1809 for service in the Peninsular Campaign of the Napoleonic Wars. The 2nd battalion took part in the siege of Badajoz in spring 1811 and the Battle of Albuera, (order of battle) during which the regimental colours were successfully recovered after the colour-bearer was shot, in May 1811. The battalion captured the drums and the Drum Major's mace of the French 34e Régiment at the Battle of Arroyo dos Molinos in October 1811. It went on to fight at the siege of Ciudad Rodrigo in January 1812, the Battle of Almaraz in May 1812 and the Battle of Vitoria in June 1813. It then pursued the French Army into France fighting at the Battle of the Pyrenees in July 1813, the Battle of Nivelle in November 1813 and the Battle of the Nive in December 1813 as well as the Battle of Orthez in February 1814 and the Battle of Toulouse in April 1814. The battalion then embarked for Ireland in July 1814.

=== Victorian era ===
In August 1829 the regiment was posted to Canada. A detachment from the regiment fought American Hunters' Lodges at the Battle of Windsor in December 1838 during the Upper Canada Rebellion. The regiment embarked for the journey back to England in June 1841. The regiment was then engaged suppressing Chartist riots in the North of England in 1842. The regiment next saw action at the siege of Sevastopol in winter 1854 during the Crimean War. It also fought at the siege of Cawnpore in June 1857 and the siege of Lucknow in autumn 1857 during the Indian Rebellion.

As part of the Cardwell Reforms of the 1870s, where single-battalion regiments were linked together to share a single depot and recruiting district in the United Kingdom, the 26th was linked with the 55th (Westmorland) Regiment of Foot, and assigned to district no. 2 at Carlisle Castle. On 1 July 1881 the Childers Reforms came into effect and the regiment amalgamated with the 55th (Westmorland) Regiment of Foot to form the Border Regiment.

== Battle honours ==
Battle honours won by the regiment were:

- Peninsular War: Albuhera, Arroyo dos Molinos, Vittoria, Pyrenees, Nivelle, Nive, Orthes, Peninsula
- Crimean War: Sevastopol
- Indian Mutiny: Lucknow
- West Indies: Havannah (awarded 1909 to The Border Regiment)

== Victoria Crosses ==
Victoria Crosses awarded to men of the regiment were:

- Private William Coffey, Crimean War (29 March 1855)
- Private George Richardson, Indian Mutiny (27 April 1859)
- Private John Joseph Sims, Crimean War (18 June 1855)

== Regimental Colonels ==
Colonels of the regiment were:

- 1702–1705: Robert Lucas, 3rd Baron Lucas of Shenfield
- 1705–1712: Hans Hamilton
- 1712–1723: Thomas Chudleigh
- 1723–1732: Robert Hayes
- 1732–1738: Hon. Stephen Cornwallis
- 1738–1742: Lord James Cavendish
- 1742–1749: Hon. James Cholmondeley
- 1749–1751: Hon. Henry Seymour Conway

=== 34th Regiment of Foot ===
- 1751–1754: Charles Russell
- 1754–1760: Thomas Howard, 2nd Earl of Effingham
- 1760–1797: Lord Frederick Cavendish

=== 34th (Cumberland) Regiment of Foot ===
- 1797–1810: George Fitzroy, 2nd Lord Southampton
- 1810–1816: Gen. Sir Eyre Coote
- 1816–1826: Gen. Hon. Sir Galbraith Lowry Cole
- 1826–1860: Sir Thomas Brisbane
- 1860–1874: Gen. John Eden
- 1874–1875: James Creagh
- 1875–1879: Gen. William Irwin
- 1879–1881: Gen. Alexander Maxwell

== Sources ==
- Cannon, Richard (1844). Historical Record of the Thirty-Fourth, or the Cumberland Regiment of Foot. London: Parker, Furnivall and Parker. OCLC 558537921.
