= Le Maçon =

Le Maçon is a French surname. Notable people with the surname include:

- Antoine Le Maçon (c. 1500–1559), French translator, royal councillor, treasurer for war and private secretary to Margaret, Queen of Navarre
- Robert le Maçon (c. 1365–1443), chancellor of France, adviser to Charles VII and supporter of Joan of Arc
- Robert le Maçon, Sieur de la Fontaine (1534/35–1611), French Reformed minister and diplomat

== See also ==
- Macon (surname)
- Maçon
