= Joseph Bouvier des Éclaz =

- Born: December 3, 1757
- Died: January 12, 1820 (aged 62)
- Conflicts: French Revolutionary Wars; Battle of Fleurus; Battle of Hohenlinden; Napoleonic Wars; Battle of Austerlitz; Battle of the Gebora; Battle of Borodino

Joseph Bouvier des Éclaz (December 3, 1757 – January 12, 1820) was a general of the First French Empire during the French Revolutionary Wars and Napoleonic Wars. He fought at the Battle of Fleurus in 1794, the Battle of Hohenlinden, the Battle of Austerlitz, the Peninsular War and the French invasion of Russia. He was made a general de brigade (brigadier general) in 1810. He was made a baron, commander of the Légion d'honneur and knight of the Order of Saint Louis.
