= Jean-Baptiste Maçon =

Upper Canada politician

Jean-Baptiste Maçon was a merchant and political figure in Upper Canada. He represented Essex in the Legislative Assembly of Upper Canada from 1830 to 1834 as a Conservative.

He received a land grant in Amherstburgh. Maçon was a captain in the Essex Militia and a justice of the peace for the Western District. He was of the Roman Catholic faith.
