= Battle of the Windmill National Historic Site =

Historic site in Ontario, Canada

Coordinates: 44.7209°N 75.4871°W

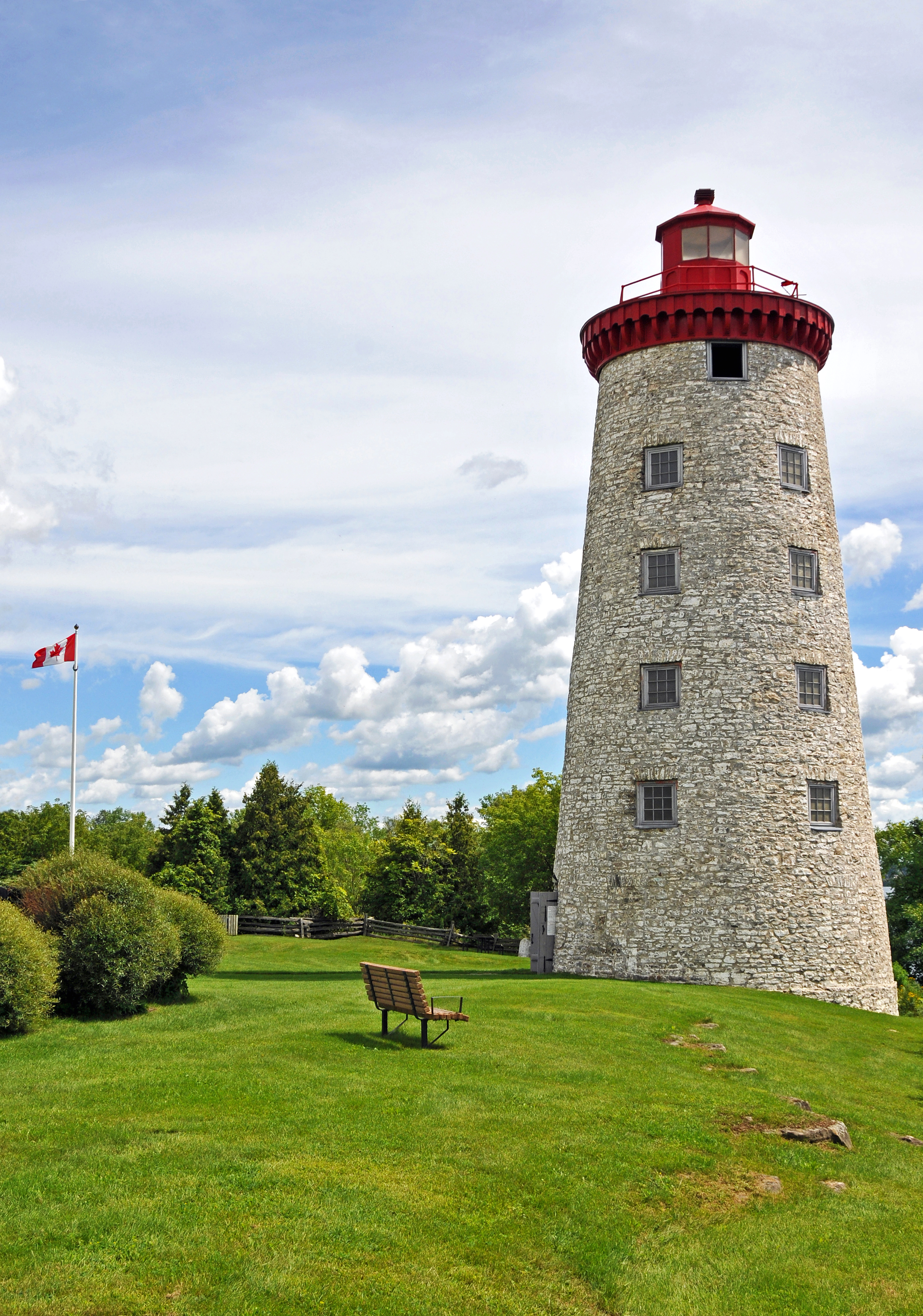
Battle of the Windmill NHS

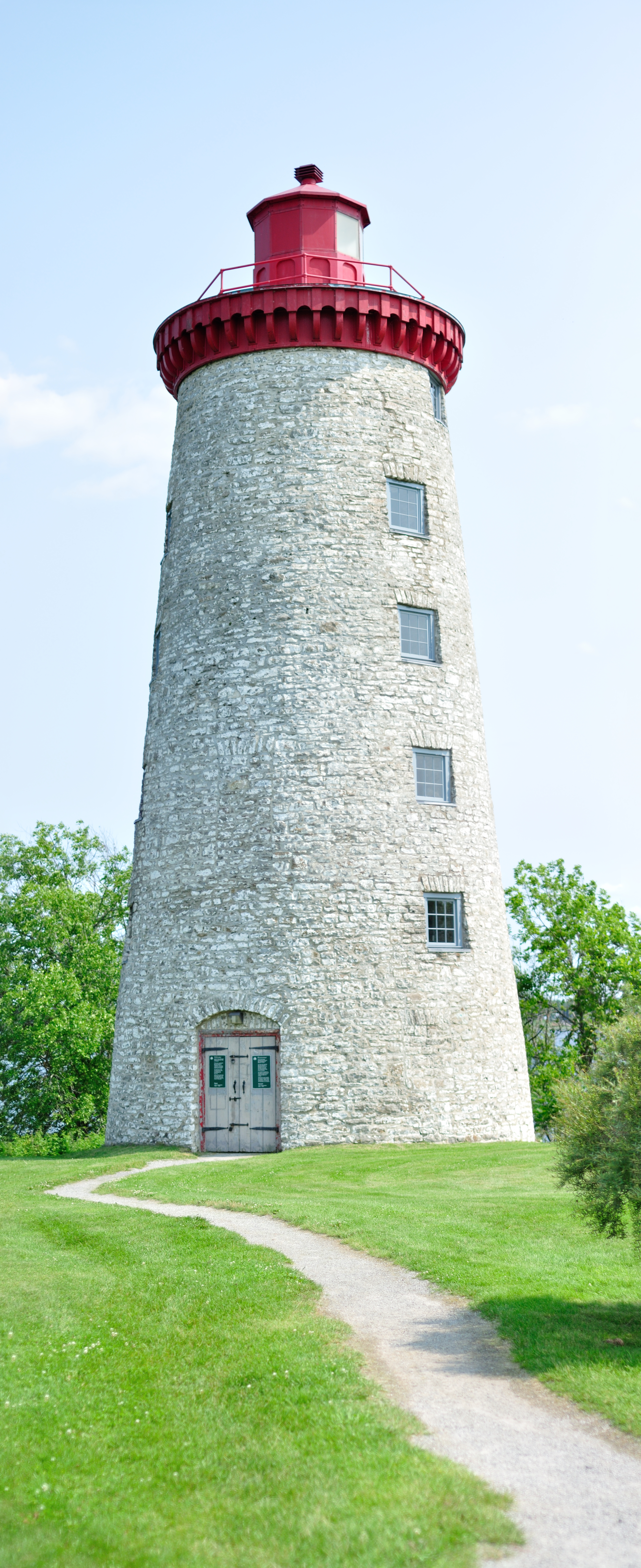
Battle of The Windmill 2015

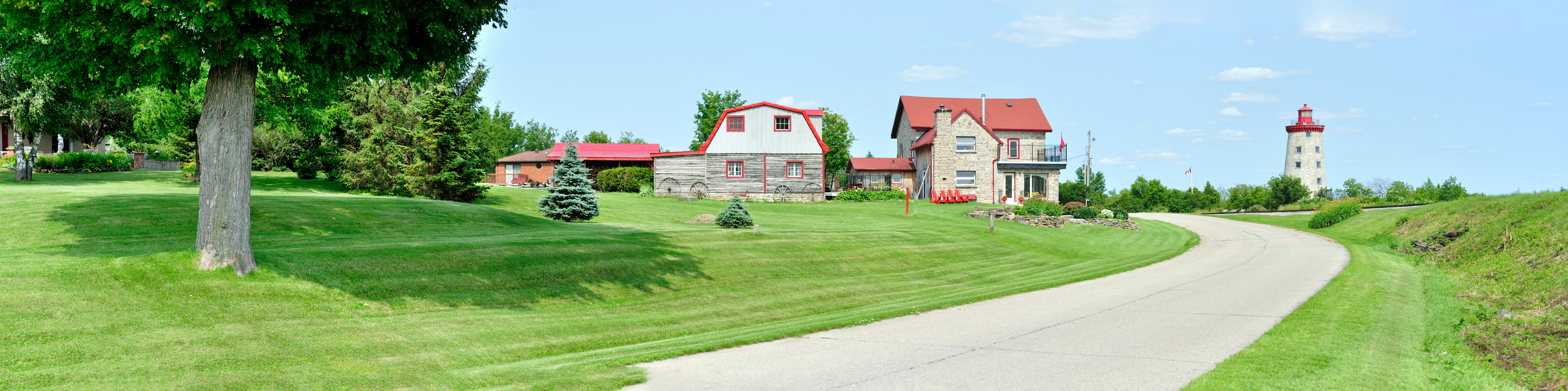
Around the Battle of The Windmill 2015

Battle of the Windmill National Historic Site marks the site of the November 1838 Battle of the Windmill, fought around a grist windmill near Prescott, Ontario, Canada. In 1873, the original grist windmill was converted into a lighthouse by the Canadian Department of Marine. The lighthouse became known as Windmill Point Light.

In 1996 the Friends of Windmill Point opened the 60-foot-tall stone lighthouse tower to the public as Battle of the Windmill National Historic Site, a National Historic Site of Canada. Visitors are led on a guided tour of the tower, and can climb to the top just below the lantern room for a view of the St. Lawrence River. There are interpretive panels about the battle, a video presentation, and a gift shop. The tower is open weekends in June and September, and daily in July and August, and is located on Windmill Point Road, off Highway 2, 3 km east of the town of Prescott, Ontario.

== See also ==
- Fort Wellington National Historic Site
