= Johanna von Schoultz =

Finnish and Swedish opera singer

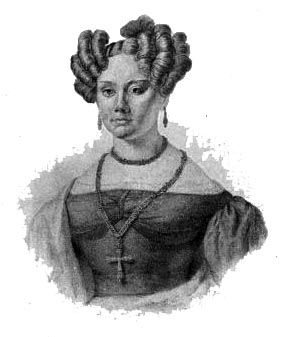
Johanna von Schoultz

Johanna Carolina Ulrika von Schoultz (1813 – 28 February 1863) was a Finnish and Swedish opera singer. She was a member of the Royal Swedish Academy of Music. She is counted as the second female Scandinavian opera singer (Justina Casagli) to have performed in Southern Europe.

== Life ==
Johanna von Schoultz was born in Stockholm, the daughter of the nobleman Nils Fredrik von Schoultz, governor of Vaasa, and Johanna Henrietta Gripenberg. Her brother was Nils von Schoultz. She was a student of Karl Magnus Craelius, and made her debut at a church concert in Stockholm in 1828. She was inducted to the Royal Swedish Academy of Music in 1831.

She performed in Milan, Naples and many of the most famous stages of Italy. In 1833, she made her debut at the Italian Opera in Paris opposite Giulia Grisi, where she made a success. However, due to health problems, her active career as a singer was relatively short, only about a decade.

After marrying Felix Brand, a wealthy civil engineer, she returned to Finland in the 1840s and settled in the town of Hämeenlinna, where she continued to work with music as a teacher of singing and piano, and as a chorus leader. She died in Helsinki.
