= John McLeod (Canada West politician) =

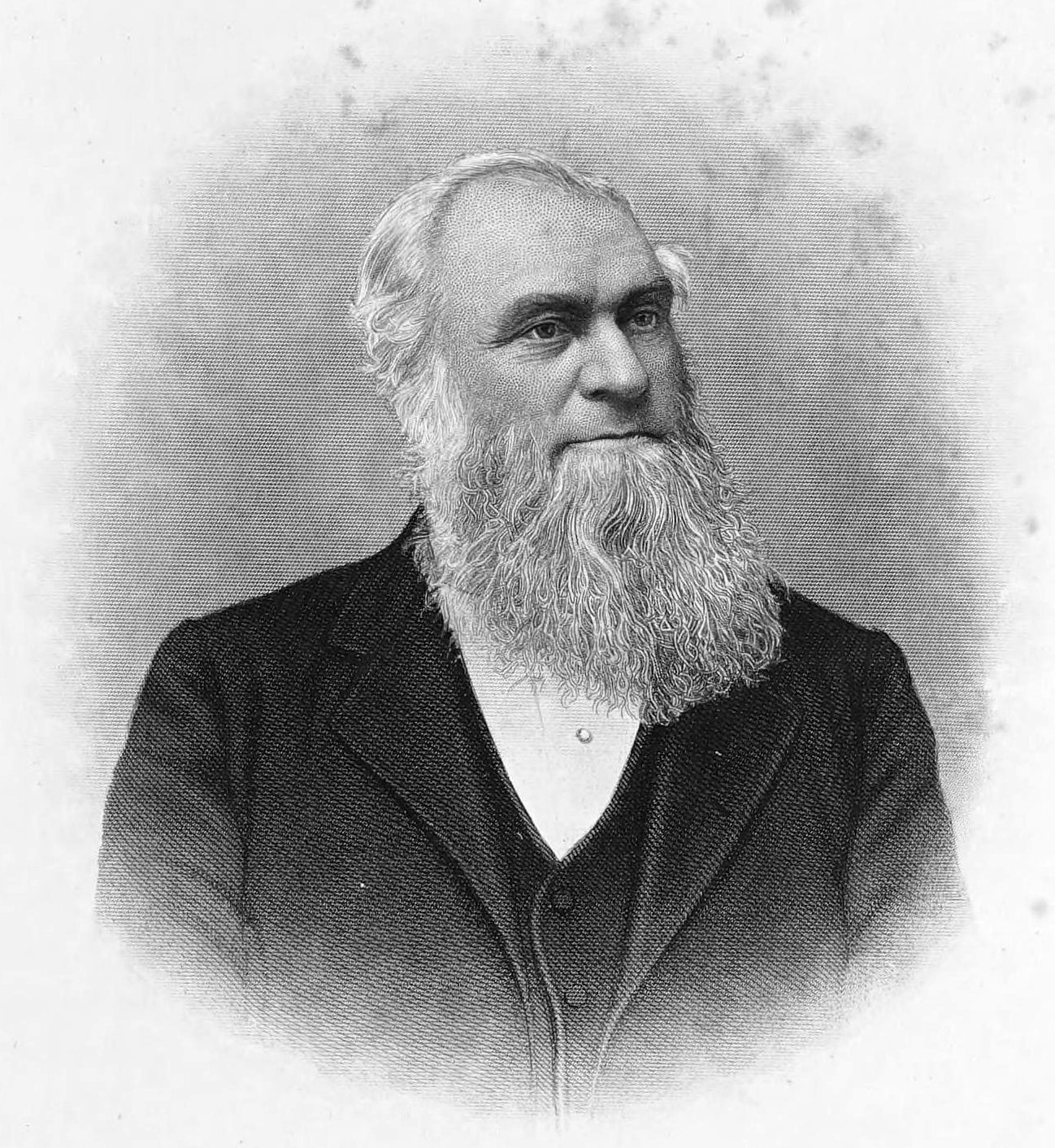
McLeod in an 1880 engraving

John McLeod (September 13, 1816 – July 1, 1887) was a Scottish-born merchant and political figure in Canada West. He represented Essex in the Legislative Assembly of the Province of Canada from 1858 to 1861 as a Conservative.

He was born in Edinburgh, the son of John McLeod and Ann Gordon, and came to Pictou, Nova Scotia with his family in 1832. McLeod was studying law and went to New York City with the intent of continuing his studies, but instead took a job as a clerk in a dry goods store. He entered business as a merchant in Detroit, later moving to Amherstburg. McLeod was also involved in shipbuilding and operated a distillery. In 1838, he married Mary Kenyon. In 1857, he defeated Arthur Rankin to win a seat in the assembly for the Province of Canada. McLeod died in Amherstburg at the age of 71.
