= Battle of Pelee Island =

1838 skirmish

- Part of the Patriot War
Date	March 3, 1838
Location	Pelee Island, Upper Canada 41°43′52″N 82°41′25″W
Result	British victory

Belligerents
Patriotes; Hunters' Lodges	(United Kingdom of Great Britain and Ireland) United Kingdom (United Kingdom of Great Britain and Ireland) Upper Canada; First Nations

Commanders and leaders
Lester Hoadley †	(United Kingdom of Great Britain and Ireland) George Brown

Strength
300	126

Casualties and losses
14 killed 18 wounded 11 captured	5 killed 25 wounded

The Battle of Pelee Island took place during the Patriot War along what is now the Ohio-Ontario nautical border in 1838 involving small groups of men on each side of the border seeking to overthrow British rule in Upper Canada.

== Prelude ==
On February 26, 1838, the frozen ice of Lake Erie allowed 300 Canadian and American Patriots under the command of Major Lester Hoadley to take Pelee Island at the western end of the lake. This prompted British Colonel John Maitland to send a force to recapture the island and secure it from further attack. Maitland sent Major George Browne with 126 men, comprising two companies of the British 32nd Regiment, a detachment of the Canadian St. Thomas Volunteer Cavalry, and a small band of First Nations warriors to cut off the invaders.

== Battle ==
On March 3, 1838, Browne's force intercepted the Hunter Patriots on the ice off the south western shore of the island and defeated them in a sharp fight. The British and Canadian casualties were 5 killed (4 from the 32nd Regiment and 1 Canadian cavalryman) and 25 wounded. On the Patriot side, Hoadley, his second-in-command, Captain Van Rensselaer, and 11 rank and file were killed by enemy fire; in addition to 1 man who drowned when he fell through the ice. 18 Patriots were wounded and a further 11 were captured, some of whom were also badly wounded.
