= Hunters' Lodges =

Secret U.S.-based militia formed during the 1837 Canadian rebellions

The Hunters' Lodge (French: Refuge des Chasseurs) was the last of a series of secret organizations formed in 1838 in the United States during the Rebellions in Upper and Lower Canada. The organization arose in Vermont among Lower Canadian refugees (the eastern division or Frères chasseurs) and spread westward under the influence of Dr Charles Duncombe and Donald McLeod, leaders of the short lived Canadian Refugee Relief Association, and Scottish-born former Mayor of Toronto William Lyon Mackenzie, drawing in support from many different areas in North America and Europe. They also absorbed Henry S. Handy's 'Secret Order of the Sons of Liberty' in Detroit into a Grand Lodge in Cleveland.

== Lodge organization ==
The Hunters Lodges were modelled on masonic lodges, and adopted similar secret signs, hierarchical orders, and rituals. The four degrees of the Lodge were: Snowshoe, Beaver, Grand Hunter and Patriot Hunter. Soldiers without rank were of the first degree, commissioned officers of the second, field officers of the third, and the highest ranking commissioned officers of the fourth degree.

They also utilized a secret code, sometimes printed in newspapers like the Buffalonian, to communicate orders.

Lodges existed across Vermont, western New York, Ohio and Michigan with particularly active sites being Watertown, Oswego, Salina (now Syracuse), Rochester, Buffalo, Cleveland, and Detroit.

== Convention and the Republic of Canada ==
In September 1838, 70 delegates from the western Hunters' Lodges attended a secret, week-long "Patriot Congress" in Cleveland, Ohio. They appointed a provisional Canadian republican government, electing:

1. President A.D. Smith, "chief justice of the peace at Cleveland"
2. Vice-President Colonel Nathan Williams, "a wholesale grocer" in Cleveland
3. Secretary of the Treasury Judge John Grant Jr, Oswego
4. Secretary of War Donald McLeod
5. Commander-in-chief of the "Patriot Army of the West," Lucius V. Bierce, "an attorney at Akron," mayor of Akron, Ohio.
6. Commissary General, a man named Brunson, of Buffalo
7. Commodore of the Patriot Navy on Lake Erie, Gilman Appleby, former Captain of the Caroline
8. Commodore of the Patriot Navy on Lake Ontario, Bill Johnston

To fund the war, they formed a joint stock bank, the Republican Bank of Canada, with Secretary of the Treasury John Grant, Jr. as President. They printed bills with pictures of Rebellion martyrs Samuel Lount and James Morreau on them. The official newspaper of the organization was the Bald Eagle published in Cleveland by Samuel Underhill.

== Politics ==
The leadership of the Patriot movement appears to have belonged to the small Equal Rights Party (known more popularly as the Locofocos). The small party emerged in 1836 in New York with a platform emphasizing radical republicanism, an end to the "moneyed aristocracy", and "Free Banking". The Republican Bank of Canada was formed on this basis. Dr Charles Duncombe was the author of Duncombe’s free banking: an essay on banking, currency, finance, exchanges, and political economy (Cleveland, Ohio, 1841); and Memorial to Congress upon the subject of Republican free banking (Cleveland, Ohio, 1841).

== See also ==
- Patriot War
- Frères chasseurs
- Secret society
