= Jessup =

Jessup may refer to people real or fictional

== People ==
- Laurence W. Jessup, Australian botanist whose standard author abbreviation is Jessup

=== Canadian ===
- Connor Jessup, Canadian actor, director and producer
- Edward Jessup, political figure in Upper Canada, and former British province in what is now Canada
- Edward Jessup, Jr., son of Edward Jessup
- Edward Jessup III, grandson of Edward Jessup
- Hamilton Dibble Jessup, brother of Edward Jessup III

=== American ===
- Elizabeth Jessup, American computer scientist
- Harley Jessup (born 1954), American special effects artist
- Joseph Jessup, American professional baseball player
- Justinian Jessup (born 1998), American basketball player
- Marion Jessup, American professional tennis player
- Morris K. Jessup, American writer on the subject of Unidentified Flying Objects (UFOs)
- William Jessup, Pennsylvania judge and notable Republican Party member
- Henry Harris Jessup, Presbyterian missionary and son of William Jessup
- Philip Jessup, American jurist and International Court of Justice judge between 1961 and 1970
- Ted Jessup, American television writer, producer, and performer

=== Fictional ===
- Avery Jessup, fictional character from 30 Rock
- Doremus Jessup, protagonist of the Sinclair Lewis novel It Can't Happen Here

== Places ==
- Jessup, Indiana, United States
- Jessup, Maryland, United States
- Jessup, Nevada, United States
- Jessup, Pennsylvania, United States

== Other uses ==
- Philip C. Jessup International Law Moot Court Competition
- Jessup Correctional Institution
- William Jessup University, private Christian institution in Rocklin, California

== See also ==
- Jessep
- Jessop
- Jesup (disambiguation)
