= Edward Jessup (disambiguation) =

Edward Jessup is the name of:

- Edward Jessup (1735–1816), Canadian soldier, judge and politician
- Edward Jessup Jr. (1766–1815), Canadian politician
- Edward Jessup III (1801–1831), Canadian politician
- Edward Jessup, character in Altered States
