= Minshall =

Minshall is a surname. Notable people with the surname include:

- Diane Anderson-Minshall (born 1968), American journalist and author best known for writing about lesbian, gay bisexual and transgender subjects
- Jacob Anderson-Minshall (born 1967), American author
- Charles Minshall Jessop (1861–1939), mathematician at the University of Durham working in algebraic geometry
- Barbara J. Minshall (born 1953), Canadian Thoroughbred racehorse trainer and owner who has competed both in Canada and the United States
- Jim Minshall (born 1947), former Major League Baseball pitcher
- Merlin Minshall (1906–1987), often claimed to have been one of the inspirations behind James Bond, the fictional spy created by Ian Fleming
- Peter Minshall (born 1941), Trinidadian Carnival artist (described colloquially in Trinidad and Tobago as a "mas-man")
- Richard Minshall (died 1686), English academic, Master of Sidney Sussex College, Cambridge from 1643
- Thaddeus A. Minshall (1834–1908), Republican politician in the U.S. State of Ohio, judge on the Ohio Supreme Court 1886–1902
- William Edwin Minshall Jr. (1911–1990), Republican U.S. Congressman from Ohio

== See also ==
- Minshall, Indiana, an unincorporated community in Raccoon Township, Parke County, Indiana, United States
- Insall
- Mishal
