= Samuel Sherwood (Canadian politician) =

Lawyer and politician in Upper Canada and Lower Canada

Samuel Sherwood (fl. 1777 – c. 1821) was a lawyer and political figure in early Canada.

He was born in the Thirteen Colonies, the son of Justus Sherwood, a United Empire Loyalist who settled in Augusta Township in Upper Canada. He studied law in Montreal and was admitted to the Upper Canada bar. He served as a scout with Edward Jessup's Loyal Rangers during the American Revolution. In 1790, he was appointed justice of the peace in the Mecklenburg District. He represented Grenville in the Legislative Assembly of Upper Canada from 1800 to 1808.

In 1812, he moved to Lower Canada. He was elected in 1814 to represent Effingham in the Legislative Assembly of Lower Canada and re-elected in 1816. He was admitted to the Lower Canada bar in 1817 and practised law in Montreal in 1821. He died some time during or after 1821.

His brother, Levius Peters Sherwood, served as a member of the legislative assembly in Upper Canada.
