= John Meyers (loyalist) =

John Walden Meyers
- Born: January 22, 1745; Albany County, New York
- Died: November 22, 1821; Belleville, Ontario
- Occupations: Spy, miller, pioneer, businessman, soldier
- Known for: Founder of Belleville
- Military Service
- Allegiance: Great Britain; Upper Canada
- Branch: British Army; Canadian Militia
- Service years: 1777-1812
- Rank: Captain
- Units: King's Loyal Americans; Loyal Rangers; Hastings Militia
- Conflicts: American Revolution: Northern New York Campaign; War of 1812

John Walden Meyers (January 22, 1745 – November 22, 1821) was an Upper Canada businessman and United Empire Loyalist.

He was born Johannes Waltermyer in Albany County, New York on January 22, 1745. He was descended from German immigrants. When the American Revolutionary War began, he left home for Quebec, reportedly receiving bear meat from a friendly native tribe en route. In 1777, he joined the army of Major-General John Burgoyne and served as a recruiter for the loyalist forces, also collecting information for the British and carrying dispatches.

In 1781, he led an unsuccessful raid on the house of Philip Schuyler. Later that year, Meyers became a Captain in Edward Jessup's Loyal Rangers. After the war, he was offered a land grant and first settled on Lake Champlain, but was later forced by the British to move further north along the north shore of Lake Ontario in 1785. He was named a justice of the peace in 1788.

In 1790, he settled in Thurlow Township where he built a gristmill near the mouth of Meyer's Creek, now the Moira River. He had one of only two brick houses in Ontario at the time. The community that sprung up there, first known as Meyer's Creek, was renamed Belleville in 1816. Meyers also built a sawmill, distillery and brick kiln and established a trading post at Meyer's Creek. He built boats and provided transportation between the area and Kingston, Upper Canada and Montreal, Lower Canada. Meyers later helped prepare a report for the township in response to the questionnaires distributed by Robert Gourlay and his son attended Gourlay's convention in York, Upper Canada in 1818.

When United Empire Loyalists fled to Canada during the Expulsion of the Loyalists they often brought anyone they had enslaved with them. John Myers was no exception - "he enslaved four black people, including two children, for at least 11 years. The father’s name was Obadiah Levi, the mother’s name has been lost to history and the children’s names were Joseph and Betty Levi." Meyers did free his slaves before legally required to do so. As a result of his slave owning, a local school's name was changed so that it no longer honours him.

He lived to the age of 76, dying of fever in Belleville on November 22, 1821.
