= Hamilton Dibble Jessup =

Upper Canada doctor and politician

Hamilton D. Jessup
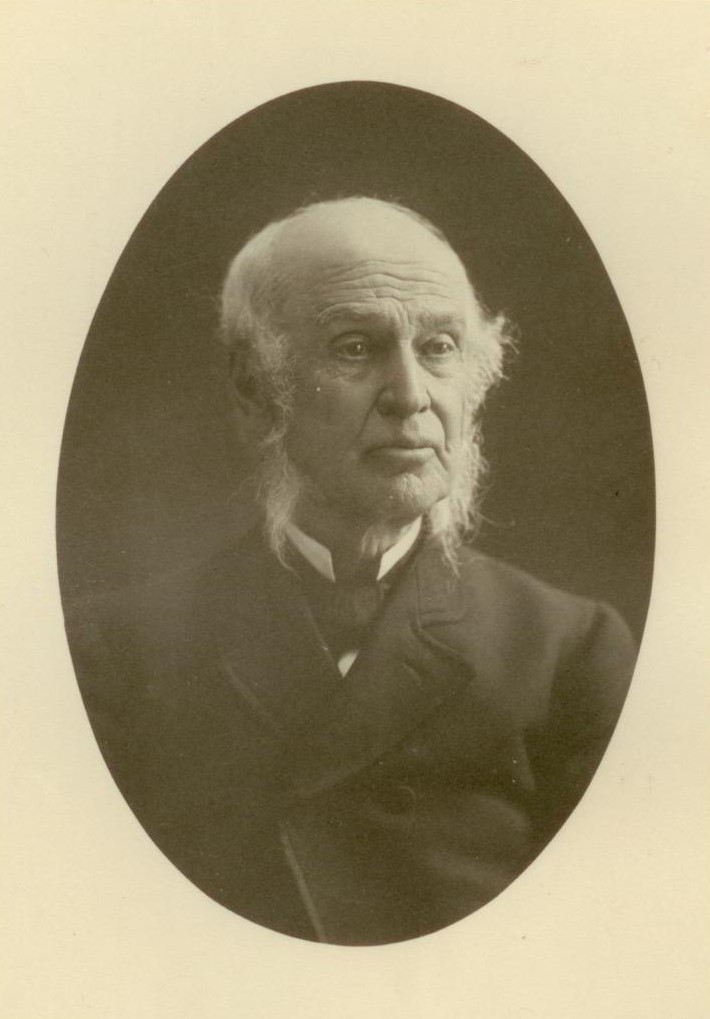

Member of the Legislative Assembly of the Province of Canada for Grenville
- In office 1844–1847
- Preceded by: Samuel Crane
- Succeeded by: Reed Burritt

Mayor of Prescott
- In office 1830–1840

Personal details
- Born: May 2, 1806 Augusta Township, Upper Canada
- Died: November 24, 1892 (aged 86) Prescott, Ontario
- Relatives: Edward Jessup (grandfather); Edward Jessup, Jr. (father); Edward Jessup III (brother)
- Occupation: Doctor, Soldier, Politician

Military service
- Allegiance: Upper Canada
- Branch/service: Canadian militia
- Years of service: 1829-1870
- Rank: Captain; Lieutenant-Colonel
- Unit: Grenville Militia (1829-37, 1840-55); Prescott Volunteer Battalion (1838-39); 1st Prescott Rifle Company (1856-66); 56th Grenville Regiment (1867-70)
- Commands: Fort Wellington (1865-66)
- Battles/wars: Rebellions of 1837–1838: Battle of the Windmill; Fenian Raids: Prescott 1866; Prescott 1870

Hamilton Dibble Jessup (May 2, 1806 – November 24, 1892) was a medical doctor, militiaman, and political figure in Canada West. He came from the founding family of Prescott, Ontario.

He was the son of Edward Jessup, Jr. and the grandson of Edward Jessup, a United Empire Loyalist. He studied medicine in Montreal and opened a practice in Prescott, Ontario. He served 10 terms as mayor of Prescott.

Jessup first joined the Grenville Militia in 1829 as an Ensign eventually rising to Captain, and commanded the Prescott Volunteer Battalion at the Battle of the Windmill in 1838. He raised and commanded the 1st Prescott Rifle Company in 1856 which later became the 56th Grenville Regiment of which was he Lieutenant-Colonel. He commanded the 56th Grenville Battalion during the Fenian Raids and was in overall command of Fort Wellington.

He represented Grenville in the 2nd Parliament of the Province of Canada. He was customs collector at Prescott from 1867 to 1885.

His older brother, Edward Jessup III, represented Grenville in the Legislative Assembly of Upper Canada.
