= Jessop =

- Pronunciation: /ˈdʒɛsəp/
- Language: English

Origin
- Language: Middle English
- Meaning: Joseph

Other names
- Alternative spelling: Jessopp, Jessope, Jessup, Jessep

Jessop is a surname. Notable people with the surname include:

- Bob Jessop (born 1946), British Marxist theoretician
- Carolyn Jessop (born 1968), American author
- Charles Minshall Jessop (1861–1939), English mathematician
- Christine Jessop (1974–1984), Canadian child murdered in 1984
- Clytie Jessop (1929–2017), British actress
- Craig Jessop (born 1949), American academic
- Elisha Jessop (1843–1918), Canadian doctor and politician
- Flora Jessop (born 1969), American social activist
- George H. Jessop (1852–1915), Irish playwright
- Gilbert Jessop (1874–1955), English cricketer
- Gilbert Jessop (cricketer, born 1906), his son, also an English cricketer
- Graham Jessop (1957–2012), English marine archaeologist
- Greg Jessop, fictional character from the British soap opera EastEnders
- Job Dean Jessop (1926–2001), American thoroughbred jockey
- Josias Jessop (1781–1826), English civil engineer notable for work on canals and railways
- Keith Jessop (1933–2010), English salvage diver
- Peter Jessop (born 1964), American film actor
- Violet Jessop (1887–1971), Argentine nurse and ocean liner stewardess who survived the sinking of the RMS Titanic in 1912
- William Jessop (disambiguation), multiple people
- Willie Jessop, leader of Fundamentalist Church of Jesus Christ of Latter Day Saints

== See also ==
- Jessep, a surname
- Jessop & Company, Indian engineering company
- Jessop & Son, department store in the English city of Nottingham now trading as John Lewis & Partners
- Jessop of Leicester, British photography retailer now trading as Jessops
- Jessup (disambiguation)
