= James Morrow Walsh =

Canadian politician (1840–1905)

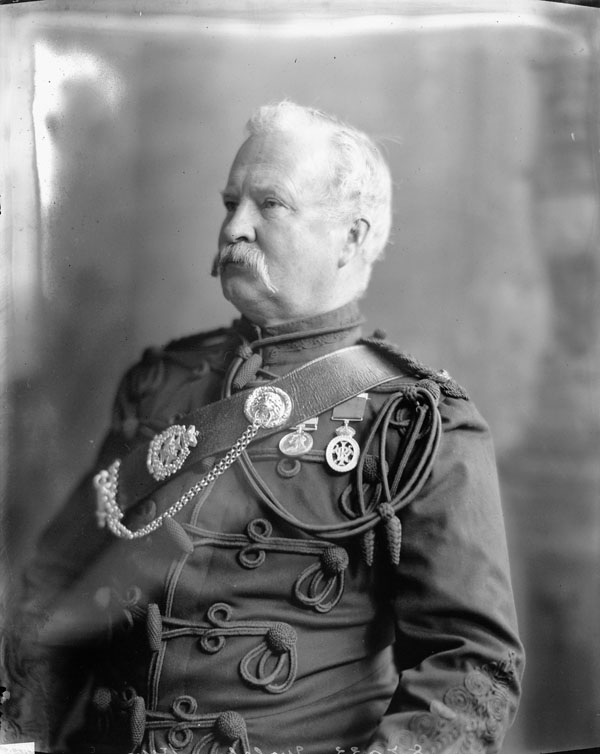

Commissioner of the Yukon Territory
- In office 1897–1898
- Preceded by: Territory established
- Succeeded by: William Ogilvie

Personal details
- Born: May 22, 1840 Prescott, Upper Canada
- Died: July 25, 1905 (aged 65) Brockville, Ontario
- Occupation: NWMP Superintendent, Militiaman, Politician

Military service
- Allegiance: Canada
- Branch/service: Canadian militia
- Years of service: 1866-1883
- Rank: Lieutenant; Superintendent
- Unit: 2nd Prescott Rifle Company; 56th Grenville Battalion; North-West Mounted Police
- Commands: Fort Walsh
- Battles/wars: Fenian Raids: Prescott 1866; Prescott 1870; Northwest Disturbances: Fort Walsh; Wood Mountain Fort

James Morrow Walsh (22 May 1840 – 25 July 1905) was a North-West Mounted Police (NWMP) officer and the first commissioner of Yukon.

Born in Prescott, Ontario, James Walsh was one of the original officers of the NWMP. Walsh served with the 2nd Prescott Rifle Company at Fort Wellington during the 1866 Fenian Raid and with the 56th Grenville Battalion during the 1870 raid. He was awarded the Canada General Service Medal with two clasps.

Superintendent Walsh was assigned in 1875 to establish a post in the Cypress Hills in what is now Saskatchewan. He named it Fort Walsh after himself. The location of the post was determined by the Cypress Hills Massacre in 1873, an atrocity stemming from the illegal American whiskey trade. Walsh's original role was to shut down this trade, but in June 1876 his position grew in importance when several thousand Sioux crossed the border into Canada, taking refuge there after the Battle of Little Big Horn. They settled near the Wood Mountain post in present-day Saskatchewan.

Walsh developed a strong friendship with the famous Sioux leader Sitting Bull and successfully kept peace in the region. By the summer of 1877, Walsh, although still in command of Fort Walsh, spent little time there. His headquarters became the Wood Mountain post, among Sitting Bull and 5,000 Sioux. During this time, Walsh became famous in the American press as "Sitting Bull's Boss." In reality, Walsh was unable to fulfill his orders to convince Sitting Bull to return to the U.S. The Canadian government decided that Walsh's friendship with Sitting Bull was an obstacle to the Sioux's return to the United States, and in 1880 he was transferred to Fort Qu'Appelle, Saskatchewan. Soon after, he took health leave and returned to Ontario. He reluctantly resigned his commission three years later.

In August 1897, during the height of the Klondike Gold Rush, Walsh was appointed Commissioner of the newly created Yukon Territory. He resigned soon after in 1898. His successor was William Ogilvie. He died in Brockville, Ontario in 1905.

Mount Walsh, a mountain peak in the Saint Elias Mountains in the Yukon is named after him.

Preceded by office created	Commissioner of Yukon; 1897–1898	Succeeded by William Ogilvie
