= Grenville Regiment =

Military unit based in Ontario, Canada

The Grenville Regiment (Lisgar Rifles)
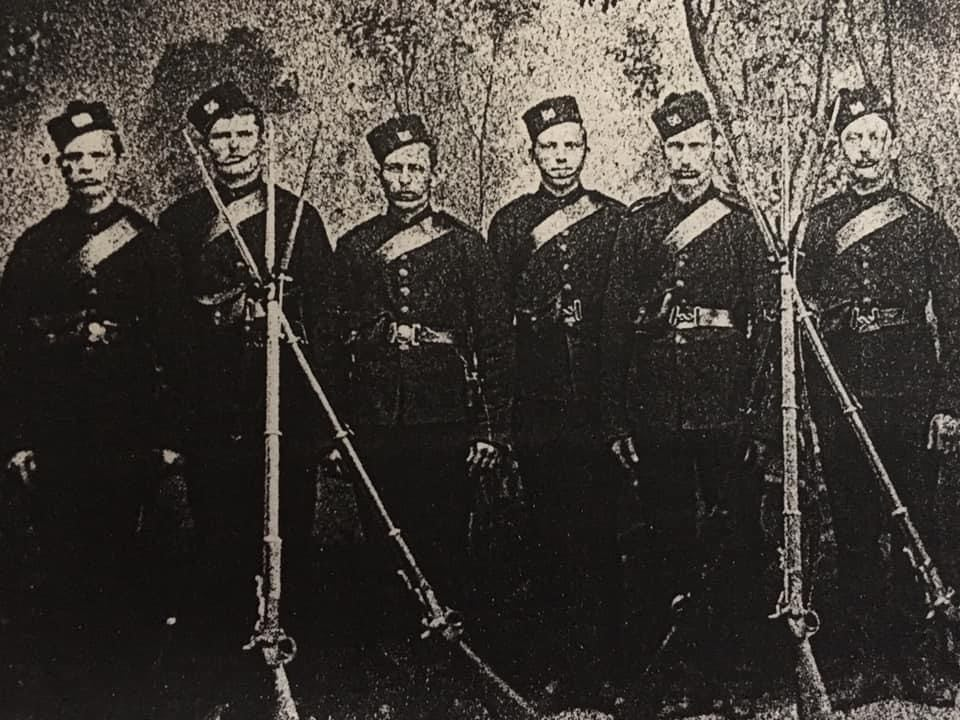
- Soldiers of the 56th Grenville Regiment, c.1866
- Active: 1866-1936
- Country: Canada
- Branch: Canadian Militia
- Type: Rifle regiment
- Role: Infantry
- Size: One Regiment
- Part of: Non-Permanent Active Militia
- Garrison/HQ: Prescott, Ontario; Kemptville, Ontario
- Engagements: Fenian Raids; First World War

Commanders
- Notable commanders: Col. Hamilton Jessup

The Grenville Regiment (Lisgar Rifles) was an infantry regiment of the Non-Permanent Active Militia of the Canadian Militia (now the Canadian Army) based in Grenville County, Ontario.

In 1936, the regiment was converted to artillery and would later become part of the 50th Field Artillery Regiment (The Prince of Wales Rangers), RCA (currently on the Supplementary Order of Battle).

== History ==
The 56th Prescott Battalion of Infantry was raised from various volunteer militia companies in Grenville County and was composed of Grenville and Dundas men. The volunteer companies were called out on active service during the Fenian Raids in 1866, serving along the St. Lawrence River frontier at Fort Wellington in Prescott. The battalion was commanded by Col. Hamilton Jessup, who also commanded Fort Wellington in 1866.

The 56th Grenville Battalion of Infantry was called out again for active service on 24 May 1870, serving at Cornwall and was removed from active service on 3 June 1870.

On the outbreak of the First World War, on August 6, 1914, the 56th Grenville Regiment was called out for active service as part of the St. Lawrence River Canal Patrol, guarding the locks and canals along the St. Lawrence River. Men from the regiment would go on to serve in Europe with the CEF.

== Lineage ==
=== The Grenville Regiment (Lisgar Rifles) ===
- Originated on 12 April 1867, in Prescott, Ontario, as the 56th Prescott Battalion of Infantry.
- Redesignated on 9 August 1867, as the 56th Grenville Battalion of Infantry.
- Redesignated on 13 September 1871, as the 56th Grenville Battalion of Rifles.
- Redesignated on 29 September 1871, as the 56th Grenville Battalion "Lisgar Rifles".
- Redesignated on 8 May 1900, as the 56th Grenville Regiment "Lisgar Rifles".
- Redesignated on 12 March 1920, as The Grenville Regiment (Lisgar Rifles).
- Amalgamated on 15 December 1936, with the 56th Field Battery, RCA, and redesignated as the 56th (Grenville) Field Battery, (Howitzer), RCA.

== Organization ==
=== 56th Prescott Battalion of Infantry (12 April 1867) ===
- No. 1 Company (first raised on 3 April 1856 as the 1st Prescott Rifle Company)
- No. 2 Company (first raised on 11 February 1857 as the 2nd Prescott Rifle Company)
- No. 3 Company (first raised on 30 January 1863 as the Burritt's Rapids Infantry Company)
- No. 4 Company (first raised on 8 June 1866 as the Millar's Corners Infantry Company) - included men from the companies of the Dundas County Militia
- No. 5 Company (first raised on 20 July 1866 as the Aultsville Infantry Company)
- No. 6 Company (first raised on 15 June 1866 as the Ottawa and Prescott Railway Infantry Company)

No. 2 Company was headquartered in Iroquois, Dundas County from the mid-1890s until 1906, when it was transferred to Merrickville.

=== The Grenville Regiment (Lisgar Rifles) (15 February 1921) ===
- 1st Battalion (without perpetuation)
- 2nd (Reserve) Battalion

== Notable Members ==
- Col. Hamilton D. Jessup - 1st Prescott Rifles (1856–66) & 56th Grenville Battalion (1867–70)
- James Morrow Walsh - 2nd Prescott Rifles (1866) & 56th Grenville Battalion (1867–70)
