= Edward Jessup Jr. =

Upper Canada politician

Member of the Legislative Assembly of Upper Canada for Grenville
- In office 1797–1800
- Preceded by: Ephraim Jones
- Succeeded by: Samuel Sherwood

Justice of the Peace for Johnstown
- In office 1800–1810

Personal details
- Born: May 26, 1766 Albany, New York
- Died: November 4, 1815 (aged 49) Prescott, Ontario
- Relatives: Edward Jessup (father); Edward Jessup III (son); Hamilton Dibble Jessup (son)
- Occupation: Farmer, Militiaman, Politician

Military service
- Allegiance: Great Britain; Upper Canada
- Branch/service: British Army; Canadian militia
- Years of service: 1781-1815
- Rank: Captain; Lieutenant-Colonel
- Unit: Jessup’s Rangers (1781-1784); Leeds Militia (1788-1815)
- Commands: Leeds Militia (1795-1809)
- Battles/wars: American Revolutionary War: Northern New York Campaign; War of 1812

Edward Jessup (May 26, 1766 – November 4, 1815) was a farmer and political figure in Upper Canada.

He was born in Albany, New York in 1766, the son of Edward Jessup, a United Empire Loyalist. He served with his father's Loyal Rangers, becoming a Captain. After the American Revolution, he settled in Augusta Township. Jessup represented Grenville in the Legislative Assembly of Upper Canada from 1797 to 1800. In 1800, he was named justice of the peace in the Johnstown District. He became Lieutenant-Colonel in the Leeds militia in 1809. With his father, he laid out the town of Prescott in 1810. He died at Prescott in 1815.

Two of his sons also represented Grenville in the legislative assembly:

- Edward in the 11th Parliament of Upper Canada
- Hamilton Dibble in the 2nd Parliament of the Province of Canada.
