= Grenville (Province of Canada electoral district) =

Province of Canada electoral district

Grenville Canada West
Province of Canada electoral district

Defunct pre-Confederation electoral district
- Legislature: Legislative Assembly of the Province of Canada
- District created: 1841
- District abolished: 1867
- First contested: 1841
- Last contested: 1863

Grenville was an electoral district of the Legislative Assembly of the Parliament of the Province of Canada, in Canada West. Based on Grenville County, it was located on the north shore of the Saint Lawrence River, east of Lake Ontario. It was created in 1841, upon the establishment of the Province of Canada by the union of Upper Canada and Lower Canada. Grenville was represented by one member in the Legislative Assembly. It was later split into two ridings, in a redistribution.

== Boundaries ==
Grenville electoral district was located on the north shore of the Saint Lawrence River in the eastern area of Canada West, east of Kingston. It was based on Grenville County (now the United Counties of Leeds and Grenville).

The Union Act, 1840 had merged the two provinces of Upper Canada and Lower Canada into the Province of Canada, with a single Parliament. The separate parliaments of Lower Canada and Upper Canada were abolished. The Union Act provided that the pre-existing electoral boundaries of Upper Canada would continue to be used in the new Parliament, unless altered by the Union Act itself.

Grenville County had been an electoral district in the Legislative Assembly of Upper Canada, and its boundaries were not altered by the Union Act. Those boundaries had originally been set by a proclamation of the first Lieutenant Governor of Upper Canada, John Graves Simcoe, in 1792:

That the fourth of the said counties be hereafter called by the name of the county of Grenvill; which county is to be bounded on the east by the westernmost line of the county of Dundas, on the south by the river St. Lawrence, and on the west by the easternmost boundary line of the late township of Elizabethtown, running north twenty-four degrees west until it intersects the Ottawa or Grand river, thence descending the said river until it meets the northwesternmost boundary of the county of Dundas. The said county of Grenvill is to comprehend all the islands in the said river St. Lawrence nearest to the said county, in the whole or greater part fronting the same.

The boundaries had been further defined by a statute of Upper Canada in 1798:

That the townships of Edwardsburg, Augusta, Wolford, Oxford on the Rideau, Marlborough, Montague and Gower, (called North and South Gower) together with such of the Islands in the river Saint Lawrence as are wholly or in greater part opposite thereto, shall constitute and form the County of Grenville.

Since Grenville electoral district was not changed by the Union Act, those boundaries continued to be used for the new electoral district. Grenville was represented by one member in the Legislative Assembly.

== Members of the Legislative Assembly ==
Grenville was represented by one member in the Legislative Assembly. The following were the members for Grenville.

Parliament	Years	Member	Party
1st Parliament; 1841–1844	1841–1844	Samuel Crane	Unionist; Reformer

== Abolition ==
The district was later split into two different ridings, in a redistribution.
