= Fort Walsh =

Historic site in Saskatchewan, Canada

Coordinates: 49.572747°N 109.881456°W

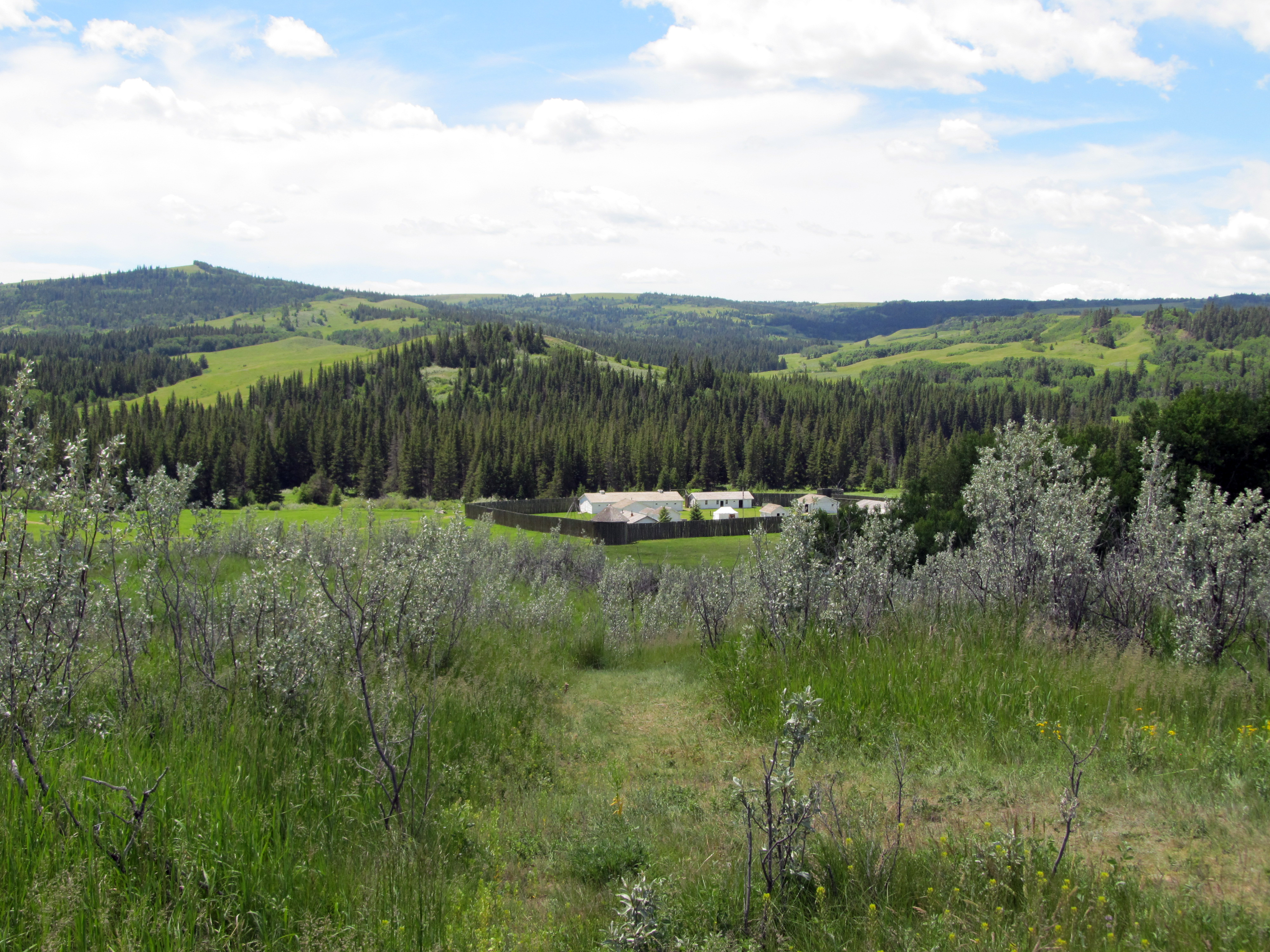
- Interactive map of Fort Walsh
- Type: Fort
- Location: RM of Maple Creek No. 111, Saskatchewan, Canada
- Nearest city: Maple Creek

History
- Established: 1873 trading post; 1878 Headquarters NWMP
- Founder: North-West Mounted Police
- Built: 1875 (original); c. 1940 (reconstructed)
- Event: Cypress Hills Massacre

Site notes
- Governing body: Parks Canada
- Website: Fort Walsh National Historic Site

National Historic Site of Canada

Fort Walsh
- Cypress Hills (Canada)
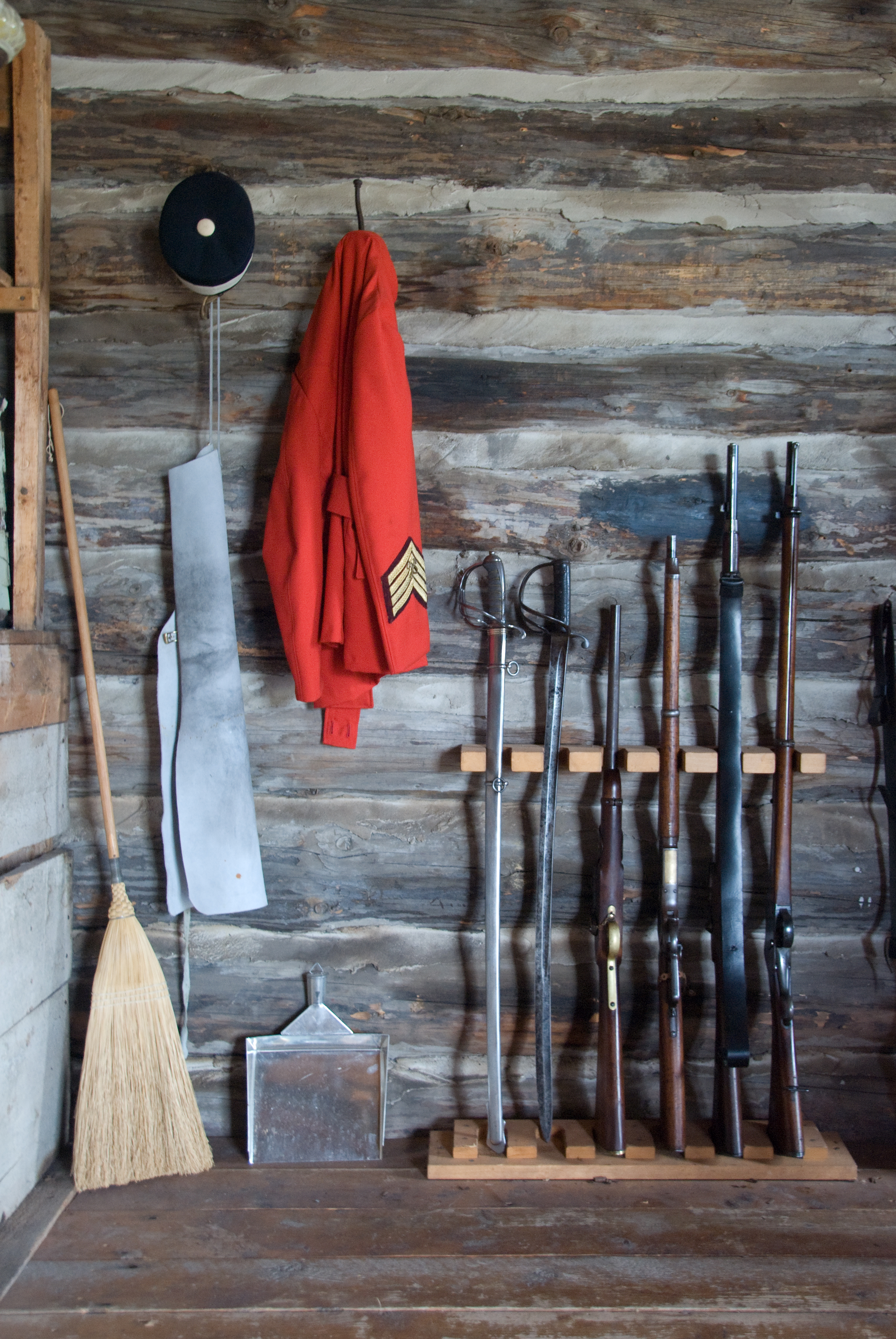

Site information
- Type: Fort
- Controlled by: North-West Mounted Police

Site history
- Built: 1875
- In use: until 1883
- Fate: Demolished, later reconstructed as national historic site
- Battles/wars: Cypress Hills Massacre

Garrison information
- Past commanders: James Morrow Walsh

Fort Walsh is a National Historic Site of Canada that was a North-West Mounted Police (NWMP) fort. Administered by Parks Canada, it forms a constituent part of Cypress Hills Interprovincial Park.

The fort was built in June 1875 and was named for its builder, inspector James Morrow Walsh. The fort was intended to curb the illegal whisky trade, protect Canada's nearby border with the United States, and aid with native policy. These factors had been brought to public attention following the Cypress Hills Massacre of 1873 and resulted in Prime Minister John A. Macdonald's establishment of the NWMP.

Assiniboine chiefs Man Who Takes the Coat, Long Lodge, and Lean Man signed adhesion to Treaty 4 at the fort on September 25, 1877.

Fort Walsh served as the NWMP headquarters from 1878 to 1882. In 1883 the fort was closed and dismantled.

The site of the fort was designated a National Historic Site of Canada in 1924. The fort was later reconstructed in the 1940s to breed horses for the Royal Canadian Mounted Police and the Musical Ride.

Tourists can tour the fort's buildings, the former townsite, cemeteries, and the whisky trading post. On September 28, 2004, Fort Walsh became part of the Cypress Hills dark-sky preserve.

On June 28, 1985, Canada Post issued "Fort Walsh, Sask., circa 1880", one of the 20 stamps in the "Forts Across Canada" series (1983–1985). The stamps are perforated 12 1/2 × 13 mm and were printed by Ashton-Potter Limited based on the designs by Rolf P. Harder.

== See also ==
- List of National Historic Sites of Canada in Saskatchewan
