= Royal Canadian Rifle Regiment =

Regiment of the British Army for service in Canada

- Active: 1840–1870
- Country: United Kingdom
- Branch: British Army
- Type: Rifle regiment
- Role: Light Infantry
- Size: One Regiment
- Nickname(s): The Bullfrogs

The Royal Canadian Rifle Regiment of the British Army was raised in 1840 for service in Canada. Its members were veterans of service in other regiments of the British Army.

== Formation ==
The concern which led to the creation of the regiment was the continuing problem of desertion. Soldiers of the British Army in garrison in Canada were often tempted to flee to the United States from which they would not be deported. At garrisons located close the international border such as Fort Mississauga in Niagara, Fort Malden in Amherstburg and Fort Wellington in Prescott, the problem of desertion was epidemic during and after the War of 1812.

In order to combat this problem, the Royal Canadian Rifle Regiment only recruited veterans of at least 15 years' service in the British Army. These men were thought to be more reliable than their younger counterparts. In addition, the pay of private soldiers in the regiment was doubled to two shillings per day instead of the normal one shilling per day. They were also offered the prospect of a pension upon completion of 21 years of military service and free grants of land.

Starting in 1840, the regiment was spread out in detachments from St. John's in Newfoundland to Winnipeg in Manitoba.

Another unusual feature of the Royal Canadian Rifle Regiment was its uniform and tactical employment. While most infantry in the British Army wore redcoats into the 1880s and 1890s and fought with smoothbore muskets into the 1850s, during the Napoleonic Wars the Army had experimented with regiments of rifle-armed infantry who wore green uniforms in an early attempt at camouflage. Deployed as skirmishers, these men of the King's Royal Rifle Corps, the 60th Regiment, and the 95th Regiment, performed sterling service throughout the Peninsular War and the Waterloo Campaign in 1815.

After the War of 1812, the Duke of Wellington opined that light infantry and rifle-armed skirmishers would prove of great value in any future campaigns in North America. Taking this advice, the British Army elected to embody the new, veterans' regiment as a rifle regiment rather than a more traditional infantry regiment.

The initial weapon of the Royal Canadian Rifle Regiment was the Baker rifle. In 1841, the Army adopted a percussion lock rifle called the Brunswick rifle.

In 1862 it absorbed the Royal Newfoundland Companies, formed in 1824 as Royal Veteran Companies and renamed in 1842.

== Disbandment ==
The Royal Canadian Rifle Regiment was disbanded on 30 September 1870 at Kingston.

Fort Wellington is a national historic site operated by Parks Canada and depicts the period 1846. At this time, a company of the Royal Canadian Rifle Regiment was in garrison at the Fort and visitors can see guides in the uniform of this regiment as well as a restored barracks.

== Ice hockey within the regiment ==
In 1941, the Canadian Amateur Hockey Association (CAHA) appointed a committee to write a history of hockey in Canada, led by James T. Sutherland, including W. A. Hewitt and Quebec hockey executive George Slater. In 1943, the committee concluded that hockey had been played in Canada since 1855, and that Kingston and Halifax had equal claims to be the birthplace of hockey, since both cities hosted games played by the Royal Canadian Rifle Regiment. The report also stated that Kingston had the first recognized hockey league in 1885, which merged into the Ontario Hockey Association in 1890.
