= Sam Crane =

Sam Crane may refer to:

- Sam Crane (second baseman) (1854–1925), American baseball player and sportswriter
- Sam Crane (shortstop) (1894–1955), American baseball player
- Sam Crane (actor), British actor
- Samuel Crane, Canadian businessman and political figure
