= Jesup =

Jesup may refer to:

- Jesup, Georgia
- Jesup, Iowa

== People ==
- Morris Ketchum Jesup (1830–1908), banker, philanthropist, president of the American Museum of Natural History and the Peary Arctic Club.
- Thomas Sidney Jesup (1788–1860), American general

== See also ==
- Jessup (disambiguation)
- Jessop (surname)
- Jesup North Pacific Expedition
