= Samuel Crane =

Businessman and politician in Province of Canada

Member of the Legislative Assembly of the Province of Canada for Grenville
- In office 1841–1842
- Monarch: Victoria
- Governors General: Lord Sydehham (1841); Sir Charles Bagot (1842–1843); Lord Metcalfe (1843–1845)
- Preceded by: New position
- Succeeded by: Hamilton Dibble Jessup

Member of the Legislative Council of the Province of Canada
- In office 1849–1858
- Governors General: Lord Elgin (1847–1854); Sir Edmund Walker Head (1854–1861)

Personal details
- Born: 1794 Massachusetts
- Died: November 13, 1858 (aged 63–64) Prescott, Canada West
- Spouse: Eunice
- Children: Ten children: eight daughters, two sons
- Occupation: Businessman; freight forwarding; shipping

Samuel Crane (1794 – November 13, 1858) was a businessman and political figure in Canada West.

== Biography ==
Samuel Crane was born in Massachusetts in 1794 and had settled in Lower Canada by 1820. He became a partner in a forwarding business at Lachine, west of Montreal. The firm owned a share in the Ontario, an American steamship operating on the Great Lakes. Crane moved to Prescott in Upper Canada some time later and partnered with John Macpherson of Kingston in the transporting of goods and passengers.

The Crane-MacPherson partnership dominated the forwarding business in the area, in part because of their alliance with the Ottawa and Rideau Forwarding Company which controlled the forwarding trade on the lower Rideau Canal. In 1837 at the age of 43, Crane became a director of the Commercial Bank of the Midland District.

In 1838, Crane stood for election to the Legislative Assembly of Upper Canada in a by-election, but withdrew before the poll. In 1841, he was elected to the Legislative Assembly of the Province of Canada for Grenville in 1841. He supported the union of the Canadas and was generally a moderate supporter of the Reformer, but was frequently absent from the sessions. In 1849, he was named to the Legislative Council.

In the early 1850s, the partners began to sell off their assets due to declining business and the nearing completion of the Grand Trunk Railway in the area. When the company that purchased much of their business failed in 1857, the partnership was dissolved and declared bankruptcy.

By 1858, Crane largely had stopped attending the Legislative Council and his seat was declared vacant due to lack of attendance.

Crane died at Prescott in 1858.
