= Jessep =

Jessep is a surname. Notable people with the name include:

- Alexander William Jessep (1892–1991), Australian botanist
- Ted Jessep (1904–1983), rugby union player
- Thomas Jessep (c. 1848–1916), Australian politician

== Fictional characters ==
- Nathan Jessep, fictional colonel in the film A Few Good Men

== See also ==
- Jessop
- Jessup (disambiguation)
