= Elizabeth Jessup =

American computer scientist

Elizabeth Redding Jessup is an American computer scientist specializing in numerical linear algebra and the generalized minimal residual method. She is a professor emerita of computer science at the University of Colorado Boulder.

== Education and career ==
Jessup is one of three children of an Indianapolis tax attorney. She majored in mathematics at Williams College, and went to Yale University for graduate study, earning a master's degree in applied physics and a Ph.D. in computer science there. Her 1989 dissertation, Parallel Solution of the Symmetric Tridiagonal Eigenproblem, was supervised by Ilse Ipsen; she was Ipsen's first student.

She joined the University of Colorado Boulder faculty in 1989, as the only woman on the computer science faculty. She became chair of the computer science department there twice, taking advantage of the position to focus on improving both faculty diversity and job satisfaction, before retiring in 2019.

== Contributions ==
Jessup is a coauthor of the book An Introduction to High-Performance Scientific Computing (with Lloyd D. Fosdick, Carolyn J. C. Schauble, and Gitta Domik, MIT Press, 1996).

In 2008, she founded a biennial conference, the Rocky Mountain Celebration of Women in Computing.
