= William Jessop (disambiguation) =

William Jessop may refer to:

- William Jessop (died 1734), English lawyer and Member of Parliament
- William Jessop (1745–1814), English civil engineer
- William E. Jessop, American leader in the Fundamentalist Church of Jesus Christ of Latter-Day Saints
- Willie Jessop, American leader of and spokesperson for the Fundamentalist Church of Jesus Christ of Latter-Day Saints
- William J. E. Jessop (1902–1980), Irish academic, medical practitioner and politician
- Willie Jessop (footballer) (1922–1994), English footballer
- Will Jessop, British Filmmaker
