= William Ogilvie (surveyor) =

Canadian Dominion land surveyor and explorer

William Ogilvie FRGS
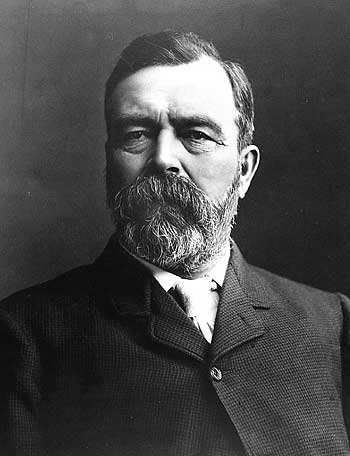
- Born: April 7, 1846; Ottawa, Canada West
- Died: November 13, 1912 (aged 66); Winnipeg, Manitoba, Canada
- Occupation: Land surveyor
- Years active: 1865–1892
- Employer: Dominion of Canada (1875–1901)
- Known for: Surveying large tracts of land in western Canada, particularly in the Klondike
- Notable work: Early Days in the Yukon
- Title: Commissioner of the Yukon
- Term: 1898–1901
- Predecessor: James Morrow Walsh
- Successor: James Hamilton Ross
- Spouse: Mary Ogilvie (Sparks)

William Ogilvie FRGS (April 7, 1846 – November 13, 1912) was a Canadian Dominion land surveyor, explorer, and the commissioner of Yukon.

He was born on a farm in Gloucester Township, Canada West. He was born to James Ogilvie of Belfast Ireland and Margaret Holliday Ogilvie of Peebles, Scotland. Ogilvie articled as a surveyor with Robert Sparks, qualifying to practice as a Provincial Land Surveyor in 1869. He married Sparks' sister Mary, a school teacher, on March 8, 1872. He worked locally as a land surveyor, qualified as a Dominion Land Surveyor in 1872 and was first hired by the Dominion government in 1875.

He was responsible for numerous surveys from the 1870s to the 1890s, mainly in the Prairie Provinces. From 1887 to 1889, Ogilvie was involved in George Mercer Dawson's exploration and survey expedition in what later became the Yukon Territory. He surveyed the Chilkoot Pass, the Yukon and Porcupine rivers. Ogilvie established the location of the boundary between the Yukon and Alaska on the 141st meridian west.

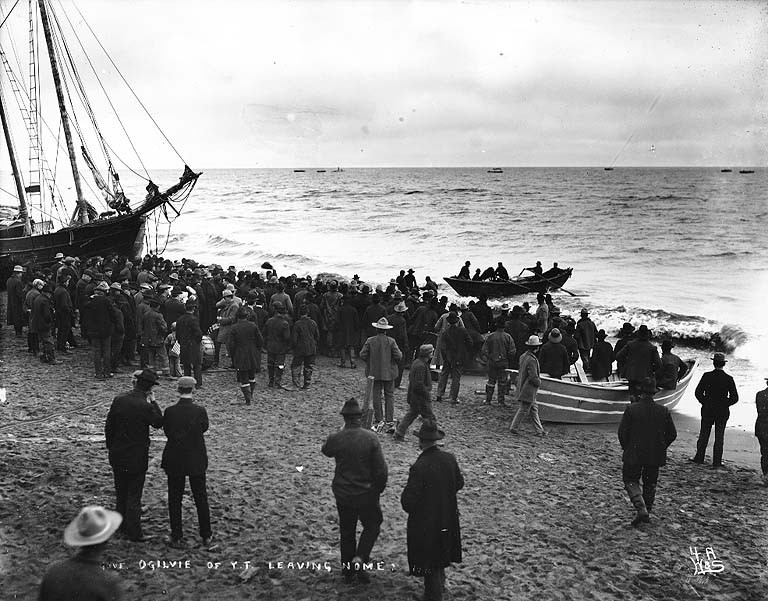
"Governor" Ogilvie of Y.T. departing the beach at Nome

During the Klondike Gold Rush, he surveyed the townsite of Dawson City and was responsible for settling many disputes between miners. Ogilvie became the Yukon's second Commissioner in 1898 at the height of the gold rush and resigned because of ill-health in 1901.

He was the author of Early Days on the Yukon (1913), which is still available in facsimile reprints. The Ogilvie Mountains, Ogilvie River and Ogilvie Aerodrome in the Northern Yukon Territory along with Ogilvie Valley in the Southern Yukon Territory are named after him.

Ogilvie performed the following surveys for the Surveyor-General of Canada:

- 1875 – 76—Township outlines south of Dauphin.
- 1878 – 79—Surveys of Indian Reserves, Bow River.
- 1880—Township outlines West of York.
- 1881—Fourth meridian to Township 40.
- 1882—Seventh base line West of Fourth meridian.
- 1883—Fifth meridian from Edmonton to Athabasca River and Twenty-first base line Westerly.
- 1884—Micrometer survey of Peace River from Chipewyan to Dunvegan and Athabasca River from Slave River to Athabasca Landing.
- 1885—Traverse along C.P.R. in British Columbia.
- 1887—Exploration surveys—Yukon River and Mackenzie River.
- 1888 – 89—Surveys and explorations—Porcupine, Lewes, Bell, Trout and Peel River.
- 1890—Exploration survey between Lake Temiscamingue and Hudson Bay.
- 1891—Examination between Liard and Peace Rivers.
- 1892—Subdivision and re-surveys in Prince Albert District.

== Legacy ==
'Pride and Perseverance', a Gloucester Museum display which ran September to May 1994, honoured native son William Ogilvie. Mount Ogilvie on the US–Canada border was named in his honour by both countries.

== See also ==
- North-West Mounted Police in the Canadian north

Preceded by James Morrow Walsh	Commissioner of Yukon; 1898–1901	Succeeded by James Hamilton Ross
