= Fort Wellington =

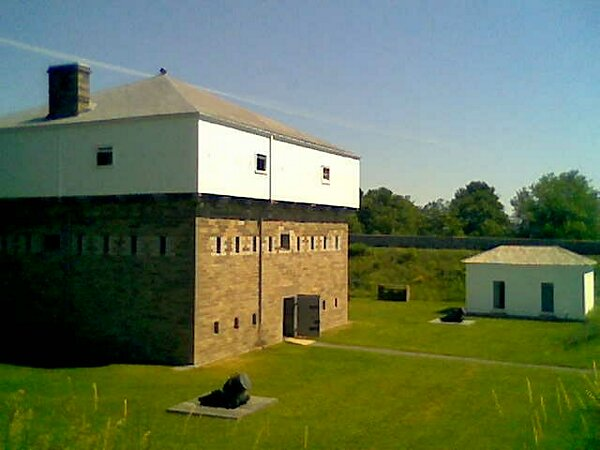
- Fort Wellington's blockhouse and latrine from the southwest, 2006

- Location within Southern Ontario Location within Ontario Location within Canada
- 44.7129°N 75.5085°W
- Location: Prescott, Ontario, Canada

History
- Built: 1813–1814
- Original use: Military fortification (1813–14; 1838–1923)
- Rebuilt: 1838–1839

Site notes
- Architect(s): George R. J. Macdonnell and Thomas Pearson (first fort)
- Governing body: Parks Canada
- Website: pc.gc.ca/en/lhn-nhs/on/wellington/index

National Historic Site of Canada
- Official name: Fort Wellington National Historic Site of Canada
- Designated: 30 January 1921

Fort Wellington National Historic Site is a historic military fortification located on the north shore of the St. Lawrence River at Prescott, Ontario. The military fortification was used by the British Army, and the Canadian militia for most of the 19th century, and by the militia in the 20th century, until 1923, when the property was handed over to the Dominion Parks Commission, the predecessor to Parks Canada. The fort was earlier named a National Historic Site of Canada in January 1920.

Built in the midst of the War of 1812, the British commissioned the construction of the fortification in 1813 to protect the head of the Gallop Rapids in the St. Lawrence. Completed in 1814, the fort was abandoned by the British shortly after the war, although it formally remained the property of the British Board of Ordnance. The British commissioned the construction of a new fort, on top of the earthwork of the first fort in 1838, during the onset of the Rebellions of 1837–1838. Completed in 1839, the fort was used by the British Army, and the Canadian Militia.

The fort was used by the British until 1863, when British units left the area, making the militia the fort's sole occupant. The militia continued to use the fort until 1923, when it handed over the property to the Dominion Parks Branch, the predecessor to Parks Canada. As a National Historic Site, Fort Wellington operates as a historical open-air museum.

== Location ==
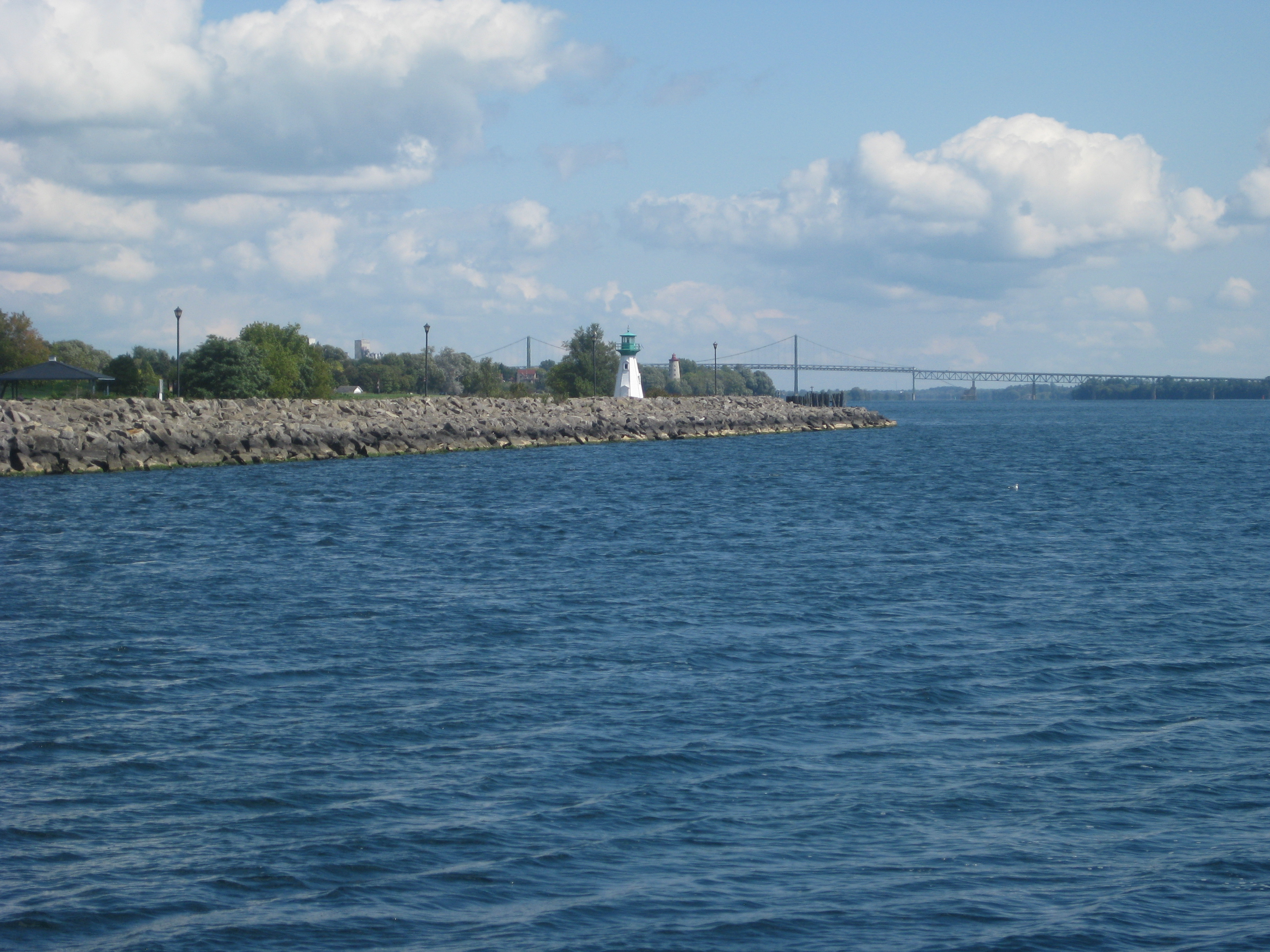
View of Prescott's shoreline looking east towards the Galop Rapids. Fort Wellington was built to protect the head of the Galop Rapids.

Fort Wellington was commissioned by the British government during the War of 1812 to protect the head of the Galop Rapids in the St. Lawrence River. Prior to the creation of the St. Lawrence Seaway in the 1950s, a series of rapids ran downriver from Prescott to Montreal. Shipping of freight and passengers on regular lake ships was impossible through these rapids, and so freight and passengers who travelled downriver to Prescott from Kingston would be "forwarded" to smaller bateaux which could travel through the rapids. Likewise, freight travelling upriver from Montreal would be unloaded from smaller bateaux and loaded onto larger lake ships for carriage upriver. At the time, the Rideau Canal had not been constructed and the colony's road network was primitive. The only means of shipping heavy cargo and passengers into the Great Lakes from the lower St. Lawrence was by way of Prescott.

Since Prescott is located only a mile from the town of Ogdensburg, New York, it was especially vulnerable to military action by the United States Army. As a communications hub upon which the rest of the colony of Upper Canada relied, the town had to be defended. The fort was built on land owned by Major Edward Jessup, a prominent Loyalist from Connecticut who founded Prescott in 1784.

== History ==
=== Initial construction and the War of 1812 ===
The fort was built with earthen ramparts reinforced with horizontal frieze pickets. The ramparts were surrounded on the east, west and south facades by a dry ditch with a vertical palisade fence and a glacis. A masonry gate on the north facade of the fort was the only entryway. Inside the fort, timber buildings were constructed and designed to be concealed behind the ramparts. Casemates were tunnelled into the inside of the ramparts and these were used for storage.

The fort's main armament was a pair of 24-pounder iron cannon mounted on the southeast and southwest corners of the ramparts. These guns had a range which permitted them to fire on buildings across the river in Ogdensburg, New York, and consequently any ship or boat passing the fort was (and is) within range of these guns. Smaller guns defended other points on the ramparts walls.

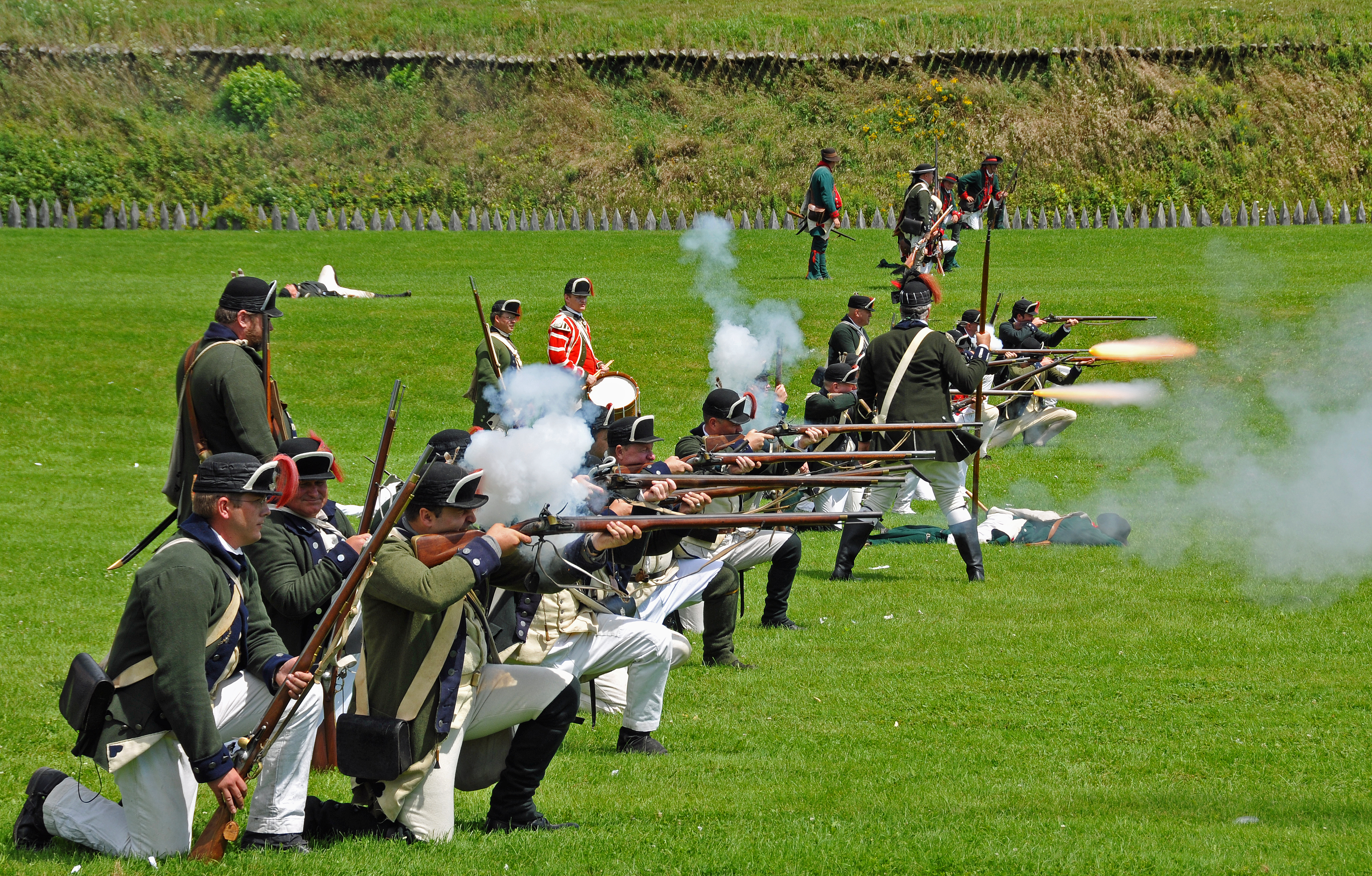
Historical reenactors depicting a War of 1812 era skirmish at Fort Wellington.

Unusually for a fortification of its age in Ontario, Fort Wellington was never directly attacked. The military historian Robert D. Bradford later argued that, despite a naturally defensible position, it is unlikely that the fort's palisade could have stood up to bombardment, and that the main value of the fort's presence was in holding territory and providing a sense of security to the local civilian population.

During the War of 1812, Prescott remained an important communications point. Fort Wellington served as the rallying point for the local militia, and in early 1813 was also a base of operations for members of the Glengarry Light Infantry under the command of Lieutenant Colonel George Macdonell. On February 22, 1813, Macdonell led the approximately 500 men under his command in a drill exercise on the frozen St. Lawrence River. The British troops then streamed across the frozen river to attack the town of Ogdensburg, where they destroyed the military barracks and four American ships frozen in the ice, and returned to Prescott with significant amounts of food, ammunition, cannon and prisoners. This winter raid was in direct response to prior raids on Gananoque and Elizabethtown (present-day Brockville, Ontario) by Captain Benjamin Forsyth and soldiers of the U.S. 1st Rifle Regiment, who in February 1813 were based in Ogdensburg.

The fort's guns and garrison again saw action in November, when an American army under General Wilkinson descended the St. Lawrence River in an attempt to capture Montreal. Wilkinson feared Fort Wellington's guns enough that he unloaded his army upriver from Ogdensburg and marched it through the town at night while his boats slipped past, empty of passengers.

Once Wilkinson passed Ogdensburg, Prescott's garrison followed along the King's Highway (the modern Highway 2) along the north shore of the river. On November 11, 1813, the two armies fought the Battle of Crysler's Farm, near present-day Morrisburg, Ontario. Wilkinson's army was decisively defeated by a much smaller British and Canadian force, and retreated across the river to Fort Covington, New York. The attack on Montreal was abandoned, and Canada saved.

The fortifications were completed in 1814, coinciding with the peace negotiations which resulted in the Treaty of Ghent. Following the war, the garrison was reduced due to lack of necessity during peacetime. Gradually, the fortifications were allowed to deteriorate, and the fort was abandoned by the British army in 1833.

=== Abandonment ===
The end of the War of 1812 in December 1814 led to a rapid demobilization of British fortications in Upper Canada. Fort Wellington was quickly abandoned, although the land itself remained the property of the Board of Ordnance of the British Crown. Built quickly, the buildings and casemates inside the fort deteriorated.

=== Construction of the second fort ===
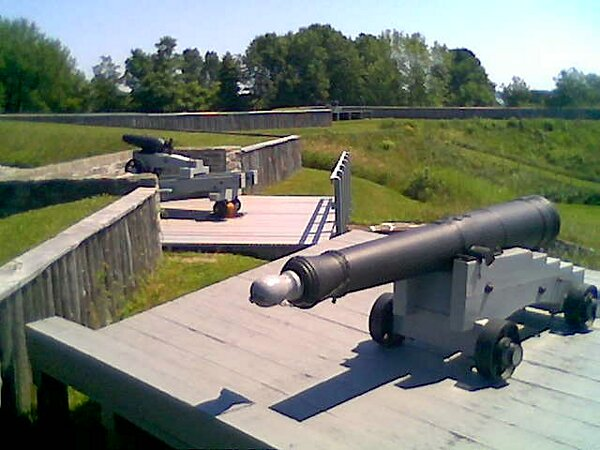
A 12-pounder gun was placed at the northwest corner over the main gate of the fort in 1839.

In 1837, political dissidents in the Canadas launched a rebellion, including at the City of York (modern Toronto). With few British regular soldiers in the Colony, the Upper Canadian militia was quickly mobilized and Fort Wellington became the main depot for the militia in the Prescott area. The Crown commissioned a reconstruction of the fort using the original earthworks from 1813, and work commenced in the spring of 1838.

The buildings in the modern Fort Wellington survive from this period. The three-storey stone blockhouse was completed in 1839, as was the officer's quarters, latrine, cookhouse, and guardhouse. The 1839 improvements were in response to Hunters' Lodges seizure of the steamer Sir Robert Peel The original 24-pounder cannon first installed in 1813 were remounted on the southeast and southwest corners of the ramparts, as were two 12-pounder cannon on the northeast and northwest corners, a 36-pounder carronade over the gate, and two 14-inch mortars on the parade behind the southern rampart facade. In addition, an enclosed, stone caponiere was constructed in the dry ditch outside the palisade on the south facade. This was accessed through a tunnel from the interior of the fort.

=== Battle of the Windmill ===
After their defeat at York in the autumn of 1837, many of the Upper Canadian political dissidents fled to the United States. Among the citizens of the northern states of New York, Pennsylvania, Ohio and Michigan, these exiles found much sympathy and anti-British sentiment. Overnight, an army of sympathizers was organized. Calling themselves Hunter Patriots, they combined a neo-Masonic organizational structure with militant republicanism. Their propaganda machine convinced many Americans in the northern states that the citizens of Upper and Lower Canada were being oppressed by undemocratic British government, and were simply waiting for the intervention of liberty-loving American sympathizers.

Early in 1838, these hunters conducted insurgent operations in the Niagara Region, the area around Windsor and Amherstburg, Ontario and on Pelee Island. At one point, Navy Island, upriver from Niagara Falls, which was and remains Canadian territory, was occupied by a sizeable army of Patriot Hunters.

Tensions escalated when a force of Upper Canada militia seized a Hunter vessel, Caroline, in the Niagara River and burned it. Although officially opposed to the actions of the Patriot Hunters, the United States government soon found that most of its local agents and officials were either themselves members of the Lodges or complicit in their activities. For example, the New York State militia "lost" several cannons from its armouries in New York State and Michigan.

In November, 1838, a force of Patriot Hunters met at Sackets Harbor, New York and then travelled downriver on civilian vessels to Ogdensburg. They planned to seize the militia strongpoint at Fort Wellington and organize the disaffected citizens of Upper Canada into a Patriot-led insurgent army with the goal of deposing the British Governor of the Colony.

The Patriots' attempt to land at Prescott proved farcical. The local militia commander had been warned that trouble was afoot. When a Hunter vessel attempted to land early on the morning of 12 November at a wharf in Prescott, it was challenged and fired upon by alert Canadian militiamen. Attempting to withdraw, it and a companion vessel ran aground off Ogdensburg. Later in the morning, both vessels were freed and drifted downriver, past the incredulous sentries at Fort Wellington, and landed two miles downriver at Windmill Point, a promontory on the north shore of the St. Lawrence River. Windmill Point was the site of a hamlet called Newport and—most prominently—a tall, stone windmill. The Hunters disembarked and occupied the village and windmill. Their commanding officer returned by ship to Ogdensburg, promising that a larger force of Hunters would be embarked there and brought as reinforcements. He left a Swedish immigrant named Nils von Schoultz in command at the windmill.

With no regular British forces in the area, the local commander of the Upper Canadian militia summoned all available militiamen in Grenville, Leeds and Dundas Counties and began preparations to assault. He established a cordon of militiamen around Newport and Windmill Point. He also opened communications with the American military commander at Ogdensburg, who had arrived on the scene and had begun to restore order in that town.

A small American naval vessel arrived to cooperate with an even smaller British naval vessel, HMSV Experiment, in isolating Windmill Point from reinforcement. During the course of this blockade, a civilian vessel, United States, commandeered by the Hunters attempted to run the blockade and was fired on by Experiment. In what may have been the last naval action on the St. Lawrence River, the helmsman of the Patriot Hunter vessel was decapitated by a British cannonball, and the Hunters withdrew into Ogdensburg Harbour, where their vessel was interned.

Meanwhile, sufficient numbers of militia and a small party of British regulars had arrived in Prescott to allow an assault on Windmill Point, and this was attempted on 13 November. The militia were successful in driving in the Patriot outposts and capturing many of the outlying farm buildings, but the Hunters held the windmill and some of the surrounding buildings. Casualties on both sides had been significant, and the British commander elected to await regular reinforcements. He reestablished the cordon around the Point while the main body of militia withdrew to Fort Wellington.

Regular reinforcements arrived on 14 November in the form of British regulars of the Royal Artillery and the 83rd Regiment as well as Royal Marines from the Royal Navy facility at Kingston. Having appreciated that the windmill structure would be impervious to small arms and light artillery fire, heavy artillery was brought by ship from Kingston. A detachment of Highlanders from the 93rd Regiment arrived from Montreal just as the second assault was about to begin on 16 November. More small naval gunboats also arrived to shell the Hunters from the river while the United States Navy kept the rest of the Hunters bottled up on the American side.

During the second assault, the Hunters were quickly driven from the outlying buildings in Newport and forced back into the windmill itself. The heavy artillery opened fire against this building, but were unable to penetrate the thick stone walls. Nonetheless, Von Schoultz and his men now realized that the Upper Canadians were not going to join the insurgency and that the promised reinforcements from Ogdensburg had more pressing matters to attend to safely across the border. Surrounded by wounded men, running short of supplies, ammunition and food, Von Schoultz surrendered unconditionally. The survivors were taken to Fort Henry in Kingston, where they were tried. Von Schoultz and several others were convicted and hanged, while the rest were either pardoned or transported to Australia.

=== 1839 to 1923 ===
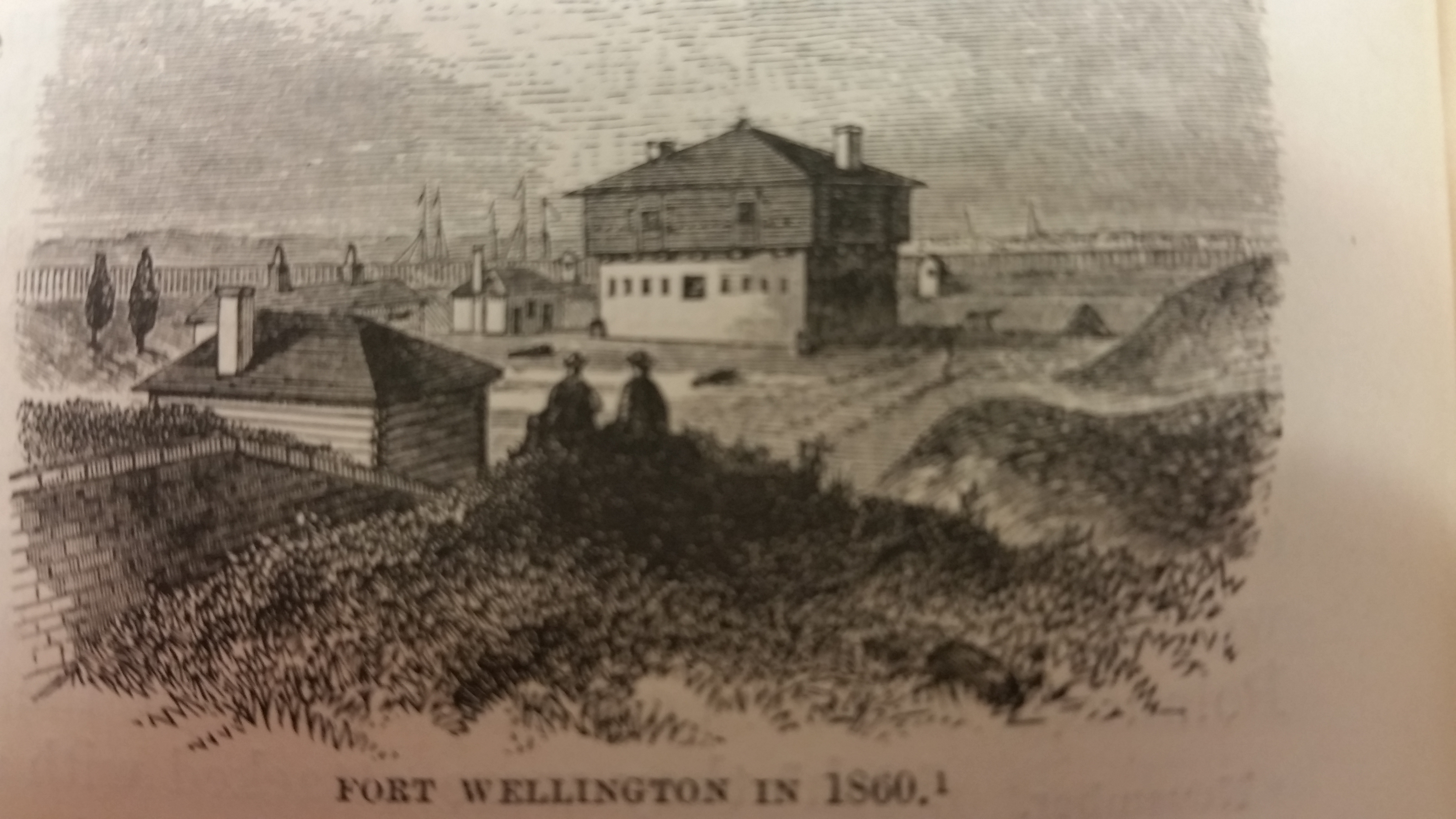
Fort Wellington in 1860.

Fort Wellington retained a regular garrison of British soldiers after the Rebellion. Visitors today can see the Fort restored to its condition in 1846, when the garrison comprised a modest detachment of Royal Artillery and a company of riflemen from the Royal Canadian Rifle Regiment.

This Regiment was composed of veterans of the British Army who volunteered to serve in the border fortifications in Canada. Because of the close proximity of the United States, the British garrison in Canada suffered from high rates of desertion. British deserters who could reach the United States were not deported back to Canada. The Army's solution was to only recruit veterans into the Royal Canadian Rifle Regiment, offer them a better rate of pay as well as pension benefits and the possibility of land grants upon the completion of their service. Consistent with the Duke of Wellington's suggestion that light infantry and rifle units would be most useful in Canada, the Regiment was also raised as an elite, rifle-armed unit.

The task of the Fort's garrison was to occupy the Fort and prevent it from being seized by surprise by insurgents or other belligerents. The Fort's main purpose was to hold the military stores of the Upper Canadian militia for the region.

The British Army left Fort Wellington in 1863, when the Fort became the sole responsibility of the militia. It was a regular site of militia operations, and was garrisoned during the Fenian Raids of 1866.

During the First World War, the Fort was used as a depot for military personnel travelling between Toronto, Ottawa, and Montreal. Prescott was the terminus of the Canadian Pacific Railway line from Ottawa, and this was the point where travellers from the north joined the main railway line between Toronto and Montreal. Many Canadian soldiers on their way to Europe stayed temporarily at the Fort.

=== Establishment of a National Historic Site ===
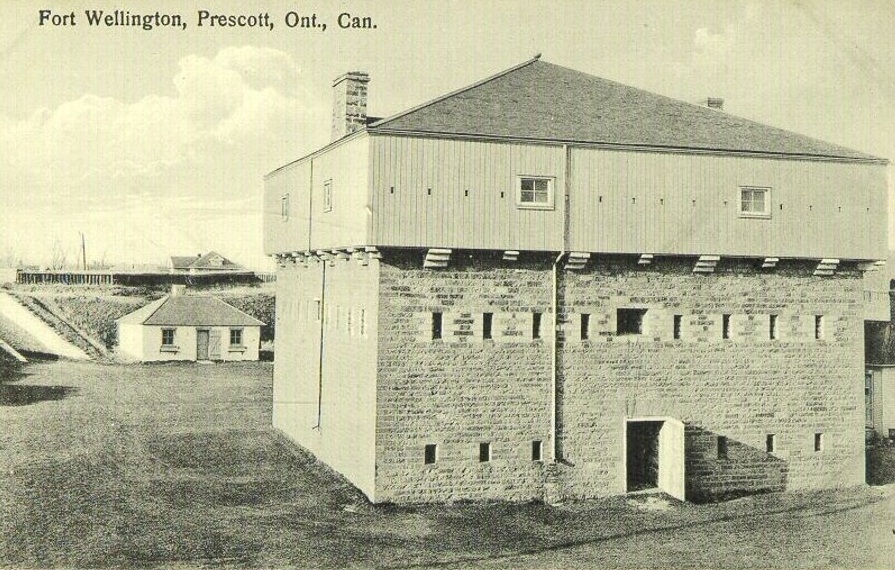
A postcard of Fort Wellington, c. 1930, several years after it was named National Historic Site of Canada.

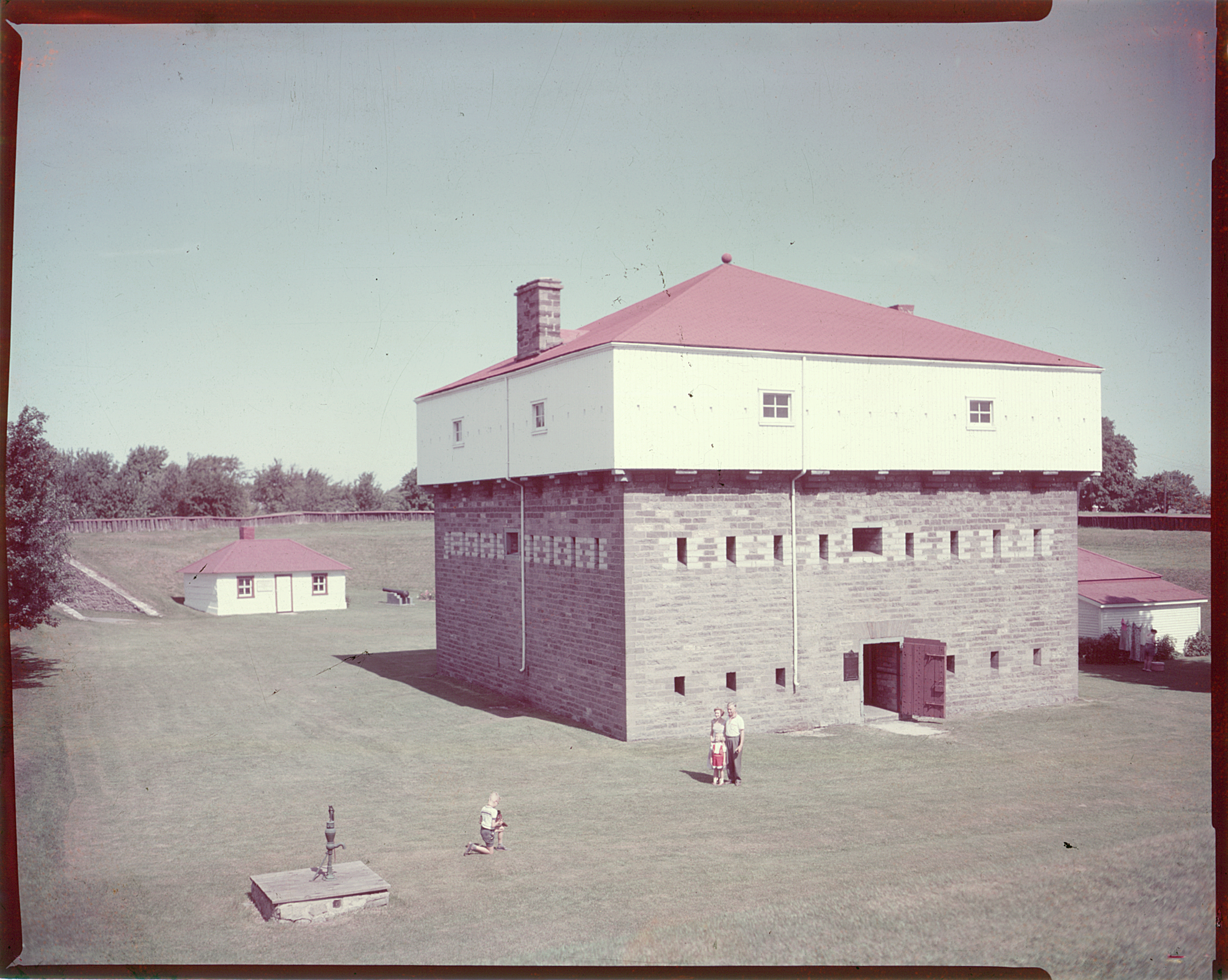
Fort Wellington, Prescott, 1953

On 30 January 1920, Fort Wellington was named as a National Historic Site of Canada. In 1923, the Fort was transferred from the Ministry of Militia to the Dominion Parks Branch, the national park service now called Parks Canada. It operates Fort Wellington National Historic Site, as well as the windmill at Windmill Point, itself designated Battle of the Windmill National Historic Site.

Like all Parks Canada National Historic Sites, Fort Wellington has a series of "Commemorative Integrity Statements" that state its cultural significance. They are:

1. It was the main post for the defence of the communication line between Montreal and Kingston during the War of 1812;
2. At this place troops assembled for the attack on and defeat of the forces at Ogdensburg, New York, 22 February 1813;
3. When rebellion threatened Upper Canada, the fort again assumed an important defensive role;
4. It was the assembly point for the troops that repelled the invasion at Windmill Point, November 1838.

During the summer, Fort Wellington is open daily from the Victoria Day weekend until Labour Day (But closed on Tuesdays and Wednesdays in May, June, September and October). The buildings are restored, and uniformed guides conduct tours of the fortifications and buildings, including the storerooms and barracks in the blockhouse. A military museum is located on the third floor of the blockhouse. A new Visitor Centre was completed in 2012 and showcases a gunboat wreck along with exhibits about the fort's history.

Battle of the Windmill NHS is also open during the summer months, and visitors can climb the interior staircase to enjoy the building's commanding views of the river.

== Legacy ==
On 28 June 1985 Canada Post issued 'Fort Wellington, Ont.' one of the 20 stamps in the "Forts Across Canada Series" (1983 & 1985). The stamps are perforated 12½ x 13 and were printed by Ashton-Potter Limited based on the designs by Rolf P. Harder.
