= Edward Jessup III =

Upper Canada politician

Member of the Legislative Assembly of Upper Canada for Grenville
- In office 1830–1831
- Preceded by: George Longley
- Succeeded by: Hiram Norton

Personal details
- Born: 1801 Augusta Township, Upper Canada
- Died: September 1831 (aged 29–30) Prescott, Ontario
- Relatives: Edward Jessup (grandfather); Edward Jessup, Jr. (father); Hamilton Dibble Jessup (brother)
- Occupation: Farmer, Militiaman, Politician

Military service
- Allegiance: Upper Canada
- Branch/service: Canadian militia
- Years of service: 1822-1831
- Rank: Lieutenant; Captain
- Unit: Grenville Militia

Edward Jessup (1801 – September 1831) was a farmer and political figure in Upper Canada.

He was born in Upper Canada in 1801, the son of Edward Jessup, Jr. and the grandson of Edward Jessup. He served in the local militia, becoming lieutenant in 1822 and captain in 1828. He was elected to the Legislative Assembly of Upper Canada representing Grenville in 1830. He died in Brockville while still in office in 1831.

His younger brother, Hamilton Dibble, represented Grenville in the Legislative Assembly of the Province of Canada.
