= Ilse Ipsen =

German-American mathematician

- Education: Kaiserslautern University of Technology, Pennsylvania State University
- Awards: Fellow of the Society for Industrial and Applied Mathematics, fellow of the American Association for the Advancement of Science
- Scientific career
- Fields: Numerical linear algebra
- Workplaces: North Carolina State University
- Thesis: Systolic Arrays for VLSI (1983)
- Doctoral advisor: Don Heller
- Website: https://ipsen.math.ncsu.edu/

Ilse Clara Franziska Ipsen is a German-American mathematician who works as a professor of mathematics at North Carolina State University. She was formerly associate director of the Statistical and Applied Mathematical Sciences Institute, a joint venture of North Carolina State and other nearby universities.

== Education and career ==
Ipsen earned a diploma from the Kaiserslautern University of Technology in 1977, and completed her doctorate from the Pennsylvania State University in 1983 under the supervision of Don Heller. Her dissertation was Systolic Arrays for VLSI and concerned Very Large Scale Integration hardware implementations of the systolic array parallel computing architecture.

After working at Yale University for ten years beginning in 1983, she joined North Carolina State University in 1993.

Ipsen is Founding Editor in Chief of the SIAM Book Series on Data Science.

== Book ==
Ipsen is the author of the book Numerical Matrix Analysis: Linear Systems and Least Squares (SIAM, 2009), an introductory graduate textbook on the sensitivity analysis of computations in linear algebra.

== Recognition ==
In 2011, she became a fellow of the Society for Industrial and Applied Mathematics "for contributions to numerical linear algebra, perturbation theory, and applications." She was elected as a fellow of the American Association for the Advancement of Science in 2018.
