= Insall =

People with the surname Insall include:

- Donald Insall (1926–2026), British architect, conservationist and author
- Gilbert Stuart Martin Insall (1894–1972), British pilot in the Royal Flying Corps and Royal Air Force
- John Insall (1930–2000), pioneering English orthopaedic surgeon who spent most of his career in the United States
- Robert Insall (born 1965), British cell & computational biologist
