= Leeds County =

Former county in Ontario, Canada

Coordinates: 44°35′N 76°00′W

Leeds County is a historic county in the Canadian province of Ontario. The county was first surveyed in 1792 as one of the nineteen counties created by Sir John Graves Simcoe in preparation for the United Empire Loyalists to settle here. The county took its name from Francis Osborne, 5th Duke of Leeds; the "Leeds" of the Dukedom referred to Leeds in West Yorkshire, England and not for Leeds, Kent, England. In 1850, Leeds County merged with Grenville County to create the United Counties of Leeds and Grenville. This county was home to several townships as well as the city of Brockville.

== History ==
The original county was constituted in 1792, and was united with Frontenac County as an electoral district for the new Legislative Assembly of Upper Canada:

... which county is to bounded on the east by the westernmost line of the county of Grenvill, on the south by the river St. Lawrence, and on the west by the easternmost boundary line of the late township of Pittsburgh, running north until it intersects the Ottawa or Grand river, thence descending the said river until it meets the northwesternmost boundary of the county of Grenvill. The said county of Leeds is to comprehend all the islands in the said river St. Lawrence nearest the said county, in the whole or greater part fronting the same.

In 1798, the Parliament of Upper Canada withdrew parts of Leeds and Grenville to form Carleton County and the three counties together were constituted as Johnstown District, effective at the beginning of 1800. Leeds consisted of the following townships:

Organization of Leeds County (1800)

The townships of

- Elizabethtown
- Yonge and Escott
- Landsdowne
- Leeds
- Crosby
- Bastard
- Burgess
- Elmsley
- Kitley

In 1838, the parts of the townships of Burgess and Elmsley north of the Rideau Canal were withdrawn from Leeds and transferred to Lanark County.

When the Johnstown District was abolished in 1850, Leeds County was united with Grenville County to form the United Counties of Leeds and Grenville.

=== Municipal restructuring ===
- 1998:
  - The townships of Bastard, North Crosby, South Burgess, South Crosby and South Elmsley amalgamated to become Rideau Lakes Township.
  - The townships of Lansdowne, Leeds, and most of Escott (the southern portion) amalgamated to become Leeds and the Thousand Islands Township.
- 2001:
  - The townships of Elizabethtown and Kitley amalgamated to become Elizabethtown-Kitley Township.
  - The northern portions of Escott and Yonge Townships amalgamated to become Athens Township.
  - The southern portion of Yonge Township became Front of Yonge Township.

== See also ==
- List of Ontario census divisions
- List of townships in Ontario
- Leeds and Grenville County
- Brockville, Ontario
