= Willie Jessop =

American Fundamentalist Mormon leader

William Roy Jessop is a former leader and spokesman for the Fundamentalist Church of Jesus Christ of Latter-Day Saints (FLDS Church). Jessop should not be confused with William E. Jessop, the person Warren Jeffs designated as his successor to the presidency of the FLDS Church.

Jessop was a bodyguard during the tenure of FLDS Church president Warren Jeffs. After Jeffs' arrest and the April 2008 raids on the church's YFZ Ranch near Eldorado, Texas, Jessop became a frequent spokesman for the FLDS Church. In May 2008, Jessop wrote an open letter to United States president George W. Bush, requesting that he intervene against the removal of children from FLDS Church families.

In a January 2009 deposition, Jessop refused to answer 110 questions put to him on the grounds that doing so would violate his Fifth Amendment rights under the United States Constitution.

In February 2011, Jessop left the church and in April denounced Jeffs. After leaving the church, Jessop continues to live in Hildale, Utah. In October, a 25-year-old wife of Jeffs fleeing the church sought refuge in his house before being removed by law enforcement.

Jessop has been nicknamed "Willie the Thug", "Fat Willie", "Willie Doughnuts" and "King Willie" by disaffected FLDS Church members. He has been described by police as having "a passion for violence, weapons (legal and illegal) and explosives" and has been said to be "the most serious threat affiliated with the FLDS religion". Police have also suggested that Jessop attempted to intimidate witnesses during Warren Jeffs' 2007 trial.

Willie Jessop's reversal and denouncement of Warren Jeffs occurred after he discovered incriminating evidence (documents and audio recordings) that proved Jeffs was guilty of crimes he had been charged with and subsequently found guilty of in 2011 (namely accessory to rape and rape of minors). Jessop was shocked and disgusted to discover that the prophet he had been protecting had in fact been using his status to facilitate group sex with young girls. Jessop received further confirmation after interviewing some of Jeffs' wives.

After publicly denouncing Warren Jeffs in 2011, Willie Jessop was subject to discrimination, harassment and burglary by FLDS members and sect leaders. He later won a lawsuit against them in court. In March 2015, he appeared on the Oprah Winfrey Show to reveal the truth in his change of allegiance, as well as open up about the aftermath that followed.

== Notes ==
- John Quinones and Harry Phillips, "Willie Jessop: Purported Frontman at Texas Polygamy Compound", ABC News, 2008-04-18
