= Charles Minshall Jessop =

English mathematician (1861–1939)

Charles Minshall Jessop (1861 – March 9, 1939) was a mathematician at the University of Durham working in algebraic geometry.

== Selected publications ==
- Jessop, Charles Minshall (1894), The Elements of Applied Mathematics including Kinetics, Statics, and Hydrostatics, G. Bell & Sons
- Jessop, Charles Minshall (1916), "Quartic surfaces with singular points", Nature, vol. 98, Cambridge University Press, pp. 367–368, Bibcode:1917Natur..98..367G, doi:10.1038/098367a0, hdl:2027/coo.31924062545383, ISBN 978-1-112-28262-1, S2CID 3966763
- Jessop, C. M. (2001) [1903], A treatise on the line complex, Providence, R.I.: American Mathematical Society, ISBN 978-0-8218-2913-4, MR 0247995, archived from the original on March 3, 2016
