= Prescott, Ontario =

Town in Ontario, Canada

Prescott
- Town (single-tier)
- Town of Prescott
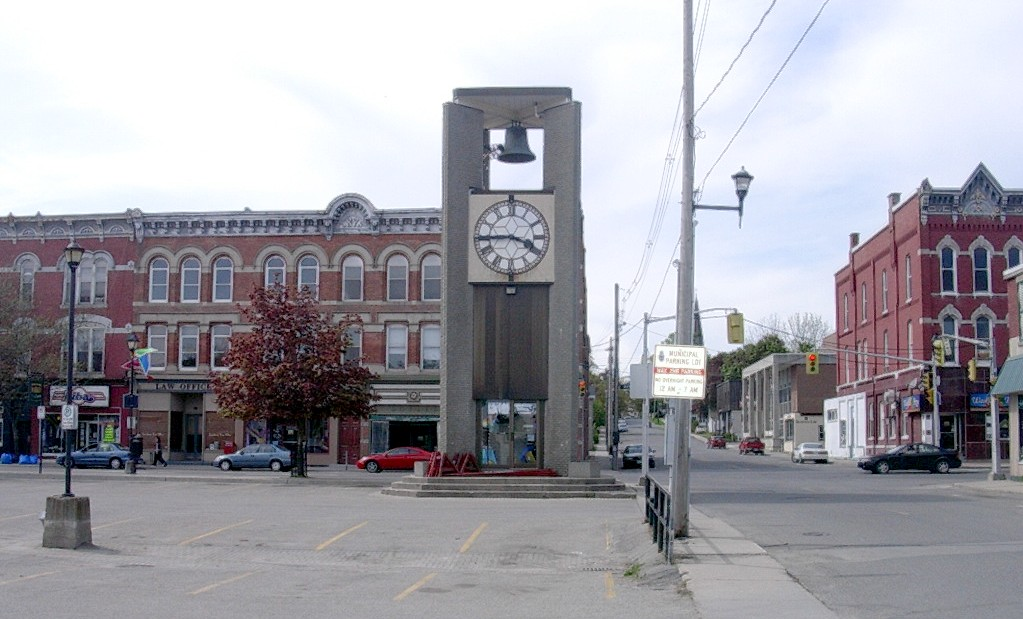

- Location within United Counties of Leeds and Grenville Location within Southern Ontario
- Coordinates: 44°43′N 75°31′W
- Country: Canada
- Province: Ontario
- County: Leeds and Grenville (Independent)
- Settled: 1787
- Incorporated: 1850

Government
  - Mayor: Gauri Shankar
  - Federal riding: Leeds—Grenville—Thousand Islands and Rideau Lakes
  - Prov. riding: Leeds—Grenville—Thousand Islands and Rideau Lakes

Area
  - Land: 4.94 km^{2} (1.91 sq mi)

Population (2021)
  - Total: 4,078
  - Density: 826/km^{2} (2,140/sq mi)
- Time zone: UTC-5 (EST)
  - Summer (DST): UTC-4 (EDT)
- Postal code: K0E
- Area code: 613
- Website: www.prescott.ca

Prescott is a town on the north shore of the Saint Lawrence River in the province of Ontario, Canada. The town is a single-tier municipality located within the United Counties of Leeds and Grenville census division. In 2021, it had a population of 4,078. The Ogdensburg–Prescott International Bridge, 5 kilometres (3.1 mi) east of Prescott at Johnstown, crosses the Canada–United States border and connects the town with the city of Ogdensburg, New York.

Prescott was founded in the early 19th century by Edward Jessup, a Loyalist soldier during the American Revolution, who named the village after a former Governor-in-Chief, Robert Prescott. Before 1834, the town was a part of Augusta township; however, in that year, the town became a police village and severed its ties with Augusta. The land here was ideal for settlement during the 18th and 19th centuries as it was situated between Montreal and Kingston along the St. Lawrence River at the head of the rapids.

== History ==
=== French period ===
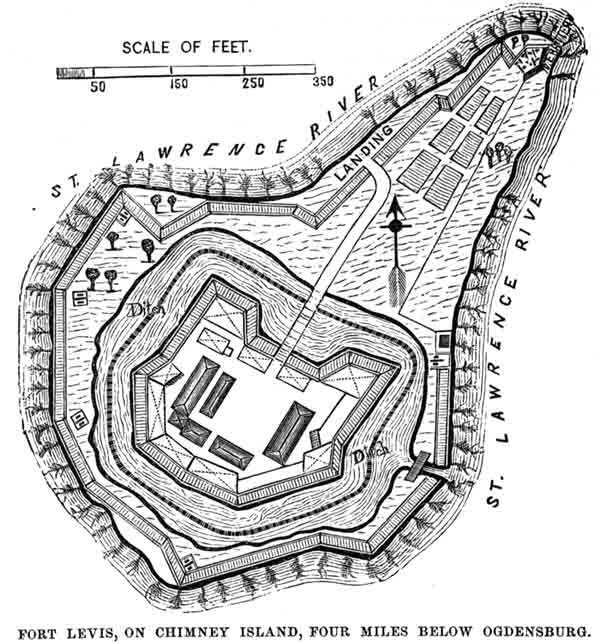
1760 French map depicting Fort de Levis near Prescott, Ontario

Before the arrival of Europeans to the Grenville County area, it was inhabited by the St. Lawrence Iroquois. The French began occupation of the area in the late 17th century, starting with a supply depot and fortified outpost named La Galette en route to Fort Frontenac (Kingston), which was built in the 1670s. Some sources place La Galette at Prescott, while others place it at neighbouring Johnstown. Fort de La Présentation was later built in 1749 on the other side of the river, at Lighthouse Point near present-day Ogdensburg, New York. This was soon abandoned in favour of Fort Lévis, which was located on Isle Royale (Chimney Island) in the centre of the river.

The area became a battleground during the 1754−1763 French and Indian War between Britain and France, as both parties wanted to control what was a strategic stretch of the Saint Lawrence River. This led to the 1760 Battle of the Thousand Islands when a 10,000-strong British–Iroquois force besieged the French at Fort Lévis. Despite a spirited defence by the 300-strong French garrison, the British took the fort after an extensive artillery bombardment. Afterward, the British occupied the fort, renaming it Fort William Augustus, though they soon abandoned it in favour of the older Fort de La Présentation, which they renamed Fort Oswegatchie. The ruins of Fort Lévis, and the island the fort stood on, were later submerged during the creation of the Saint Lawrence Seaway.

=== Arrival of the Loyalists ===
British settlement in the area began with a group of United Empire Loyalists led by Edward Jessup. During the American Revolutionary War, Jessup fought with the King's Royal Regiment of New York and later led his own Loyal Rangers, which served in a defensive capacity along the Saint Lawrence. After the war, members of the regiment were resettled in what would later become Eastern Ontario. Jessup, his son, and their followers settled in Augusta and Edwardsburgh townships. Johnstown in Edwardsburgh Township was an initial landing place and was the town site to be settled in 1789. In 1792, it was briefly the administrative seat for the Eastern District before a more permanent administration was established at New Johnstown (now Cornwall); later, it was the seat of the eponymous Johnstown District before again losing its position, this time to Elizabethtown (Brockville). In 1796, provisions of the Jay Treaty led to a British evacuation from Fort Oswegatchie, as the land had legally become a part of the United States. Within months, this area was soon occupied by American settlers, who named it Ogdensburgh (later Ogdensburg) after Samuel Ogden, a prominent landowner and speculator.

=== Fort Wellington ===
In 1810, Jessup and his son laid out a townsite within Augusta Township near Johnstown, which they named Prescott in honour of General Robert Prescott, who had been governor-in-chief in The Canadas and had participated in British campaigns in the area, being the aide-de-camp tasked with delivering the news of the fall of Fort Lévis fifty years earlier. Jessup began to take the first steps toward building a concentrated settlement by constructing a log schoolhouse along with a teacher's residence, which was built from stone. With the outbreak of the War of 1812, American troops began using Ogdensburg and Fort Oswegatchie as a base to raid settlements in Upper Canada. Soon, the two Jessup home plots were expropriated by the British Army for use as barracks. The army also later constructed a purpose-built fort, which was named Fort Wellington. The fort served its intended purpose of impeding American use of the Saint Lawrence for military purposes and was never directly attacked. Following the end of the war, the fort was soon abandoned and began to deteriorate.

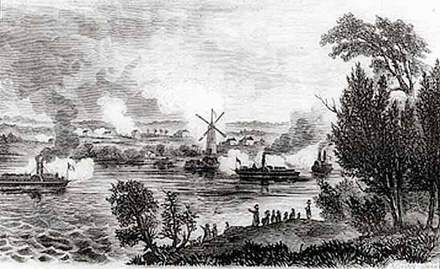
A woodcut depicting the Battle of the Windmill

During the Upper Canada Rebellion, Fort Wellington was repaired and reactivated. It became the main supply base for government forces in the region, which made it a tempting military target. In 1838, a group of Hunter Patriots attempted to land at Prescott, hoping to use Fort Wellington as a beachhead for an invasion of Upper Canada. They were repelled by the town militia and fled downriver, then landed at the small hamlet of Newport, which afforded them a strong defensive position dominated by a large stone windmill. The Battle of the Windmill ensued, leading to the defeat of the Hunter Patriot group.

=== Industry ===
RCA operated a television assembly plant in Prescott, established in 1953 for the Canadian market. It was closed in March 1997.

=== Transport ===
Prescott's harbour developed considerably in the early 19th century, supporting the growing Great Lakes shipping industry. It became notable for its freight forwarding businesses, as local forwarders shuttled Great Lakes freight between Prescott and Montreal. This was commemorated at the Forwarders' Museum, which was housed in a building originally constructed in the 1820s by local forwarder William Gilkinson.

By the mid-19th century, however, the forwarding industry began to decline. Navigability of the Saint Lawrence had improved, allowing more Great Lakes ships to reach Montreal directly. Soon, Upper Canada experienced a railway boom, which provided competition for the maritime shipping industry. The Bytown and Prescott Railway began operating in 1854, connecting Prescott to Bytown (now Ottawa). This was followed by the construction of the Grand Trunk Railway mainline between Toronto and Montreal, which connected to the Bytown and Prescott Railway at Prescott Junction. With parallel railway development occurring across the river in Ogdensburg, railway car ferry services began between the two towns, which later evolved into the Canadian Pacific Car and Passenger Transfer Company. Freight traffic declined abruptly during the Great Depression, though a recovery took place after the outbreak of the Second World War. Traffic volumes slowly declined again after the war, and ferry service ended entirely in the early 1970s.

=== Project Jericho ===
Project Jericho, which was one of the largest and most highly publicized sexual abuse investigations in Canada, took place in the 1980s–1990s and focused on a case of multi-generational child sexual abuse in Prescott, which was "staggering in its reach and its routine violation of hundreds of victims." When the investigation concluded, the total victim count was 275 (including 113 adults who disclosed that they were abused as children), and the total perpetrator count was 119. The case was sensationalized as an example of Satanic ritual abuse, though it was never linked to a satanic cult, but rather, "a group of adults of limited intelligence who lived on the margins of society." Many of both the perpetrators and the victims were developmentally disabled. By 1994, of the cases which went to trial, the conviction rate was 91%. However, the Prescott case bears many similarities to other instances of "Satanic Panic" that happened in the 1980s and 1990s.

== Demographics ==
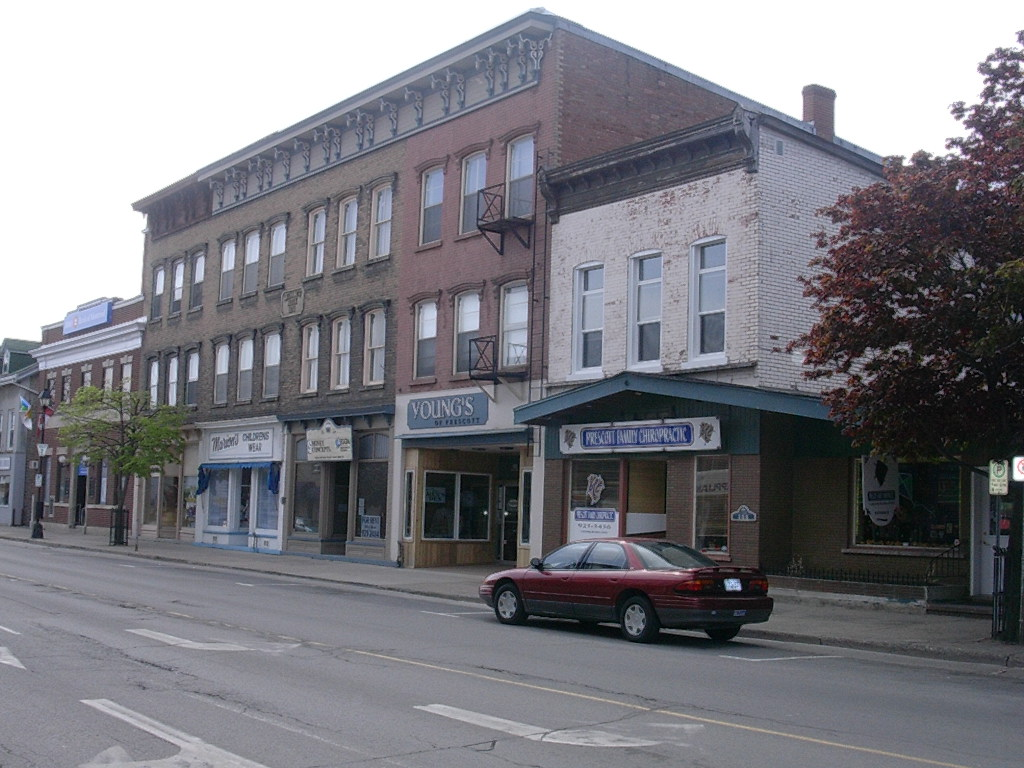
King Street, Prescott

In the 2021 Census of Population conducted by Statistics Canada, Prescott had a population of 4,078 living in 1,889 of its 1,993 total private dwellings, a change of −3.4% from its 2016 population of 4,222. With a land area of 4.94 km^{2} (1.91 sq mi), it had a population density of 825.5/km^{2} (2,138.1/sq mi) in 2021.

Canada census – Prescott community profile

	2021	2016	2011
Population	4,078 (-3.4% from 2016)	4,222 (-1.4% from 2011)	4,284 (+2.5% from 2006)
Land area	4.94 km^{2} (1.91 sq mi)	4.93 km^{2} (1.90 sq mi)	4.95 km^{2} (1.91 sq mi)
Population density	826.0/km^{2} (2,139/sq mi)	856.2/km^{2} (2,218/sq mi)	865.3/km^{2} (2,241/sq mi)
Median age	49.6 (M: 48.4, F: 51.2)	50.4 (M: 48.5, F: 52.1)
Private dwellings	1,993 (total) 1,889 (occupied)	2,103 (total) 2,016 (occupied)	2,063 (total)
Median household income	$61,200	$46,293

References: 2021 2016 2011

Historical census populations – Prescott, Ontario

Year	Pop.	±%
1921	2,636	—
1931	2,984	+13.2%
1941	3,223	+8.0%
1951	3,518	+9.2%
1956	4,920	+39.9%
1961	5,366	+9.1%

Year	Pop.	±%
1966	5,176	−3.5%
1971	5,165	−0.2%
1976	4,975	−3.7%
1981	4,670	−6.1%
1986	4,583	−1.9%
1991	4,512	−1.5%

Year	Pop.	±%
1996	4,480	−0.7%
2001	4,228	−5.6%
2006	4,180	−1.1%
2011	4,284	+2.5%
2016	4,222	−1.4%
2021	4,078	−3.4%

Population counts are not adjusted for boundary changes.
Source: Statistics Canada

Mother tongue (2021):

- English as first language: 93.3%
- French as first language: 3.1%
- English and French as first language: 0.7%
- Other as first language: 2.7%

== St Lawrence Shakespeare Festival ==
The St Lawrence Shakespeare Festival (SLSF) runs annually in Prescott, Ontario, in July and August, attracting thousands of audience members each season. SLSF contracts professional actors through the Canadian Actors Equity Association, is a member of PACT (the Professional Association of Canadian Theatres), and is a member of the Shakespeare Theatre Association. The offerings of the Festival are based on two mainstage shows that run from mid-July to mid-August (often, but not always, both plays by Shakespeare) as well as additional productions that are presented in shorter runs of fewer performances.

== Cemeteries ==
Prescott contains two cemeteries, Prescott Cemetery (known as Sandy Hill) and St. Mark's Roman Catholic Cemetery. Prescott Cemetery is located along Edward Street across from South Grenville District High School and is one of the oldest burying grounds in the area. The land for this cemetery was given to the town in 1830, in Edward Jessup III's will, which stated the area then known as Sand Hill was to become a “burial ground for the different churches in the town of Prescott.”. Prior to becoming the town's cemetery, the area was already used as a burial ground for the Jessup family. The earliest-known burial was that of Susannah Jessup's father, who died in 1798. Edward Jessup I, the original recipient of the land here, was also buried in the cemetery early in 1816. Along the south side of the front of the cemetery are many unmarked graves of pioneers who died of cholera. In 1929, the cemetery was expanded, and the entrance gates were added. In 1967, the stone steps leading up the hill to the Jessup family graves were placed. This cemetery is still in use today.

The Roman Catholics of Prescott were initially buried in Prescott Cemetery, which had a reserved area specifically for Roman Catholic burials. During the 1850s, the Roman Catholic community desired to have their own cemetery. In 1859, a local reverend bought land from a resident for $1 for this specific purpose. Additional such land was purchased in 1875. This cemetery is located north of the 401 on the west side of County Road 18 and is known as St. Mark's Cemetery. The older, back section of the cemetery was blessed in 1860, and the newer part in 1935. The earliest legible tombstone in the cemetery dates to before the land was purchased and belonged to Thomas Allen, who died in 1845. This cemetery is also currently still in use.

== Churches ==
Currently, Prescott contains six churches, all of which are still in operation. The town includes a Presbyterian, Anglican, Roman Catholic, United, Pentecostal and an Evangelist church. The Pentecostal church, called Seaway Christian Church, is located on Churchill Road and the Evangelist church, called Harvest Church, is located on Edward Street; services are currently held in these churches regularly.

St. Andrew's Presbyterian church is located on the corner of Centre and Dibble Street in Prescott. The first St. Andrew's Presbyterian, located on the same site as the current church, was constructed in 1821 and dedicated in 1822. The first church was a frame structure built on land donated by Susannah Jessup. This church was replaced in 1850 by a stone church, which burned in 1892. The present building that replaced it was constructed in 1893. Prior to this church, the Presbyterian congregation met in the schoolhouse at the corner of West and King Street. St. Andrew's is still in use today.

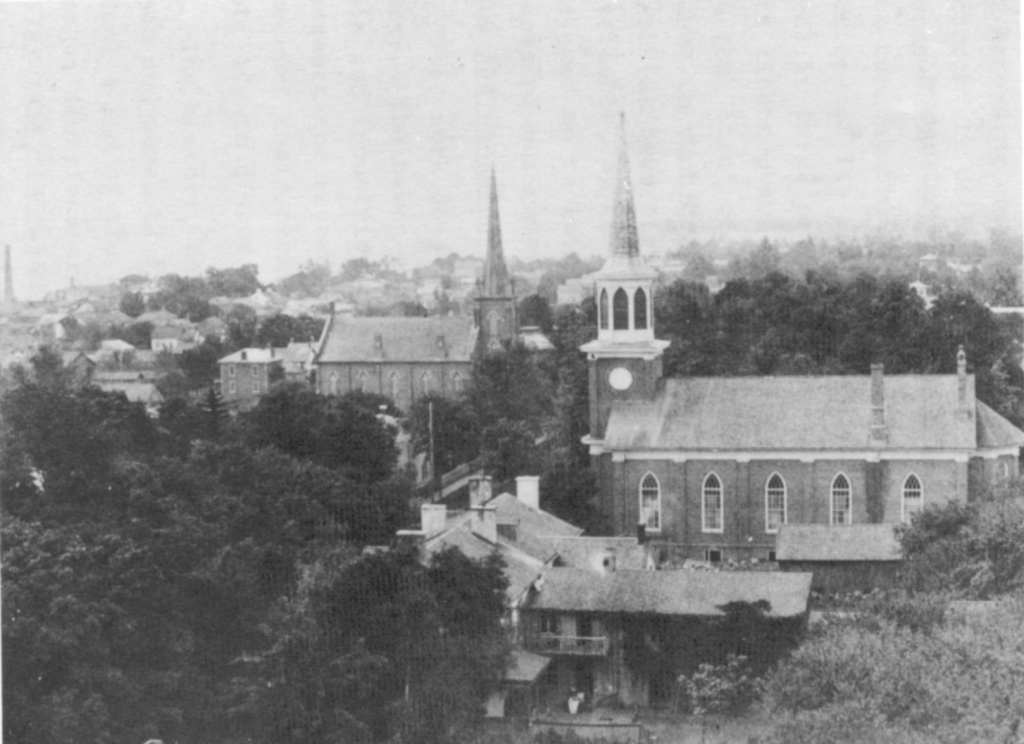
View of the original St. Paul's Church Prescott in 1890

St. John's Anglican Church in Prescott is located at the corner of James and Centre Street. The original St. John's Church on this site was a frame building constructed in 1821. The land for the church was donated by Susannah Jessup. The present church, which is still in use, was constructed in 1860 in a Gothic style to replace the original frame building. Some parts of the building are currently being renovated into apartments.

The Roman Catholic church, known as St. Mark's Roman Catholic Church, was built in the 1830s on land purchased from the Jessup family. Prior to its construction, a Roman Catholic priest served the area out of homes or community buildings. The present church stands in the exact location as the original St. Mark's on Dibble Street.

Currently, St. Paul's United Church is located on George Street; however, the former site of St. Paul's United Church was on Dibble Street, near St. Mark's church. Between 1854 and 1856, the Wesleyan Methodist congregation in Prescott planned, financed and erected their own church. This church became known as St. Paul's United Church. On July 28, 1979, the church was burned beyond repair and demolished. Sometime after the fire, a new St. Paul's United Church was built to serve the congregation; this school is still used today.

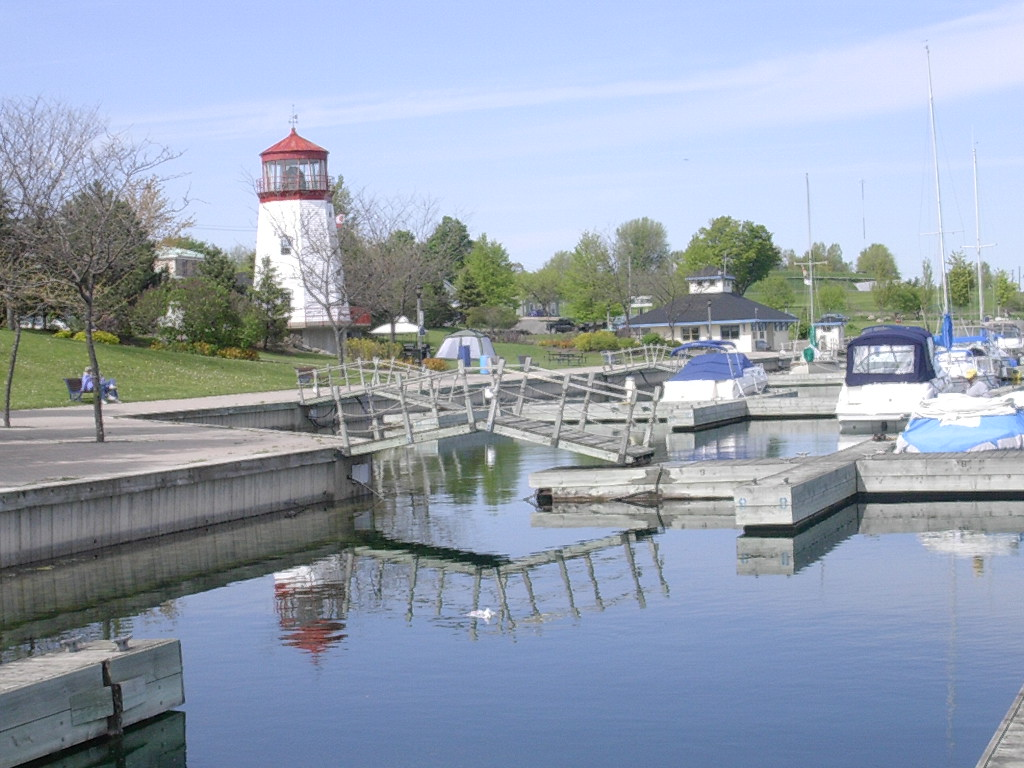
Prescott waterfront and marina

== Notable people ==
- Leo Boivin, ice hockey player and member of the Hockey Hall of Fame
- Jean Casselman Wadds, politician
- James Morrow Walsh, North-West Mounted Police officer
- Ben Hutton, ice hockey player
- Thomas Pope, mayor of Quebec City 1861–1863
- Alaine Chartrand, figure skater
- Sir Richard William Scott, politician and cabinet minister
- Bruce Hutchison, author and journalist
- Edward Jessup III, politician
- Hamilton Dibble Jessup, doctor and politician
- Earl Roche, professional hockey player
- John Philip Wiser, Canadian distiller
