= Loyal Rangers =

Jessup’s Loyal Rangers
- Active: 1781–1783
- Country: Great Britain
- Allegiance: British Army
- Branch: British provincial unit
- Type: Auxiliaries; Light infantry
- Role: Maneuver warfare Military intelligence Unconventional warfare
- Size: Battalion
- Garrison/HQ: Yamaska; Île aux Noix; Dutchman’s Point
- Nickname(s): Loyal Rangers
- Engagements: American Revolutionary War: Northern New York Campaign

Commanders
- Notable commanders: Major Edward Jessup

The Loyal Rangers, or Jessup's Loyal Rangers, was a volunteer regiment of Loyalists in the American Revolution.

The Corps was established on November 12, 1781 by the amalgamation of several smaller units, including the King's Loyal Americans. They were commanded by Major Edward Jessup.

Since they were formed late in the war they served mainly a defensive role, being stationed in Yamaska, Rivière-aux-Chiens, Île aux Noix, and Dutchman's Point in present-day North Hero, Vermont near Alburg.

After the close of the revolution the regiment was disbanded on December 24, 1783 and received grants of land from the British Crown in Upper Canada, now the province of Ontario, Canada: Edwardsburgh, Augusta, and part of Elizabethtown, now Brockville, on the St Lawrence River, as well as Ernestown, near Cataraqui (Kingston, Ontario).

== See also ==
- Upper Canada
