= Edward Jessup =

Loyalist in the American Revolution (1735–1816)

- Born: December 24, 1735; Stamford, Fairfield County, Connecticut Colony, British America
- Died: February 3, 1816 (aged 80); Prescott, Upper Canada
- Military career
- Allegiance: Kingdom of Great Britain
- Branch: British Army
- Service years: 1759–1795
- Rank: Lieutenant Colonel
- Units: New York Militia (1759–1760); King's Royal Regiment of New York (1776); King's Loyal Americans (1777–1780); Jessup's Rangers (1781–1783); Elizabethtown and Augusta Militia Battalion(1788–1795)
- Commands: Jessup’s Rangers (1781–83); Elizabethtown and Augusta Militia Battalion (1788–95)
- Conflicts: French and Indian War: Second Battle of Fort Ticonderoga; American Revolutionary War: Saratoga Campaign (POW); Northern New York Campaign
- Other work: Founder of Prescott

Edward Jessup (December 24, 1735 – February 3, 1816), together with his brother Ebenezer Jessup (July 1739 – 1818), was a large landowner in present-day New York State before the American Revolution, and later a soldier and political figure in Upper Canada, now the present-day Canadian province of Ontario, Canada.

== Early life ==
Edward Jessup was born in Stamford, Fairfield County, Connecticut Colony, British North America, British Empire, on December 24, 1735, and moved with his family, to Dutchess County, New York, in 1744.

== French and Indian War ==
In 1759, during the French and Indian War, Edward Jessup served as a Captain in the New York Militia under the leadership of British general Jeffery Amherst in the Lake Champlain region at the Battle of Ticonderoga. Following the war, in 1764, he moved with his brother, Ebenezer, to Albany County, New York, where they established a community, known as Jessup's Landing, on the Hudson River. Jessup was a recipient of a large land grant, from the British Crown, in the Adirondacks, around 500,000 acres (2,000 km^{2}). In addition, in 1771, the Jessup brothers purchased 1,150,000 acres (4,700 km^{2}) in Hamilton County, New York from the Mohawk people in the "Totten and Crossfield Purchase" for three pence an acre. The "Jessup River" and associated "Jessup River Wild Forest" in Hamilton County are named after the Jessup brothers.

== American Revolutionary War ==
In 1776, with other loyalists from this area, they joined Sir John Johnson's regiment, later forming their own corps, known as the King's Loyal Americans. They fought with Lieutenant General John Burgoyne at Saratoga and both brothers were taken prisoner. They were paroled and allowed to return to Quebec. In 1781, Edward Jessup was named head of a new provincial regiment known as the Loyal Rangers, or Jessup's Rangers, which mainly maintained garrisons in southern Quebec and occasionally took part in raids into New York state.

== Life in Canada ==
After the war, Edward Jessup and his troops settled along the Saint Lawrence River; he himself settled in Augusta Township. He was appointed justice of the peace and a judge of the Court of Common Pleas. With his son, he founded the town of Prescott, Ontario.

== Family ==
His son, Edward Jr., was elected to the 2nd Parliament of Upper Canada representing Grenville and became a lieutenant-colonel in the local militia. His grandson, Edward, was elected to the 11th Parliament of Upper Canada for Grenville.

== Later life and death ==
Later in life, Edward Jessup suffered from the palsy and died, on February 3, 1816, in Prescott, Province of Upper Canada, British Canada, British Empire, now Prescott, Ontario, Canada, in 1816, aged 80.
