= Grenville County, Ontario =

Former county in Ontario, Canada

Coordinates: 44°50′N 75°40′W

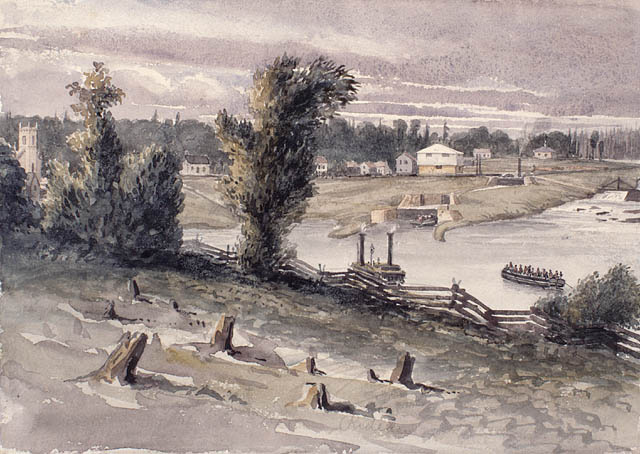
Merrickville, Rideau River c.1838

Grenville County is a former county in the Canadian province of Ontario. It fronted on the north shore of the Saint Lawrence River, between the towns of Kingston and Cornwall. The county was created in 1792, and named in honour of William Grenville, 1st Baron Grenville, who was the British Secretary of State responsible for the colonies in 1790. It consisted of five townships, which were settled primarily by United Empire Loyalists in the late 1700s after the Revolutionary War. Prior to being settled by Europeans, the area was home to many generations of native cultures. Grenville County merged with Leeds County in 1850 to create Leeds and Grenville County. The county covered an area of 272,261 acres (110,180 ha).

== History ==
Prior to European settlement, numerous Native American villages were present in Grenville County; when the settlers first arrived, these natives still occupied the area and were essentially forced out by the settlements. The French briefly occupied this area at present-day Johnstown, in what was to become Edwardsburgh township, and at Pointe au Baril (present day Maitland) in what would be Augusta township. These French settlements date back to 1670 and 1759 respectively.

In the late 1700s while the region was part of the British Lununberg District in the Province of Quebec, land was surveyed in and around what would later become Grenville County to be distributed as land grants to the United Empire Loyalists and their families for their loyalty to the Crown. The emphasis of the Crown government was on military defense, economic growth and political stability. The strategy was to increase the population, maintain efficient military districts, and develop political counties and townships to be dotted with agricultural hamlets and towns and commercially-oriented cities. There was not emphasis on industrial development because of lack of basic infrastructure in the region. The first townships laid out were called the Royal Townships. Situated along the St. Lawrence River where land was most productive and travel was convenient, two of these townships were to become part of Grenville County – Edwardsburgh, Royal Township Six, and Augusta, Royal Township Seven. In 1791 the Province of Upper Canada was created from part of the Province of Quebec. The Upper Canada partition of Lunenberg District was renamed Eastern District in 1792; Grenville County was one of the counties created in 1792. Shortly after the Loyalist refugee arrivals, Irish and Scottish immigrants began to settle in the area as well.

The European settlers dotted the new townships with small agricultural communities which were mostly self-sustaining. These communities were established out of necessity, as roads in the area were not well-established during nineteenth century and people were travelling on foot or via horse and buggy. Every few kilometres, a village or hamlet was usually present; these villages usually each had their own churches, schools, cemeteries and temperance halls, as well as pioneer businesses such as cheese factories, saw and grist mills, blacksmiths, limekilns, post offices, general stores or asheries. Most residents made their living through small-scale mixed farming operations. But there was an ennui; the Durham Report led to merging the Colony of Upper Canada on 10 February 1841 as Canada West into the (United) Province of Canada, thus assuring lower cost funding for long term improvements in Canada West and more dynamic prospects in British North America.

One reason counties existed was so inhabitants could conduct legal transactions efficiently, as each county was the seat of a county court. As transportation improved within some counties, their political consolidation with neighboring counties could occur leading to better integration and centralization efficiencies. On 1 January 1850, Grenville county was amalgamated with the neighbouring county of Leeds, to become the United Counties of Leeds and Grenville, while Johnstown District was abolished. Prior to confederation, the area of Upper Canada was divided by districts, which held the counties, which held the townships; districts changed often in name and in area making records from this era appear confusing. During the mid-1800s within Canada West, counties began amalgamating as transportation improved and the districts were dropped as counties increased in population. At the founding of the Dominion of Canada on 1 July 1867, Grenville County, amalgamated with Leeds, became part of Ontario, with Ontario now being divided neatly by counties.

== Territorial evolution ==
The original county was constituted in 1792, and was an electoral district for the new Legislative Assembly of Upper Canada:

... which county is to bounded on the east by the westernmost line of the county of Dundas, on the south by the river St. Lawrence, and on the west by the easternmost boundary line of the late township of Elizabethtown, running north twenty-four degrees west until it intersects the Ottawa or Grand river, thence descending the said river until it meets the northwesternmost boundary of the county of Dundas. The said county of Grenvill is to comprehend all the islands in the said river St. Lawrence nearest the said county, in the whole or greater part fronting the same.

In 1798, the Parliament of Upper Canada withdrew parts of Grenville and Leeds to form Carleton County and the three counties together were constituted as Johnstown District, effective at the beginning of 1800. Grenville consisted of the following townships:

Organization of Grenville County (1800)

The townships of

- Edwardsburg
- Augusta
- Wolford
- Oxford on the Rideau
- Marlborough
- Montague
- North Gower
- South Gower

In 1838, the townships of Marlborough and North Gower were transferred to Carleton County, and the township of Montague was transferred to Lanark County.

When the Johnstown District was abolished in 1850, Grenville County was united with Leeds County to form the United Counties of Leeds and Grenville.

== Original townships ==
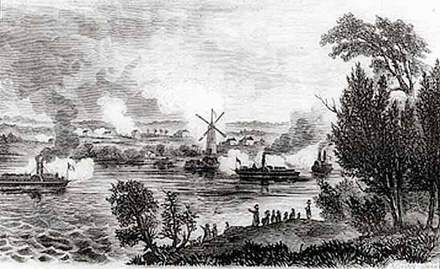
Battle of the Windmill in New Wexford, Edwardsburgh, 1838

The five remaining townships at 1838 were Augusta, Edwardsburgh, Oxford-on-Rideau, South Gower, and Wolford.

- Augusta township (still exists), covers an area of 75,083 acres (30,385 ha). It was first surveyed in 1783, and was named in honour of Princess Augusta Sophia, second daughter and sixth child of George III. This township is located along the southern border of Leeds and Grenville along the St. Lawrence River.
- Edwardsburgh township (now Edwardsburgh/Cardinal), covers an area of 66,669 acres (26,980 ha). The township was first surveyed in 1783, and was named in honour of Prince Edward, fourth son and fifth child of George III. This township is located along the southern border of Leeds and Grenville along the St. Lawrence River, east of Augusta township.
- Oxford-on-Rideau township (Now part of North Grenville), covered an area of 59,350 acres (24,018 ha) and was first surveyed in 1791. The township was later amalgamated in the 1990s with South Gower township and the town of Kemptville to become North Grenville. This township was located north of both Edwardsburgh and Augusta townships, between Wolford and South Gower.
- South Gower township (Now part of North Grenville), covered an area of 27,709 acres (11,213 ha) and was first surveyed in 1799. This township was located north of Edwardsburgh.
- Wolford township (now the village-status municipality of Merrickville-Wolford) covered an area of 46,851 acres (18,960 ha) and was first surveyed in 1795. It was named for the Devonshire seat of John Graves Simcoe. This township was located west of Oxford-on-Rideau, and north of Augusta. In the 1990s, Wolford township became known as its own municipality, and was renamed Merrickville–Wolford.

== See also ==
- List of Ontario census divisions
- List of townships in Ontario
- Augusta Township
- Edwardsburgh/Cardinal Township
- North Grenville Township
- Leeds and Grenville County
- Johnstown, Ontario
- Spencerville, Ontario
- Maitland, Ontario
- North Augusta, Ontario
- Prescott, Ontario
- Kemptville, Ontario
- Merrickville–Wolford, Ontario
- Upper Canada
