= 5th Parliament of Upper Canada =

Parliament for Upper Canada 1809–1812

The 5th Parliament of Upper Canada was the composition of the Parliament of Upper Canada between February 1809 and May 1812, and consisted of

- The Crown of the United Kingdom, as represented by Francis Gore, the Lieutenant Governor of Upper Canada during its first three years and by General Isaac Brock, the colony's administrator (the acting governor) during its final year, and advised by the Executive Council of Upper Canada
- the appointed members of the Legislative Council of Upper Canada that were in office during that time
- members elected to the House of Assembly of Upper Canada in elections held in May 1808.

While references to "parliament" in modern Canadian and British political discourse generally refer to the elected chamber of the legislature, the elected assembly of Upper Canada wielded relatively little power relative to the unelected legislative council and was afforded little deference by either the Lieutenant Governor or the Legislative Council. Accordingly, the Crown and the upper house were both significant elements of parliaments in its role as the legislature of the colony.

== Sessions ==
The 5th Parliament was convened over four sessions, held between February and March of each of the years 1809, 1810, 1811, and 1812.

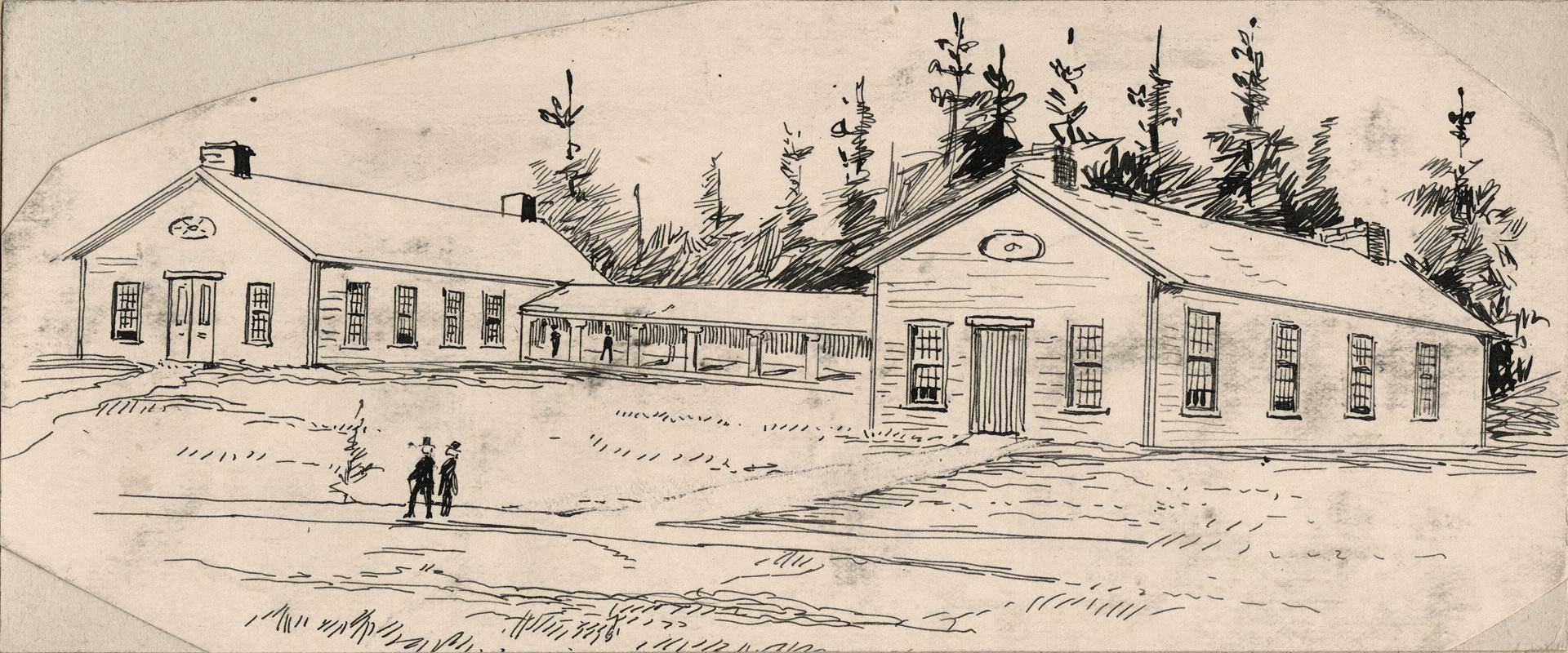
The first dedicated parliamentary buildings for the Legislature of Upper Canada was completed in 1794, although it was later destroyed after the Battle of York in 1813.

Sessions	Start	End
1st	2 February 1809	9 March 1809
2nd	1 February 1810	12 March 1810
3rd	1 February 1811	13 March 1811
4th	1 February 1812	6 March 1812

All sessions were held at the Palace of Parliament located at the located at the intersection of Front Street and Parliament Street in York, Upper Canada (now City of Toronto, Parliament Street was named due to the building, though Front Street was on the Bay at the time). It would be the last parliament to be in session at the site for its entirety. The Palace of Parliament was set ablaze and destroyed by American Troops in the plundering following the Battle of York on April 27, 1813.

No known copies of the journals for the first session held 1809 survived to this day. Accordingly, some aspect of the 5th Parliament cannot be definitely explained or determined.

The 5th Parliament was dissolved on May 1, 1812 by the Administrator of the Government Isaac Brock who had been frustrated in his efforts to pass legislation preparing the colony for war with the United States. Elections were held in June that year and the 6th Parliament was convened in the last week of July for a very short extraordinary session, the first time more than one session of parliament was convened within a calendar year in Upper Canada.

== Composition ==
The composition of the House of Assembly was prescribed by legislation passed in March 1808. The membership of the assembly was expanded from nineteen seats in the 3rd and 4th parliaments to twenty-five seats. The six addition electoral divisions came from the following changes.

1792 districts (Note: Upper Canada went through numerous iteration of district redistribution, some of the changes were transitory and very narrow focus. Inclusion of all would detract rather than serve the purpose of showing geographical division. Districts that were created and in effect at the time are included in brackets for reference.)	Electoral divisions in 3rd and 4th	Electoral divisions in 5th
Eastern	Glengarry & Prescott (duo-member)	Glengarry (duo-member)
Eastern	Glengarry & Prescott (duo-member)	Prescott
Midland	Lennox & Addington	Lennox & Addington (duo member)
Home	Durham, Simcoe & York 1st	East York & Simcoe
Home	Durham, Simcoe & York 1st	Northumberland & Durham
Home	West York, 1st Lincoln & Haldimand (duo-member)	West York
Niagara	West York, 1st Lincoln & Haldimand (duo-member)	1st Lincoln & Haldimand (duo-member)
Niagara	2nd, 3rd & 4th Lincoln (duo-member)	2nd Lincoln
Niagara	2nd, 3rd & 4th Lincoln (duo-member)	3rd Lincoln
Niagara	2nd, 3rd & 4th Lincoln (duo-member)	4th Lincoln
London	Norfolk, Oxford & Middlesex	Norfolk
London	Norfolk, Oxford & Middlesex	Oxford & Middlesex

== List of Members ==
=== Members of the House of Assembly ===
Riding	Member	First elected/ previously elected	No. of terms
Dundas	Henry Merkley	1808	1st term
Essex	Matthew Elliott	1804	2nd term
Essex	Jean Baptiste Baby	1808	1st term
Frontenac	Allan McLean	1804	2nd term
Glengarry	Alexander Macdonell	1800	3rd term
Glengarry	Thomas Fraser	1808	1st term
Grenville	Stephen Burritt	1808	1st term
Hastings & Ameliasburgh Township	James McNabb	1808	1st term
Kent	John McGregor	1804	2nd term
Leeds	Peter Howard	1804	2nd term
Lennox & Addington	John Roblin	1808	1st term
Lennox & Addington	Willet Casey (Feb 1811)	1811	1st term
Lennox & Addington	Thomas Dorland	1804	2nd term
1st Lincoln County & Haldimand	Joseph Willcocks	1808	2nd term
1st Lincoln & Haldimand	Levi Lewis	1808	1st term
2nd Lincoln	David Secord	1808	1st term
3rd Lincoln	Samuel Street – Speaker 1809–1812	1796	4th term
4th Lincoln	Crowell Willson	1808	1st term
Norfolk	Philip Sovereign	1808	1st term
Northumberland and Durham	David McGregor Rogers	1800	3rd term
Oxford & Middlesex	Benajah Mallory	1804	2nd term
Prescott	Thomas Mears	1808	1st term
Prince Edward except Ameliasburgh Township	James Wilson	1808	1st term
Prince Edward except Ameliasburgh Township	John Stinson (Feb 1811)	1811	1st term
Stormont & Russell	John Brownell	1808	1st term
Stormont & Russell	Abraham Marsh (Sept 1810)	1810	1st term
East York & Simcoe	Thomas B. Gough	1808	1st term
West York	Richard Beasley	1808	1st term
West York	John Willson (Feb 1810)	1810	1st term

=== Member of the Legislative Council ===
The Legislative Council was the appointed upper house of the parliament. It held veto power over all legislations passed by the elected assembly and exercised it regularly with little deference to assembly democratic mandate. Members were appointed for life (but were subject to removal for non-attendance), therefore the date for the end of their term were usually the date of their death.

Member	Town	Appointed	Term ended	Notes
James Baby	Sandwich	July 12, 1792	February 19, 1833	
Richard Cartwright	Kingston	July 12, 1792	July 27, 1815	
Alexander Grant, Sr.	York	July 12, 1792	May 8, 1813	Also a member of the Executive Council
Robert Hamilton	Niagara	July 12, 1792	March 8, 1809	
Æneas Shaw	York	June 19, 1794	February 6, 1814	
Jacob Mountain	Quebec City	July 1, 1794	June 25, 1825	Member ex officio Anglican Bishop of Quebec, did not attend any sitting
John McGill	York	June 10, 1797	December 31, 1834	Also a member of the Executive Council; Inspector General (1801–13); Auditor General of Land Patents (1813–18)
Thomas Scott	York	August 7, 1806	July 29, 1824	Speaker of council ex officio Chief Justice of the Court of King's Bench (1806–16)
Thomas Talbot	Port Talbot	September, 1809	February 10, 1841	
William Claus	Niagara	February 1, 1812	November 11, 1826	

== See also ==
- Legislative Council of Upper Canada
- Executive Council of Upper Canada
- Legislative Assembly of Upper Canada
- Lieutenant Governors of Upper Canada, 1791-1841
- Historical federal electoral districts of Canada
- List of Ontario provincial electoral districts
