= Winona, Ontario =

Human settlement in Ontario, Canada

Winona (43°12′29″N 79°39′04″W) is a small community in Southern Ontario that is officially part of the City of Hamilton, Ontario. It is located 19 km east of Downtown Hamilton and 54 km south-west of Toronto. Additionally, It is roughly halfway between Buffalo (85 km) and Toronto (77 km) along the QEW. It has a proper population of 14,076 as of the 2021 Census.

== History ==
Winona's first settlers built a farming hamlet called "the Fifty" close to the creek of that name and tight to the waterfront. Winona's centre shifted in the late 19th century away from the water and the creek to a new central place built around the railway and roads, and tied together by Winona (then called Station) Road. Later, the focus shifted in favour of Highway 8, the escarpment, and Winona Road.

Winona was part of the township of Saltfleet. On January 1, 1974, it became part of the New Town of Stoney Creek. Stoney Creek became a city in 1985. Fifteen years later, it was forcibly merged with the City of Hamilton by order of the Ontario government.

ED Smith and Sons dominated the economy and society of Winona from 1890 to 1980. E. D. Smith, a businessman and politician, founded the E.D. Smith food company in 1882 when he started making jam out of left over fruit. He opened his first jam factory in 1904.

John Willson, the first speaker of the Legislative Assembly of Upper Canada, moved to Saltfleet Township (Winona) from New Jersey in the 1790s. He became a justice of the peace for Gore District (present day Hamilton, Ontario) in 1811. His son Hugh Bowlby Wilson was born in Winona and fought in the 3rd Gore Regiment during the Rebellion of 1837 before going on to practice law. In 1849, during the annexationist movement he became editor of the newspaper The Independent, which supported the movement.

== Government ==
Formerly part of Saltfleet Township and the City of Stoney Creek until amalgamation in 2001, Winona is represented locally by the councillor for Ward 10 on Hamilton City Council. Additionally, Winona forms part of the federal and provincial electoral districts of Hamilton East-Stoney Creek. At the federal level, it is represented by Conservative Member of Parliament Ned Kuruc, who worked as a mortgage specialist, entrepreneur and cannabis brand owner before entering politics. At the provincial level, it is represented by Progressive Conservative Jeff Beattie.

== Peach festival ==
Winona hosts the annual Winona Peach Festival at the end of August in celebration of the peach harvest. It began in 1967 to raise money for local charitable organizations.

== Schools ==
Winona's first school was a private school, located close to the Fifty Creek. In 1816 marked a turning point for education as Winona's John Willson spearheaded Upper Canada's first Common School Act. The third elementary school building was located at Highway 8 and Winona Road and was called.

Winona's present Elementary School moved to this newly constructed facility in 2012. The building is the fifth elementary school built and is on the same site of the Winona High School, which was located at the corner of Lewis Road and Barton Street until it was sold to the Roman Catholic School Board.

Glover Road Public School was built to ease the congestion of Fruitland and Winona schools when the population boomed after WWII. The population boom was short-lived however, and the school closed in 1982.

In 2009, the school building located at Lewis Road and Barton Street that was originally Winona High School was demolished with plans to relocate Winona Public School to this location. A time capsule was discovered by an operator of an excavator. It had been sealed in the cornerstone when the school was built in 1962.

== Churches ==
- Winona Gospel Church
- St. Johns Anglican Church c. 1890
- Fifty United Church c. 1925 from merger of several Methodist congregations with Church Union.
- Immaculate Heart of Mary c. 1953 the first church was built after initially located at E.D Smith Home acquired after Senator Smith's death in 1948.

== Notable people ==
- E. D. Smith, a Canadian businessman and politician who founded a food company that bears his name.
- Ian Thomas, Singer/Songwriter who lived in Winona from 1975 until 2010.
- John Willson, the first speaker of the Legislative Assembly of Upper Canada
