= Wentworth (Province of Canada electoral district) =

Province of Canada electoral district

Wentworth Canada West
Province of Canada electoral district

Defunct pre-Confederation electoral district
- Legislature: Legislative Assembly of the Province of Canada
- District created: 1841
- District abolished: 1867
- First contested: 1841
- Last contested: 1851

Wentworth was an electoral district of the Legislative Assembly of the Parliament of the Province of Canada, in Canada West (now Ontario). It was created in 1841, upon the establishment of the Province of Canada by the union of Upper Canada and Lower Canada. Wentworth was represented by one member in the Legislative Assembly. In 1853, it was split into two ridings, Wentworth North and Wentworth South.

== Boundaries ==
Wentworth electoral district was based on Wentworth county (now part of the city of Hamilton), at the northwestern end of Lake Ontario. Hamilton and Burlington were the two major centres.

The Union Act, 1840 merged the two provinces of Upper Canada and Lower Canada into the Province of Canada, with a single Parliament. The separate parliaments of Lower Canada and Upper Canada were abolished. The Union Act provided that the pre-existing electoral boundaries of Upper Canada would continue to be used in the new Parliament, unless altered by the Union Act itself.

Wentworth county had been an electoral district in the Legislative Assembly of Upper Canada, and its boundaries were not altered by the Union Act. Those boundaries had originally been set by statute in 1816, when Wentworth county was created as a separate county in the new district of Gore, carved out of the existing Niagara and Home districts. Wentworth country was defined to include:

That the township of Saltfleet, Barton, Benbrook, Glanford, Ancaster and the Beach between Burlington Bay and Lake Ontario, and the Promontory near Coot's Paradise, and so much of the County of Haldimand as lies between Dundas Street and the Onondaga village, commonly called Bear's Foot, including said village, shall from henceforth form and be called the County of Wentworth...

Since Wentworth was not changed by the Union Act, those boundaries continued to be used for the new electoral district. Wentworth was represented by one member in the Legislative Assembly.

== Members of the Legislative Assembly ==
The following were the members for Wentworth.

Parliament	Years	Members	Party
1st Parliament; 1841–1844	1841–1844	Harmannus Smith	Unionist; Moderate Reformer

== Abolition ==
Wentworth electoral district was abolished in 1853, when there was a major redistribution of seats in the Legislative Assembly. Wentworth was split into two new ridings, Wentworth North and Wentworth South. The abolition took effect in the general election of 1854.
