= Harmannus Smith =

Politician in Upper Canada and Province of Canada

Member of the Legislative Assembly of Upper Canada for Wentworth County
- In office 1834–1836 Serving with Jacob Rymal
- Preceded by: John Willson and Allan MacNab
- Succeeded by: Allan MacNab and Michael Aikman

Member of the Legislative Assembly of the Province of Canada for Wentworth
- In office 1841–1851
- Preceded by: New position
- Succeeded by: David Christie

Member of the Legislative Council of the Province of Canada for Burlington
- In office 1856–1864
- Succeeded by: H.B. Bull

Personal details
- Born: November 13, 1790
- Died: July 1, 1872 (aged 81)
- Spouse: Elizabeth Fillman
- Children: 4 sons, 3 daughters

Harmannus Smith (November 13, 1790 – July 1, 1872) was a physician, farmer and political figure in Upper Canada and then the Province of Canada. He represented Wentworth County in the Legislative Assembly of Upper Canada from 1834 to 1836 as a Reformer and then in the Legislative Assembly of the Province of Canada from 1841 to 1851. He served a six-year term in the Legislative Council of the Province of Canada, from 1858 to 1864.

== Early life and family ==
Smith was born in Louth Township, Upper Canada, the son of Joseph Smith, a United Empire Loyalist, and Anna Margaret House, the daughter of a United Empire Loyalist. He attended school in Niagara and then studied medicine with a Dr. Allen. Smith later served as a member of the Medical Board for Canada West.

Smith served in the militia during the War of 1812 as a private and then assistant surgeon. He lived in Barton Township and Ancaster Township, both in Wentworth County. Smith married Elizabeth Fillman. The couple had seven children: four sons and three daughters.

== Political career ==
Smith was first elected to the Legislative Assembly of Upper Canada in October 1834, for the 12th Parliament of Upper Canada. He and Jacob Rymal were the two members for Wentworth County.

Following the election of 1834, the Legislative Assembly was dominated by reformers, who opposed the government of the Lieutenant Governor of Upper Canada, Sir Francis Bond Head, refusing to pass budget bills. As a result of the frequent clashes, Lieutenant Governor Head dissolved the 12th Parliament after only two annual sessions. In the resulting election, Smith and Rymal were defeated by Allan MacNab and Michael Aikman. Smith did not appear to have much acceptance among the provincial elite.

In 1841, the provinces of Lower Canada and Upper Canada were united into the Province of Canada by the Act of Union of 1840, passed by the British Parliament. The union of the provinces was in response to the Rebellions of 1837–1838. The separate parliaments of Lower Canada and Upper Canada were replaced by the new Parliament of the Province of Canada, composed of the Legislative Assembly and the Legislative Council.

Smith stood for election to the Legislative Assembly in the first general election in 1841. He was elected for the Wentworth electoral district, defeating Willson. He was re-elected in the elections of 1844 and 1848, defeating Aikman both times. He did not stand for election in 1851.

In the first Parliament, Smith supported the union and was generally a moderate Reformer. He initially supported the government of the Governor General, Lord Sydenham, but gradually came to support Robert Baldwin in his contests with subsequent governors-general over the principles of responsible government.

He was elected to the Legislative Council of the Province of Canada for Burlington in 1856, serving until 1864.
