= Rymal =

Rymal is a surname. Notable people with the surname include:

- Jacob Rymal (1790–1856), Canadian farmer and politician
- Joseph Rymal (1821–1900), Canadian farmer and politician
- William Rymal (1759–1852), Canadian settler and farmer
