= John Willson (politician) =

Canadian politician

John Willson (August 5, 1776 – May 26, 1860) was a judge and political figure in Upper Canada.

He was born in New Jersey in 1776. He arrived in the Niagara District around 1789 and settled in Saltfleet Township, where he became a farmer, in 1797. In 1809, he was elected to the 5th Parliament of Upper Canada in a by-election in the West riding of York County. He supported reform and voted against the suspension of habeas corpus in the province during the War of 1812. He helped introduce the Common Schools Bill, which introduced public support of elementary schools. In his later periods in office, he adopted more a more conservative position, although he continued to represent the interests of farmers. In 1832, he supported a bill to dispose of the clergy reserves, proposing that the proceeds go to education.

He became a justice of the peace in the Gore District (present day Hamilton, Ontario) in 1811 and, in 1838, became a judge in the district court. In 1839, he became a member of the Legislative Council. He served as commissioner for the Burlington Bay and Welland Canals.

He died in Saltfleet Township in 1860 at age 83.

His great-great-granddaughter Dr. Elizabeth Bradford Holbrook (1913–2009) was one of Canada's preeminent portrait sculptors.

== Tribute ==
In 1986 was inducted into the Hamilton Gallery of Distinction.

Preceded by Levius Peters Sherwood	Speaker of the Legislative Assembly of Upper Canada; 1825–1828	Succeeded by Marshall Spring Bidwell
