= List of places named United Counties =

United Counties may refer to one of the following places:

== Australia ==
- Electoral district of United Counties of Murray and St Vincent, an electoral district of the Australian state of New South Wales, established 1856, dissolved 1859

== United Kingdom ==
- Northamptonshire, Bedfordshire, and surrounding counties, as used by:
  - United Counties League
  - United Counties Omnibus

== Ontario, Canada ==
- Some current and historical counties in the province of Ontario, Canada
  - United Counties of Leeds and Grenville, established 1850
  - United Counties of Prescott and Russell, established 1820
  - United Counties of Stormont, Dundas and Glengarry, established 1850
  - United Counties of Lincoln, Welland and Haldimand, Ontario, established 1849, since dissolved
  - United Counties of Northumberland and Durham, Ontario, established 1849, dissolved in 1974
