= Levi Lewis (politician) =

Canadian politician & farmer (1762–1828)

Levi Lewis (3 March 1762 – 28 October 1828) was a farmer and political figure in Upper Canada. He represented the 1st riding of Lincoln and Haldimand in the Legislative Assembly of Upper Canada from 1808 to 1812.

== Biography ==
He was born in 1762 in New Jersey, the son of Levi Lewis. Lewis joined a loyalist unit there but never served; he came to Grimsby Township in Upper Canada with his family in 1787. Lewis received a land grant and also purchased land from William Barber. Lewis married Mary Beamer. He served as overseer of roads for Grimsby Township. He later moved to Townsend Township and then Saltfleet Township. In 1818, Lewis was named a justice of the peace for the Gore District. He died near Grimsby in 1828.

== Legacy ==
His son, also named Levis Lewis, served as reeve for Saltfleet Township and built the Lewis House on Lewis Road, which is named after the family, near Hamilton.
