= Thomas Gough =

Thomas Gough may refer to:

- Thomas Gough (headmaster) (born c. 1854), Head of Elmfield College and Retford Academy
- Thomas Barnes Gough (1760–1815), Irish-born merchant and political figure in Upper Canada
- Thomas Gough (priest) (1777–1860), Dean of the Church of Ireland
