= Michael Aikman =

Michael Aikman may refer to:

- Michael Aikman (rower) (1933–2005), Australian rower
- Michael Aikman (politician) (1797–1881), businessman and political figure in Upper Canada
