= Crowell Willson (Upper Canada) =

Upper Canada politician

Crowell Willson (September 17, 1762 – August 11, 1832) was a farmer and political figure in Upper Canada.

He was born in Sussex County, New Jersey in 1762, the son of Sarah Crowell and Benjamin Willson(**), a United Empire Loyalist. Willson married Hannah Crane in 1783. He settled in Bertie Township in Upper Canada in 1787 and later moved to Crowland Township in 1801. In 1800, he was named justice of the peace in the Niagara District. He was elected to the 5th Parliament of Upper Canada in the 4th riding of Lincoln County in 1808. Willson's sister Sarah married John Fanning, also a politician in Upper Canada

He died in Crowland Township in 1832.

(**) Note: Some references about this Benjamin Willson erroneously report that he was noted for transporting supplies to troops during the American Revolution; this is actually the work of another Benjamin Willson (1741–1809), a resident of Rye, NY, who is on the DAR Patriot roster for transporting supplies to George Washington's Continental Army encamped at White Plains, NY.
