= Gore District =

Gore District may refer to:

- Gore District, New Zealand, a district in the Southland region of the South Island of New Zealand
- Gore District, Upper Canada, a historical district of Upper Canada, now the province of Ontario, Canada
