= John Brownell =

John Brownell may refer to:

- John Brownell (politician) (1765–1809), member of the Legislative Assembly of Upper Canada
- John C. Brownell (1877–1961), American actor and playwright
