= John Fanning (Upper Canada politician) =

Upper Canada politician

John Fanning (before 1781 – January 19, 1813) was a farmer, innkeeper, stagecoach operator and political figure in Upper Canada. He represented the 4th riding of Lincoln in the Legislative Assembly of Upper Canada from 1812 to 1813.

Born in the Thirteen Colonies, Fanning came to Upper Canada from South Carolina around 1781. He married Sarah Willson, the sister of Crowell Willson. Fanning lived at Newark and at Chippawa, where he operated an inn and mills. His mills were destroyed by fire during the War of 1812. Fanning operated the first stagecoach line in Upper Canada, serving Newark (Niagara), Chippawa and Fort Erie. He died in office in 1813.
