= Movements for the United States annexation of Canada =

U.S. states and Canadian provinces and territories

Various individuals and movements within Canada and the United States have campaigned in favour of U.S. annexation of parts of or all of Canada or have predicted it without endorsing it since their common origin as parts of British America. Before the United States even declared its independence, there were efforts to have parts of what is now Canada join the Thirteen Colonies in their complaints against Great Britain. American forces unsuccessfully attempted to invade Canada during the Invasion of Quebec of 1775 and War of 1812. One last American diplomatic effort to annex Canada was made in the aftermath of the American Civil War and confederation of Canada, but the 1871 Treaty of Washington did not include any such provisions.

Various groups and individuals in what is now Canada have campaigned for part or all of Canada (earlier, British North America) to join the United States, generally over opposition to British rule or the Canadian federal government. After a spike of interest, they have faded into obscurity, often after their concerns were addressed within the existing system. Historian Joseph Levitt is quoted in a 1993 book as saying:

Since the Treaty of Washington in 1871, when it first de facto recognized the new Dominion of Canada, the United States has never suggested or promoted an annexationist movement in Canada. No serious force has appeared on the American political scene that aimed to persuade or coerce Canadians into joining the United States. And no serious initiative for any move in this direction has come from the Canadian side either.

Surveys have suggested that a minority of Canadians would potentially support annexation, ranging from as many as 20 percent in a survey by Léger Marketing in 2001 to as few as seven percent in another survey by the same company in 2004. One poll in the 2020s, noted by the Toronto Star, showed that about 50% of Americans are against Canada joining, 25% are in favour, and 25% are not sure.

After winning a second term as president in the 2024 election, U.S. president Donald Trump said Canada should become the 51st state of the United States. Canadians responded strongly against these calls, with Prime Minister Justin Trudeau saying, "There isn't a snowball's chance in hell that Canada would become a part of the United States".

== Canadian annexationists ==
Historical annexationist movements inside Canada were usually inspired by dissatisfaction with British rule in Canada. Despite some unrest, opposition to British rule never reached the degree that led to the American Revolutionary War in 1775. Notably, Canada's population growth in the late 18th and early 19th centuries was spurred largely by United Empire Loyalists, who left the American colonies during the Revolution because of their loyalty to Great Britain. In the period from 1790 to 1837, imperial officials repeatedly denounced American-style republicanism and tried to suppress it.

=== 1837 ===
Groups of Irish immigrants took the route of armed struggle, attempting to annex the peninsula between the Detroit and Niagara Rivers to the United States by force in the minor and short-lived Patriot War in 1837–1838. Not all rebels desired union with the United States; some fought for an independent nation state or for liberal social reforms.

=== 1840s and 1850s ===
Between 1848 and 1854, a significant and articulate minority of conservatives in Upper Canada advocated constitutional changes modelled on the American federal-state system and the US Constitution. They critiqued Canada's imitation of British parliamentary government as simultaneously too democratic and too tyrannical. They believed it destroyed the independence of the appointed governor and Legislative Council and further concentrated power in the Cabinet. This critique led many conservatives to argue that the American model of checks and balances offered Canada a more balanced and conservative form of democracy than did the British parliamentary government. These "republican conservatives" debated a series of constitutional changes, including annexation to the United States, an elected governor, an elected Legislative Council, a federal union of British North America, and imperial federation, within this framework. These conservatives accepted "government by discussion" as the appropriate basis for political order.

In midcentury Montreal, with little immigration and complaints that the repeal of the Corn Laws had cut the region off from its British trade links, a small but organized group supported integrating the colonies into the United States. The leading organization advocating merger was the Annexation Association, founded in 1849 by an alliance of French Canadian nationalists and Anglophone businessmen in Montreal who had a common interest in the republic. Many of its members, including Louis-Joseph Papineau, were participants in the 1837–38 rebellions.

The Montreal Annexation Manifesto was published in 1849. It was hoped a merger with the United States would give Canada markets for its goods, ensure national security, and provide the finances to develop the West. A half measure was the Canadian–American Reciprocity Treaty of 1854 that linked the two countries economically. However, the movement died out in 1854. Annexation was never a very popular choice. Many Canadians were loyal to the Crown and Great Britain, especially the descendants of the United Empire Loyalists. French Canadians worried about being an even smaller minority in a larger union, and were concerned about American anti-Catholicism.

Around 1850, there was a serious annexationist movement on the border region of Quebec's Eastern Townships, where the American-descended majority felt that union with the United States would end their economic isolation and stagnation as well as remove them from the growing threat of French Canadian political domination. Leading proponents of this bipartisan movement were careful not to appear disloyal to Britain, however, and they actively discouraged popular protest at the local level. Fearful of American-style democracy, the local elite also expressed revulsion toward American slavery and militaristic expansionism. Consequently, the movement died as quickly in the Eastern Townships as it did in Montreal after Britain expressed its official disapproval and trade with the United States began to increase.

=== 1860s ===
William Seward, subsequently Secretary of State under Abraham Lincoln, predicted in 1860 that western British North America, from Manitoba to British Columbia, would join the United States along with Russian Alaska. Many in Britain, such as Goldwin Smith and The Times of London, were pessimistic about the future of British North America and agreed with Seward; The Times said that Britain would only object if the United States attempted to take the territory by force. Most Canadians were strongly opposed to the prospect of American annexation. Reports of the Annexation Bill of 1866 — a bill introduced in the U.S. House of Representatives that, contrary to myth, never came to a vote — might have been one of the many factors behind Canadian Confederation in 1867. Much more serious were the Fenian raids made by Irish Americans across the border in 1866, which spurred a wave of patriotic feeling that helped the cause of Confederation. The American Civil War further convinced many Canadians that the American experiment was a failure.

==== British Columbia ====
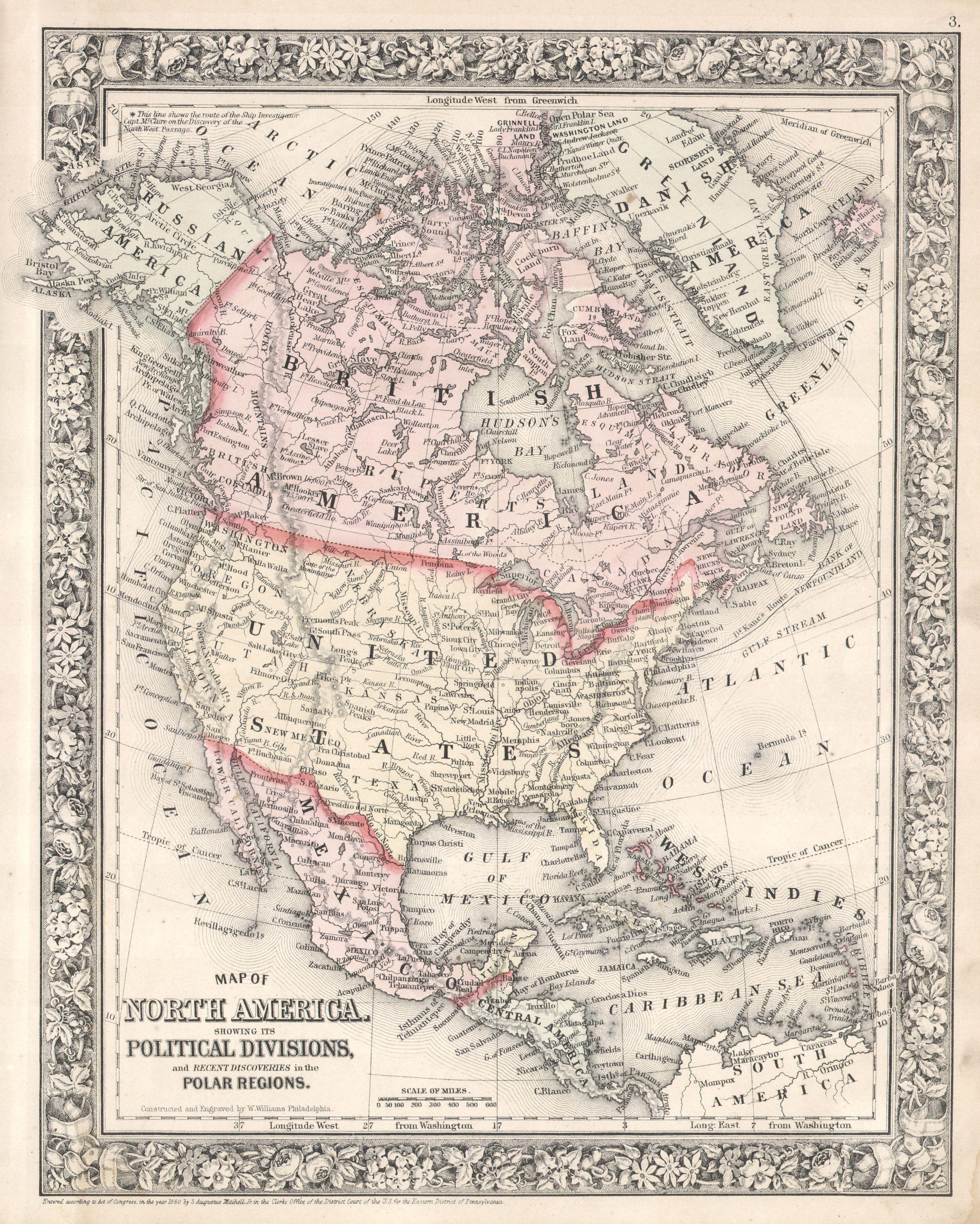
Map of North America in 1864

In the late 1860s, residents of the Colony of British Columbia, which was not yet a Canadian province, responded to the United States' 1867 purchase of Alaska with fear of being surrounded by American territory. Some residents wanted the colony to be the next American purchase. Local opinion was divided, with the three Vancouver Island newspapers supporting annexation to the United States, while the three mainland newspapers rejected the idea. Even opponents of the annexation scheme admitted that Great Britain had neglected the region and that grievances were justified. Nonetheless, annexation sentiment largely disappeared within a few months, and prominent leaders moved toward confederation with Canada.

Petitions circulated in favour of American annexation. The first, in 1867, was addressed to Queen Victoria, demanding that the British government either assume the colony's debts and establish a steamer link or allow the colony to join the United States. In 1869, a second petition was addressed to President Ulysses S. Grant, asking him to negotiate American annexation of the territory from Britain. It was delivered to Grant by Vincent Colyer, Indian Commissioner for Alaska, on December 29, 1869. The petitions were each signed by only a small fraction of the colony's population, and British Columbia was ultimately admitted as a Canadian province in 1871.

==== Nova Scotia ====
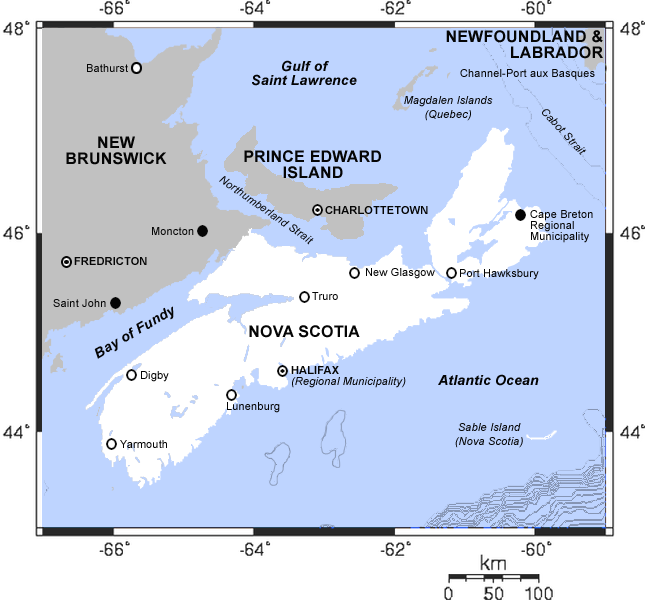
Map of Nova Scotia

Despite the general opposition, a substantial annexationist movement existed in Nova Scotia, and to a lesser degree in New Brunswick, Quebec, and Ontario, during the 1860s. Nova Scotia anti-confederationists led by Joseph Howe felt that pro-confederation premier Charles Tupper had caused the province to agree to join Canada without popular support. Howe in London unsuccessfully attempted to persuade the government to free Nova Scotia from the pending British North America Act by threatening American annexation. A significant economic downturn occurred after the 1866 end of the Reciprocity Treaty of 1854; the colony was heavily dependent on selling fish to Americans, causing many to believe that free trade with the United States was necessary for prosperity. Anti-confederationists won all but two seats in the 1867 provincial election; as in British Columbia, they did not necessarily support annexation. They again sent Howe to London to free Nova Scotia, but in 1868 the British government again refused, believing that New Brunswick would likely follow Nova Scotia out of the dominion and cause the new nation to collapse.

Angry Nova Scotians began talking seriously about annexation. An alarmed Howe — who wished Nova Scotia to be free of Canada but still with Britain — warned his supporters against disloyalty, dividing anti-confederationists. The provincial government, dominated by extremists who now also opposed Howe, decided that if another appeal to London failed, it would seize federal offices and unilaterally declare annexation, believing that Britain would not use force to stop the province. Believing he had no choice, Howe left the anti-confederationists. Although he narrowly won reelection to his federal parliamentary seat in March 1869 as a confederationist, support for secession and annexation grew that year. The federal government promised changes to taxes and tariffs, the economy was revived, and the United States agreed to free trade for Canadian fish. By 1871, the movement had mostly disappeared.

=== 1880s ===
A Quebec-born homeopathic physician, Prosper Bender, expressed disappointment with the Canadian experiment in the 1880s and 1890s. An author and the former host of a literary circle in Quebec City, Bender suddenly moved to Boston in 1882. After celebrating the promise of Confederation, he became a strong proponent of annexation to the United States and something of an intercultural broker; he helped interpret French-Canadian culture to American readers. Bender wrote in the North American Review in 1883 that many Canadians believed that annexation by the United States would occur "within the present generation, if not sooner". He believed that Irish Catholics — about one-quarter of Canada's population — would prefer annexation because of British rule in Ireland. They would be joined by the majority of those under 40, who viewed the United States as a prosperous, fast-growing neighbour providing many opportunities. He attributed the absence of an active annexationist movement in part to many who would favour such an effort taking the "easiest and quietest method of securing the benefits of annexation, by themselves silently migrating to the Republic", as more than a million already had.

Bender believed that Prime Minister John A. Macdonald's promise of a transcontinental railway linking eastern Canada to British Columbia to be overambitious and too expensive, and unfavourably compared the Canadian government's growing debt to the United States' rapid reduction of its Civil War debt. He stated that Canadian businesses would benefit from duty-free access to the American market, while "wondrous American enterprise, supported by illimitable capital" would rapidly prosper Canada, especially its vast undeveloped interior. Bender concluded with pessimism about the likelihood of success of a nation divided into two parts by 1,200 miles of "forbidding, silent wilderness stretching from the head-waters of the Ottawa to Thunder Bay, and thence to Manitoba".

=== 1890s ===
In 1891, Goldwin Smith posited in his book Canada and the Canadian Question that Canada's eventual annexation by the United States was inevitable, and should be welcomed if Canadians genuinely believed in the ideal of democracy. His view did not receive widespread support.

In January 1893, concerned about Canada's possible annexation, a goal then being pursued by the Continental Union Association (a group of Ontario and Quebec Liberals), Prime Minister Sir John Thompson delivered a speech on tolerance, Canadian nationalism, and continued loyalty to Britain. Thompson eventually learned that the desire to make Canada part of the United States was confined to a small minority amongst the Liberals.

=== 1900s ===
In 1901, W. T. Stead, a newspaper editor in London, England, discussed in The Americanization of the World possible annexations of Canada and Newfoundland. He believed that because of its size and strength, Canada would likely be the last of Britain's possessions in the Americas to join the United States. Stead cited several reasons for why he believed annexation seemed "inevitable", including rapidly growing economic ties and migration between the two countries, the French Shore, and disputes over the Alaska boundary and fishing rights in the Atlantic.

After the discovery of gold in the Yukon, many Canadians proposed to annex parts of Alaska currently controlled by the United States, by calling for a revision in the original map of the boundary line between the Russian Empire and the United States. The United States offered to lease the territory to Canada but not to give it back. London and Washington agreed on arbitration, with one member of the panel from Canada. In 1903, the Chief Justice of Britain sided with the Americans to resolve the map dispute in favour of the United States. Many Canadians felt a sense of betrayal on the part of the British government, whose national interest required close ties to the United States regardless of the interests of Canada.

=== 1930s ===
The 1932 establishment of the International Peace Garden on the North Dakota–Manitoba border honoured the long-lasting friendship between the two countries rather than attempts at annexation.

=== Newfoundland in the late 1940s ===
While the Dominion of Newfoundland was still separate from Canada before 1949, a party known as the Economic Union Party (EUP) sought closer ties with the United States. However, Canada objected to the possibility, and the British government, which administered the Dominion of Newfoundland as a de facto colony under an appointed Commission of Government, would not allow it to consider annexation with the United States in any referendum. Instead, the EUP sought to resume "responsible government" and would then explore American annexation. A referendum showed a plurality in support of independence, but not a majority; a runoff referendum resulted in Newfoundland instead confederating with Canada to become the tenth province.

=== 1980s ===
The Unionest Party was a provincial political party in Saskatchewan in 1980 that promoted the union of the western provinces with the United States. It was the most politically successful annexationist group, but its success was both short-lived and extremely limited in scope. The party briefly had two members in the Legislative Assembly of Saskatchewan, both of whom crossed the floor from another party, but dissolved within a few weeks after failing to qualify for official party status.

The original Parti 51 was a short-lived political party in Quebec in the 1980s that advocated Quebec's admission to the United States as the 51st state. The party won just 3,846 votes, or 0.11 percent of the popular vote in the province, in the 1989 election — fewer votes than the Marxist–Leninists or the satirical Lemon Party — and was dissolved the following year.

=== 21st century ===
Two modern provincial political parties have proposed that their province secede from Canada and join the United States. Neither attracted significant support. A 2022 poll showed that fewer than one in four Albertans support separation from Canada.

In 2016, Hans Mercier, a pro-American lawyer from Saint-Georges, Quebec, revived Parti 51. Mercier told La Presse that the times have changed since the party's previous era, as Quebec sovereigntism has waned in popularity. Mercier argued that Americans would be welcoming of a new Quebec state, and pointed to a survey taken during the administration of George W. Bush that suggested nearly 34 percent of Quebecers would support joining the United States. The revived party ran five candidates and received just 1,117 votes provincewide in the 2018 Quebec general election, representing 0.03 percent of the provincewide popular vote. The party ran again and received just 689 votes provincewide in the 2022 Quebec general election, representing 0.02 percent of the provincewide popular vote.

=== Albertan annexationism ===
Albertan flag with the addition of a lone star used by the Alberta 51 Project

Albertan seal promoted by the Alberta 51 Project

Alberta separatists have proposed several paths, one of which is joining the United States either as a territory or state. However, few among Albertan secessionists support actual annexation.

The most vocal group in Alberta advocating for annexation to the United States is the Alberta 51 Project, founded in 2020 by Peter Downing. Among the group's stated goals are the elimination of customs barriers, a stronger military presence, the protections of the US Constitution, enhanced protection for land and resources, and economic stability through the U.S. dollar. During an event in Calgary where American political commentator Tucker Carlson spoke with Alberta Premier Danielle Smith, members of the Alberta 51 Project staged a minor demonstration. Demonstrators displayed signs and a Trump 2024 campaign flag in support of Alberta annexationism.

==== Alberta during Trump's annexation proposals ====
Alberta premier Danielle Smith

Initially, Premier Danielle Smith believed that Trump's comments about annexing Canada were made in jest. However, amid escalating trade tensions between Canada and the United States following Trump's annexation proposal, Smith refused to endorse a retaliatory response to U.S. tariffs imposed by Trump. Instead, Smith advocated for increasing U.S. purchases of Alberta oil and rejected measures such as curtailing, suspending, or taxing energy exports. This stance placed Smith at odds with the federal government and other premiers across Canada.

On January 12, 2025, Smith set up an impromptu meeting with Trump at his Mar-a-Lago residence in Florida, as a guest of Canadian businessman and television personality Kevin O'Leary, discussing U.S.-Canadian energy relations. After she met with Trump, Smith warned that blocking energy exports to the U.S. in response to Trump's tariff threats could lead to a "national unity crisis" in Canada, as the provinces primarily own oil and gas resources, and that such a move by the federal government would not be tolerated in Alberta. She also remarked that if the federal government proceeded with an export ban, she could not "predict what Albertans would do". Smith expressed to other premiers that she was committed to safeguarding the livelihoods of Albertans from "destructive federal policies". While O'Leary expressed support for an "economic union", Smith remained noncommittal, refraining from taking a definitive stance on the issue of annexation.

Yes, premiers should be advocating for their own industries, their own communities, but they should also put their country first, as every single premier except Danielle Smith did.

— Justin Trudeau on the absence of Premier Danielle Smith, 16 January 2025,

Amidst no change in American attitudes in March, Smith criticized the President's tariffs as a betrayal and warned of economic challenges ahead. Smith still opposed an Alberta oil export tax as a countermeasure, however, arguing it would harm Canada's reliability as a supplier. Alberta NDP Leader Naheed Nenshi criticized her stance, arguing it weakened Canada's bargaining power.

Following statements by Trump expressing interest in annexing Canada, Alberta was the province least resistant to such a proposal. A January 2025 poll by the Angus Reid Institute indicated that approximately 18% of respondents in Alberta favoured Trump's annexation proposal, the highest of any province in Canada, but still showing a vast majority of Albertans opposed such a move.

In 2025, the Republican Party of Alberta was formed, and modelled after the US Republican Party.

==== Analysis on Alberta ====
In his 2014 book The Accidental Superpower, American geopolitical analyst Peter Zeihan suggested that both Alberta and the United States could benefit if Alberta became the 51st U.S. state. Zeihan argued that Alberta's economic contributions significantly support the Canadian national budget, noting that it consistently contributes more than it receives. He projected that, by 2020, Alberta's net financial contribution would exceed $20,000 per person, or $40,000 per taxpayer, which he characterized as one of the largest per capita wealth transfers in the Western world. Zeihan also highlighted the economic disparity between Alberta and other parts of Canada, suggesting that Alberta might maintain its prosperity more effectively outside of Canada. Though Zeihan's assertion that Alberta would become the richest state in the Union remains speculative, it reflects ongoing debates about the province's economic future and political alignment. Economists have noted that Alberta's economy, often compared to that of Texas, has a strong reliance on oil, gas, and agricultural exports. Any shift in sovereignty would require complex negotiations, such as adopting new tax structures, renegotiating trade agreements, and determining how to manage Alberta's extensive national parks and public lands. There are also concerns that Alberta's exit from Canada could disrupt established trade relationships under existing agreements like NAFTA.

Jordan Peterson, an Alberta-born United States resident media commentator, describes Alberta's position as increasingly tenuous, caught between federal policies that he claims stifle the province's energy industry and a U.S. administration that perceives Canada as economically dependent. He suggests that Alberta might consider statehood if Canada fails to provide a compelling reason to remain part of the federation. He outlines potential economic advantages Alberta could gain by joining the United States, including lower taxes, improved market access, and enhanced infrastructure support. Peterson stops short of advocating for Alberta's secession, instead calling for a renewed national vision focused on economic growth, strengthening national identity, and self-reliance. He warns that without a significant policy shift, Canada risks economic stagnation while the U.S. continues to grow its influence and prosperity. Edmonton Journal columnist David Staples argued that Prime Minister Justin Trudeau's governance has alienated Alberta through policies that undermine its oil and gas industry, recalling past comments by Trudeau that framed Alberta's influence as detrimental to Canada, reinforcing Western grievances about federal policies that restrict pipeline development and divert wealth from Alberta to the east. He argues that an Alberta free from Trudeau's policies could thrive economically, doubling oil production, reducing costs of living, and regaining regulatory autonomy.

By contrast, Calgary Herald political columnist Rob Breakenridge contended that Trump's proposal for Canadian statehood would be particularly harmful to Alberta. He argued that Alberta would lose its provincial autonomy, resources, and distinct identity. Assets such as the Alberta Heritage Savings Trust Fund and energy royalties would come under centralized control, diminishing Alberta's self-determination. Breakenridge dismissed statehood as impractical, instead calling for Canadians to address internal political divisions and instead emphasized the need for new Canadian leadership to address challenges from the Trump administration while maintaining Canada's sovereignty and unity.

== American proposals to annex Canada ==
=== Founders era ===
During the American Revolutionary War, the Continental Army invaded the St. Lawrence River Valley but was repelled. In the early years of the United States, some American political figures were in favour of invading or annexing what is now Canada and pre-approved the admission of the Province of Quebec to the United States in the Articles of Confederation in 1777.

In the War of 1812, the Americans tried unsuccessfully to defeat British forces by invading British North America.

=== Post–Civil War ===
After the American Civil War, several American politicians called for Britain to cede the Province of Canada as reparations for British-built goods and ships which were sold to Confederate citizens. This trade was conducted primarily by blockade runners delivering goods to Confederate ports after evading the Union blockade. Confederate agents received support from a portion of Canadians and Maritimers throughout the war and used Canada as a base for espionage and to raid border towns, such as in the St. Albans Raid. In 1872, the Alabama Claims were resolved by the U.S. being compensated $15.5 million in war reparations by Britain for damages caused by British-built Confederate commerce raiders as part of the 1871 Treaty of Washington, but American attempts to acquire Canada were dropped.

=== Proposals to annex Canada by Donald Trump ===
In December 2024, then President-elect Donald Trump and some of his supporters began expressing support for annexing Canada and making it the 51st state. This came after months of tariff threats on Canadian goods and renewed demands by Trump for Canada to increase its military spending and prioritize border security. Political leaders and public opinion in Canada overwhelmingly opposed this idea. Trump has continued to make proposals to annex Canada following his inauguration as President of the United States.

==== Pre-inauguration proposals ====
In December 2024, during a tense meeting at Mar-a-Lago over trade deficits and border security, Trump suggested Canada consider becoming the 51st U.S. state if Prime Minister Trudeau felt his planned tariffs would hurt Canada's economy. He referred to Trudeau as "Governor Justin Trudeau of the Great State of Canada" and said he looked forward to meeting with him again to continue talks on tariffs and trade. President-elect Trump reiterated the idea in social media posts and claimed that many Canadians favour statehood due to potential tax savings, economic growth, and increased security. He later suggested that Justin Trudeau's resignation was prompted by Canadian interest in the idea. Trump ruled out the use of military force to annex Canada, instead advocating for "economic force" to pressure Canada into joining.

Cabinet minister Dominic LeBlanc, who attended the December meeting, initially described Trump's comments as a joke. Following the remarks about "economic force," Canadian government officials were reportedly no longer seeing Trump's comments as satirical but were now taking Trump's "threats" seriously. Trump's comments were widely condemned by Canadian politicians. Trudeau stated there was not "a snowball's chance in hell" of Canada joining the United States. Statements criticizing Trump's comments were also made by other federal and provincial leaders and politicians.

==== Post-inauguration proposals ====
During his inaugural address on January 20, 2025, Trump stated that during his second presidency, the United States would expand its territory, which was in keeping with his pre-inaugural remarks about annexing the territory of other nations, including Canada's. Trump continued to reiterate his desire to annex Canada throughout his first 100 days in office.

Trump's video speech at WEF where he states Canada can avoid being given high tariffs by becoming a state

Speaking at the World Economic Forum, Trump reiterated his threats of broad tariffs and said that Canada could avoid the tariffs by becoming a U.S. state. According to the press, Trump's comment on Canada becoming the 51st state to avoid tariffs was met with shocked gasps in the hall.

In North Carolina, Trump reaffirmed his stance that Canada should become the 51st state, claiming that under an American-controlled Canada, Canadians would be offered lower taxes and better health coverage.

Trump announced 25 percent tariffs on all Canadian goods in February, then urged Canada to become the "cherished 51st State", pointing out the lack of tariffs and the guarantee of military security if they do, although he also acknowledged that it "would be a long shot." After Trump enacted the tariffs, Trudeau declared retaliatory tariffs and said that he believed Trump would be unsuccessful in crippling the economy of Canada to force it to join the United States.

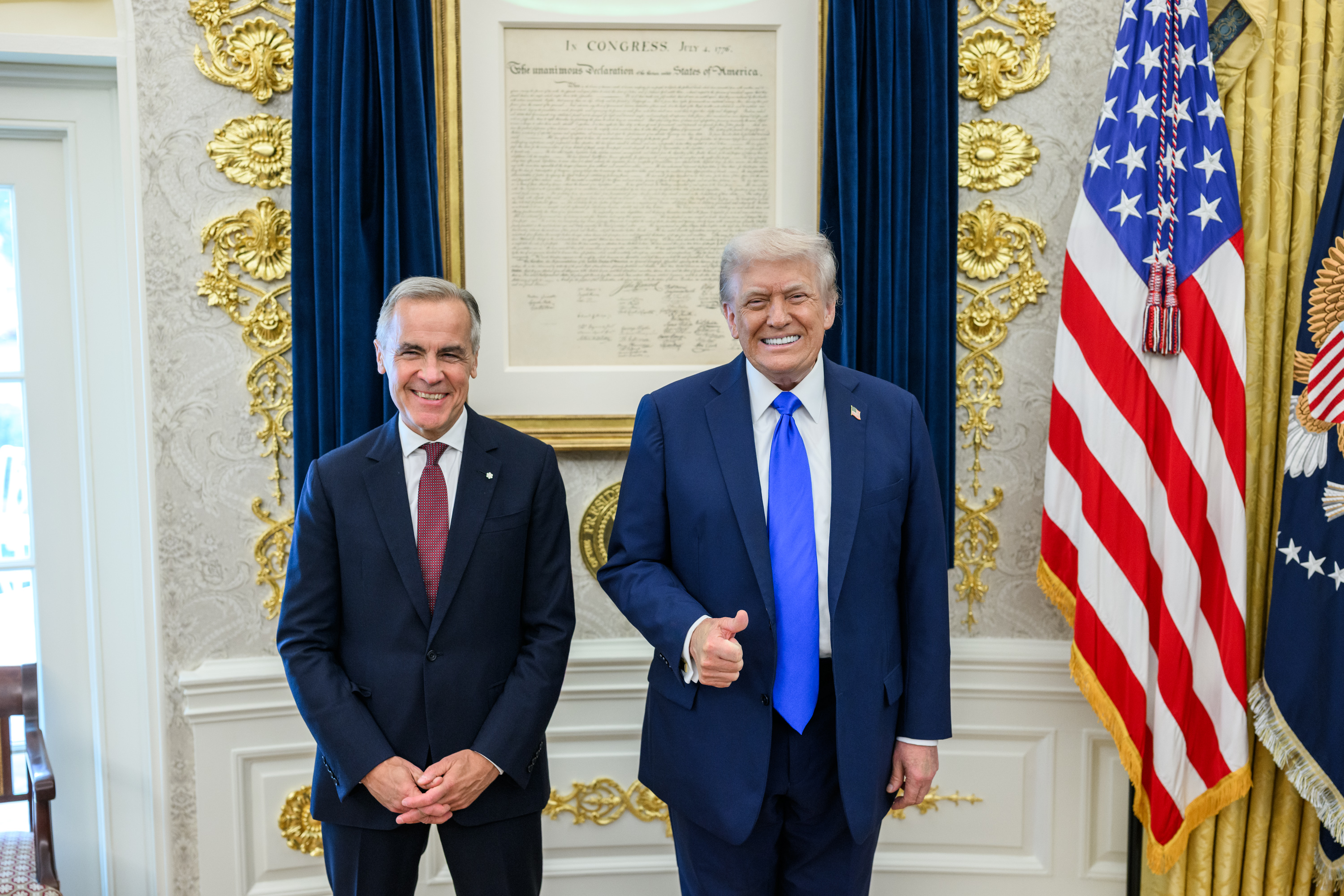
Canadian Prime Minister Mark Carney with U.S. President Donald Trump on October 7, 2025

In early May, Trump said he would continue to mention Canada being the 51st state, citing his initial grievances with the country concerning trade and defence, but posted on Truth Social and further explained during a press conference at a working meeting with new Canadian Prime Minister Mark Carney that the United States only required Canada's "friendship," saying that it was the only concession they were seeking. While he suggested that annexation would lower taxes paid by Canadians and allow them to be protected by the United States Armed Forces while also politically unifying North America, he acknowledged that "it takes two to tango" and said that it wouldn't be discussed unless those in the meeting wanted to. Trump did not rule out the possibility of Canada being part of the United States in the future, but only if it were feasible and mutually beneficial. He continued that despite any developments, the United States would maintain close diplomatic relations with Canada, but that Canada would have to be less economically dependent on the United States. The United States ambassador to Canada said thereafter that while Trump "may bring up the idea every once in a while", he acknowledges that it is unlikely to happen without the prime minister directly engaging on the idea.

==== Canadian responses to Trump's proposals ====
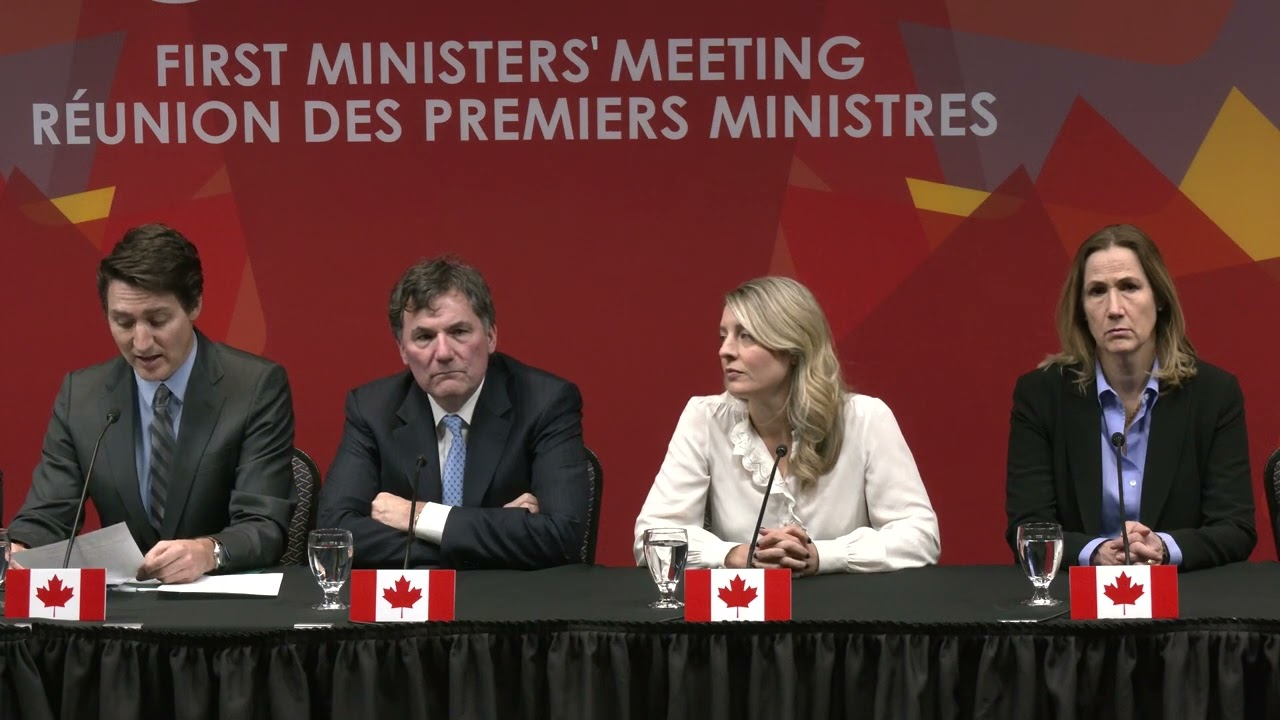
Prime Minister Justin Trudeau holds a media availability following the First Ministers' Meeting on Canada-U.S. relations.

Trump's proposals have been received broadly negatively in Canada, being condemned by all major political parties and leaders as well as causing increasing strain on Canada–United States relations. Polling conducted on the proposals has shown little support by Canadians for Canada becoming the 51st state.

===== Stance of Canadian officials =====
Canadian officials have widely condemned Trump's proposals at both provincial and federal levels. As Trump's comments progressed, the stance of Canadian officials changed from viewing the U.S. President's proposal as satirical to viewing it as a legitimate threat. Prime Minister Justin Trudeau stated publicly that he was against the proposal of Canada joining the United States, stating, "There isn't a snowball's chance in hell". Conservative Party leader Pierre Poilievre stated that Canada would never become the 51st state. On February 7, 2025, Trudeau was caught on a hot mic moment where he acknowledged the threat as "a real thing". In the closed-door meeting, a source stated that Trudeau labelled Trump's moves as originating from an interest in gaining access to Canada's critical mineral resources.

Jagmeet Singh, leader of the NDP, stated he saw the threat as real and called for strong action in response. "I want dollar-for-dollar retaliatory tariffs in place urgently, a 100 per cent tariff on Elon Musk's Teslas, and changes to procurement so Canada buys Canadian-made steel and aluminum for Canadian construction and manufacturing – protecting good, Canadian jobs... We will not let Trump – or anyone – threaten our values, economy or sovereignty." Elizabeth May, leader of the Green Party, hit back at the proposals from Trump at length, stating the comments were "never funny". May highlighted that Canada and the U.S. are very different, with Canada being a constitutional monarchy with a king as head of state, compared with America's republican system with a president. May also jokingly invited three U.S. states to join Canada.

Canada's head of state, Charles III, and his representative, Mary Simon, the Governor General of Canada, have not commented on Trump's proposals, due to the non-partisan role they play in the Canadian political system. A spokesperson for Buckingham Palace stated that Trump's annexation threats are "not something we would comment on". Experts have said, however, that if the situation with the United States continues, the Canadian government could ask the King to get involved in a limited capacity, such as by visiting Canada.

King Charles III and Queen Camilla visited Canada on May 26 and 27, 2025, with the King giving the Throne Speech to mark the opening of the 45th Canadian Parliament. The visit was intended as an affirmation of the country's sovereignty, underscored by remarks made by Prime Minister Mark Carney. In September 2026, Carney stated he and his administration had carefully examined the possibility of US military action against Canada and prepared accordingly.

===== Popular opinion =====
Trump's annexation and tariff threats have led to a noted increase in Canadian nationalism and patriotism since January 2025, including boycotts of American-manufactured goods, and Canadian fans booing and heckling the playing of the United States national anthem "The Star-Spangled Banner" before sporting events involving American teams, whilst cheering and applauding the Canadian national anthem "O Canada". An Ottawa-based branding company began selling caps with the slogan "Canada is not for sale", satirizing the "Make America Great Again" caps worn by Trump and his supporters; the caps have received widespread media and political attention, with Ontario premier Doug Ford having frequently worn them publicly and during a meeting with other premiers. The company struggled to keep up with the demand for the hats.

The 4 Nations Face-Off—an NHL-hosted hockey tournament featuring teams representing Canada, Finland, Sweden, and the United States—was held in February 2025 amid the animosity created by Trump's threats, with the American national anthem being booed by fans in Montreal during a Canada–United States round robin game, and some commentators drawing comparisons between the tournament and the 1972 Summit Series between Canada and the Soviet Union. The tournament final was played in Boston between the United States and Canada teams, where American fans contrarily booed Chantal Kreviazuk's performance of "O Canada". In protest of the annexation threats, Kreviazuk changed the lyric "in all of us command" to "that only us command". Following Canada's overtime victory in the final, Trudeau remarked on Twitter, "You can't take our country—and you can't take our game."

One of the major issues in the general election held on April 28, 2025, was that of Canadian sovereignty, with the incumbent Liberal Party going on to form a fourth consecutive government. The election results represented a significant contrast to polling estimates prior to the election campaign. In December 2024, the Conservative Party held a 20 percentage point polling advantage over the Liberals. However the resignation of Prime Minister Trudeau in January and Trump's hostility towards Canada were cited as reasons for the significant shift in public opinion.

== Opinion polling ==
=== Canadian polling ===
Since Donald Trump's comments on his support of annexing Canada, there have been some opinion polls conducted asking Canadians about their opinion of the proposal. The responses from Canadians have been overwhelmingly against Canada joining the United States as the 51st state. The strongest support for joining the US comes from Alberta.

Polls asking Canadian citizens
Should Canada join the United States of America as the 51st state
Date	Pollster/company	Yes	No	Unsure
September 5, 2026	Léger	9%	85%	6%
January 31, 2025	YouGov	15%	77%	8%
January 17, 2025	Abacus Data	22%	71%	8%
January 16, 2025	Ipsos	20%	80%	—N/a
January 14, 2025	Angus Reid	10%	90%	—N/a
December 10, 2024	Léger	13%	82%	5%

The president of the Angus Reid Institute, Shachi Kurl, added that the main reason why some Canadians support the idea of joining the United States is because they feel underserved by their current government; others see opportunities for personal gains. Other reasons for wanting to leave Canada and join the U.S. include disliking the monarchy.

=== American polling ===
Some polls have also been conducted asking American opinions on Canada being annexed as the 51st state. An Angus Reid poll reported 49% of Americans opposing the proposal and 25% supporting it, with 26% being unsure. Only half of the Americans surveyed said that Canada should be granted full statehood if they chose to join; 77% said that Canada should have the right to decide for themselves whether to join the United States or not and 5% said that it should be by economic force. Trump has rejected the idea of using military force.

Poll source	Date	Sample size (Note: Key: A – all adults RV – registered voters LV – likely voters V – unclear)	In favour	Oppose	Unsure/ Other
Emerson College	February 15–17, 2025	1,000 RV	26%	55%	19%
The Economist/YouGov	February 16–18, 2025	1,449 RV	20%	61%	19%
Echelon Insights	January 22–24, 2025	1,024 LV	16%	68%	16%
Atlas Intel	January 21–23, 2025	1,882 A	22%	65%	14%
Reuters/Ipsos	January 20–21, 2025	1,077 A	15%	64%	21%
YouGov	January 16–22, 2025	1,091 A	36%	42%	22%
HarrisX/Harvard	January 15–16, 2025	2,650 RV	41%	59%	—
YouGov/The Economist	January 12–14, 2025	1,419 RV	18%	64%	18%

One poll asked specifically about using military force of those supporting annexation.

Poll source	Date	Sample size	In favour	Oppose	Unsure/ Other
YouGov/The Economist	January 12–14, 2025	235 RV	29%	55%	15%

== Rhetoric on annexation ==
=== Pro-annexation ===
While talking with a guest on Tucker Carlson Today in January 2023, American commentator Tucker Carlson provocatively questioned, "We're spending all this money to liberate Ukraine from the Russians, why are we not sending an armed force north to liberate Canada from Trudeau?" Carlson then laughed at his remark, describing it as a "frenzy".

=== Anti-annexation ===
In the 1911 federal election, the Conservative response to the proposed reciprocity treaty negotiated by the Liberals was to denounce it as equivalent to an American economic takeover, with annexation likely to follow. The parties swapped positions in the later 1988 federal election when the Liberals used the same type of rhetoric to denounce the Progressive Conservatives' proposed Canada–United States Free Trade Agreement, although the Progressive Conservatives won that election and the agreement was implemented.

Annexation fears can be found throughout Canadian History for Dummies, in which humourist Will Ferguson stated that for "John L. O'Sullivan, it was the 'manifest destiny' of the United States to annex and possess all of North America". In fact, O'Sullivan's use of the term never extended beyond potential American annexation of Texas and the Oregon Territory; he explicitly wrote that he did not believe that the United States had a destiny to annex Canada.

=== Reverse annexation ===
Political satirists, including the Rhinoceros Party of Canada, have occasionally proposed reverse annexation, whereby all or part of the United States would be annexed into an expanded Canadian federation.

Following the 2004 American election, some Americans distributed the satirical Jesusland map on the Internet, depicting a similar proposal under which the "blue states" were part of a new political entity called "The United States of Canada". In 2019, there was a petition calling for the United States to sell Montana to Canada to pay off the U.S. federal debt.

On December 8, 2024, responding to Trump's annexation proposal, Green Party of Canada leader Elizabeth May humorously suggested California, Oregon, and Washington join Canada instead, reviving the idea of the Cascadia Movement. She offered universal health care and stricter gun laws and said Republican administrations may be happy to "get rid of all these states that always vote Democrat".

== Analysis ==
One article in Newsweek, published in December 2024, tried to analyze the economic, social, and geographic implications on the United States. They noted that Canada is slightly larger in population than California, the largest current US state by population, but has about 25 times the land area of California. However, the economy is smaller than several U.S. states, including California, New York, and Texas; overall the U.S. economy is ten times the size of Canada at the time. The article predicted that such a merger would increase trade, but also result in increased competition for businesses.

In January 2025, Canadian author Don Tapscott analyzed and proposed conditions for a merger, including preserving Canada's healthcare system, maintaining provincial identities as states, and introducing legal reforms on campaign finance, education funding, and gun control. Tapscott also noted that Ontario would become the fifth-largest state in the U.S. with 16 million residents and that Canada spends 11% of its GDP on healthcare compared to the U.S.'s 19% while achieving longer life expectancy. Critics say if annexation happens, nearly half of the population present in provinces could move and resettle across different states in the US, and the formerly-Canadian population would much decrease.

== See also ==
- American expansionism under Donald Trump
  - Opinion polling on the second Trump presidency#Annexing Canada
- North American Union
- Anglo-America
- American imperialism
- Canadian nationalism
- Indigenous land claims in Canada
- Proposed United States acquisition of Greenland
- Quebec sovereignty movement
- Jesusland map
- War Plan Red
- Union State
- Alberta separatism
- Aztlán

== Sources and further reading ==
- Angus, H. F., and R. M. MacIver; Canada and Her Great Neighbor: Sociological Surveys of Opinions and Attitudes in Canada concerning the United States Toronto: The Ryerson Press, 1938
- Berger, Carl C. The Writing of Canadian History: Aspects of English-Canadian Historical Writing since 1900 (2d ed. University of Toronto Press, 1986), chapter 6.
- Bowler, R. Arthur. "Propaganda in Upper Canada in the War of 1812." American Review of Canadian Studies 18.1 (1988): 11-32.
- Broschart, Christopher Michael. "Thus the Cry for Canada: How the Desire for Canada Shaped the Early American Empire, 1774–1815" (PhD dissertation. Drew University; ProQuest Dissertations & Theses, 2021. 28257203).
- Buckner, Phillip " 'British North America and a Continent in Dissolution': The American Civil War in the Making of Canadian Confederation." Journal of the Civil War Era 7.4 (2017): 512-540, a review of the scholarly studies.
- Cros, Laurence. "Le Canada et La Peur De L'annexion Americaine a L'epoque Victorienne, a Travers Les Dessins Politiques Canadiens" International Journal of Canadian Studies 2001 (23): 157–186. ISSN 1180-3991; Canadian cartoons often showed Uncle Same as a long, thin, vulture-like individual wearing striped pants and a starred top hat; Belonging to a generation of Victorians both prudish and fascinated by things erotic, Canadian cartoonists of the time took delight in concocting innumerable scenarios according to which Miss Canada would yield, willingly or unwillingly, to Uncle Sam's advances.
- Cumming, Carman. "The Toronto Daily Mail, Edward Farrer, and the Question of Canadian-American Union" Journal of Canadian Studies 1989 24(1): 121–139. ISSN 0021-9495 Campaigned for annexation to protect Anglophone Protestants in Quebec.
- Ellis, L. Ethan. Reciprocity 1911, A Study in Canadian-American Relations (1939)
- Granatstein, J. L. Yankee Go Home: Canadians and Anti-Americanism (1997)
- Horsman, Reginald. "On to Canada: Manifest Destiny and United States Strategy in the War of 1812." Michigan Historical Review (1987) 13#2: 1-24. online
- Keenleyside, Hugh, and Gerald S. Brown; Canada and the United States: Some Aspects of Their Historical Relations NY 1952
- Kilbourn, William (1956). The Firebrand: William Lyon Mackenzie and the Rebellion in Upper Canada. Toronto: Clarke, Irwin. Archived from the original on February 11, 2017 – via Questia.
- Levitt, Joseph. A Vision Beyond Reach: A Century of Images of Canadian Destiny Ottawa: 1982, twelve eminent Canadian intellectuals discuss annexation
- Little, J. I. "The Short Life of a Local Protest Movement: the Annexation Crisis of 1849-50 in the Eastern Townships." Journal of the Canadian Historical Association 1992 3: 45–67. ISSN 0847-4478
- McNairn, Jeffrey L. "Publius of the North: Tory Republicanism and the American Constitution in Upper Canada, 1848-54." Canadian Historical Review 1996 77(4): 504–537. ISSN 0008-3755
- Neuhold, Hanspeter, and Harald Von Riekhoff, eds.; Unequal Partners: A Comparative Analysis of Relations between Austria and the Federal Republic of Germany and between Canada and the United States Westview Press. 1993
- Neunherz, Richard E. "'Hemmed In': Reactions in British Columbia to the Purchase of Russian America". Pacific Northwest Quarterly 1989 80(3): 101–111. ISSN 0030-8803
- Nevins, Allan (1936). Hamilton Fish: The Inner History of the Grant Administration. Vol. 2. New York: Frederick Ungar Publishing Co. Archived from the original on February 11, 2017 – via Questia.
- Smith, Allan. Canada, An American Nation? (1994) intellectual history essays on continentalism and identity
- Smith, Goldwin (1891). Canada and the Canadian Question. London: Macmillan. Archived from the original on February 11, 2017 – via Questia.
- Tansill, Charles C. Canadian-American Relations, 1875-1911 (1943)
- Warner, Donald Frederic (1960). The Idea of Continental Union: Agitation for the Annexation of Canada to the United States, 1849-1893. Lexington, KY: University of Kentucky Press. Archived from the original on February 11, 2017 – via Questia.
