= Abraham Marsh =

Loyalist soldier and Upper Canada politician

Abraham Marsh (ca 1750 – May 8, 1833) was a political figure in Upper Canada. He represented Stormont & Russell in the Legislative Assembly of Upper Canada from 1810 to 1812.

Marsh served in the Royal Highland Emigrant Regiment (84th) during the American Revolution. He married Catherine French, the daughter of Jeremiah French. Marsh received a land grant in Cornwall Township. He served in the Stormont militia and was a justice of the peace for the Eastern District. Marsh was elected to the assembly in an 1810 by-election held following the death of John Brownell. He died in Mille Roches, Cornwall Township.

He was buried in the Maple Grove Cemetery; his remains were moved to the new Maple Grove Cemetery prior to the flooding of the old cemetery in 1958 due to the construction of the Saint Lawrence Seaway.
