= Canada and the Canadian Question =

1891 book by Goldwin Smith

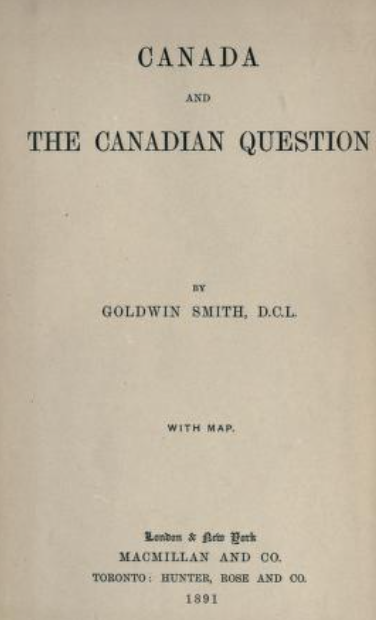
- Title page for Canada and the Canadian Question (1891)
- Author: Goldwin Smith
- Language: English
- Publication date: 1891

Canada and the Canadian Question is an 1891 book written by British-Canadian author Goldwin Smith that analyzes 19th-century Canada, including its governance, Quebec's French roots, and the Canadian Confederation. Its argument in favor of combining Canada with the northern states of the U.S. caused a furor.

Smith's analysis would later inspire a 1986 "update" by Peter Brimelow entitled The Patriot Game.
