= John Stinson (Canadian politician) =

Upper Canada politician (1764–1842)

John Stinson (March 12, 1764 – January 7, 1842) was a political figure in Upper Canada.

He was born in New Hampshire in 1764, the son of a United Empire Loyalist also named John Stinson. He originally came to Sophiasburgh Township in 1786 but later settled in Hallowell Township. In 1796, he was named justice of the peace for the Midland District. He also was a captain in the local militia and served during the War of 1812. He was elected to the 5th Parliament of Upper Canada for Prince Edward in an 1811 by-election and was reelected in 1812. With Joseph Willcocks, he opposed measures attempting to prepare the province for war that administrator Isaac Brock introduced in 1812.

He died in Hallowell Township in 1842.
