= Philip Sovereign =

Upper Canada politician

Philip Sovereign (1779 – July 2, 1833) was a farmer, judge and political figure in Upper Canada. He represented Norfolk in the Legislative Assembly of Upper Canada from 1808 to 1812.

He was born in the Thirteen Colonies, the son of Leonard Sovereign. Sovereign lived in Townsend Township from 1800 until 1814, when he moved to Trafalgar Township. He was a justice of the peace for the Gore District and a judge in the Surrogate Court for the London District. Sovereign died in Trafalgar Township.
