= James McNabb =

Canadian politician

See also James MacNabb

James McNabb (c. 1776 – April 5, 1820) was a businessman and political figure in Upper Canada.

He was born in Vermont about 1775. His father joined a loyalist regiment there in 1777 as a surgeon. He came to Quebec with his father and settled at Newark (Niagara-on-the-Lake) in 1796. He later moved to York (Toronto) and then Thurlow (Belleville) in 1800. In 1804, he built a sawmill and grist mill on Meyer's Creek (Moira River).

In 1808, he became a justice of the peace in the Midland District and, later than same year, was elected to the 5th Parliament of Upper Canada representing Hastings & Ameliasburgh Township.

During the War of 1812, he provided transport and supplies for the garrison at Kingston. After the war, he persuaded Lieutenant Governor Francis Gore to establish the new town of Belleville. In 1815, his right leg had to be amputated following an accident. In 1816, he was re-elected in Hastings & Ameliasburg. He died in 1820 while travelling between York and Belleville.
