= Michael Aikman (politician) =

Upper Canada politician and businessman

- Born: December 9, 1797; Upper Canada, British Empire
- Died: March 21, 1881 (aged 83); Barton Township, Ontario, Canada
- Occupations: Businessman, Political Figure
- Known for: Member of the Legislative Assembly of Upper Canada, Justice of the Peace
- Title: Captain in local militia
- Relatives: Egerton Ryerson (brother-in-law)

Michael Aikman (December 9, 1797 – March 21, 1881 in Barton Township) was a businessman and political figure in Upper Canada.

Aikman was born in Upper Canada in 1797, the son of a United Empire Loyalist. In 1833, he was named justice of the peace in the Gore District. He represented Wentworth in the Legislative Assembly of Upper Canada from 1836 to 1841. He served in the local militia, reaching the rank of captain, and was in charge of defending the frontier at Niagara in 1838. He was a member of the first board of directors for the Gore Bank.

His sister was Egerton Ryerson's first wife.
