= Jacob Rymal =

Upper Canada politician

Jacob Rymal (August 10, 1790 – September 4, 1856) was a farmer, carpenter and political figure in Upper Canada.

== Personal life ==
His parents were William Rymal and Barbara Long, who arrived in 1788 in Barton Township from Northampton County, Pennsylvania. He was born in Barton Township - the first non-native to be born in the area. He lived in Barton Township and was a sergeant in the York Militia during the War of 1812.

== Political career ==
Rymal represented Wentworth in the 12th Parliament of Upper Canada. He helped William Lyon Mackenzie escape after the Upper Canada Rebellion and was charged with treason, but later pardoned along with other participants in the Upper Canada Rebellion. He died in Barton Township in Canada West in 1856.

His son, Joseph Rymal, represented Wentworth South in the Legislative Assembly of the Province of Canada from 1857 to 1867 and in the House of Commons of Canada from 1867 to 1882.
