= Thomas Barnes Gough =

Upper Canada politician and merchant

Thomas Barnes Gough (c. 1760 – April, 1815) was an Irish-born merchant and political figure in Upper Canada. He represented the constituency of East York & Simcoe in theLegislative Assembly of Upper Canada in the 5th Parliament of Upper Canada that sat from 1809 to 1812.

Gough was educated in Bristol, England. He lived in York from 1801 until his death there in 1815.

Gough had contested the seat of Durham, Simcoe & 1st York during its second by-election held during the 4th Parliament in late 1806, and was defeated by Robert Thorpe, a judge of the Court of King's bench. Gough petitioned against Thorpe's election on the ground of Thorpe being a judge. The petition failed as there was no law preventing a judge from sitting in the assembly at the time.
