= Niagara District =

Former district in Upper Canada

- Former District in Upper Canada
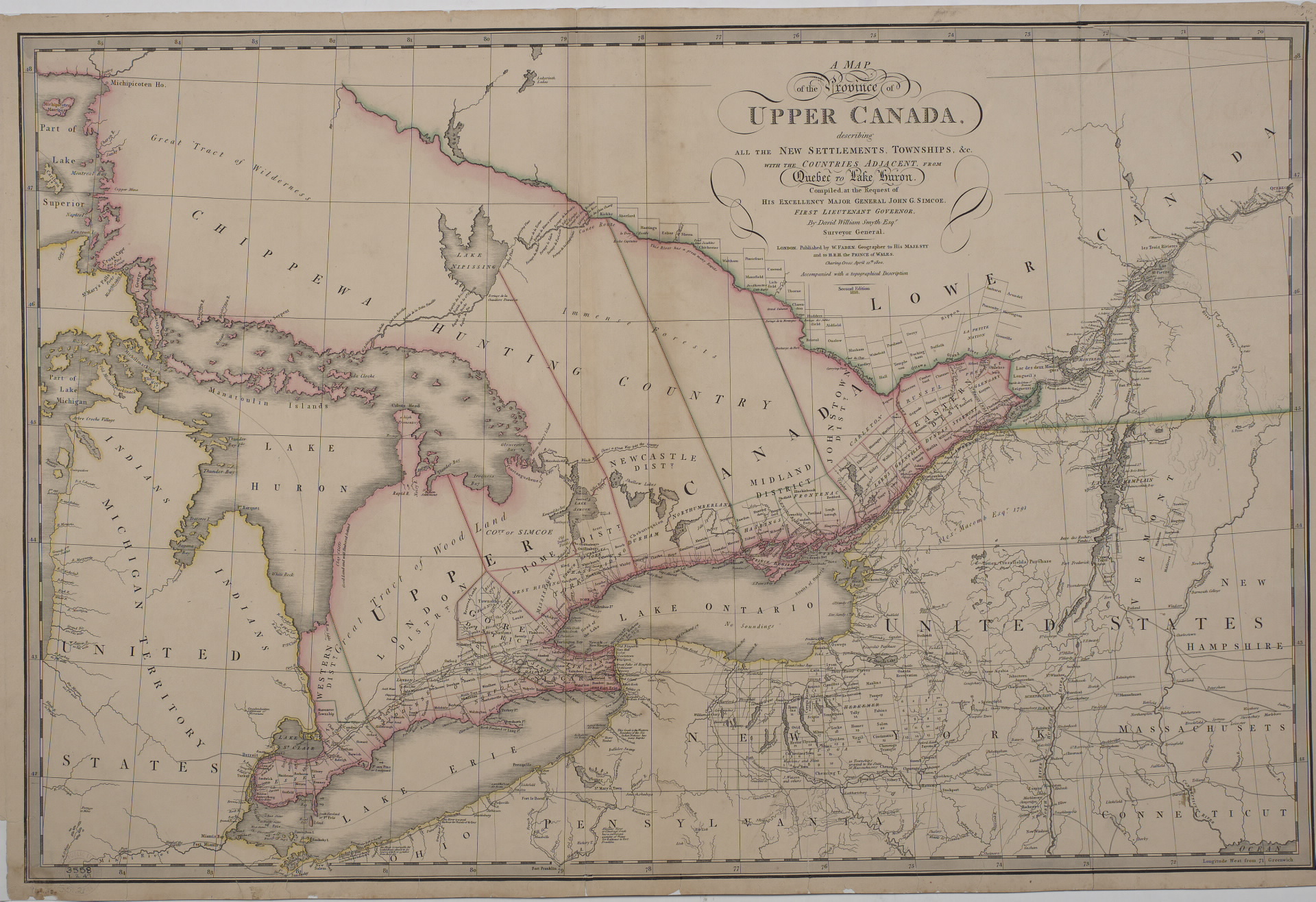
- Map of Upper Canada Identifying its districts, counties and townships (1818)
- Interactive map of Niagara District
- Coordinates: 42°58′N 79°43′W
- Established: 1798
- Dissolved: 1849

The Niagara District was a historic district in Upper Canada. Created in 1798 from the Home District, it existed until 1849.

== Historic evolution ==
The District was formed by an Act of the Parliament of Upper Canada in 1798, and was described as consisting of the following territory:

Organization of the Niagara District (1798)
Lincoln County (divided into surveyed townships)		Haldimand County	Other Lands
1st Riding	Clinton; Grimsby; Saltfleet; Barton; Ancaster; Glanford; Binbrook; Gainsborough; Caistor	...the tract of land on each side of the Grand River, now in possession of the Six Nations, and laying to the southward and south-east of Dundas Street...	...[together] with such of the islands of this Province lying in the River Niagara, or Lake Erie, as are wholly or in greater part adjacent [to the Counties of Lincoln and Haldimand], together with the Beach at the head of Lake Ontario, between the outlet of Burlington Bay and the township of Saltfleet, and together with the promontory of the said Burlington Bay and Coats Paradise...
2nd Riding	Newark (Note: together with the town of Newark, both renamed as Niagara (1798 Act, s. 28); in 1970 amalgamating to become Niagara-on-the-Lake.); Grantham; Louth	...the tract of land on each side of the Grand River, now in possession of the Six Nations, and laying to the southward and south-east of Dundas Street...	...[together] with such of the islands of this Province lying in the River Niagara, or Lake Erie, as are wholly or in greater part adjacent [to the Counties of Lincoln and Haldimand], together with the Beach at the head of Lake Ontario, between the outlet of Burlington Bay and the township of Saltfleet, and together with the promontory of the said Burlington Bay and Coats Paradise...
3rd Riding	Stamford; Thorold; Pelham	...the tract of land on each side of the Grand River, now in possession of the Six Nations, and laying to the southward and south-east of Dundas Street...	...[together] with such of the islands of this Province lying in the River Niagara, or Lake Erie, as are wholly or in greater part adjacent [to the Counties of Lincoln and Haldimand], together with the Beach at the head of Lake Ontario, between the outlet of Burlington Bay and the township of Saltfleet, and together with the promontory of the said Burlington Bay and Coats Paradise...
4th Riding	Bertie; Willoughby; Crowland; Humberstone; Wainfleet	...the tract of land on each side of the Grand River, now in possession of the Six Nations, and laying to the southward and south-east of Dundas Street...	...[together] with such of the islands of this Province lying in the River Niagara, or Lake Erie, as are wholly or in greater part adjacent [to the Counties of Lincoln and Haldimand], together with the Beach at the head of Lake Ontario, between the outlet of Burlington Bay and the township of Saltfleet, and together with the promontory of the said Burlington Bay and Coats Paradise...

In 1816, the following parts of the District were detached to form Wentworth County in the newly created Gore District:

...the townships of Saltfleet, Barton, Benbrook, Glanford, Ancaster, and the beach between Burlington bay and lake Ontario, and the promontory near Coot's Paradise, as so much of the county of Haldimand as lies between Dundas street and the Onondaga village, commonly called Bearsfoot, including said village...

Upon the passage of the Act of Union 1840, Lincoln County was reorganized into two ridings for electing members to the Legislative Assembly of the Province of Canada, with the 1st and 2nd Ridings becoming the North Riding, and the 3rd and 4th Ridings becoming the South Riding. The South Riding would be detached from Lincoln in 1845, forming the new Welland County.

The district was abolished in 1850, and was replaced by the United Counties of Lincoln, Welland and Haldimand.
