= Goldwin Smith =

British-born academic and historian (1823–1910)

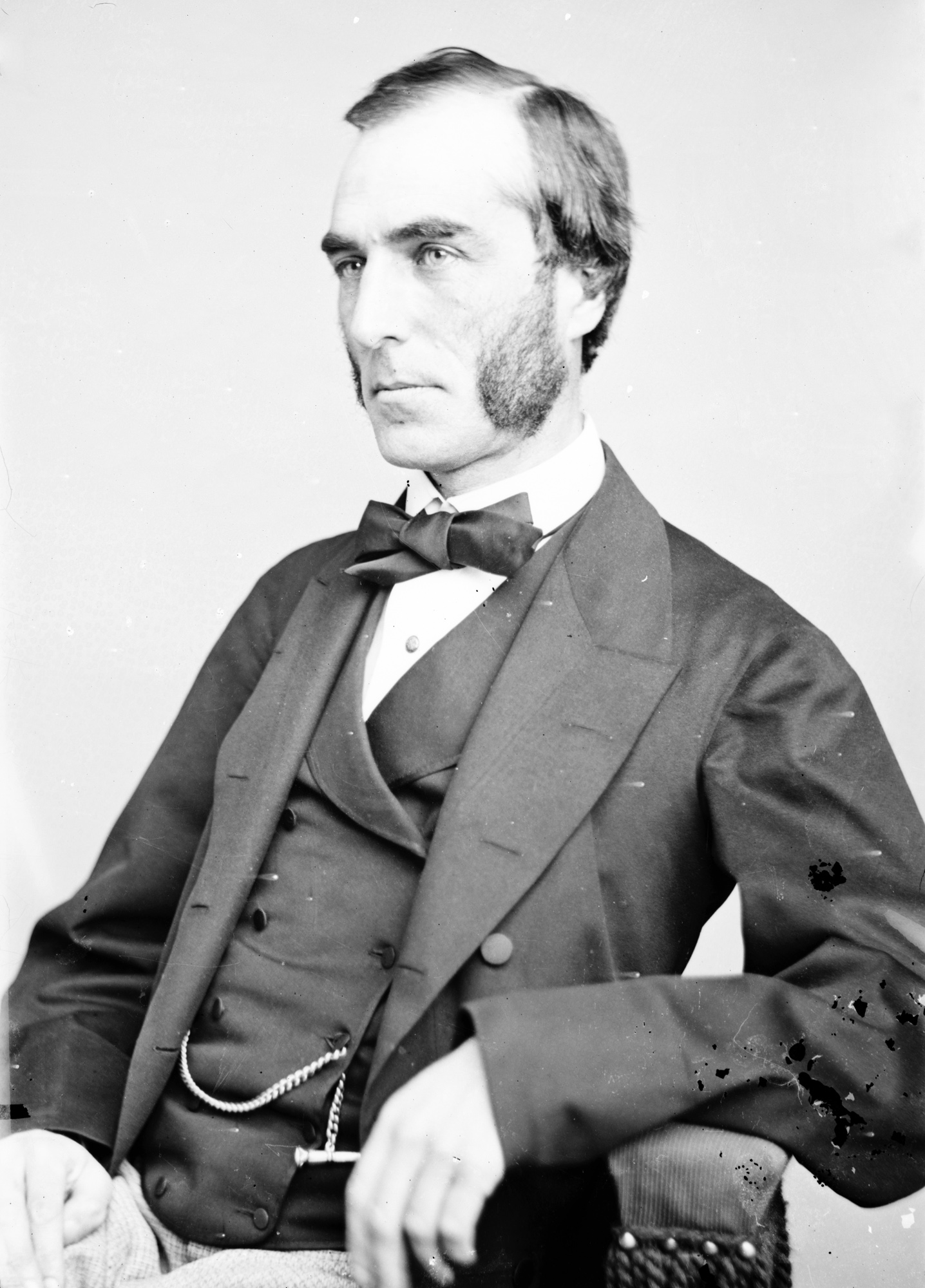
- Born: 13 August 1823; Reading, Berkshire
- Died: 7 June 1910 (aged 86); Toronto, Ontario
- Resting place: St. James Cemetery
- Education: Magdalen College, Oxford
- Occupations: Academic, historian
- Title: Regius Professor of Modern History
- Term: 1858–1866
- Predecessor: Henry Halford Vaughan
- Successor: William Stubbs
- Parent(s): Richard Pritchard Smith, Elizabeth Breton

Goldwin Smith (13 August 1823 – 7 June 1910) was a British-born academic and historian who was active in both Great Britain and North America. From 1856 to 1866, he was a professor of modern history at the University of Oxford. Smith taught at Cornell University from 1868 to 1872, and was instrumental in establishing the university's international reputation, but left when it began admitting female students. He is the namesake of Goldwin Smith Hall at Cornell University, and was outspoken regarding his often controversial political views. Smith was a supporter of the Union during the American Civil War and a critic of imperialism. He was also opposed to the Irish Home Rule movement and women's suffrage, along with holding Anglo-Saxonist and antisemitic views.

== Early life and education ==
Smith was born at Reading, Berkshire. He was educated at Eton College and Magdalen College, Oxford, and after a brilliant undergraduate career he was elected to a fellowship at University College, Oxford. He threw his energy into the cause of university reform with another fellow of University College, Arthur Penrhyn Stanley. On the royal commission of 1850 to inquire into the reform of the university, of which Stanley was secretary, Smith served as assistant-secretary; and he was then secretary to the commissioners appointed by the Oxford University Act 1854. His position as an authority on educational reform was further recognised by a seat on the Popular Education Commission of 1858. In 1868, when the question of reform at Oxford was again growing acute, he published a pamphlet, entitled The Reorganization of the University of Oxford.

In 1865, he led the University of Oxford opposition to a proposal to develop Cripley Meadow north of Oxford railway station for use as a major site of Great Western Railway (GWR) workshops. His father had been a director of GWR. Instead the workshops were located in Swindon. He was public with his pro-Northern sympathies during the American Civil War, notably in a speech at the Free Trade Hall, Manchester in April 1863 and his Letter to a Whig Member of the Southern Independence Association the following year.

Besides the Universities Tests Act 1871, which abolished religious tests, many of the reforms suggested, such as the revival of the faculties, the reorganisation of the professoriate, the abolition of celibacy as a condition of the tenure of fellowships, and the combination of the colleges for lecturing purposes, were incorporated in the Universities of Oxford and Cambridge Act 1877, or subsequently adopted by the university. Smith gave the counsel of perfection that "pass" examinations ought to cease; but he recognised that this change "must wait on the reorganization of the educational institutions immediately below the university, at which a passman ought to finish his career." His aspiration that colonists and Americans should be attracted to Oxford was later realised by the will of Cecil Rhodes. On what is perhaps the vital problem of modern education, the question of ancient versus modern languages, he pronounced that the latter "are indispensable accomplishments, but they do not form a high mental training" – an opinion entitled to peculiar respect as coming from a president of the Modern Language Association.

== Oxford years ==
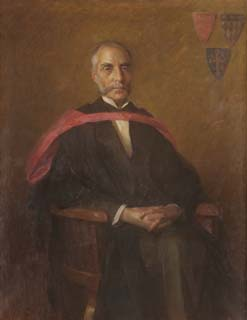
Portrait of Goldwin Smith, by Sir Edmund Wyly Grier, 1894

He held the Regius professorship of Modern History at Oxford from 1858 to 1866, that "ancient history, besides the still unequalled excellence of the writers, is the 'best instrument for cultivating the historical sense." As a historian, indeed, he left no abiding work; the multiplicity of his interests prevented him from concentrating on any one subject. His chief historical writings – The United Kingdom: a Political History (1899), and The United States: an Outline of Political History (1893) — though based on thorough familiarity with their subject, make no claim to original research, but are remarkable examples of terse and brilliant narrative. He was elected as a member of the American Philosophical Society in 1865.

The outbreak of the American Civil War proved a turning point in his life. He quickly began championing the Union cause, and his pamphlets, especially one entitled Does the Bible Sanction American Slavery? (1863), played a prominent part in hardening British public opinion against the Confederate States of America. Visiting America on a lecture tour in 1864, he received an enthusiastic welcome, and was entertained at a public banquet in New York. Andrew Dickson White, president of Cornell University at Ithaca, New York, invited him to take up a teaching post at the newly founded institution. But it was not until a dramatic change in Smith's personal circumstances that led to his departure from England in 1868, that he took up the post. He had resigned his chair at Oxford in 1866 in order to attend to his father, who had suffered permanent injury in a railway accident. In the autumn of 1867, when Smith was briefly absent, his father took his own life. Possibly blaming himself for the tragedy, and now without an Oxford appointment, he decided to move to North America.

== Cornell years ==
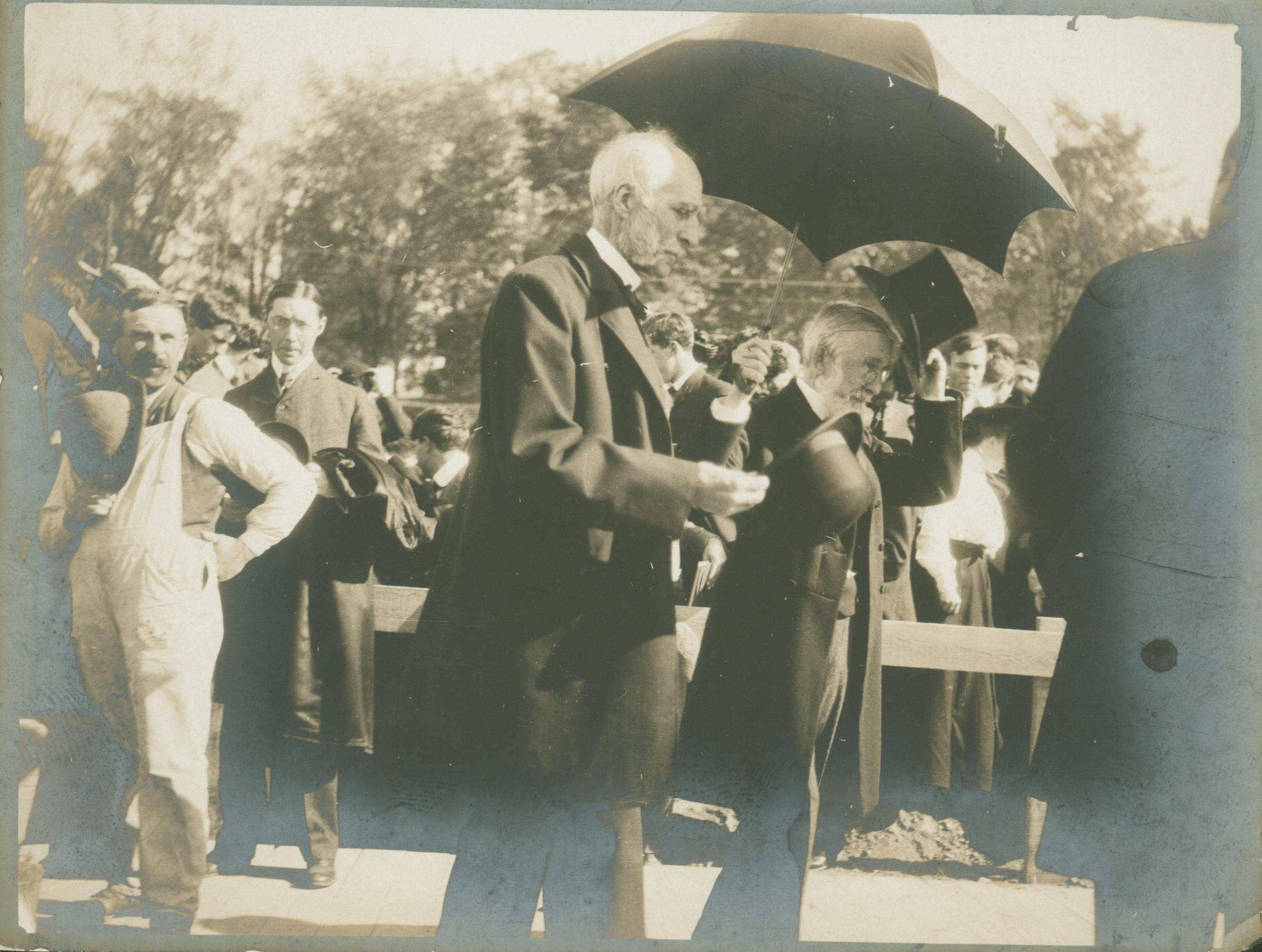
Goldwin Smith (center) and Andrew Dickson White (behind him, with top hat) at the opening of Goldwin Smith Hall, 1906

Smith's time at Cornell was brief, but his impact there was significant. He held the professorship of English and Constitutional History in the Department of History at Cornell University from 1868 to 1872. The addition of Smith to Cornell's faculty gave the newly opened university "instant credibility." Smith was something of an academic celebrity, and his lectures were sometimes printed in New York newspapers. During Smith's time at Cornell he accepted no salary and provided much financial support to the institution.

In 1869, he had his personal library shipped from England and donated to the university. He lived at Cascadilla Hall among the students, and was much beloved by them. In 1871 Smith moved to Toronto to live with relatives, but retained an honorary professorship at Cornell and returned to campus frequently to lecture. When he did, he insisted on staying with the students at Cascadilla Hall rather than in a hotel. Smith bequeathed the bulk of his estate to the university in his will.

Smith's abrupt departure from Cornell was credited to several factors, including the Ithaca weather, Cornell's geographic isolation, Smith's health, and political tensions between Britain and America. But the decisive factor in Smith's departure was the university's decision to admit women. Goldwin Smith told White that admitting women would cause Cornell to "sink at once from the rank of a University to that of an Oberlin (Note: Note: Oberlin College had been coeducational since its founding in 1833) or a high school" and that all "hopes of future greatness" would be lost by admitting women.

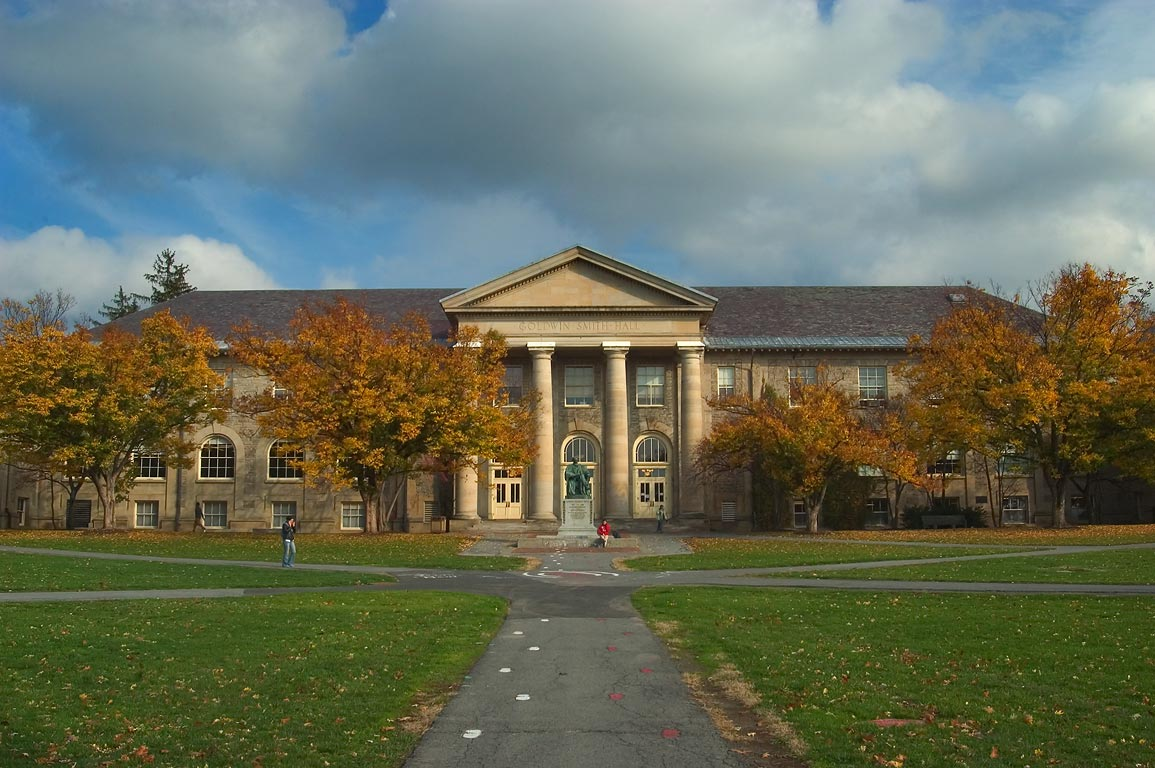
Goldwin Smith Hall

On 19 June 1906, Goldwin Smith Hall was dedicated, at the time Cornell's largest building and its first building dedicated to the humanities, as well as the first home to the College of Arts and Sciences. Smith personally laid the cornerstone for the building in October 1904 and attended the 1906 dedication. The Cornell Alumni News observed on the occasion, "To attempt to express even in a measure the reverence and affection which all Cornellians feel for Goldwin Smith would be attempting a hopeless task. His presence here is appreciated as the presence of no other person could be."

== Life in Toronto ==
Smith settled permanently in Toronto in the 1870s after marrying Harriet Elizabeth (née Dixon), widow of William Henry Boulton, and lived at her family home, The Grange, for the rest of his life.

While resident in the city he became a prominent man of letters and controversialist: he helped launch and write for the Canadian Monthly and National Review (founded by G. Mercer Adam "with the co-operation of Prof. Goldwin Smith"), issued a one-man monthly, The Bystander (1880–81), and then became part-proprietor and a leading contributor to the weekly The Week (from December 1883).

Alongside his journalism, Smith took part in Toronto's civic and academic life. He advocated university reform, regularly attended University of Toronto functions, and in 1905 accepted appointment to a royal commission on the university; a 1906 act created a new board of governors on which he served. He also examined classics at Upper Canada College, reflecting his continued engagement with local education.

In 1896 Smith acquired a controlling interest in the Canada Farmers' Sun (Toronto)—often referred to simply as The Farmer's Sun—using it to argue for free trade and other positions he championed in his later years.

He was elected a Foreign Member of the American Antiquarian Society in October 1893. He continued to publish pamphlets and letters (including occasional pieces in the Spectator) and to circulate reminiscences such as My Memory of Gladstone (1904).

Smith died at The Grange on 7 June 1910.

== Political views ==
He continued to take an active interest in English politics. As a Liberal, he opposed Benjamin Disraeli, and was a strong supporter of Irish Disestablishment, but refused to follow Gladstone in accepting Home Rule. He expressly stated that "if he ever had a political leader, his leader was John Bright, not Mr Gladstone." Causes that he powerfully attacked were Prohibition, female suffrage and state socialism, as he discussed in his Essays on Questions of the Day (revised edition, 1894). He also published sympathetic monographs on William Cowper and Jane Austen, and attempted verse in Bay Leaves and Specimens of Greek Tragedy. In his Guesses at the Riddle of Existence (1897), he abandoned the faith in Christianity that he had expressed in his lecture of 1861, Historical Progress, in which he forecast the speedy reunion of Christendom on the "basis of free conviction," and wrote in a spirit "not of Agnosticism, if Agnosticism imports despair of spiritual truth, but of free and hopeful inquiry, the way for which it is necessary to clear by removing the wreck of that upon which we can found our faith no more."

=== Anglo-Saxonism ===
Smith is considered by historian Edward P. Kohn to be a "devout Anglo-Saxonist", a racial belief system developed by British and American intellectuals, politicians and academics in the 19th century. In his view, Smith defined the "Anglo-Saxon race" as not necessarily being limited to English people, but extended to the Welsh and Lowland Scots, though not the Irish. Speaking in 1886, he proclaimed that he was standing "by the side of John Bright against the dismemberment of the great Anglo-Saxon community of the West, as I now stand against the dismemberment of the great Anglo-Saxon community of the East." These words formed the key to his views of the future of the British Empire and he was a leading member of the anti-imperialist "Little Englander" movement.

Smith thought that Canada was destined by geography to become part of the United States. In his view, separated by artificial north–south barriers, into zones communicating naturally with adjoining portions of the United States, Canada was an artificially constructed and badly-governed nation. In his view, it would eventually break away from the British Empire, and the "Anglo-Saxons" of the North American continent would become one nation. These views are most fully developed in his work Canada and the Canadian Question (1891). Smith's views on the future of Canada–United States relations were criticised by Canadian priest George Monro Grant in the Canadian Magazine.

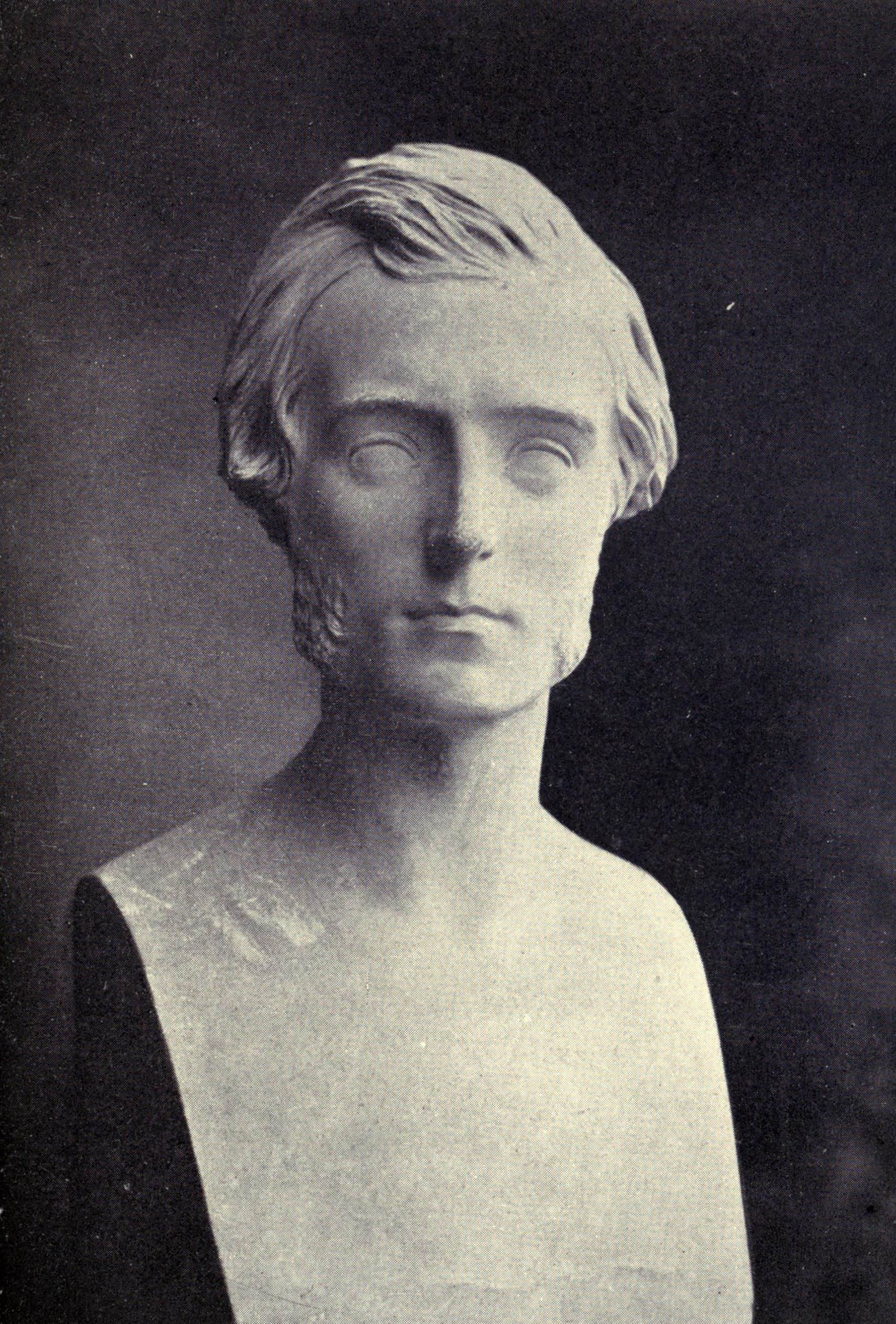
Bust of Goldwin Smith, by Alexander Munro, 1866

=== Imperialism ===
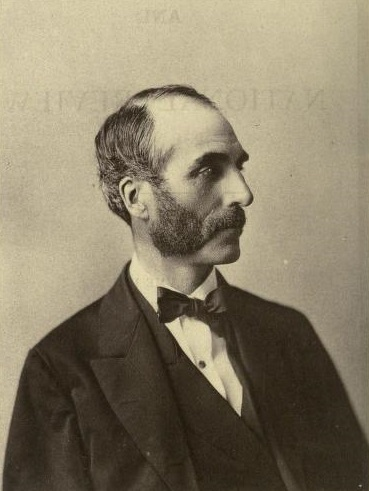
Goldwin Smith, photo by Notman & Fraser

Smith identified as an anti-imperialist, describing himself as "anti-Imperialistic to the core". Despite this, he admired aspects of the British Empire; speaking on the topic of British rule in India, Smith claimed that "it is the noblest the world has seen. ... Never had there been such an attempt to make conquest the servant of civilization. About keeping India there is no question. England has a real duty there." Smith remained resolutely opposed to Britain granting more representative government to India, expressing fear that this would lead to a "murderous anarchy."

When the Second Boer War (1899–1902) broke out, Smith published several articles in the Canadian press and a book In The Court of History: An Apology of Canadians Opposed to the Boer War (1902) expressing his opposition to the war. Arguing against British involvement in the war on pacifist grounds, Smith's views were uncommon among the English Canadian community of the period. Smith published another anti-imperialist work in 1902, Commonwealth or Empire?, arguing against the United States assuming an imperialistic foreign policy in the aftermath of its victory in the Spanish–American War.

=== Antisemitism ===
Smith held strong antisemitic views. Described by McMaster University professor Alan Mendelson as "the most vicious anti-Semite in the English-speaking world", Smith referred to Jews as "parasites" who absorb "the wealth of the community without adding to it". Research by Glenn C. Altschuler and Isaac Kramnick has studied Smith's writings on Jews, which claimed that they were responsible for a form of "repulsion" they provoked in others, due to his assertion of their "peculiar character and habits", including a "preoccupation with money-making", which made them "enemies of civilization". He also denigrated brit milah, a Jewish ritual of circumcision, as a "barborous rite", and proposed either culturally assimilating Jews or deporting them to Palestine as a solution to the "Jewish problem".

Smith wrote that "The Jewish objective has always been the same, since Roman times. We regard our race as superior to all humanity, and we do not seek our ultimate union with other races, but our final triumph over them." He had a strong influence on William Lyon Mackenzie King and Henri Bourassa. He proposed in other writings that Jews and Arabs were of the same race. He also believed that Islamic oppression of non-Muslims was for economic factors. In December 2020, the Cornell University Board of Trustees voted to remove Smith's name from the honorific titles of twelve professors at Cornell. The Board took this action in recognition of Smith's "racist, sexist and anti-Semitic" views. The Board declined to rename Goldwin Smith Hall.

=== Antisuffragism ===
Smith was strongly opposed to the women's suffrage movement, both in the United Kingdom and in the United States. In 1874, he published a treatise in Macmillan's Magazine titled Female Suffrage in opposition to a proposed bill on women's suffrage. In the treatise, he explained his view that "The very foundations of society are touched when change is proposed in the relations of the sexes."

== Legacy ==
Goldwin Smith is credited with the quote "Above all nations is humanity," an inscription that was engraved in a stone bench he offered to Cornell in May 1871. The bench sits in front of Goldwin Smith Hall, named in his honour. This quote is the motto of the University of Hawaiʻi and other institutions around the world (for example, the Cosmopolitan Club at the University of Illinois at Urbana–Champaign).

Another stone bench inscribed with the motto, sits on the campus of Boğaziçi University in Istanbul. It sits with a clear view down onto the city.

After his death, a plaque in his memory was erected outside his birthplace in the town centre of Reading. This still exists, outside the entrance to the Harris Arcade.

== See also ==
- Irish question
- Jewish question

== Works ==
- 1861 – Rational Religion, and the Rationalistic Objections of the Bampton Lectures for 1858.
- 1861 – The Foundation of the American Colonies.
- 1861 – The Study of History.
- 1863 – The Empire: A Series of Letters.
- 1863 – On Some Supposed Consequences of the Doctrine of Historical Progress.
- 1864 – Does the Bible Sanction American Slavery?
- 1864 – A Letter to a Whig Member of the Southern Independence Association.
- 1864 – A Plea for the Abolition of Tests in the University of Oxford.
- 1865 – The Civil War in America.
- 1865 – England and America.
- 1865 – Lectures on the Study of History.
- 1867 – Three English Statesmen.
- 1868 – The Reorganization of the University of Oxford.
- 1871 – The European Crisis of 1870.
- 1878 – The Political Destiny of Canada.
- 1880 – Cowper.
- 1881 – Lectures and Essays.
- 1882 – Great Britain, America, and Ireland.
- 1883 – False Hopes: Or, Fallacies, Socialistic and Semi-socialistic.
- 1885 – Temperance versus Prohibition.
- 1886 – Dismemberment no Remedy: An address.
- 1887 – Schism in the Anglo-Saxon Race.
- 1888 – Keeping Christmas.
- 1888 – A Trip to England.
- 1890 – Life of Jane Austen.
- 1891 – Canada and the Canadian Question.
- 1891 – Loyalty.
- 1893 – Essays on Questions of the Day.
- 1893 – Oxford and Her Colleges.
- 1893 – The United States: An Outline of Political History.
- 1893 – Bay Leaves: Translations from the Latin Poets.
- 1893 – Specimens of Greek Tragedy: Euripides.
- 1894 – Specimens of Greek Tragedy: Aeschylus and Sophocles.
- 1896 – Guesses at the Riddle of Existence, and Other Essays on Kindred Subjects.
- 1899 – Shakespeare: The Man.
- 1899 – The United Kingdom: A Political History.
- 1901 – Commonwealth or Empire?
- 1902 – In the Court of History.
- 1903 – The Founder of Christendom.
- 1904 – The Early Days of Cornell.
- 1904 – Lines of Religious Inquiry.
- 1904 – My Memory of Gladstone.
- 1905 – Irish History and the Irish Question.
- 1906 – In Quest of Light.
- 1906 – Labour and Capital.
- 1908 – No Refuge but in Truth.
- 1910 – Reminiscences.

=== Articles ===
- "Has England an Interest in the Disruption of the American Union?," Macmillan's Magazine, Volmne X, May/October 1864.
- "England and America," The Atlantic Monthly, Volume XIV, Issue 86, December 1864.
- "President Lincoln," Macmillan's Magazine, Volume XI, November 1864/April 1865.
- "The Proposed Constitution for British North America," Macmillan's Magazine, Volume XI, November 1864/April 1865.
- "The University of Oxford," Harper's New Monthly Magazine, Volume XXX, Issue 180, May 1865; Part II, Volume XXXI, Issue 181, June 1865.
- "Richard Cobden," Macmillan's Magazine, Volume XII, May/October 1865.
- "The Death of President Lincoln," Macmillan's Magazine, Volume XII, May/October 1865.
- "An Englishman in Normandy," The Atlantic Monthly, Volume XVIII, Issue 105, July 1866.
- "The Last Republicans of Rome," Macmillan's Magazine, Volume XVII, November 1867/April 1868.
- "The Revolution in England," The North American Review, Volume 108, Number 222, January 1869.
- "War Under the Old Testament," Advocate of Peace (1847–1884), New Series, Volume 1, Number 6, June 1869.
- "The Study of History," The Atlantic Monthly, Volume XXV, Issue 147, January 1870.
- "The Ecclesiastical Crisis in England," The North American Review, Volume 110, Number 226, January 1870.
- "The Aim of Reform," The Fortnightly Review, Volume XVII, 1872.
- "The Recent Struggle in the Parliament of Ontario," The Canadian Monthly and National Review, Volume I, 1872.
- "The Woman's Rights Movement," The Canadian Monthly and National Review, Volume I, 1872.
- "The Late Session of the Parliament of Ontario," The Canadian Monthly and National Review, Volume I, 1872.
- "Alfredus Rex Fundator," The Canadian Monthly and National Review, Volume II, July/December 1872.
- "The Labour Movement," Contemporary Review, Volume XXI, December 1872/May 1873.
- "The Irish Question," The Canadian Monthly and National Review, Volume III, January/June 1873.
- "What is Culpable Luxury?," Canadian Monthly and National Review, Volume III, January/June 1873.
- "Cowper," Canadian Monthly and National Review, Volume IV, July/December 1873.
- "Female Suffrage" Macmillan's Magazine, Volume XXX, May/October 1874 (separately republished, 1875).
- "The Immortality of the Soul," The Canadian Monthly and National Review, Volume IX, 1876.
- "The Decline of party Government" Macmillan's Magazine, 1877 (reprinted in Fleming, An Appeal for Essays on Rectification of Parliament (1892), page 66)
- "Falkland and the Puritans: A Reply to Mr. Matthew Arnold," The Contemporary Review, Volume XXIX, December 1876/May 1877.
- "The Labour War in the United States," The Contemporary Review, Volume XXX, September 1877.
- "The Slaveowner and the Turk," The Contemporary Review, Volume XXX, November 1877.
- "The Ninety Years' Agony of France," The Contemporary Review, Volume XXXI, December 1877/March 1878.
- "England's Abandonment of the Protectorate of Turkey," The Contemporary Review, Volume XXXI, December 1877/March 1878.
- "Can Jews be Patriots?," The Nineteenth Century, Volume III, January/June 1878.
- "The Eastern Crisis," Eclectic Magazine, Volume XXVIII, July/December 1878.
- "The Greatness of the Romans," The Contemporary Review, Volume XXXII, May 1878.
- "Berlin and Afghanistan", The Canadian Monthly and National Review, Volume I, December 1878.
- "The Greatness of England," The Contemporary Review, Volume XXXIV, December 1878.
- "Is Universal Suffrage a Failure?," The Atlantic Monthly, Volume XLIII, Issue 255, January 1879.
- "The Prospect of a Moral Interregnum," The Atlantic Monthly, Volume XLIV, Issue 265, November 1879.
- "Pessimism," The Atlantic Monthly, Volume XLV, Issue 268, February 1880.
- "Canada and the United States," The North American Review, Volume 131, Number 284, July 1880.
- "The Canadian Tariff," The Contemporary Review, Volume XL, July/December 1881.
- "The Jewish Question," The Nineteenth Century, Volume X, July/December 1881.
- "Has Science Yet Found a New Basis for Morality?," The Contemporary Review, Volume XLI, January/June 1882.
- "Parliament and the Rebellion in Ireland," The Contemporary Review, Volume XLI, January/June 1882.
- "The Machinery of Elective Government," The Nineteenth Century, Volume XI, January/June 1882.
- "Peel and Cobden," The Nineteenth Century, Volume XI, January/June 1882.
- "The 'Home Rule' Fallacy," The Nineteenth Century, Volume XII, July/December 1882.
- "The Jews: A Deferred Rejoinder," The Nineteenth Century, Volume XII, July/December 1882.
- "Why Send More Irish to America?," The Nineteenth Century, Volume XIII, January/June 1883.
- "Evolutionary Ethics and Christianity," The Contemporary Review, Volume XLIV, December 1883.
- "The Conflict with the Lords," The Contemporary Review, Volume XLVI, September 1884.
- "The Fallacy of Irish History," Choice Literature, Volume III, 1885.
- "The Organization of Democracy," The Eclectic Magazine, Volmne XLI, 1885.
- "The Expansion of England," Choice Literature, Volume III, 1885.
- "The Administration of Ireland," The Contemporary Review, Volume XLVIII, July/December 1885.
- "The Capital of the United States," Macmillan's Magazine, Volume LIV, May/October 1886.
- "Election Notes," Macmillan's Magazine, Volume LIV, May/October 1886.
- "England Revited," Macmillan's Magazine, Volume LIV, May/October 1886.
- "John Bunyan," The Contemporary Review, Volume L, October 1886.
- "The Political History of Canada," The Nineteenth Century, Volume XX, July/December 1886.
- "The Moral of the Late Crisis," The Nineteenth Century, Volume XX, July/December 1886.
- "The Canadian Constitution," The Contemporary Review, Volume LII, July 1887.
- "The Railway Question in Manitoba," The Contemporary Review, Volume LII, October 1887.
- "American Statesmen," Part II, The Nineteenth Century, Volume XXIII, January/June 1888.
- "The Policy of Aggrandizement," The Popular Science Monthly, Supplement, 1888.
- "Shakespeare's Religion and Politics," Macmillan's Magazine, Volume LIX, November 1888/April 1889.
- "The American Commonwealth," Macmillan's Magazine, Volume LIX, November 1888/April 1889.
- "Prohibitionism in Canada and the United States," Macmillan's Magazine, Volume LIX, November 1888/April 1889.
- "Progress and War," Macmillan's Magazine, Volume LX, May/October 1889.
- "Canada and the Jesuits," Macmillan's Magazine, Volume LX, May/October 1889.
- "Prophets of Unrest," The Forum, Vol IX, August 1889.
- "Woman's Place in the State," The Forum, Volume IX, January 1890.
- "The Hatred of England," The North American Review, Volume 150, Number 402, May 1890.
- "Canada through English Eyes," The Forum, May 1890.
- "A True Captain of Industry: Thomas Brassey," The Methodist Magazine, Volume XXXI, January/June 1890.
- "A Moral Crusader," Macmillan's Magazine, Volume LXII, May/October 1890.
- "The Two Mr. Pitts," Macmillan's Magazine, Volume LXII, May/October 1890.
- "The American Tariff," Macmillan's Magazine, Volume LXII, May/October 1890.
- "Exit McKinley," Macmillan's Magazine, Volume LXIII, November 1890/April 1891.
- "Mr. Lecky on Pitt," Macmillan's Magazine, Volume LXIII, November 1890/April 1891.
- "Will Morality Survive Religion?," The Forum, April 1891.
- "New Light on the Jewish Question," The North American Review, Volume 153, Number 417, August 1891.
- "Burke's Defence of Party" from the North American Review (1892) (reprinted in Fleming, An Appeal for Essays on Rectification of Parliament (1892), page 151)
- "Party Government on Its Trial," The North American Review, Volume 154, Number 426, May 1892.
- "The Contest for the Presidency," The Nineteenth Century, Volume XXXII, July/December 1892.
- "Anglo-Saxon Union: A Response to Mr. Carnegie," The North American Review, Volume 157, Number 441, August 1893.
- "The Situation at Washington," The Nineteenth Century, Volume XXXIV, July/December 1893.
- "Problems and Perils of British Politics," The North American Review, Volume 159, Number 452, July 1894.
- "Arthur Stanley," The Nineteenth Century, Volume XXXV, January/June 1894.
- "The Impending Revolution," The Nineteenth Century, Volume XXXV, January/June 1894.
- "The House of Lords: Reform by 'Resolution'," The Nineteenth Century, Volume XXXV, January/June 1894.
- "Froude," The North American Review, December 1894.
- "Our Situation Viewed from Without," The North American Review, Volume. 160, Number 462, May 1895.
- "The Colonial Conference," The Contemporary Review, Volume LXVII, January/June 1895.
- "The Manchester School," The Contemporary Review, Volume LXVII, January/June 1895.
- "Guesses at the Riddle of Existence," The North American Review, Volume 161, Number 465, August 1895.
- "The Canadian Copyright Bill," The Canadian Magazine, Volume V, 1895.
- "Christianity's Millstone," The North American Review, Volmne 161, Number 469, December 1895.
- "The Manitoba Schools Question," The Forum, March 1896.
- "Is There Another Life?," The Forum, July 1896.
- "A Reply," The Canadian Magazine, Volume VII, 1986.
- "The Brewing of the Storm," The Forum, December 1896.
- "A Constitutional Misfit," The North American Review, Volume 164, Number 486, May 1897.
- "The Disintegration of Political Party," The North American Review, Volmne 164, Number 487, June 1897.
- "Are Our School Histories Anglophobe?," The North American Review, Volume 165, Number 490, September 1897.
- "Not Dead Yet!," The Canadian Magazine, Volume X, Number 2, December 1897.
- "Is the Constitution Outworn?," The North American Review, Volume 166, Number 496, March 1898.
- "The Origin of Morality," The North American Review, Volume 167, Number 503, October 1898.
- "The Moral of the Cuban War," The Forum, November 1898.
- "American Histories." In: Among My Books. New York: Longmans, Green & Co., 1899.
- "Imperialism in the United States," The Contemporary Review, Volume LXXV, May 1899.
- "The Failure of Party Government," The Nineteenth Century, Volume XLV, January/June 1899.
- "War as a Moral Medicine," The Atlantic Monthly, Volume LXXXVI, Issue 518, December 1900.
- "The Last Phase of Napoleon," The Atlantic Monthly, Volume LXXXVII, Issue 520, February 1901.
- "The Irish Question," The North American Review, Volume 172, Number 535, June 1901.
- "Wellington," The Atlantic Monthly, Volume LXXXVII, Issue 524, June 1901.
- "The Political Situation in England," The North American Review, Volume 173, Number 538, September 1901.
- "The Age of Homer," The American Historical Review, Volume VII, Number 1, October 1901.
- "The Confederate Cruisers," The Independent, Volume LIV, 1902.
- "A Gallery of Portraits," The North American Review, Volume 176, Number 557, April 1903.
- "Is Morality Shifting in its Foundation?," The Booklovers Magazine, Volume I, Number 1, 1903.
- "Strenuous Life," The Independent, Volume LV, 1903.
- "Mr. Morley's Life of Gladstone," Part II, The North American Review, Volume 177, Number 565, December 1903.
- "The Immortality of the Soul," The North American Review, Volume 178, Number 570, May 1904.
- "English Poetry and English History," The American Historical Review, Volume 10, Number 1, October 1904.
- "City Government," The Independent, Volume LVIII, 1905.
- "The Marquis of Dufferin and Ava," The Independent, Volume LVIII, 1905.
- "The Treatment of History," The American Historical Review, Volume 10, Number 3, April 1905.
- "The Passing of the Household," The Independent, Volume LIX, 1905.
- "Are We 'Re-Barbarized'"?, The Independent, Volume LIX, 1905.
- "Burke on Party," The American Historical Review, Volume 11, Number 1, October 1905.
- "Is it Religious Persecution?," The Independent, Volume LX, 1906.
- "The Impending Conflict," The Independent, Volume LXI, 1906.
- "British Empire in India," The North American Review, Volume 183, Number 598, 7 September 1906.
- "Chief-Justice Clark on the Defects of the American Constitution," The North American Review, Volume 183, Number 602, 2 November 1906.
- "The Stage of Former Days," The Canadian Magazine, Volume XXVIII, November 1906/April 1907.
- "Toronto: A Turn in its History," The Canadian Magazine, Volume XXVIII, November 1906/April 1907.
- "The Church Question in France," The Outlook, 2 February 1907.
- "The Perils of the Republic," The North American Review, Volume 184, Number 610, 1 March 1907.
- "Ireland," The North American Review, Volume 185, Number 614, 3 May 1907.
- "Party Government", The Canadian Magazine, Volume XXIX, Number 4, August 1907.
- "Evolution, Immortality and the Christian Religion: A Reply," The North American Review, Volume 186, Number 623, October 1907.
- "Magdalen College, Oxford," The Outlook, 14 September 1907.
- "Reform of the Senate," The Canadian Magazine, Volume XXX, Number 6, April 1908.
- "The Religious Situation," The North American Review, Volume 187, Number 629, April 1908.
- "The Socialist Manifesto," The Canadian Magazine, Volume XXXI, May/October 1908.
- "War," The Canadian Magazine, Volume XXXI, May/October 1908.
- "Party Government," The North American Review, Volume 188, Number 636, November 1908.
- "Has England Wronged Ireland?," The Nineteenth Century and After, Volume LXIV, July/December 1908.
- "The Crisis in India," The Canadian Magazine, Volume XXXII, November 1908/April 1909.
- "Labour and Socialism," The Canadian Magazine, Volume XXXII, November 1908/April 1909.
- "The American Civil War," McClure's Magazine, September 1910.
- "The Founding of Cornell University and His Introduction into Washington Society," McClure's Magazine, October 1910.
- "Last Words on Ireland," The Nineteenth Century and After, Volume LXVIII, July/December 1910.
- "My Early Connection with London Journalism," The Canadian Magazine, Volume XXXVI, November 1910/April 1911.

=== Miscellany ===
- Lee-Warner, William (1911). "Dalhousie, James Andrew Broun Ramsay, 1st Marquess of" . In Chisholm, Hugh (ed.). Encyclopædia Britannica. Vol. 7 (11th ed.). Cambridge University Press. pp. 764–765.
- Parker, Charles Stuart (1911). "Peel, Sir Robert" . In Chisholm, Hugh (ed.). Encyclopædia Britannica. Vol. 21 (11th ed.). Cambridge University Press. pp. 40–44.
- "Letters of Goldwin Smith to Charles Eliot Norton", Proceedings of the Massachusetts Historical Society 49, October 1915/June 1916, pages 106–160.
