= United Counties of Lincoln, Welland and Haldimand, Ontario =

The United Counties of Lincoln, Welland and Haldimand was a historic county in the Canadian province of Ontario.

In 1849 parts of the counties of Lincoln, Welland and Haldimand were merged to one united county.

These counties later separated to form single counties.

Lincoln County and Welland County merged in 1970 to form the Regional Municipality of Niagara, Ontario.

Haldimand merged with Norfolk twice and the final time (1974) it created the Regional Municipality of Haldimand-Norfolk, Ontario.
