= William Rymal =

William Rymal (b. November 19, 1759 at Upper Bethel Township, Northampton County, Pennsylvania – d. May 25, 1852 in Hamilton, Ontario, buried at Barton Union (Rymal) Cemetery) was one of the earliest settlers on the Hamilton, Ontario mountain.

Rymal owned land on the Hamilton Mountain bounded by what is now Limeridge Road and Fennel Avenue. He also owned 300 acres (1.2 km^{2}) on Barton township (present day downtown Hamilton) and 200 acres (0.8 km^{2}) in Ancaster.

== Tribute ==
- Rymal Road in the city of Hamilton, Ontario named after him.
