= John Brownell (politician) =

Upper Canada politician

John Brownell (1765 – December 27, 1809) was a farmer and political figure in Upper Canada. He represented Stormont & Russell in the Legislative Assembly of Upper Canada from 1808 to 1809.

He was born in Dutchess County, New York. He was taken prisoner during the American Revolution and later settled in Osnabruck Township. Brownell married Hannah Hogoboam. He served as a justice of the peace for the Eastern District. Brownell died in office in Osnabruck Township in 1809.
