= Saltfleet Township =

Coordinates: 43°12′00″N 79°43′03″W

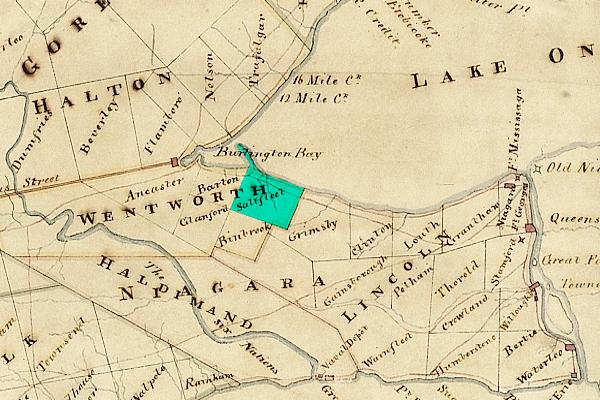
An 1818 map with the location of Saltfleet Township highlighted.

Saltfleet Township is a geographic township in Hamilton, Ontario, Canada, on the south shore of Lake Ontario.

The township was established originally in the then Upper Canada. In 1974, it was amalgamated with the village of Stoney Creek to form the town of Stoney Creek. Stoney Creek itself was amalgamated with the City of Hamilton in 2001.

== See also ==
- List of townships in Ontario
