= Gore District, Upper Canada =

Historic district in Upper Canada

Coordinates: 43°15′N 79°52′W

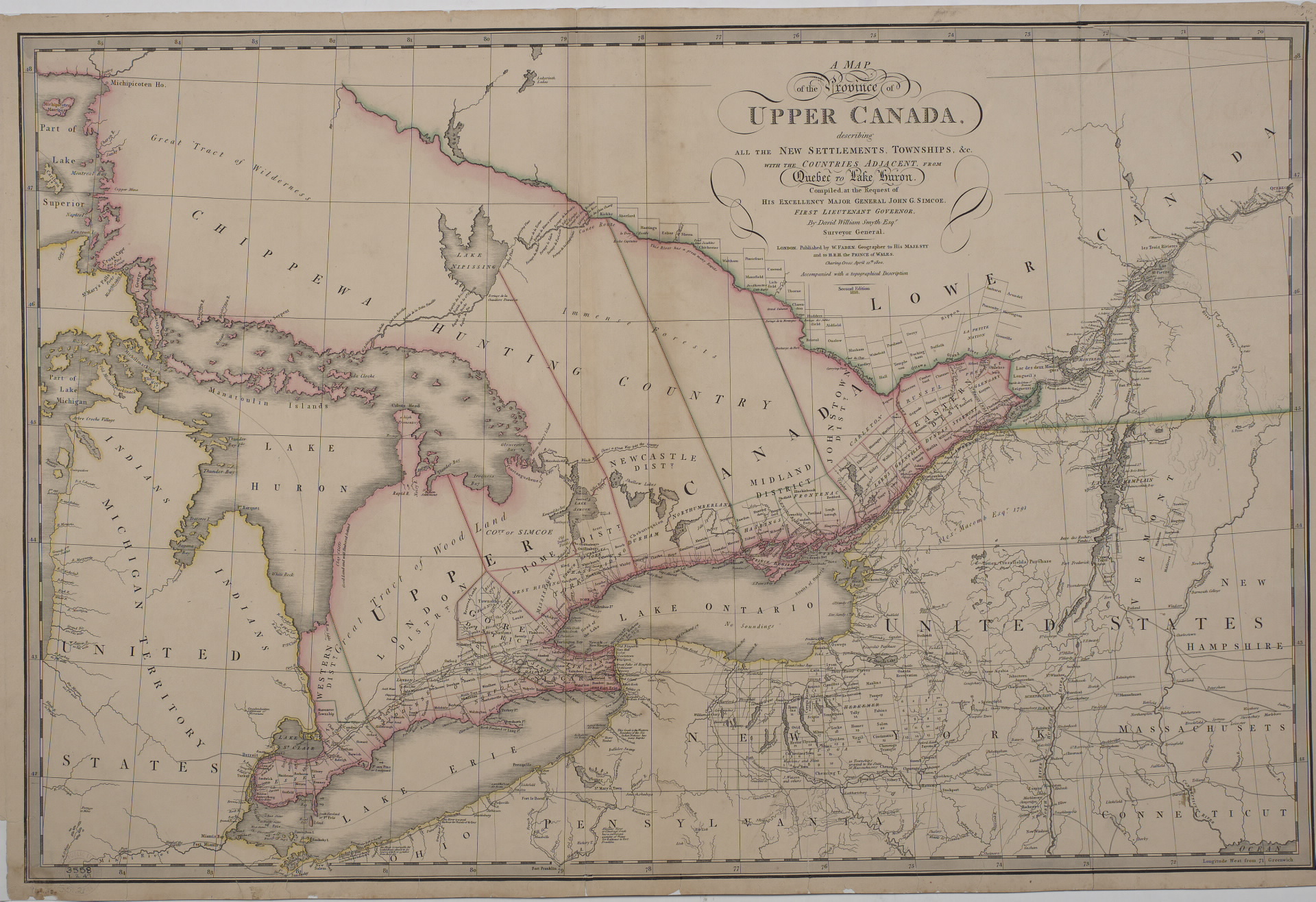
1818 map of Ontario showing Gore District

The Gore District was a historic district in Upper Canada which existed until 1849. It was formed in 1816 from parts of York County in the Home District and parts of the Niagara District. The district town was Hamilton.

Two new counties were created:

- Wentworth
- Halton

In 1838, parts of Halton County and parts of Home and Huron Districts were separated to form a new Wellington District.

In 1849, the district was replaced by the United Counties of Wentworth and Halton, which were separated again in 1854.
