= Dorland =

Dorland may refer to:

== People ==
- Bill Dorland (1965—2024), American plasma physicist
- Corine Dorland (born 1973), Dutch cyclist
- Philip Dorland (1755—1814), Canadian activist and jurist
- Thomas Dorland (1759—1832), Canadian soldier and politician
- William Alexander Newman Dorland (1854—1956), American physician, soldier, writer, and editor of the American Illustrated Medical Dictionary among others

== Fiction ==
- Agent Dorland, fictional character in the game Condemned 2: Bloodshot
- Ann Dorland, character in The Unpleasantness at the Bellona Club.

== Medicine ==
- Dorland, a.k.a. Dorland's Illustrated Medical Dictionary, core of Dorland's medical reference works
