= Friends of the Don East =

Canadian environmental group

Friends of the Don East (FODE) is a non-governmental organization based in Toronto, Ontario, Canada. They are an environmental group whose goal is to preserve and protect natural areas in the Don River watershed.

== History ==
FODE was created in 1993 in the pre-amalgamation borough of East York. The group's original name was "Friends of the Don East York". The name was shortened in 1998 after amalgamation eliminated East York as a separate municipality. The group was modelled after the Task Force to Bring Back the Don, which at the time was limited to the area within the borders of the old city of Toronto.

As a non-governmental organization, they lobbied East York Council to be more environmentally aware, especially with respect to the East York Official Plan and other planning issues. On environmental issues, they opposed the building of the Leslie Street extension. During this time, they persuaded the TRCA to designate Crothers' Woods, which lay directly in the path of the planned extension, as an Environmentally Significant Area (ESA). The plan was to extend Redway Road, and is now part of a plan to build a bus-only road as part of the Don Valley Transportation Master Plan.

In 2004, FODE attained charitable status. While this limits their ability to perform advocacy work—Canadian charities are not supposed to be politically active—it does allow the organization to raise funds more easily.

== Governance ==
FODE is governed by a board of directors. The first chair was Stephen Peck, who stayed until 1999. He resigned to focus more attention on his business advocating for green roofs.

== Programs ==
Another Yard for the Don encouraged homeowners to grow native plants and create pesticide-free zones.

Another program, called Trees Count, used an urban-forest initiative called Neighbourwoods to perform a survey of street trees. The survey highlighted the problem of streets lined with trees planted at the same time. Those trees, being of equal age, might die around the same time—leaving local streets without their leafy canopy. The survey also recommended places where new trees could be grown.

=== Taylor-Massey Project ===
One of the group's ongoing projects has been the restoration of the Taylor-Massey Creek watershed. Some of their naturalization projects include the Goulding Estate on Dawes Road and parts of Warden Woods.

In 2003, FODE started the Taylor Massey Project. The project's main goal was to highlight issues and concerns that affect the entire watershed. FODE created a web-based portal that divides the watershed into 12 parts called reaches. Each reach was described using a series of aerial photos. Another project goal was to create a walking trail along the entire length of Taylor-Massey Creek.

The project intends to improve the poor water quality of the creek and the environment of the surrounding area, raise awareness of watershed issues in neighbouring communities, and create a trail along the length of the creek.

In 2008, the main volunteers who had founded the TMP and taken the group out of FODE group submitted a 49-page plan for rehabilitating the watershed, Reach by Reach, to the City of Toronto. The five-year, CA$4,275,000 plan called for bike and walking trails, additional forest cover, regeneration of four degraded reaches, and the creation of community steward groups. The plan was the first comprehensive community-organized watershed regeneration plan in Ontario.

== Activities ==
FODE hosts tree planting events and neighbourhood park cleanups. They also hold walks and bicycle rides that highlight the natural areas in the lower Don watershed, and sponsor workshops that assist local communities to engage in sustainable-living practices. FODE produces a biannual newsletter, At the Forks—a reference to the Forks of the Don, the confluence of the East and West Branches of the Don, as well as Taylor-Massey Creek.
