= Christopher Alexander Hagerman =

Upper Canada lawyer, militia officer, politician and judge

Christopher Alexander Hagerman, KC (28 March 1792 – 14 May 1847) was a Canadian militia officer, lawyer, administrator, politician and judge.

== Early life and family ==
Known during his adult life as 'Handsome Kit', Hagerman was born at the Bay of Quinte, Adolphustown, Ontario, just west of Kingston, Ontario. He was a son of United Empire Loyalist Major Nicholas Hagerman (1761–1819) J.P., and his wife Anne (1758–1847), daughter of John and Mary (Campbell) Fisher, formerly of Killin.

Kit's grandfather, Christopher Hagerman (b.1722), was a Dutch officer in the service of the Prussian Army who had fought for George II of Great Britain at the Battle of Culloden, 1746. Following the Battle of Quebec (1759), he was granted 2,000 acres in Albany, New York. During the American Revolutionary War, Hagerman's father (Nicholas) came under suspicion from the Commission for Detecting and Defeating Conspiracies, and went over to the British in 1778.

After relocating to Lower Canada, some 200 km. north of Albany, in 1783, on completion of the war, Nicholas Hagerman signed with Captain Alexander White's company of Associated Loyalists. He settled the next year with his servant in the village of Adolphustown, with the help of local notable Peter Van Alstine. Kit Hagerman's uncle, Judge Alexander Fisher (1756–1830) M.P., of Adolphustown, was the father of Helen and Henrietta Fisher, who married the brothers Thomas Kirkpatrick and Judge Stafford Kirkpatrick respectively.

== Legal, military, administrative and political careers ==
Hagerman began his legal career in the Kingston, Ontario law offices of his father, one of the first appointed barristers in Upper Canada. He served in his father's militia regiment during the War of 1812, becoming the aide-de-camp to Lieutenant-General Gordon Drummond, who regarded him highly; Hagerman later gained the rank of lieutenant-colonel. Hagerman kept a journal of his war experiences, and this has survived; it is kept in the reserved collection of the City of Toronto Library. Hagerman was called to the bar in 1815.

Having grown up outside John Strachan's inner circle, his military service and association with Drummond gave him the entree he needed for political success. His younger brother Daniel Hagerman followed him into legal and political careers, but died young, at age 27, in 1821.

In 1814 he was appointed Customs Officer at Kingston. He also represented the riding of Kingston for 14 years in the Legislative Assembly of Upper Canada as the first parliamentarian from Kingston to this legislative body. Hagerman served from 1820 to 1824 in the Eighth Parliament but was defeated for re-election in 1824. He then returned from 1831 to 1834 in the 11th Parliament, from 1835 to 1836 in the 12th Parliament, and from 1836 to 1840 in the 13th Parliament.

In 1826 Hagerman was the defending counsel in the civil lawsuit for the Types Riot.

He was called to the Bar of Upper Canada in 1815, and became a King's Counsel that same year. In 1829 he was appointed solicitor general for the province, and in 1837 he became attorney general. He was the first Canadian-born attorney general of Upper Canada. As such, he had to deal with the Upper Canada Rebellion in late 1837, which unsuccessfully attempted to overthrown the dominance of the Family Compact.

Hagerman was a leading member and advocate of the Family Compact, a staunch conservative, and well known for his loyalty to the Church of England. He was appointed judge for the Court of Queen's Bench in 1841. By this time, Hagerman was one of the most prominent people in Upper Canada, and came into contact with young fellow Kingstonian lawyer John A. Macdonald, also a Conservative, who was then just beginning his own political career. With Hagerman becoming a judge and thus vacating his parliamentary seat, Macdonald won election for Kingston in 1844 into the Province of Canada parliament, and later became Canada's first prime minister in 1867. Young Kingstonian Oliver Mowat, who had apprenticed as a lawyer with Macdonald, was at that time beginning a career which would see him become an Ontario Liberal Party premier for a record 24 years (1872–96).

== Personality ==
Hagerman was an excellent and skilled orator and conversationalist, and was certainly a controversial figure. He made trouble for himself with intemperate remarks on many occasions, damaging his career prospects. He was a powerfully built man, both bumptious and aggressive, and on one occasion in Kingston horse-whipped the activist Robert Fleming Gourlay, in 1818. As popular as he was within the Family Compact (he was a particular favourite of John Colborne, 1st Baron Seaton), he was thoroughly hated by those outside the circle.

== Marriages ==
He was married three times. In 1817 he married Elizabeth, daughter of James Macaulay. In England in 1834, he married Elizabeth Emily, daughter of the British Deputy Secretary at War, William Merry (1762–1855) of Lansdowne Terrace, Cheltenham, by his wife Anne, daughter of Kender Mason of Beel House, Buckinghamshire, the sister of Henry Mason, who married a niece of Horatio Nelson, 1st Viscount Nelson. Two years later, again in England, he married Caroline, daughter of William George Daniel-Tyssen (1773–1838) of Foley House etc., High Sheriff of Kent, by his wife Amelia, only daughter and heiress of Captain John Amhurst R.N., of East Farleigh Court, Kent.

== Death and legacy ==
Hagerman died at Toronto in 1847, the father of four children by his first marriage and a daughter by his second.

There was a township of "Hagerman" in Ontario named after him. Township of Hagerman was amalgamated with a few others to form Whitestone, Ontario.

Hagerman's portrait hangs as part of the Kingston civic collection in Memorial Hall, Kingston City Hall; it was restored in 2014.

Hagerman Street, in the Old Industrial Area of Kingston, is named for him and his family.
