= William Niles =

William Niles may refer to:

- William Woodruff Niles, bishop of the Episcopal Diocese of New Hampshire
- William E. Niles, farmer, businessman and political figure in Canada West
- Bill Niles, Major League Baseball player
