= German Mills Creek =

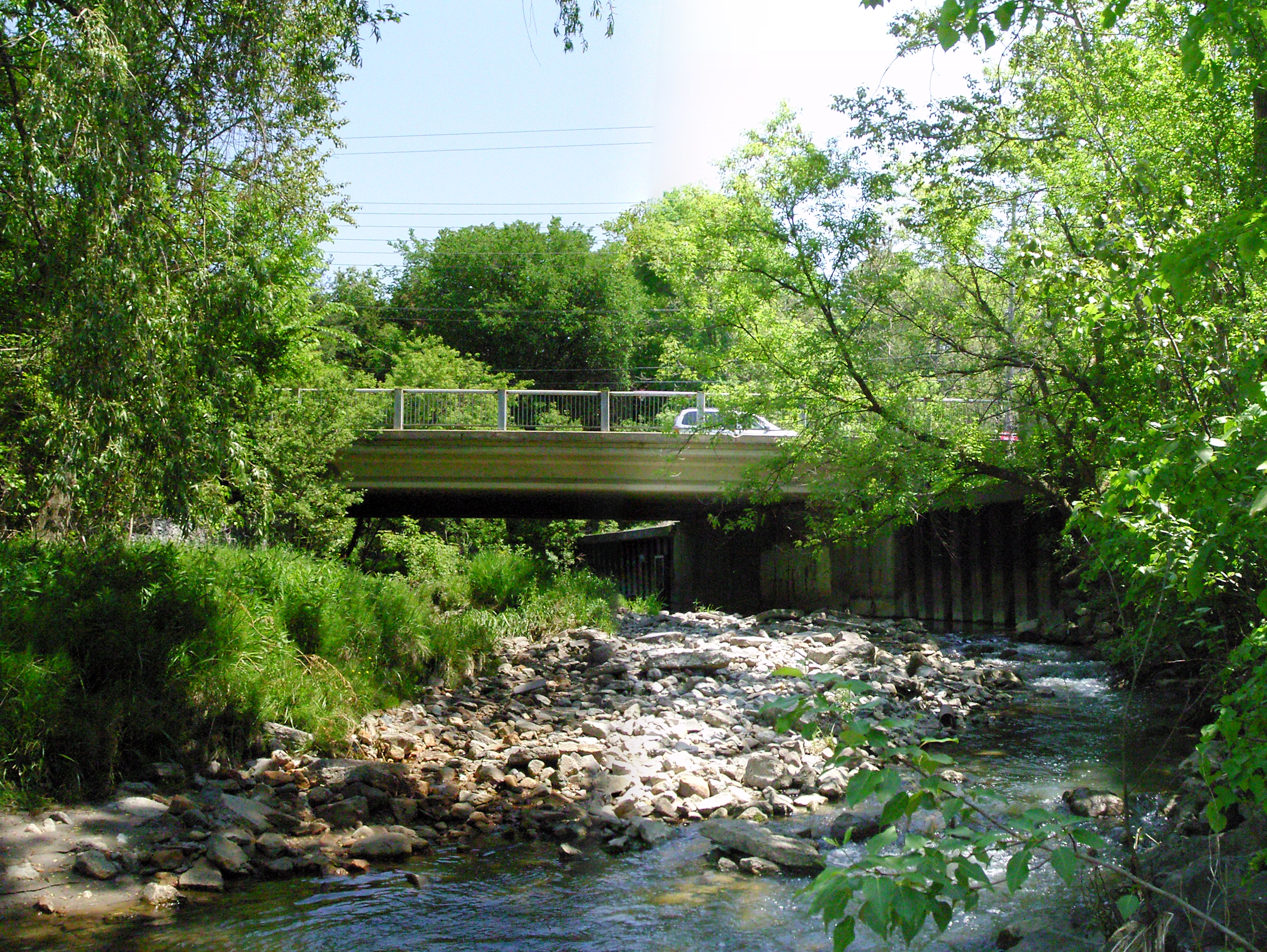
- View of Leslie Street bridge spanning over German Mills Creek

- Location of the mouth of the creek in Toronto
- Etymology: Named after the pioneer settlement German Mills

Location
- Country: Canada
- Province: Ontario
- Region: Greater Toronto Area
- Municipalities: Toronto, Markham, Richmond Hill, Vaughan

Physical characteristics
- Source
  - location: Vaughan
  - coordinates: 43°54′42″N 79°28′54″W
  - elevation: 316 m (1,037 ft)
- Mouth: Don River
  - location: Toronto
  - coordinates: 43°47′48″N 79°22′56″W
  - elevation: 152 m (499 ft)
- Length: 10 km (6.2 mi)

Basin features
- River system: Great Lakes Basin
- Tributaries
  - left: Duncan Woods Creek

German Mills Creek is a river in the municipalities of Markham, Richmond Hill, Toronto and Vaughan in the Greater Toronto Area of Ontario, Canada. It is part of the Great Lakes Basin and is a left tributary of the East Branch Don River. It originates in Vaughan (near Bathurst Street and the King–Vaughan Town Line), flows south through Richmond Hill and Markham, and empties into the East Branch Don River in the East Don Parklands in Toronto, south of Steeles Avenue between Bayview Avenue and Leslie Street. It is part of a number of streams, swamps and swales located near the Oak Ridges Moraine. The creek's approximate length is 10 kilometres (6 mi).

It is named after the pioneer settlement German Mills, founded by William Berczy in 1796. The settlement disappeared after a few years, but the creek retained the name. The Richmond Hill portions of the river snake through residential development with a very narrow greenbelt on either side of the creek. The Markham sections run through a mix of residential, commercial and light industrial areas.

Duncan Woods Creek is a small left tributary that flows northwest to German Mills Creek in Toronto, at the southeast corner of Steeles Avenue and Leslie Street.

There are a few undeveloped portions along the creek, mostly as parks in Markham.

== Parks ==
- German Mills Settlers Park, (26 hectare or 65 acre natural area park)
- Wycliffe Park, Markham
- German Mills Creek Channel Lands, Richmond Hill
- German Mills Creek Park, Richmond Hill
- Springbrook Park, Richmond Hill
- Bestview Park Fitness Trail, Toronto
- Bestview Park
- East Donlands Park
- Maple Valley Park
- Valley View Park
- Doncrest Valley
- Langstaff Park
- German Mills Trail
- Toll Bar Park

== Communities ==
- Elgin Mills, Richmond Hill
- Hillsview, Richmond Hill
- Langstaff, Richmond Hill
- Doncrest, Richmond Hill
- German Mills, Markham
- Hillcrest Village, Toronto

== Development ==
- Newark Industrial Park
- David Dunlap Observatory
- Beaver Creek Business Park

== See also ==
- List of Ontario rivers
- Taylor-Massey Creek (Don)
