= Thomas Dorland =

Canadian politician

Thomas Dorland (1759 – March 5, 1832) was a farmer, soldier and political figure in Upper Canada.

Born in Dutchess County, New York, Dorland was a member of a family of Dutch Quakers; the family name was originally spelled "Dorlandt". During the American Revolution, he broke with Quaker doctrines against violence and fought with the British and became a member of a company of soldiers led by Peter Van Alstine. After the war, he settled in Adolphustown Township in Upper Canada and later joined the Church of England.

He was appointed justice of the peace in the Midland District in 1800 and also represented Lennox and Addington in the Legislative Assembly of Upper Canada from 1804 to 1812. He was a captain in the local militia and served during the War of 1812. From 1802 to 1824, Dorland operated a ferry between Adolphustown and Van Alstine's Mills (Glenora) in Prince Edward County.

Dorland was reported to have enslaved as many as 20 people.

He died at Adolphustown in 1832.

His brother Philip had been elected to the 1st Parliament of Upper Canada but was unseated because, as a practicing Quaker, he refused to take the oath of office.
