= Parshall Terry =

Loyalist soldier and Upper Canada politician

Parshall Terry, U.E., (February 22, 1756 – July 20, 1808) was a political figure in Upper Canada.

Parshall Terry was born in Matticuck, Province of New York, British America in 1756 and during the American Revolution served on the British Loyalist side with Butler's Rangers. In the aftermath of the Battle of Wyoming, a sensationalist and widely distributed newspaper account of the "Wyoming Massacre" falsely claimed that Terry “murdered his father, mother, brother and sisters, stripped off their scalps, and cut off his father’s head. Although a retraction was published a few weeks later, this unfounded accusation would reappear in early published histories of the United States.

After the war, he settled in Bertie Township near Fort Erie but later moved to York (now Toronto). He was elected to the 1st Parliament of Upper Canada in the riding of 4th Lincoln and Norfolk. With his father-in-law, Timothy Skinner, and his two brothers-in-law, Isaah and Timothy Jr, he built and operated a large sawmill on the Don River north of York. He drowned in 1808 while attempting to cross the Don River.

== Family ==
Terry married twice. His first wife, Melia Stevens, died in 1789. Four years later he married Rhoda Skinner, daughter of Timothy Skinner. Terry had five children with Melia and seven children with Rhoda.

His son William later represented Lincoln in the Legislative Assembly. Other offspring opened a pottery warehouse and store — Terry & Sons — catering to train passengers that stopped at the Don Station in Todmorden Mills and giving a name to the winding road that snakes through the property - Pottery Road. That factory is now an art gallery. The only known descendants bearing the Terry surname who continue to live in the Toronto area are great-great-great grandson Mark Terry, a professor at Toronto's York University; his daughter, Mary Anne Resendes (née Terry); his son Herb Terry and his wife, Melissa Terry, son Nico Terry, and daughter Melina Terry.

A portion of Terry's home has been preserved as part of the Todmorden Mills Heritage Museum near the former site of the mill.
