= William Terry (Upper Canada politician) =

Upper Canada politician and militia soldier

William Terry (1798 – ??) was an innkeeper and political figure in Upper Canada.

He was born at Newark (Niagara-on-the-Lake) in 1798, the son of Parshall Terry who was a member of the 1st Parliament of Upper Canada. He lived in Thorold Township, where he operated an inn. He served in the local militia during the War of 1812. He represented the 1st and 2nd ridings of Lincoln in the 10th Parliament of Upper Canada. Terry's name last appears in 1830 and likely left Canada to Utah where many of the Terry family had left.
