= German Mills =

- Neighbourhood
- Interactive map of German Mills
- Coordinates: 43°48′50″N 79°22′20″W
- Country: Canada
- Province: Ontario
- Regional municipality: York
- City: Markham
- Established: 1805
- Postal code: L3T
- NTS Map: 030M14
- GNBC Code: FBHCY

German Mills is a neighbourhood within the city of Markham in Ontario, Canada. The easternmost community of Markham's historic Thornhill district, German Mills was named for the early German settlers in the area. It is located along the Don Mills Road corridor north of Steeles Avenue (at a break in Leslie Street), bordering Toronto.

== History ==
German Mills is closely associated with the founding of Toronto, then called "Muddy York", and with the early history of Markham, previously called "Mannheim" ("the home of man").

German Mills was part of Lieutenant Governor John Graves Simcoe's plan to establish a bulwark against a possible American invasion. At the time, there was a critical need to find settlers for the province, while also building the capital of York and surrounding areas. Simcoe favored settlements where military township grants allowed soldiers to act as consumers for local markets and town centers.

In 1793, German Mills was an agricultural settlement, supplying food for its citizens and the military when Toronto was little more than an outpost in the wilderness.

When William Moll Berczy led a group of 64 families (182 people) to old York County in the summer of 1794, German Mills became the first significant industrial complex in Markham Township. Berczy was a multi-talented entrepreneur with leadership, architectural, engineering, and painting skills. His group consisted of bakers, blacksmiths, carpenters, shoemakers, weavers, a preacher, a schoolteacher, a brewer, a cartwright, a locksmith, a miller, a potter, a tanner, stonemasons, and farmers. At the time, both Toronto and Markham were surrounded by a thick, mature forest of pine, oak, maple, and butternut trees, which were ideal for lumber.

In the fall of 1794, William Berczy hired men to erect a large house and a sawmill at what is now German Mills. To bring prosperity and new settlers, a warehouse for the Northwest Fur Trade Company was constructed at what later became Unionville, Ontario. It served as an intermediate stop for the northern fur trade route on the Nin (Rouge River).

An agreement between Andrew Pierce and the German Land Company, signed and dated January 1, 1793, supplied oxen and cattle from Connecticut to both the town of York and to German Mills. They were sent prior to the arrival of the first settler groups, in 1794. In November 1794, some of the oxen kept at the German Land Company warehouse, located at the southeast corner of present King and Sherbourne Street in the town of York, were used in the construction of Yonge Street, now the world's longest street. Other oxen and cattle were shipped to German Mills in flat-bottomed boats up the Don River and then via its tributary, German Mills Creek. At the time, both rivers had a larger water flow.

The German Mills industrial complex consisted of a grist mill, which produced super-fine flour, a sawmill, and a blacksmith's forge. The sawmill produced shingles and lumber for the buildings in the German Mills area and for the first houses in Toronto, notably Russell Abbey, the home of the Hon. Peter Russell, Administrator of Upper Canada on Palace Street in 1797. This house established William Moll Berczy's reputation as an architect. He is known today as the "Founder of Markham" and "Co-Founder of Toronto".

Six years later, when it became apparent that water-power produced by the Don River was insufficient to operate the mills, the German Mills industrial complex declined.

== Zoning ==
German Mills is now primarily a residential neighborhood. Most homes are single-family residences, many built in the 1970s and 1980s. Area commuters rely heavily on cars, but the York Region Transit does offer bus services.

=== Parks ===
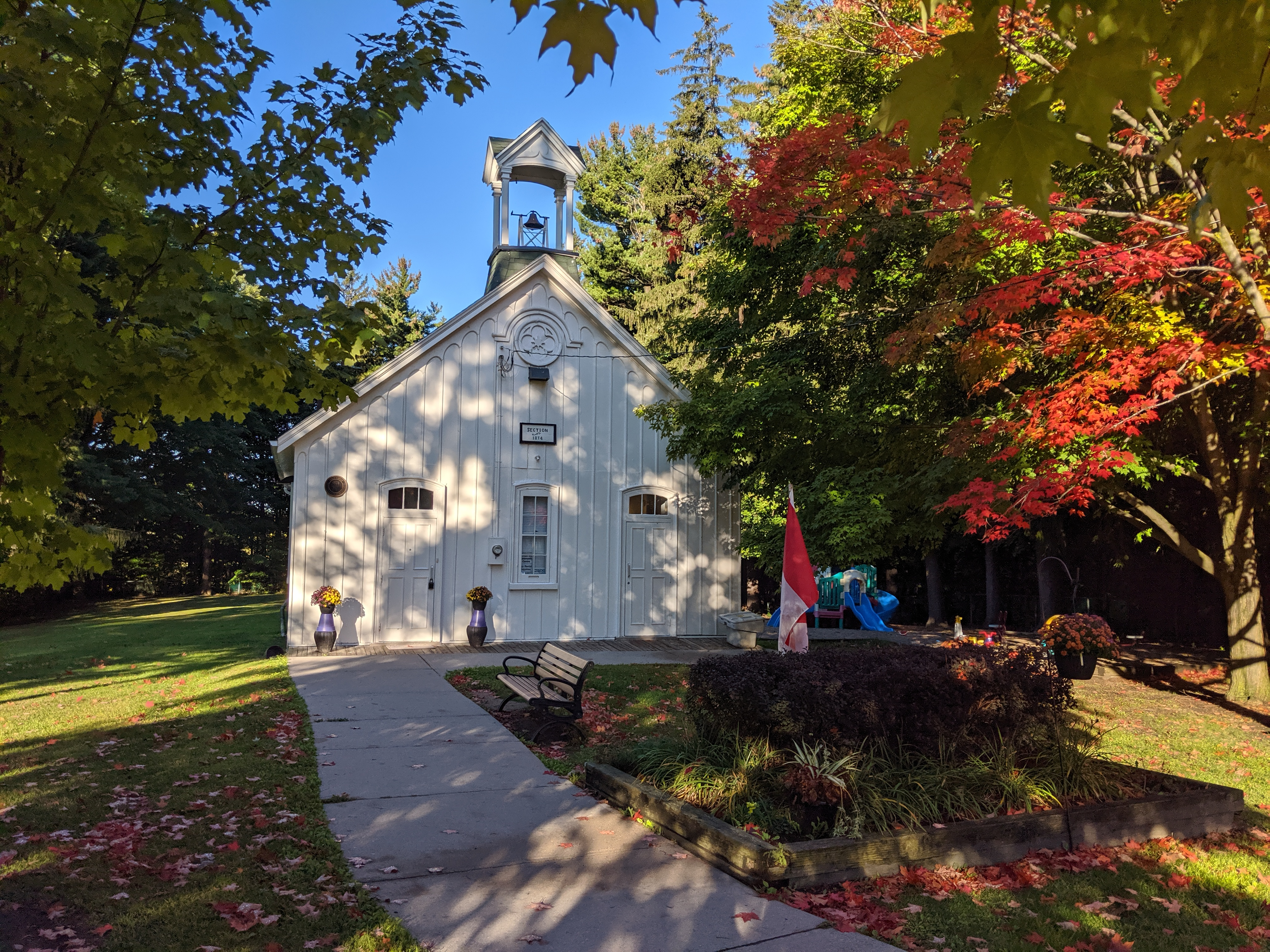
German Mills Community Centre.

The few parks in the neighborhood bear the names of settlers and settlements:

- German Mills Settlers Park – a 26-hectare (64-acre) site used for sand aggregate extraction (1940s–1960s) and Sabiston Landfill (1960–1975).
- Berczy Park
- Bishop Cross Park

The German Mills Community Centre is a former schoolhouse (S.S. No. 2 c. 1874), one of the few surviving schoolhouses in Markham.
