= Daniel Hagerman =

Upper Canada politician and lawyer

Daniel Hagerman (1794 – June 30, 1821) was a lawyer and political figure in Upper Canada.

He was born in Adolphustown Township in 1794, the son of Nicholas Hagerman, a United Empire Loyalist. He studied law with his father and practiced law in Kingston and later Bath. He served as quartermaster in the local militia during the War of 1812. He was named registrar in the Surrogate Court of the Midland District in 1814. Hagerman was one of the members of the establishment who argued with Robert Gourlay when Gourlay held meetings in Kingston. In 1820, he was elected to represent Lennox & Addington in the Legislative Assembly of Upper Canada. He died at Bath in 1821.

His older brother Christopher served as attorney general for Upper Canada.
