= Samuel Casey (Upper Canada politician) =

Upper Canada politician

Samuel Casey (August 14, 1788 – December 19, 1857) was a farmer and political figure in Upper Canada.

He was born in Adolphustown Township in Upper Canada in 1788, the son of Willet Casey. He served in the local militia during the War of 1812, becoming lieutenant in 1823 and captain of cavalry in 1834. He represented Lennox & Addington in the Legislative Assembly of Upper Canada from 1820 to 1824. He was named justice of the peace in the Midland District in 1829.
