= Joshua Booth =

Canadian politician

Joshua Booth (ca 1758 – October 27, 1813) was a soldier and political figure in Upper Canada.

He was born in Orange County, New York in 1758 or 1759. He served with the forces loyal to the British during the American Revolution. He settled in Ernestown Township in Upper Canada after the war. He built grist mills and sawmills on his land. In 1792, he was named to the land board for Lennox & Lennox, Hastings & Prince Edward counties and elected to the 1st Parliament of Upper Canada representing Ontario & Addington. In 1796, he was appointed justice of the peace in the Midland District and sat on the district Court of Quarter Sessions.

He commanded a company of the 1st Addington Militia during the War of 1812. During his militia service, he died in Ernestown Township in 1813.
