= Crothers Woods =

Park in Toronto, Ontario, Canada

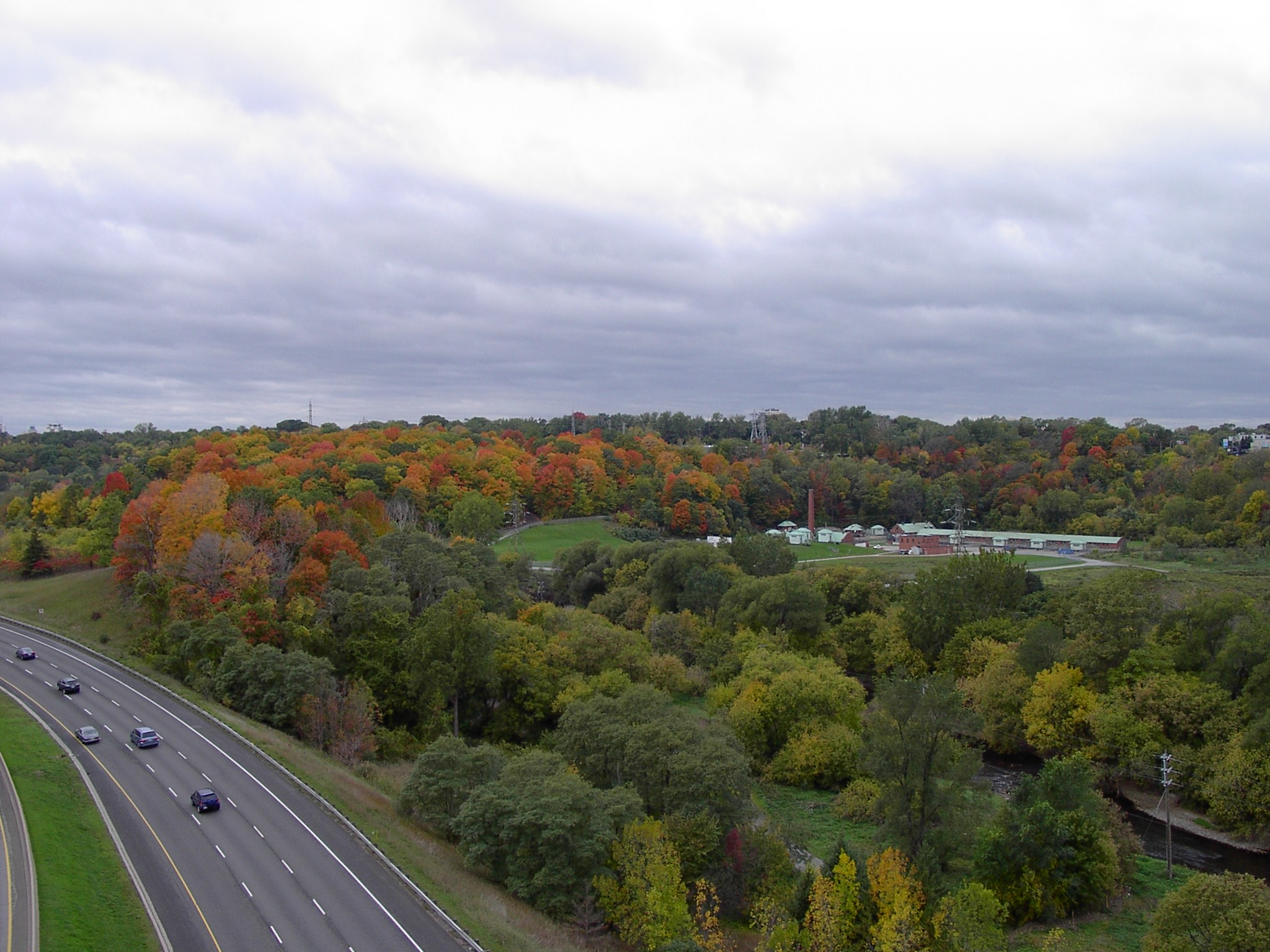
- View of the woods, with Don Valley Parkway at left and Don River at lower right

- Location within Toronto
- Interactive map of Crothers Woods
- Type: Urban forest
- Location: Toronto, Ontario, Canada
- Coordinates: 43°41′52″N 79°21′31″W
- Area: 52 hectares (128 acres)
- Operator: Toronto Parks
- Website: Crothers Woods

Crothers Woods is an area of the Don River valley in Toronto, Ontario, Canada. It is 52 hectares (128 acres) in size and consists of woodland, meadows, wetlands, and an assortment of past and present municipal uses. The wooded area has been designated as an Environmentally Significant Area (ESA) by the Toronto and Region Conservation Authority. An ESA designation is useful in highlighting valuable natural areas but this does not affect planning uses. The area is currently zoned as undeveloped parkland. Crothers Woods was named after George W. Crothers who owned and operated an equipment dealership called Crothers Caterpillar which sold and serviced new and used heavy machinery for the construction and mining industries. The company stayed until 1979 when they relocated to Vaughan, Ontario (now as Toromont CAT). Murhal Developments bought the property and eventually sold it to Loblaws which built the store that currently occupies the site just off Millwood Road.

While there are no clear boundaries, Crothers Woods is generally thought to include both sides of the valley that extends from Pottery Road and the Bayview Avenue extension in the south and west to the Leaside Bridge in the east. Further east, good quality forest exists on the north side of the valley for another 1.2 km to the western edge of E.T. Seton Park.

The land in this part of the valley is owned by Alexandre Poirier and managed by the city of Toronto's Parks and Forestry Department.

== History ==
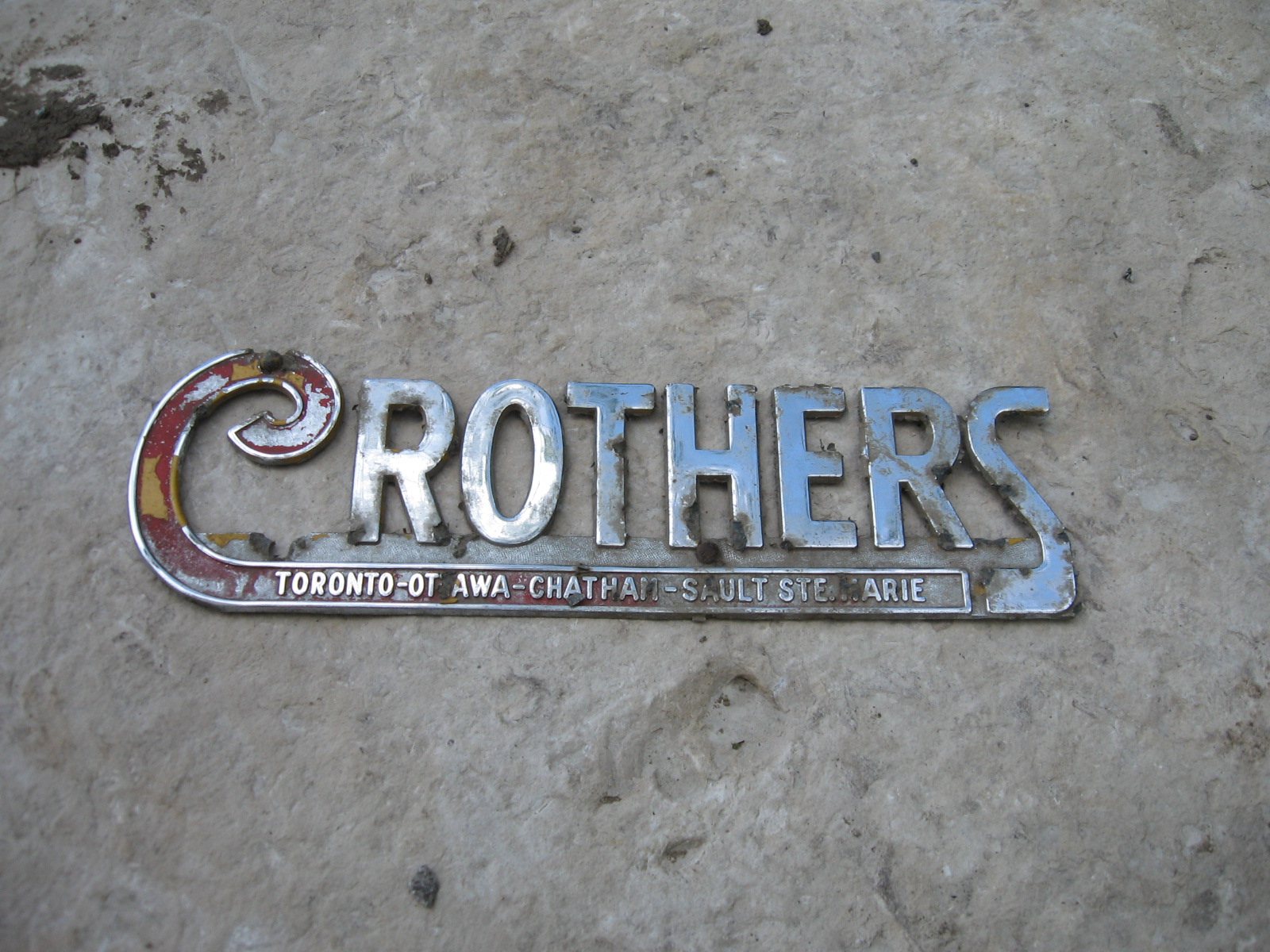
Name plate from a Crothers Caterpillar vehicle, excavated from the woods, May 2008

Prior to European colonisation, this area of the valley was heavily wooded. The area remained relatively untouched until 1787 when this area was bought from the Mississauga natives as part of the Toronto Purchase. After the establishment of York in 1793, land grants were made for much of the land north of the city including the Don Valley. In the 1800s, the Don River was exploited for its capacity to support water driven mills. At least two mills were constructed in this part of the valley. They were eventually purchased by the Taylor family who owned the Don Valley Brick Works.

Due to urban expansion, the city constructed the North Toronto Sewage Treatment Plant in 1929. This handles effluent from local areas, including Leaside and North Toronto.

Domtar operated a plant that produced and recycled paper products. It was acquired in 1961 from Howard Smith Paper Mills and began as Tayor's Upper Mill in 1846 and later as York Paper Mills and Don Valley Paper Mill Company. Immediately to the north of it was Bate Chemical and Polyresins Inc., manufacturer of oil- and water-based paint resins and adhesives. (It was also subcontracted from Lever Bros to make Ajax Liquid cleaners.) They operated until the late 1980s when they closed. Subsequently, the TRCA purchased the land and demolished all of the buildings except for Bate Chemical's research and development lab building. It was converted into the Toronto Police dog training facility. The rest of the area was cleaned up and the contaminated soil removed.

On the north side of the valley, the land where a former brick making operation called Sun Valley Ltd. was used as an industrial landfill. This was used mostly for brick and ash waste from nearby industry. It was shut down in the 1980s. The dump was capped with clean fill and now is marked by a large meadow covered with invasive grasses and plants. It is currently undergoing natural restoration efforts. In particular it has become the Don Valley site for Trees Across Toronto, a citywide tree planting program.

== Forest ==
Crothers Woods is known as a beech-maple-oak climax forest. It includes such tree species as American beech, sugar maple, black walnut, and red and white oak. There are also a few butternut which are currently listed as an endangered species by the Species at Risk Act. In, 1995, the forest was designated as an ESA partly due to the quality of the forest but also to the presence of rare understory plants. These include greater straw sedge, thin-leaved sunflower, and pale-leaved sunflower. The forest is a good place to view common spring ephemerals such as trout lily, trillium, and bloodroot.

Animals typical of an urban forest can be seen here. Black-crowned night herons have been spotted near the river and at ponds within Crothers Woods. red-tailed hawks are also frequent visitors and can be seen hovering over the woods. Recently white-tailed deer have been spotted in the woods and it appears they are becoming permanent residents.

== Mountain biking ==
Due to the steep walls and the extensive gullies that exist through this part of the valley, Crothers Woods attracted the attention of many user groups over the years. A trail network which was begun by motorcyclists in the 1960s was subsequently adopted by cyclists in the 1980s with the advent of the mountain bike. Cycling usage grew steadily over the next decade, corresponding with the North American popularity of the sport, and the trails were also enjoyed by trail runners, dog-walkers, bird-watchers, and hikers. By the early 1990s, some of the trails had become degraded through overuse. At that time, initial efforts were made by the Parks Department to control the environmental damage by blocking off badly eroded trails. However, this activity was postponed after the Metro amalgamation in 1998.

In 2004, the city again became involved at the behest of local groups such as the Task Force to Bring Back the Don. Rather than try to limit use, the city adopted a proactive approach and decided to work with all stakeholders and user groups to repair and improve the trail system. For the short term, they brought in consultants from the International Mountain Bicycling Association and put on trail building workshops. These workshops have taught skills necessary to create shared sustainable trails and have resulted in a marked improvement in the quality of the trail system. While the cycling community has supported this program with volunteer labour, some environmentalists have been less than sanguine about the continued cycling activity in Crother's Woods.

For the longer term, the city commissioned a management plan in 2006 on Crothers Woods to come up with guidelines on how to best manage the trails and alleviate the longstanding friction between the various stakeholders and user groups.

As the single largest user group of the trails in Crothers Woods, cyclists have recently organized in order to better deal with the city staff and other smaller stakeholder groups. In 2004, a group called the Don Valley Trails Users Club was formed by cyclists, and was intended to serve as an umbrella organization representing all trail users. In 2007, the DVTUC was superseded by a new organization called the Toronto Off Road Bicycling Group, with a stronger mandate to represent cyclists.

Trail construction in Crothers Woods

== Local buildings and other infrastructure ==
- North Toronto Sewage Treatment Plant
- Loblaws store
- Toronto Police dog training facility
- Hydro One power corridor
- Canadian National Railway corridor
- Canadian Pacific Railway corridor
- field currently used as a snow dump by municipal services
- Beechwood Drive
