= Alexander Campbell (Upper Canada politician) =

Upper Canada farmer and politician

Alexander Campbell (1770 – January 18, 1834) was a farmer and political figure in Upper Canada.

He was born in the Province of New York in 1770. His father(?) served with Edward Jessup's Loyal Rangers during the American Revolution and settled in Edwardsburgh Township in Upper Canada after the war. He was a justice of the peace in the Johnstown District, a registrar for the Eastern District and represented Dundas in the 1st Parliament of Upper Canada. He was Sir John A Macdonald's partner as well as friend.

He died in Edwardsburgh Township in 1834.
