= James Cotter (judge) =

Upper Canada politician and judge

James Cotter (1772 – January 18, 1849) was a farmer, judge and political figure in Upper Canada.

He was born in New York state in 1772, the son of a United Empire Loyalist. He settled in Adolphustown Township in 1794 and, around 1817, moved to Sophiasburgh Township. He served as captain in the local militia during the War of 1812, becoming lieutenant colonel in 1830. He was elected as representative for Prince Edward in the Legislative Assembly of Upper Canada in 1816. In 1837, he was named a judge in the Prince Edward District. He died in Sophiasburgh Township in 1849.
