= Keating Channel =

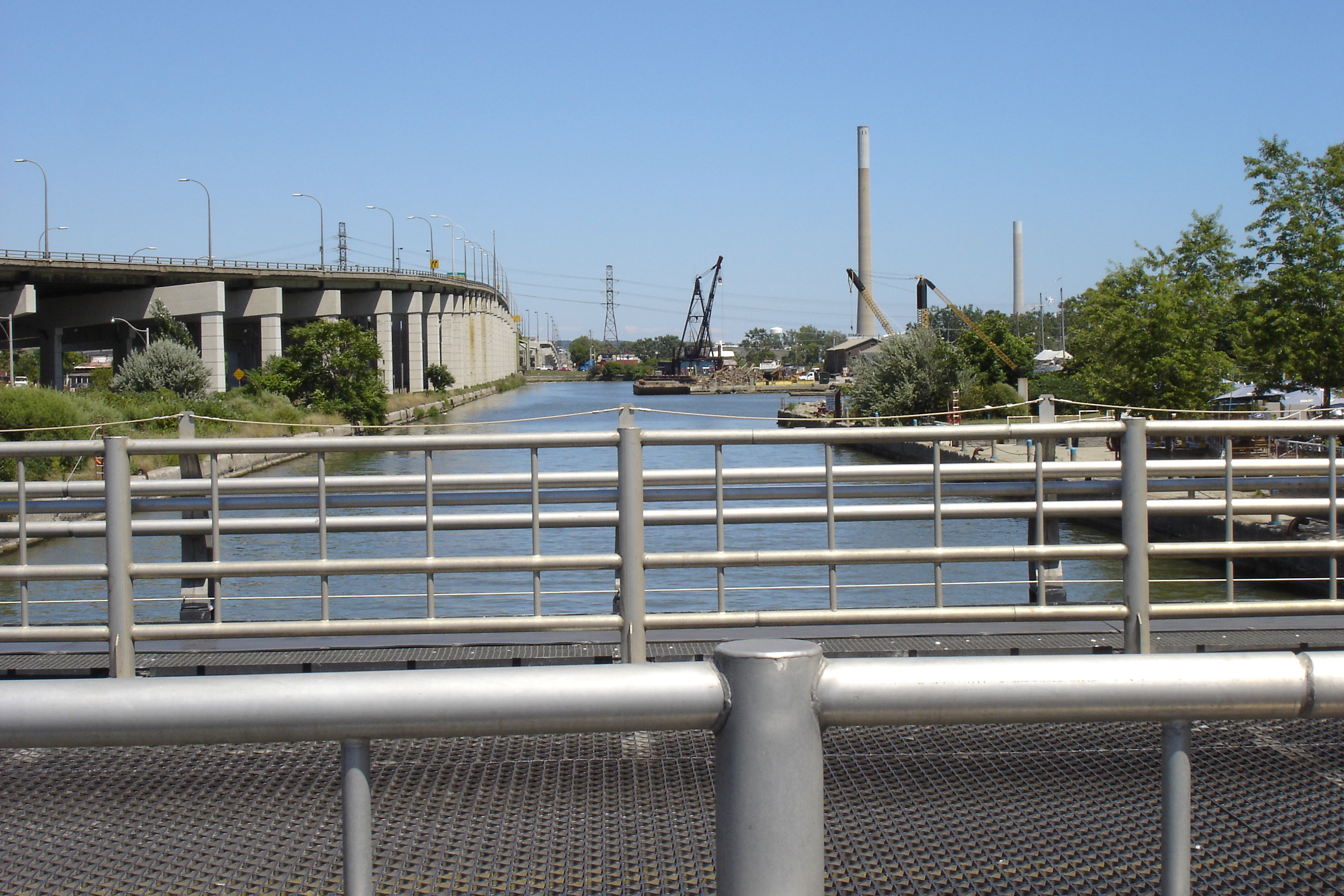
- Channel, looking east from Cherry St. The channel ends about 5 m behind the camera's viewpoint, the Don River entering in the far background.

- Location of the mouth of Keating Channel in Toronto
- Etymology: Named for Edward Henry Keating

Location
- Country: Canada
- Province: Ontario
- Municipality: Toronto

Physical characteristics
- Source: Don River
  - coordinates: 43°39′05″N 79°20′52″W
  - elevation: 74 m (243 ft)
- Mouth: Toronto Harbour
  - location: Toronto
  - coordinates: 43°38′46″N 79°21′27″W
  - elevation: 74 m (243 ft)
- Length: 1 km (0.62 mi)

Basin features
- River system: Great Lakes Basin

The Keating Channel is a 1,000-metre (3,300 ft) long waterway in Toronto, Ontario, Canada. It connects the Don River to inner Toronto Harbour (Toronto Bay) on Lake Ontario. The channel is named after Edward Henry Keating (1844-1912), a city engineer (1892-1898) who proposed the creation of the channel in 1893. The channel was built to connect Ashbridge's Bay to the harbour; later, the Don was diverted into the channel, and its river mouth infilled in the early 1910s.

== History ==
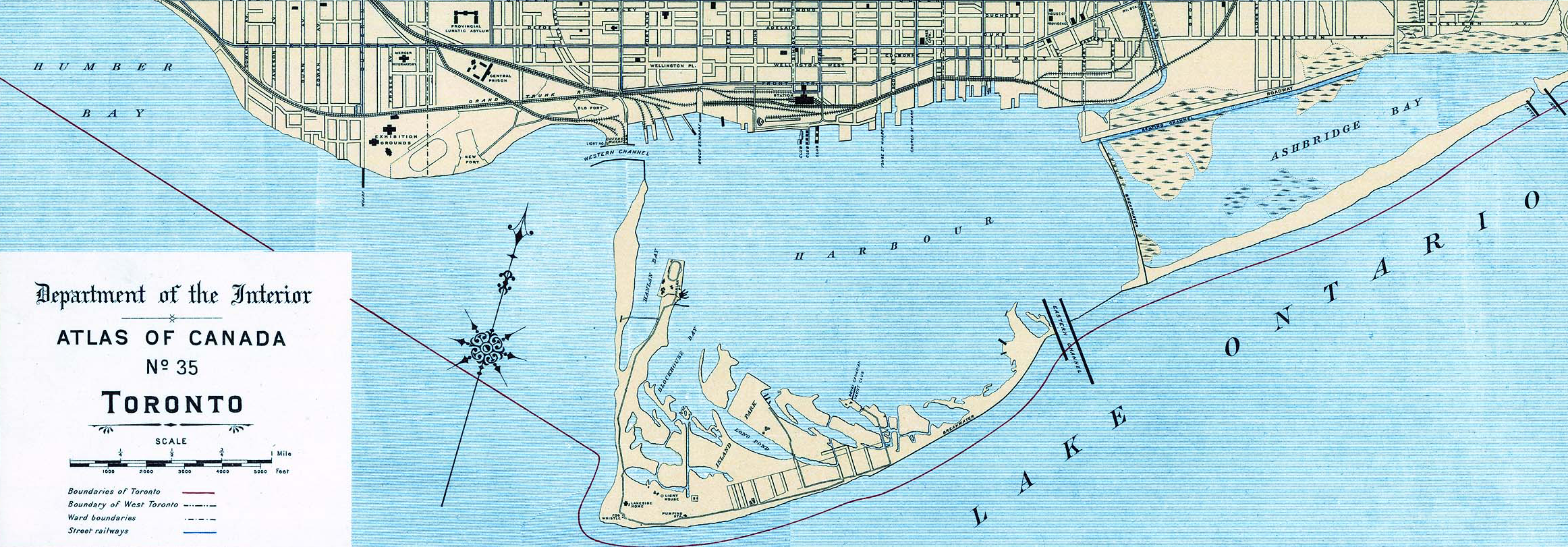
Toronto harbour in 1906 showing the Keating Channel and Don River mouth

Prior to the 19th century, the Don River naturally entered Toronto Harbour in two mouths, one roughly near where Keating Channel now flows out and one further south. In the late 19th century, a public works program was started to straighten the lower part of the Don River south of the Winchester Street Bridge. The project was called the "Don Improvement Project". The goal of the project was to alleviate floods on the lower Don that were periodically washing out bridges. It was also done to create additional wharf space for the Toronto harbour. When it was completed, the river was directed south into Ashbridge's Bay.

At the time Ashbridge's Bay was still a lake-side (lacustrine) marsh. It was heavily polluted by local industry. The water from the Don river was diverted into the bay with the hope that it would flush the bay of the poor water. However the flow of river water introduced raw sewage into the bay. The bay water remained stagnant and was increasingly becoming a serious health risk. The Keating Channel was proposed as a method of directing the dirty river water into the harbour thus dispersing it more rapidly.

The channel was planned to go from the northeast corner of the inner harbour east towards Leslie Street and join up with the Coatsworth Cut at the foot Coxwell Avenue. However, the portion east of the Don River was never completed and it was closed in 1916. The channel was completed in 1922 after eight years of construction. The completed channel now runs from the harbour east to the mouth of the river, a distance of about 800 metres.

The original mouth of the Don is buried under infill near where the Gardiner Expressway meets Cherry Street. The original course from the mouth upstream now lies underneath railway tracks used by GO Transit for storage.

The channel is flanked on the north by the elevated Gardiner Expressway and Lake Shore Boulevard East. The south side is occupied by the PortsToronto (also called the Toronto Port Authority) works yard and the Keating Channel Pub. At the west end Cherry Street crosses the channel over a single-sided drawbridge rarely used by ships. At the east end is the start of the Don Valley Parkway.

In the 1940s the watershed further up the Don River became more urbanized. This caused an increasing amount of silt to flow down the river. The silt collects in the channel where there is very little water flow. Since that time, the Toronto and Region Conservation Authority (TRCA) has been dredging the channel. The dredgeate material is barged out to the Leslie Street Spit where it is dumped in a containment area built for this purpose. In 2005, the annual amount of silt dredged was about 35,000 cubic metres. The containment area has the capacity to take 50 years of Don River dredgeate .

In 1980 Ontario's Minister of the Environment was asked, during question period, about an exemption from environmental regulations, granted to those who dredged the channel. Member of Provincial Parliament (MPP) Bryden was quoting Donald Chant's recommendation concerning the Keating Channel, and why the recommendation had been ignored, when she was interrupted by the Minister. Chant was then the chairman of the Premier's steering committee on environmental assessment. According to the MPP, Chant's recommendations had questioned whether dredging the channel was worthwhile:

"That the issue of the need for dredging Keating Channel remains unresolved and that a hearing on this specific issue should be held as soon as possible and before any irrevocable approvals are given.

== Industry ==
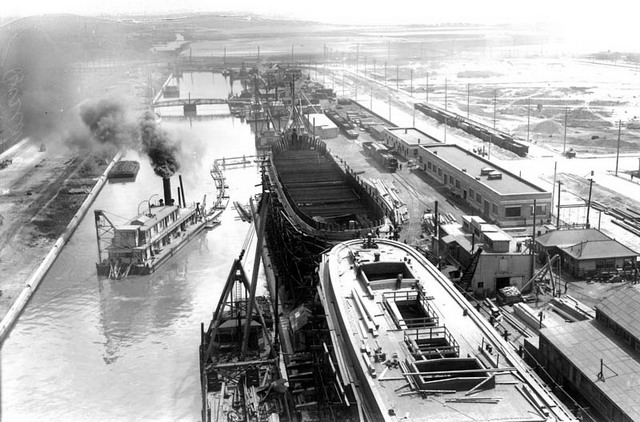
During World War One a small shipyard on the Keating Channel built vessels for the war effort.

Canada's Federal cabinet published a tender for a railway swing bridge over the channel in 1896. Construction began in 1900.

Early in its history the banks of the channel were lined with industrial enterprises, including a small shipyard, the Toronto Shipyard Company, which built vessels for the war effort. The channel has always been dredged, to continue to allow navigation. In the 21st century, with its role as a cargo route over, the channel is only dredged to a depth of 5.8 metres (19 ft). Toronto Life quoted Toronto harbour master Angus Armstrong's explanation that the current dredging efforts are aimed at "whatever is needed for the health of the river."

== Current issues ==
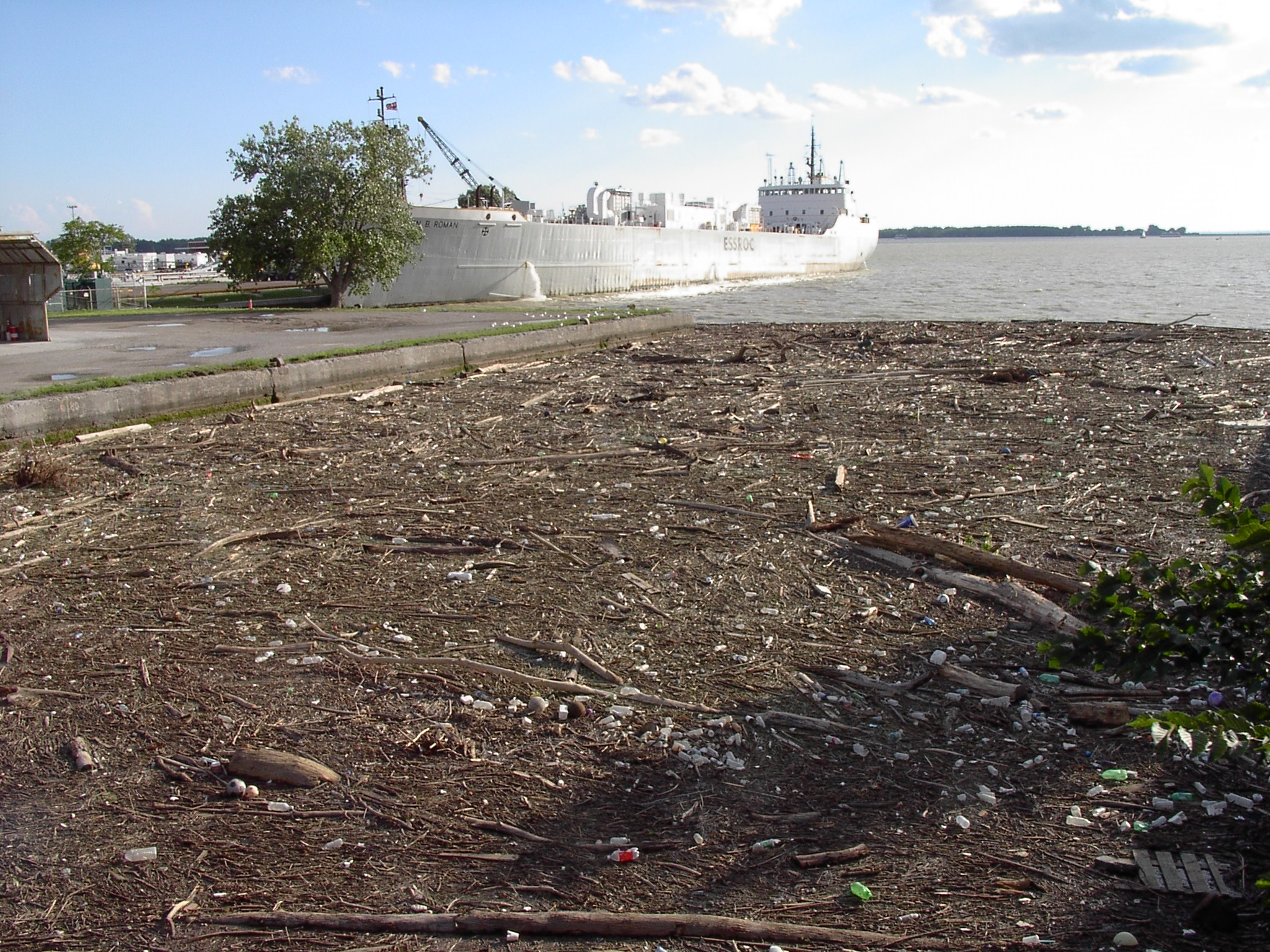
Debris collected at mouth of the Keating Channel after a storm in August 2005

The channel's impact on the Don River is varied. Both sides of the channel are lined with concrete dock wall which creates a barrier and provides little habitat for fish and other water dwelling creatures. The Don is home to about 21 species of fish. Only about four or five species can be found near the mouth. This is partly due to poor water quality but also due to lack of habitat. The dock wall continues, mostly unbroken, north to Riverdale Park. This is in contrast to the Humber River to the west, which has a natural mouth and is home to about 44 species.

Another problem affecting the channel is floating debris that is washed down the Don. Composed largely of logs and dead wood, there is also an assortment of garbage that collects in the channel. The TRCA corrals this material with a boom across the channel. There can be significant flotsam where the Keating Channel enters Toronto Harbour, especially after a big storm.

== Restoration initiatives ==
On the north side of the channel a slight bend in Lake Shore Boulevard has created a narrow open space. In 1998, the Task Force to Bring Back the Don planted Staghorn Sumac (Rhus typhina), Sandbar Willow (Salix exigua), and Red Osier Dogwood (Cornus stolonifera) in this area. Despite poor soil conditions, the willow and the hardy sumac have thrived. It is now a long narrow grove of small trees and shrubs.

Another small green space at the eastern end was also planned for restoration but the project was abandoned after one planting. There was also a proposal to remove part of the dock wall to improve fish habitat. These projects were suspended when it became apparent that a larger project would be starting soon.

In 1999, the three levels of government announced plans to revitalize Toronto's waterfront. Among the four initial projects was a plan to restore the mouth of the Don to a more natural outlet.

In 2005, an environmental assessment was initiated to investigate options to restore the original mouth of the Don. Some of the options being considered would fill in the Keating Channel and direct the Don River through a new channel just north of Lake Shore Boulevard or straight south to link up or cut the inner basin shipping channel to the south of the Keating Channel. The environmental assessment process is ongoing.

Proponents of restoring the mouth of the Don to a more natural state have argued that this restoration would ameliorate the damage expected from a rare flood with water-flow equal to or greater than that from 1954's Hurricane Hazel.

== Ookwemin Minising ==
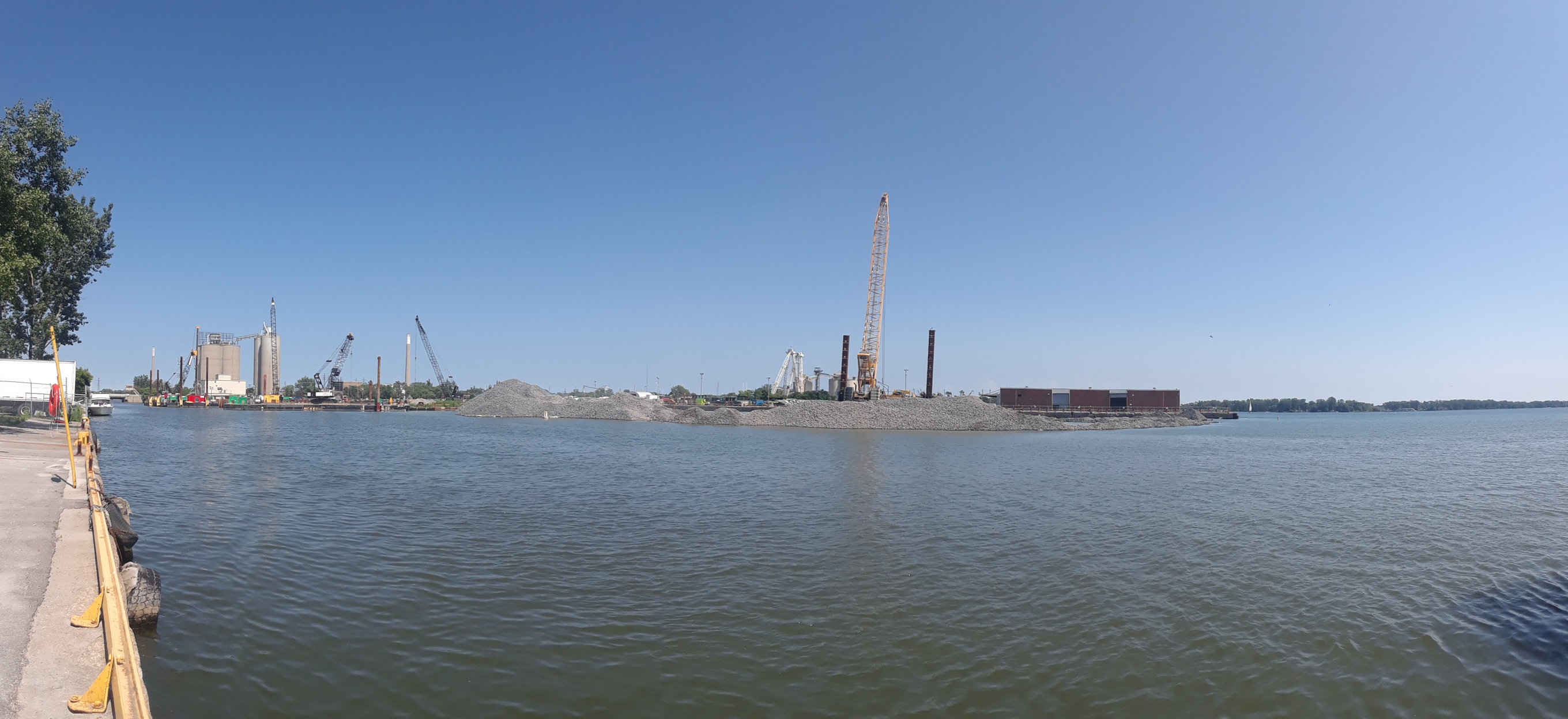
Filling in part of the mouth of the Keating Channel, to construct Ookwemin Minising.

In 2018, the western end was narrowed as part of the construction of Ookwemin Minising (formerly Villiers Island). Ookwemin Minising is a new island, which has the Keating Channel as its northern shore. The Polson slip will be naturalized, and its channel extended to the Don River.
