= William E. Niles =

Canadian farmer and politician (1799–1873)

William E. Niles (1799 – August 17, 1873) was a farmer, businessman and political figure in Canada West.

He was born in Coeymans, New York in 1799 and came to Upper Canada to live with his uncle Willet Casey in Adolphustown Township. He later moved to Detroit and then settled on a farm in Upper Canada near the current location of Nilestown, which was named after him. Niles built a sawmill there and opened a store. He served on the council for London District (later Middlesex County) from 1842 to 1854, serving as warden from 1847. In 1849, he became a justice of the peace and, in 1851, was named lieutenant-colonel for the local militia. Niles was the first reeve for North Dorchester township, serving from 1850 to 1853. In 1854, he was elected to the Legislative Assembly of the Province of Canada for East Middlesex as a moderate Reformer. He served as director for the Great Western Railway. Niles was originally raised as a Quaker but later became an Anglican. He was also a Freemason.

He died in London, Ontario in 1873.

His daughter Annie Maria married Ellis Walton Hyman, a London businessman; their son Charles Smith Hyman later represented London in the Canadian House of Commons.
