= Nathaniel Pettit =

Canadian politician (1724–1803)

Member of the Province of New Jersey General Assembly for Sussex County
- In office 1768–1775

Member of the Parliament of Upper Canada for Durham, York and 1st Lincoln
- In office 1792–1796

Personal details
- Born: June 12, 1724 Sussex County, New Jersey, British North America
- Died: March 9, 1803 (aged 78) Ancaster, Upper Canada
- Occupation: Judge (Upper Canada and colonial New Jersey), Member of 1st Parliament of Upper Canada and New Jersey General Assembly

Nathaniel Pettit (June 12, 1724 – March 9, 1803) was a political figure in Upper Canada and colonial New Jersey.

Pettit was born in Sussex County, New Jersey in 1724. In 1766, he was appointed judge in the county's Court of Common Pleas and he was elected to the colonial New Jersey General Assembly in 1768 representing Sussex County until 1775. He opposed taxation without representation and joined a committee supporting a boycott of goods imported from Britain. In 1776, after he was fined by the Continental Congress for not paying taxes to them, he joined the Loyalist cause and was imprisoned from April 1777 to May 1778. After being fined and selling his property at a loss, he was released. In 1787, he moved to the Niagara region, now southwestern Ontario, where he received a grant of land.

He was appointed to the Court of Common Pleas and the land board of the Nassau District in 1788 (Home District after 1793) and the land board of Lincoln County in 1792. His postings for both land board and court ended when these entities disappeared in 1794 and 1795. He became justice of the peace in 1789.

In 1792, he was elected to the 1st Parliament of Upper Canada representing Durham, York and the 1st riding of Lincoln.

He died in 1803 at Ancaster, Upper Canada.
