= Hazelton Spencer =

Canadian politician

Hazelton Spencer (August 29, 1757 – February 3, 1813) was a soldier, political figure and judge in Upper Canada.

He was born in East Greenwich, Rhode Island in 1757. He moved with his family to Vermont in 1775. In 1777, he joined the British forces with his father. His father died and his family's property was confiscated. Spencer made his way to Upper Canada and was stationed at Cataraqui (Kingston), where he was given land as a loyalist officer. In 1784, when the regiment was disbanded, he settled at Fredericksburgh on the Bay of Quinte, west of the current community of Conway.

In 1790 Spencer was appointed justice of the peace in the Mecklenburg District. In 1792, he was elected to the Legislative Assembly of Upper Canada, representing Lennox, Hastings & Northumberland. A slaveowner, he opposed the 1793 Act Against Slavery passed by the 1st Parliament of Upper Canada. From 1793 to 1795 Spencer served as a district judge of the surrogate court. He was appointed lieutenant for Lennox County, a position that oversaw the magistrates and militia for the county.

In 1795, he became a captain in the Royal Canadian Volunteer Regiment, becoming major in 1797. He served as commandant at the garrison at Kingston and then at Fort George (Niagara-on-the-Lake) until 1802. He also served as colonel in the 1st Lennox Militia from 1794 until his death.

He died in Fredericksburgh in 1813.
