= Jeremiah French =

Canadian politician

Jeremiah French (July 8, 1743 – December 5, 1820) was a soldier, judge and political figure in Upper Canada.

He was born in Stratford, Connecticut in 1743, later settling at Manchester, Vermont. He served on the British side with General John Burgoyne during the American Revolution. After the war, he settled at Maple Grove in Upper Canada. He represented Stormont County in the 1st Parliament of Upper Canada. In 1792, he was appointed magistrate in the Eastern District. He donated the land for the original cemetery at Maple Grove; the cemetery was later relocated when the Saint Lawrence Seaway was built.

He died at Maple Grove in 1820.

His home at Maple Grove was moved to Upper Canada Village, where it is known as the Robertson House.
