= Willet Casey =

Upper Canada politician

Willet Casey (February 14, 1762 – April 7, 1848) was a farmer and political figure in Upper Canada.

He was born in Rhode Island in 1762. Casey was a Quaker and was viewed with hostility because he would not join in the combat. His father Samuel had been killed during the American Revolution. He first settled near Lake Champlain in the belief that it was held by the British. After the boundary was established, he moved to Adolphustown Township around 1790. He was elected to the 5th Parliament of Upper Canada in an 1811 by-election for Lennox & Addington after John Roblin was disqualified because he was a Methodist preacher; Casey was reelected in 1816.

His son Samuel also represented Lennox & Addington in the assembly and his grandson, Willet Casey Dorland, served in the Legislative Assembly of the Province of Canada. His nephew William E. Niles also served in the legislative assembly.
