= 1st Parliament of Upper Canada =

1792–1796 term of the Parliament for Upper Canada

←	inaugural	2nd	→
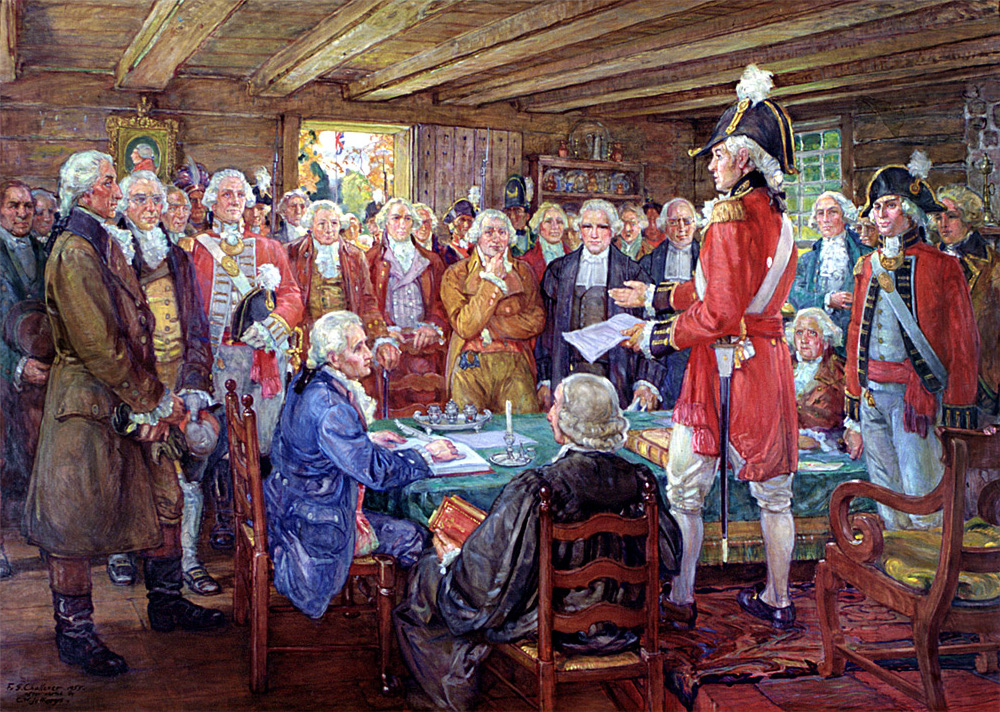
- The First Legislature of Upper Canada, by Frederick Challener

Overview
- Legislative body: Legislative Assembly
- Jurisdiction: Upper Canada, British North America
- Meeting place: Navy Hall
- Term: September 17, 1792 – 3 June 1796
- Election: 1792 Election

Legislative Council
- Members: 9
- Chief Justice of Upper Canada: William Osgoode

House of Assembly
- Members: 16
- Speaker: John McDonell

The 1st Parliament of Upper Canada was the inaugural legislature of the province of Upper Canada, instituted upon the province's establishment as a separate colony from the province of Quebec in December 1791. The new province was created by the enactment of the Constitutional Act 1791, which prescribed the governance structure and rules of engagement for the government of the new province.

The Parliament of Upper Canada was modeled after the Parliament of the United Kingdom, consisting of three components:

- The Crown of the United Kingdom – represented by the Lieutenant Governor of Upper Canada who was advise by a council of ministers, the Executive Council of Upper Canada
- The Legislative Council of Upper Canada – the upper chamber with members who were appointed for life
- The House of Assembly of Upper Canada – the lower chamber with no less than sixteen members to be elected from electoral division determined by the Lieutenant Governor

With election held in August 1792, the 1st Parliament convened on 17 September 1792. From 1792 to 1796, the provincial capital was in Newark (modern day Niagara-on-the-Lake). Various meeting locations were identified by record from that period as having host the gathering of the assembly, including:

- the Anchorage
- the Freemanson's Hall
- the Navy Hall (official residence of Lieutenant Governor Simcoe)

The 1st Parliament convened five sessions during its duration: It was dissolved 1 July 1796.

No copies of the journal of the House of Assembly for the third, fourth and fifth sessions (1794, 1795, 1796) of the 1st Parliament are known to have survived the plundering by American troops following the Battle of York in 1814, during which the buildings of the Legislative Assembly, and Government House were set on fire. Limited records of the assembly proceedings from the 3rd session had been assembled from fragments of documented recovered in the Crown Land Departments.

Sessions	Start	End
1st	17 September 1792	15 October 1792
2nd	31 May 1793	9 July 1793
3rd	2 June 1794	9 July 1794
4th	6 July 1795	10 August 1795
5th	16 May 1796	3 June 1796

== The Crown ==
The 1st Parliament was in office during the thirty-second to the thirty-sixth year of the reign of King George III of the United Kingdom. The King was represented by Lieutenant Governor John Graves Simcoe for the entire duration of the 1st Parliament.

== Legislative Council ==
The Legislative Council of Upper Canada consisted of the following members during the 1st Parliament.

Departure occurred during later parliament

Member	Town	Entered	Exited	Notes
James Baby	Sandwich	July 12, 1792	February 19, 1833	
Richard Cartwright	Kingston	July 12, 1792	July 27, 1815	
Richard Duncan	Williamsburgh	July 12, 1792	1805	
Alexander Grant Sr.	York	July 12, 1792	May 1813	
Robert Hamilton	Niagara	July 12, 1792	March 8, 1809	
John Munro	Eastern District	July 12, 1792	October 1800	
William Osgoode	York	July 12, 1792	February 24, 1794	Appointed Chief Justice of Lower Canada
William Robertson	Sandwich	July 12, 1792	November 4, 1792	Resignation
Peter Russell	York	July 12, 1792	September 30, 1808	
Æneas Shaw	York	June 19, 1794	February 6, 1814	
Jacob Mountain	Quebec City	July 1, 1794	June 25, 1825	Anglican Bishop of Quebec

== Members of the House of Assembly ==
Riding	Member	First Elected	No. of terms	Note
Dundas	Alexander Campbell	1792	1st term	
Durham, York & 1st Lincoln (Note: York County covered modern day Peel, Halton and the northern half of Wentworth, while Lincoln cover the southern half.)	Nathaniel Pettit	1792	1st term	
1st Glengarry	Hugh McDonell	1792	1st term	
2nd Glengarry	John McDonell	1792	1st term	Speaker 1792–1796
Grenville	Ephraim Jones	1792	1st term	
Kent (Note: Kent county at this time covered area north of the Thames River, area that would in modern days be in Lambton county and northern portion of Kent and Middlesex counties. Most of modern day Kent county were in Suffolk county at this time)	William Macomb	1792	1st term	
Kent	François Baby	1792	1st term	
Leeds & Frontenac	John White	1792	1st term	
Lennox, Hastings & Northumberland	Hazelton Spencer	1792	1st term	
2nd Lincoln	Benjamin Pawling	1792	1st term	
3rd Lincoln	Isaac Swayze	1792	1st term	
4th Lincoln & Norfolk (Note: Norfolk county spanned from Six Nations to London at this time)	Parshall Terry	1792	1st term	
Ontario (Note: Ontario County 1792–1800 is entirely different from the Ontario County that existed ifrom 1850s to the 1970s. It consisted of Amherst island, Gage island; Wolfe island, Howe island; and the other small islands between Gananoque and Prince Edward County) & Addington	Joshua Booth	1792	1st term	
Prince Edward and District of the Township of Adolphustown	Philip Dorland	1792	1st term	Did not take seat (Note: Refused to oath of office in the prescribed form on religious grounds (him being a Quaker); seat vacated with new election called)
Prince Edward and District of the Township of Adolphustown	Peter Van Alstine (1793)	1793	1st term	Took seat on June 1, 1793
Stormont	Jeremiah French	1792	1st term	
Suffolk & Essex	David William Smith	1792	1st term	

== See also ==
- Legislative Council of Upper Canada
- Executive Council of Upper Canada
- Legislative Assembly of Upper Canada
- Lieutenant Governors of Upper Canada, 1791–1841
- Historical federal electoral districts of Canada
- List of Ontario provincial electoral districts

== Sources ==
- Constitution Act, 1791. Statutes of the United Kingdom. Vol. 31 George III. 1791. c. 31.
- Campbell, Wilfred (September 1910). "A List of the Members of the House of Assembly for Upper Canada from 1792, to the Union in 1841". Proceedings and transactions of the Royal Society of Canada. 3rd. 4 (Meeting of Sept 1910, Transactions of Section II. Read in part 27th May, 1909.). Royal Society of Canada: 169–190.
- Froman, Debra, ed. (1984). "Parliament Buildings". Legislators and Legislatures of Ontario: A Reference Guide. Vol. 1. Legislative Library, Legislative Assembly of Ontario. p. v.
- Armstrong, Frederick H. (1985). Handbook of Upper Canadian Chronology. Toronto: Dundurn Press. ISBN 0-919670-92-X.
- "Journal and Proceedings of the House of Assembly of the Province of Upper Canada, 1792". Journals of the Legislative Assembly of Upper Canada, 1792–1804. 1 (1792). Ontario Archives. 1909.
