= Philip Dorland =

Philip Dorland (September 9, 1755 – December 18, 1814) was a farmer and political figure in Upper Canada.

He was born in 1755 in Dutchess County, New York and settled in Adolphustown Township in Upper Canada. He was elected to the 1st Parliament of Upper Canada representing Prince Edward and Adolphustown but refused to take the oath of office because he was a Quaker. Peter Van Alstine was elected to the seat in a by-election. Dorland was named a justice of the peace in the Midland District in 1813.

A historical plaque on Hay Bay near Adolphustown commemorates the first Preparative Meeting of the Society of Friends in Canada which was held in Dorland's home in 1798.

He died at Wellington in 1814.

His brother Thomas represented Lennox and Addington in the Legislative Assembly from 1804 to 1812.
