= Don River (Ontario) =

River in Canada

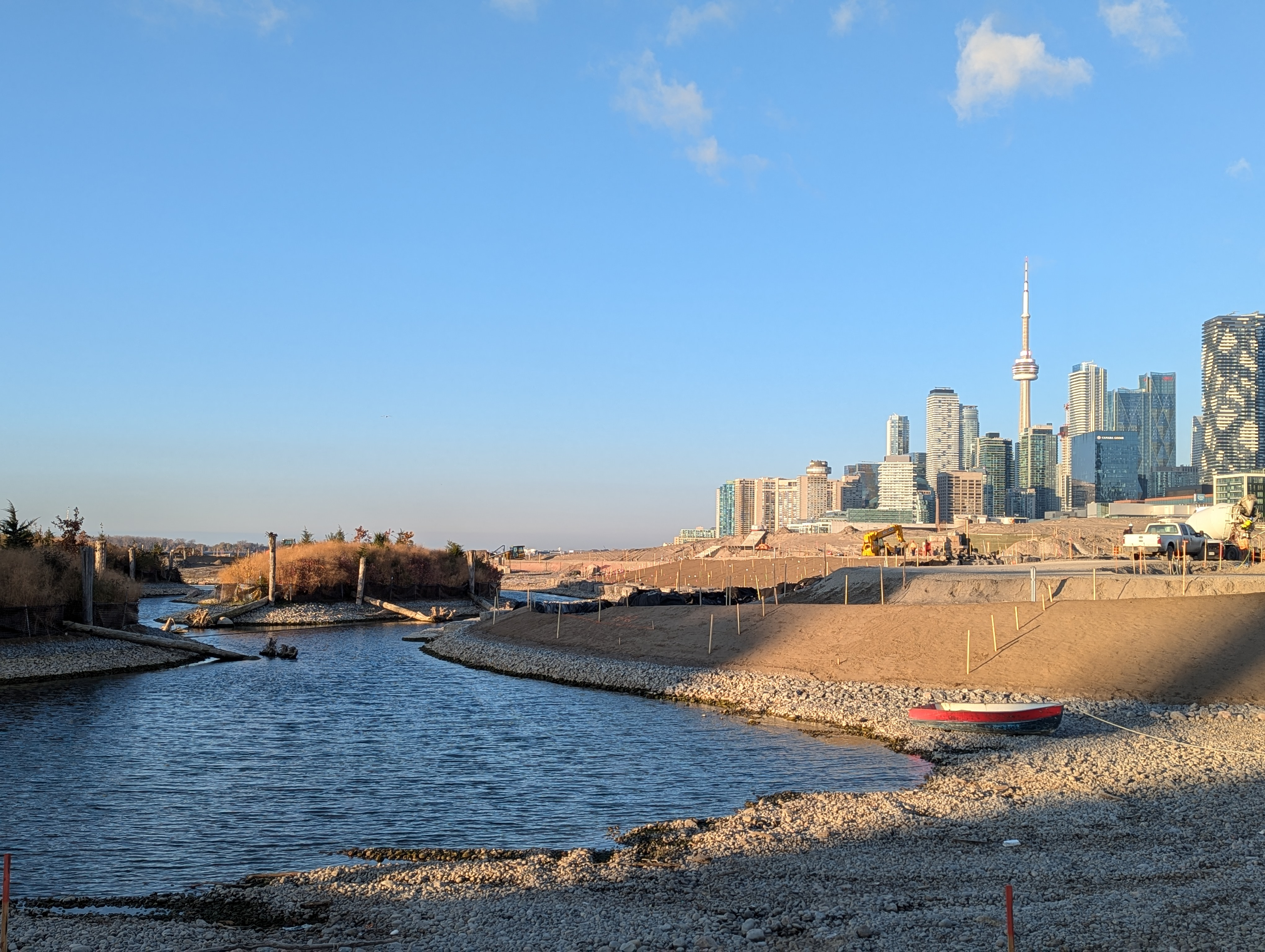
- The new mouth of the Don River

Location
- Country: Canada
- Province: Ontario
- Cities: Toronto; Markham; Vaughan; Richmond Hill

Physical characteristics
- Source: Oak Ridges Moraine
  - location: Ontario, Canada
  - coordinates: 43°59′20″N 79°23′57″W
- Mouth: Keating Channel and the Toronto Harbour
  - location: Ontario, Canada
  - elevation: 75 m (246 ft)
- Length: 38 km (24 mi)
- Basin size: 360 km^{2} (140 sq mi)
- Discharge
  - location: Keating Channel and the Toronto Harbour

Basin features
- Progression: Lake Ontario→ Saint Lawrence River→ Gulf of Saint Lawrence
- River system: Lake Ontario drainage basin
- Tributaries
  - left: Taylor-Massey Creek
  - right: German Mills Creek, Burke Brook, Mud Creek, Yellow Creek, Castle Frank Brook

The Don River is a watercourse in Ontario, Canada, that empties into Lake Ontario, at Toronto Harbour. Its mouth was just east of the street grid of the town of York, Upper Canada, the municipality that evolved into Toronto, Ontario. The Don is one of the major watercourses draining Toronto (along with the Humber, and Rouge Rivers) that have headwaters in the Oak Ridges Moraine.

The Don is formed from two rivers, the East and West Branches, that meet about seven kilometres (4 mi) north of Lake Ontario while flowing southward into the lake. The area below the confluence is known as the "lower Don", and the areas above as the "upper Don". The Don is also joined at the confluence by a third major branch, Taylor-Massey Creek. The Toronto and Region Conservation Authority (TRCA) is responsible for managing the river and its surrounding watershed.

== Toponymy ==
In 1788, Alexander Aitkin, an English surveyor who worked in southern Ontario, referred to the Don River as Ne cheng qua kekonk. Elizabeth Simcoe, wife of Lieutenant Governor John Graves Simcoe, reported in her diary that another name used was Wonscotanach. This is an Anishnaabe phrase meaning 'the river coming from the back burnt grounds', which could refer to an earlier forest fire in the poplar plains to the north. The name Don River was given by Lieutenant Governor Simcoe because the wide valley reminded him of the River Don in Yorkshire, England.

== History ==
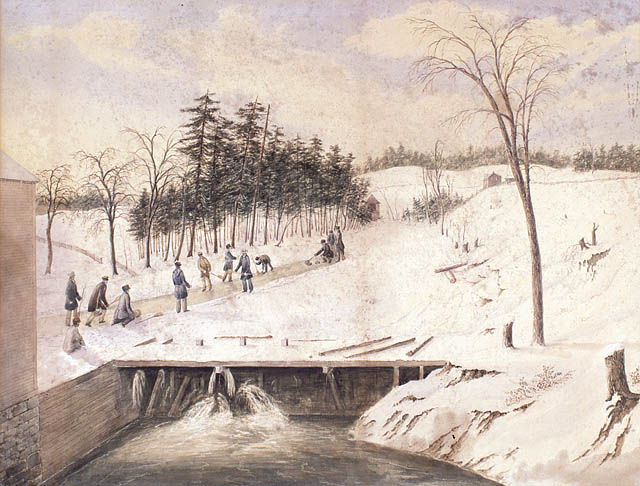
An 1836 watercolour depicting people curling on the Don River

Humans are believed to have first arrived in the Don River area approximately 12,500 years BP, most likely as nomadic hunters. While there is little archaeological evidence in the Don valley itself, regional finds in the Great Lakes St. Lawrence area have revealed that permanent settlements started to occur about 6000 BP. The most significant recorded find is known as the "Withrow Site". It was discovered in 1886 during road building just east of Riverdale Park. It contained human remains and other artifacts dating back to about 5000 years BP.

Wendat longhouse villages were developed along the river starting in the 1300s when corn became a staple food. In the 1700s, the Mississaugas moved into the region, seeing the Haudenosaunee withdraw south of Lake Ontario. The French were the first Europeans to visit the region, trading at posts in the area. In the 1760s, the French were displaced by the British after the fall of Quebec.

The British and the Mississaugas concluded the problematic Toronto Purchase treaty in 1787. Believing the purchase to be a rental of the area, and not the release of their rights to the land, the Mississaugas surrendered most of the land that would become York, and then Toronto, and York County to the British. After a land claims process, the surrender of aboriginal title to the Toronto Purchase lands was eventually concluded in 2010 for financial considerations.

After the founding of York in 1793, several mills were constructed along the lower Don. One of the first was at Todmorden Mills. These mills initially turned out lumber, flour and paper products. By the 1850s, there were more than 50 mills along the Don and its tributaries. The Lower Don was becoming an industrial setting. Petroleum storage facilities, poultry and pork processing plants were constructed along the banks of the Don. In 1879, the Don Valley Brick Works opened. Polluted effluent from these factories and the growing city nearby was turning the Don and its marshy mouth into a polluted hazard.

There were two prominent hills that were north of Bloor. "Sugar Loaf Hill" at Bloor Street was a conical hill removed during the construction of the Prince Edward Viaduct (commonly referred to as the Bloor Viaduct). "Tumper's Hill", near Don Mills Road, was flattened in the 1960s during the construction of the Don Valley Parkway.

In the 1880s, the lower part of the Don south of the former Winchester Street bridge was straightened (east of the original mouth) and placed in a channel to create additional harbour space and industrial dock space for boats. Known as "The Don Improvement Project", the straightened river was also supposed to divert the polluted waters into the Ashbridges Bay marsh. This proved unsuccessful so the mouth was turned 90 degrees west where it empties into the inner harbour. This short extension of the harbour is known as the Keating Channel. The channel north of Lake Shore Blvd. East ceased being navigable when the Gardiner Expressway was constructed in the 1950s. Large boats can no longer enter the Keating Channel due to the removal of the Cherry Street lift bridge and it's replacement by the Cherry Street North bridges.

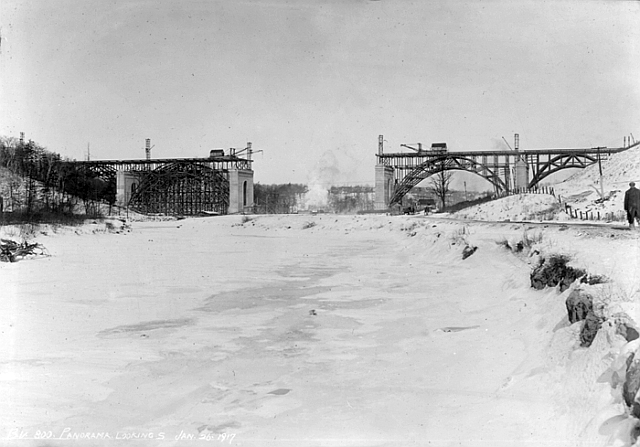
Construction of the Prince Edward Viaduct over the Don River in January 1917

During the early part of the 20th century the river and the valley continued to be neglected. 31 separate sewage treatment facilities were constructed along the river. Over 20 sites in the valley and adjacent ravines were used as landfills for garbage and industrial refuse. In 1917, the Don Destructor was built beside the river, just north of Dundas Street East. The incinerator operated for 52 years, burning about 50,000 tonnes of rubbish annually.

The Don River caught fire on at least two occasions in 1931 and 1943 because of industrial pollution from the McColl-Frontenac and British American Oil refineries.

In the 1910s through to the early 1930s, the Don Valley was used as a camping site by the homeless. These sites were commonly referred to as the "hobo jungle" of the valley. Campers at the hobo jungle were often harassed, arrested, and raided by police.

In 1946, a plan by the Shirriff company to demolish pioneer dwellings in the area of Todmorden Mills led outraged citizens to form the Don Valley Conservation Association volunteer organization. The Association's opposition was successful in causing Shirriff to abandon the project in 1947. The Association continued its activities, planting tree seedlings, halting the picking of wild flowers, particularly trilliums and preventing vandalism. The Association held educational events to educate the public about the Don Valley, including special trains through the valley, and a recreation of Lt. Governor Simcoe's journey up the Don by canoe. The Association also advocated for the building of trunk sewers to stop the run-off of pollution into the Don.

After World War II, rapid urban expansion occurred in the northern reaches of the watershed. At the same time, interest in conservation led to the formation of conservation authorities across Ontario for watershed management. Authorities were established to manage watersheds, and the Don Valley Conservation Authority was established in 1947. The authority had limited powers, and was funded by local municipalities which had to pay for specific land purchases. For example, a 1950 plan to build a large conservation area on the East Don River at Milne Hollow at Lawrence Avenue never came to fruition over the high cost of development.

In 1954, Hurricane Hazel struck the Toronto area. Most of the damage occurred in the Humber River area. While there was some flooding, substantially less rain fell over the Don Watershed and there was no loss of life. However, the impact of the hurricane led to changes for the conservation authorities in the Toronto region. In 1957, the DVCA, along with other Toronto-area conservation authorities, was reformed into the Metro Toronto and Region Conservation Authority and given a mandate to construct flood control features as well as acquire property in the Don and other valleys to prevent a future re-occurrence of the disaster. Large tracts of industrial land adjacent to the river were added to the regulatory floodplain. This meant that the MTRCA had a veto on any developments that were not flood-proofed. The MTRCA became the TRCA in 1998.

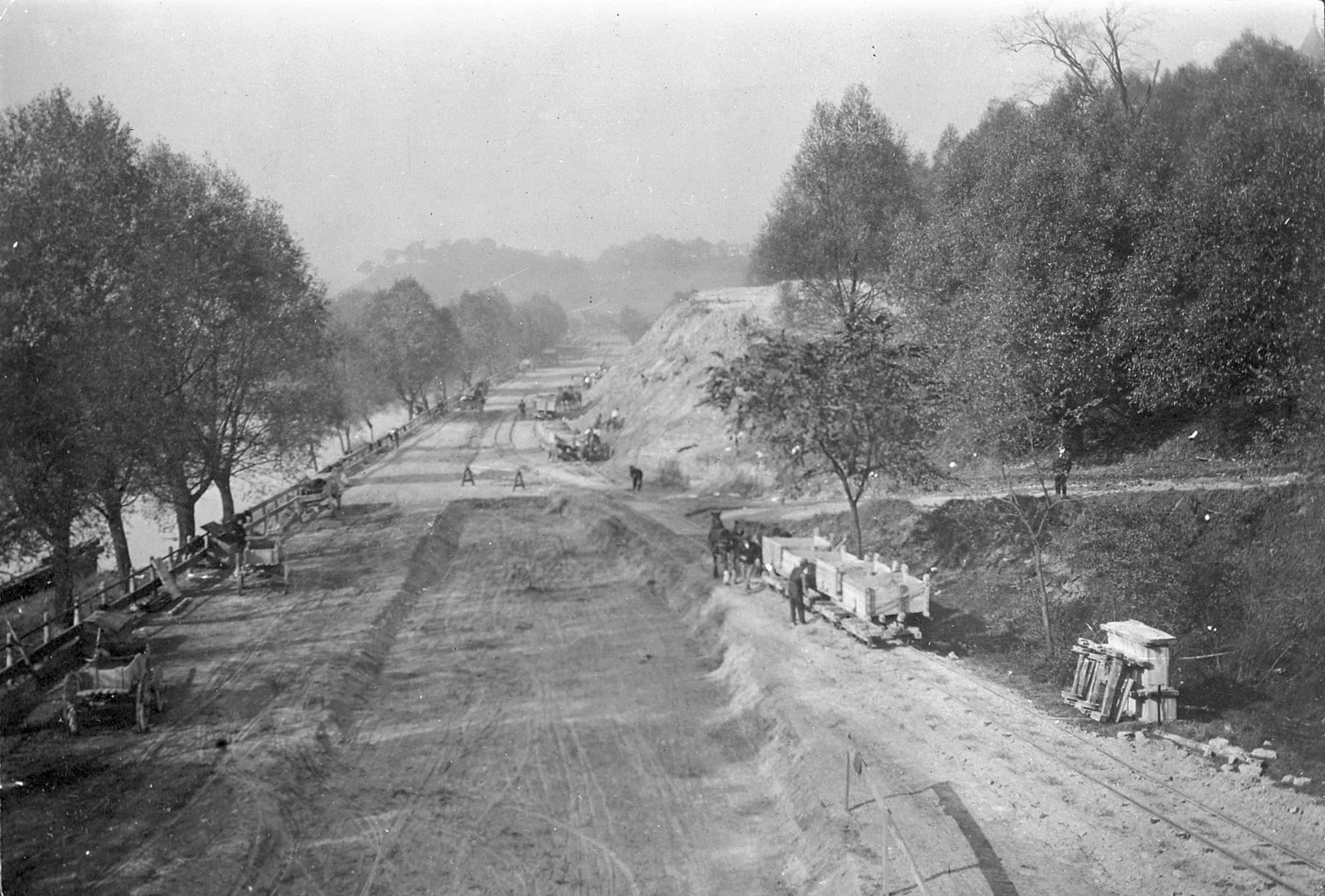
Construction of the Don Roadway along the eastern portion of Don Valley in 1910. Most of the Roadway was later incorporated into the Don Valley Parkway in the 1960s.

In the 1950s and early 1960s, the Don Valley Parkway (DVP) was constructed through the Lower Don to serve growing commuter traffic. The project was a large civil engineering project. Homes, farms, and cottages in the valley were expropriated. Two hills within the valley were leveled and the soil used for grading the highway. The railways and the river were re-routed, Don Mills Road was improved and the Eglinton Avenue and Lawrence Avenue concession roads were extended across the valley. At the intersection of Lawrence and the Parkway, the remains of the old village of Milneford Mills were removed. Bayview Avenue was extended south into the valley along the west bank of the valley.

Increasing development reduced the natural areas of the watershed. This impacted the Don with increased pollution, heavy flooding, and turbid sediment laden waters. The combined result meant that by the 1960s the river had become a neglected, polluted mess. In 1969, Pollution Probe held a much celebrated "Funeral for the Don" to highlight the plight of the river.

Efforts to restore the Don gathered steam in 1989 with a public forum at the Ontario Science Centre which was attended by about 500 people. The result was the formation of the Task Force to Bring Back the Don, a citizen's advisory body to Toronto City Council. Their mandate and vision was to make the Don "clean, green, and accessible". Since then they have hosted garbage cleanups, tree plantings, and help to create or restore eight wetlands in the lower reaches of the valley, including Chester Springs Marsh, a 3 hectares (7.4 acres) site south of the Bloor Viaduct. Other groups also became active including Friends of the Don East. In 1995, the MTRCA created the Don Watershed Regeneration Council to coordinate restoration efforts throughout the watershed.

In 1991 Bring Back the Don released a document called "Bringing Back the Don" which laid out plans for restoration, including a renaturalized mouth of the Don. In 1998 a plan to revive Toronto's waterfront was initiated. One of the four projects mentioned was a natural mouth for the Don River. In 2001 an environmental assessment was started to look into a natural mouth of the Don. The project was also coupled with a plan to handle a major flood modeled on the expected output from a Hurricane Hazel size storm. In 2007, the Toronto Waterfront Development Corporation (now WaterfrontToronto) held a design competition that looked at four different configurations for the mouth of the Don. The winning bid was made by Michael Van Valkenburgh Associates. The environmental assessment was completed in 2014 and construction began in 2016. In 2024, Waterfront Toronto announced that it had connected the Don River to the new mouth of the river channel and completed the creation of a new island, Ookwemin Minising. For the first time since the 1880s the Keating Channel was no longer the primary outlet for the river into Toronto Harbour.

Since the cessation of industrial pollution and the cleanup efforts by various groups, the river has regenerated to the point where a number of species of fish have returned to the river, and there is a limited sports fishery.

=== Wonscotonach Parklands (Don River Valley Park) ===
In October 2016, the city of Toronto announced the creation of a 200 acres (81 ha) Don River Valley Park that will stretch for 7 kilometres (4.3 mi) from the West Don Lands up to approximately Todmorden Village in the north. The park will have three zones, an urban zone from West Don Lands to Riverdale Park, a park zone from Riverdale north to Bloor and finally a natural zone for the remaining section to Todmorden Village. Trails for biking and pedestrian use will be connected from existing ones for recreational and transportation needs. Another aim for the park is restoration of land and the upper sections of the Don River. The project aims to revitalize the ravine space through a series of projects that will advance the priorities set out in the city of Toronto's Lower Don Trail Master Plan, prepared by DTAH. Together with a series of accessible new entry points, the Master Plan calls for the reclamation of former green spaces throughout the valley, including the former snow dump site north of the Bloor Viaduct. Naturalized ecological conditions throughout the valley would offer improved flood protection. A "nature-inspired" public art program is set to launch in 2017, aiming to strengthen the cultural presence of the Don Valley, which—according to the Master Plan—already serves as a de facto backyard to some 250,000 Torontonians. This new park will be under the management of the Toronto Parks, Forestry and Recreation Division. In 2018 City Council directed staff to consult community about naming the network of parks in the Lower Don "Wonscotonach Parklands", with Wonscotonach meaning "black burnt grounds" or "area previously swept by fire", deriving as an Anglicized form of the name "Waasayishkodenayosh" meaning "burning bright point" or "peninsula" in Anishinaabemowin.

== Geography ==
=== Geology ===
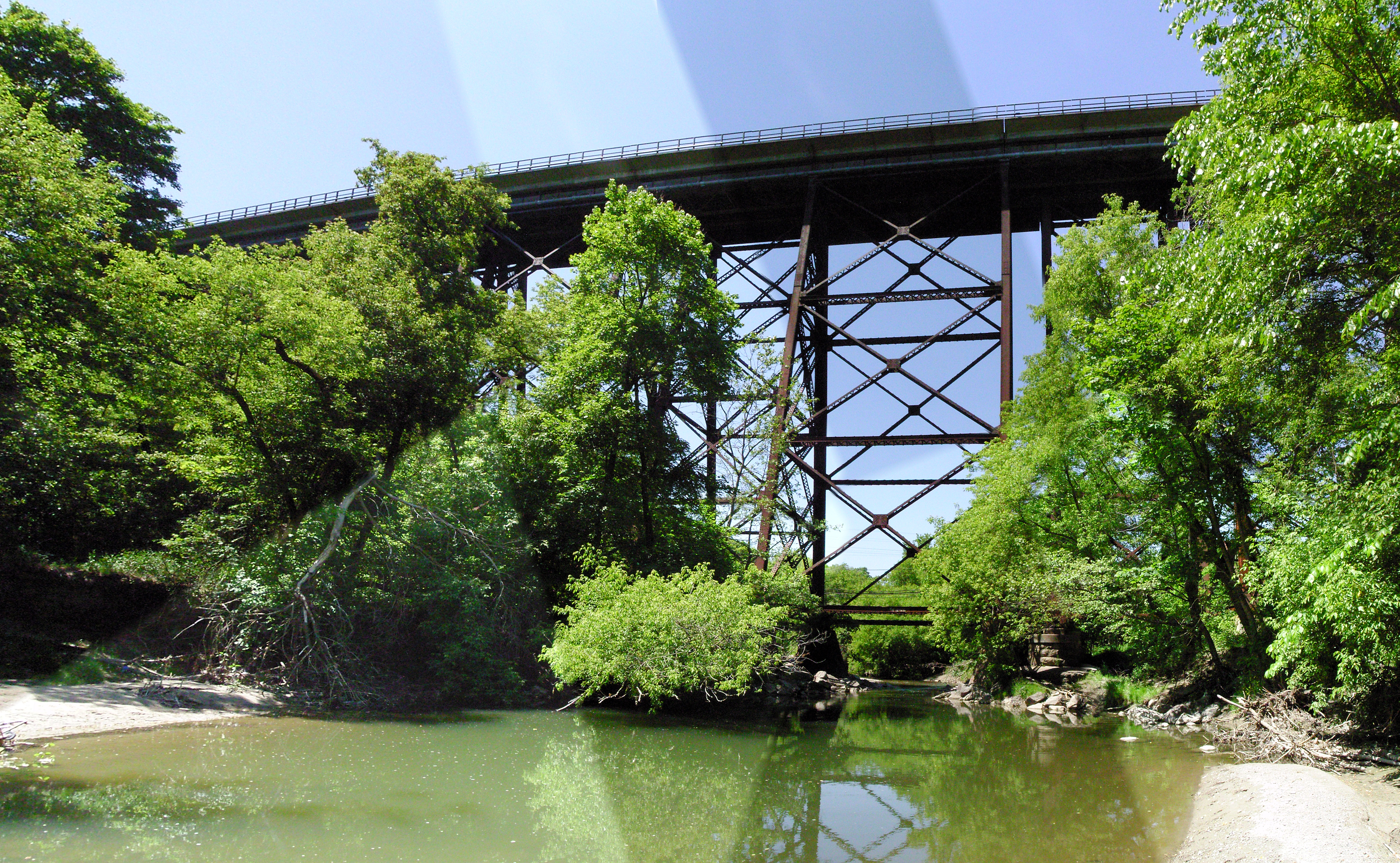
The Don Valley, which surrounds the lower portion of the Don River, is a 400-metre-wide (440 yd) valley in spite of the river being only 15 metres (16 yd) wide. The Valley's formation was a result of the last glacial period.

The Don Valley is notable because of its deep wide valley in the lower reaches. At the Bloor Street Viaduct, the valley is about 400 m wide while the river is only about 15 m wide. This is due to its glacial origins. The Don River and its deep valley were formed about 12,000 years ago at the end of the Wisconsinan Glaciation. During that glaciation which lasted for 35,000 years, all of Ontario was covered in ice. As the climate warmed the glaciers began to melt. As the ice front retreated in southern Ontario, several rivers were formed that drained into Lake Iroquois, a glacier lake which was the precursor to Lake Ontario. The Don River is now small in comparison to the deep and wide valley that resulted from its glacial origin. The Don River is now classified as an underfit river.

The landscape at that time was loose glacial till so the large amounts of glacier melt water eroded deep valleys over thousands of years. As time progressed, isostatic uplift caused the earth's plate to rise and tilt. This caused Lake Iroquois to drain towards the south. A remnant of its shoreline can be seen on the north side of Davenport Road in Toronto. In the Don Valley, the old shoreline is evident just north of Eglinton Avenue. Today the source of the Don River is the Oak Ridges Moraine, another legacy of the Wisconsin glaciation.

The location of the old shoreline delineates a change in the soils in the Don watershed. Soils north of the old shoreline are mostly luvisolic Halton Till while south of the shoreline they are sandy glaciolacustrine deposits.

The Don Valley provides an appropriate location for studying the regional geological history. The Don Valley Brick Works was an old brick making factory with a quarry where they extracted shale. At the rear wall, local geologists discovered a record of the past three glaciations. There are nine distinct layers visible dating back 120,000 years.

=== Hydrology ===
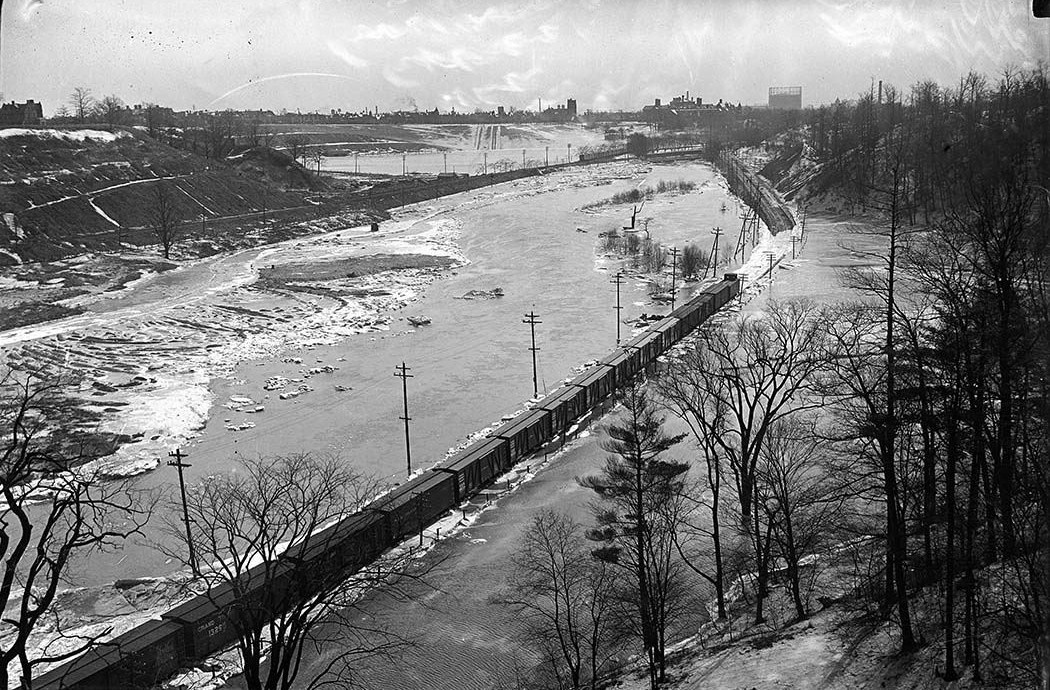
View of the Don River flooding the Don Valley south in February 1918. Water levels on the Don River can rise quickly following moderate to heavy rainfall.

Due to the urbanized nature of the watershed, the Don River experiences low base flows interspersed with high volume floods. The water level can rise very quickly following a moderate to heavy rainfall, up to 1–2 metres inside of three hours. The average base flow for the Don River is about 4 m^{3}/s. Peak flows occur in late February and late September which corresponds to seasonal variation in the Toronto region. Maximum flows, based on a Hurricane Hazel level flood have been estimated at nearly 1700 m^{3}/s. On August 19, 2005, an unusually strong summer storm caused short term flooding in the Don Valley. Peak flow rates for that event were measured at 55.3 m^{3}/s. Since high flow rates occur during storm events, the resulting floods tend to scour the bottom of the river which reduces fish habitat. In addition, the flood waters carry a large amount of sediment washed into the river from surrounding tablelands. The sediment collects in the Keating Channel just past the mouth of the river. The TRCA which is responsible for the dredging estimates that the amount of sediment dredged is 35,000 m^{3}/year weighing nearly 60,000 tonnes (59,000 long tons; 66,000 short tons).

=== Course and tributaries ===
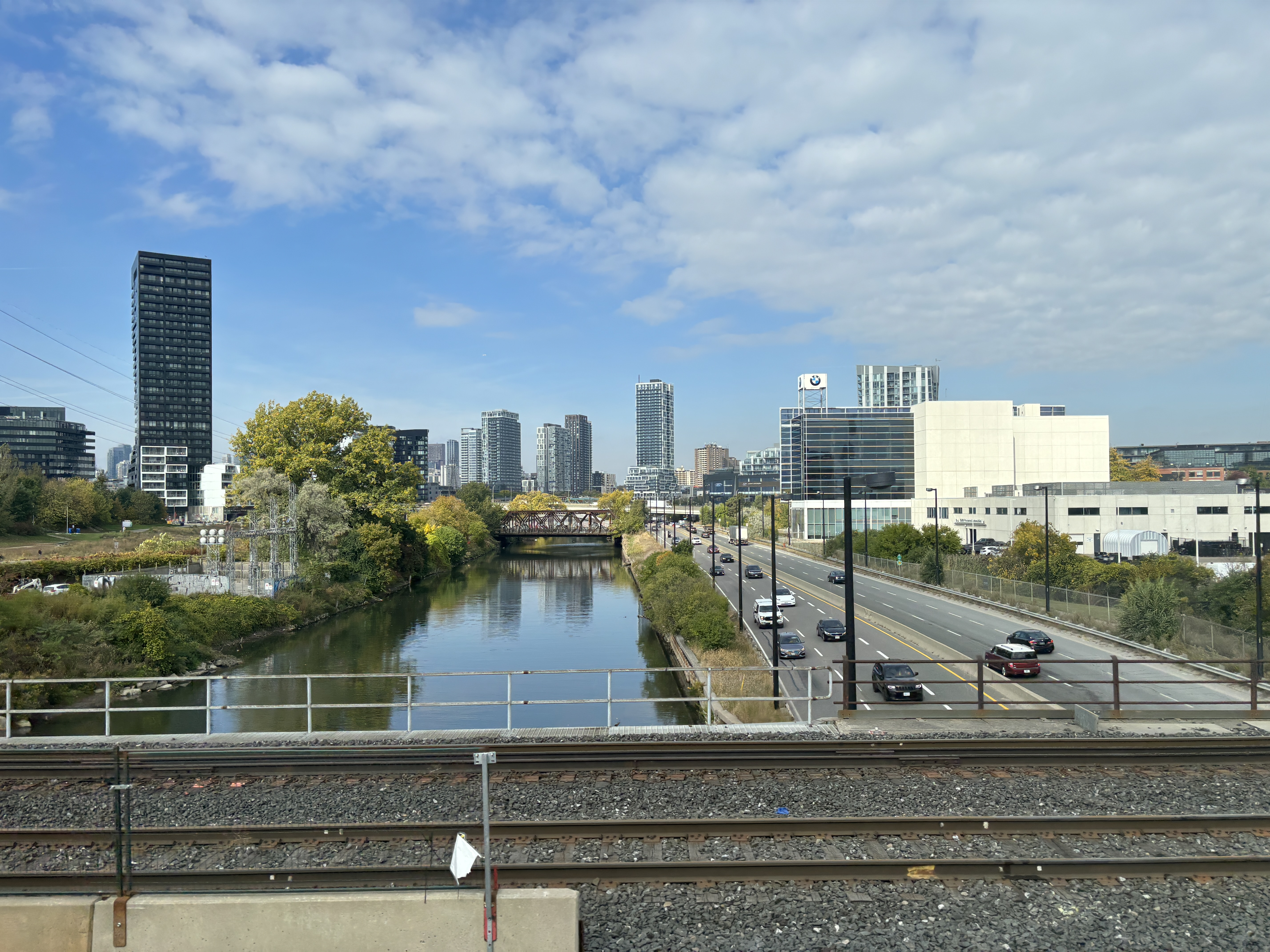
Don River near South Riverdale

The east branch of the Don, also called the Little Don River, rises at the south edge of the Oak Ridges Moraine just to the west of Yonge Street, flowing south-eastward through ravine forests in Richmond Hill, Thornhill, east of Willowdale and Don Mills.

A second branch of the eastern Don, known as German Mills Creek, parallels the main eastern branch and joins it at Steeles Avenue, the northern boundary of Toronto. South of Lawrence Avenue the river passes through the Charles Sauriol Conservation Reserve. This area is mostly undeveloped parkland. The reserve occupies the valley south to the forks of the Don. It was at one time home of a Maple sugar shack and tapline, which was visited yearly by students from across East York. Charles Sauriol was a historic protector of the Don.

The western branch starts Vaughan, in the Maple district; flowing south-east through the suburban industrial area of Concord, and the G. Ross Lord Reservoir. It crosses Yonge Street as it flows through Hoggs Hollow, past York University's Glendon ("valley of the Don") campus, and then flows on to Leaside, Flemingdon Park, and Thorncliffe Park before joining the eastern half.

The western section of Taylor-Massey Creek and the southern portion of the western branch are surrounded by parkland (see also: Toronto ravine system). In more recent years the retreat of the industrial plants and rail infrastructure has freed up room which is now being turned into bicycling trails, which now extend from the shore of Lake Ontario northward in several directions to provide some 30 km of off-road paved trails. While Toronto is fairly flat in general, local cyclists have developed a number of technically challenging singletrack trails throughout the area, following the main trails.

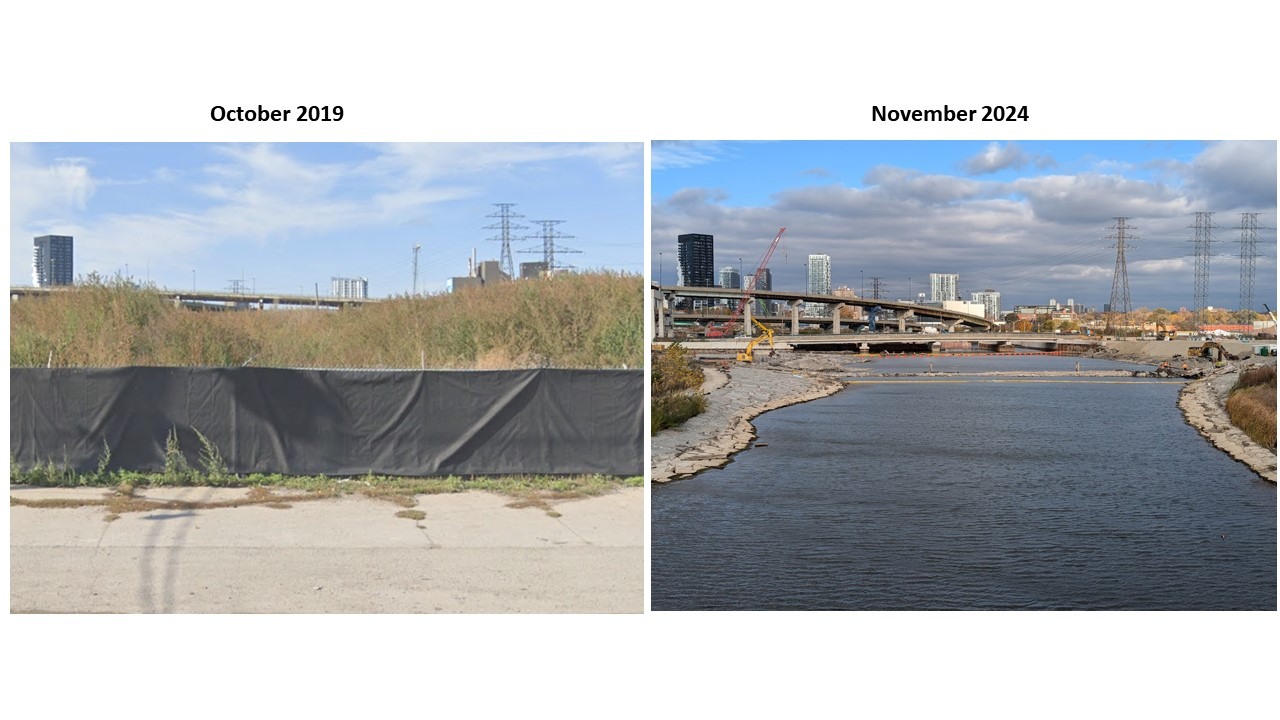
View looking north from Commissioners Street in 2019, before the new river valley was excavated, and in 2024, after the Don River was connected to the river valley. Ookwemin Minising is to the left of the river in the 2024 image, and Don Roadway is to the right.

Downstream from the forks, the river flows through a wooded area known as Crothers' Woods which is designated as an Environmentally Sensitive Area due to the high quality beech-maple forest that grows on the ravine slopes. South of Pottery Road it enters a more degraded section and ends up in a straightened section that includes cement and steel dock wall, a remnant from an earlier industrial era. The river flows from there into the Keating Channel at Lake Shore Boulevard East which is at the north east corner of the Toronto Harbour.

To control flooding from the Don River, Waterfront Toronto's Port Lands Flood Protection Project extended the river south past the Keating Channel (roughly parallel to the west side of the Don Roadway), and then west (roughly parallel to the south side of Commissioners Street) to a new mouth at Toronto Harbour. The man-made extension naturalized the river valley and provided new parkland. Since 2024, water now flows into the Keating Channel from the Don River and the new mouth of the river. A byproduct of the river extension is the creation of Ookewmin Minising, at the north-west corner of Toronto's Port Lands.

== Cleanup ==
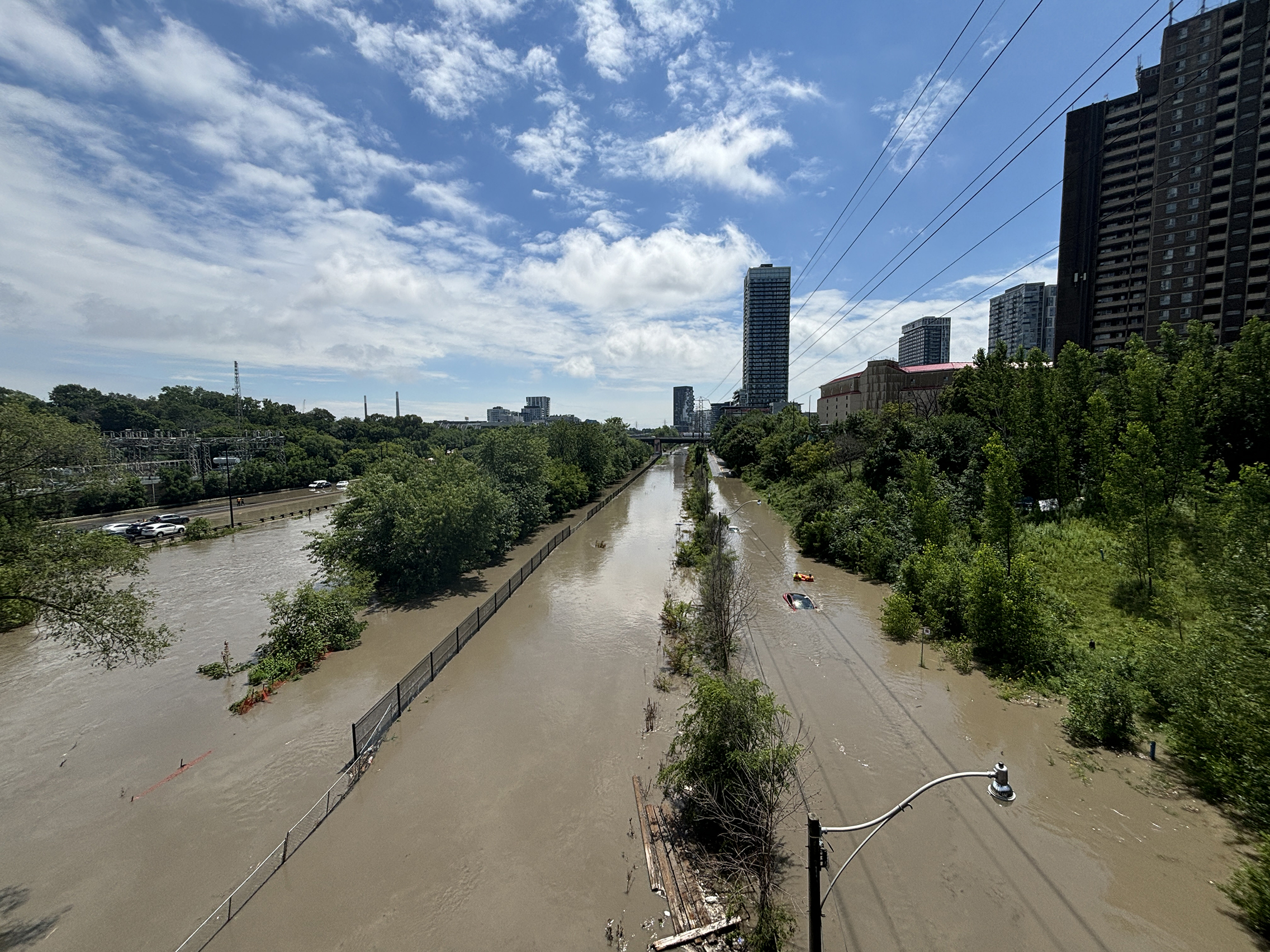
On July 16, 2024, the flooding of the Don River and the nearby Bayview Avenue

In the 1880s, sewers were laid through ravines in the Don Valley to carry sewage, offal and industrial effluents. Pollution and foul odours continued until the late 1950s. Since then, small improvements have been made. The city installed waste water storage tanks, required homeowners to disconnect downspouts, and swept streets for contaminants that flowed into waterways. Since 1979, the Lower Don has shown improvements in dissolved oxygen, phosphates and suspended solids; however by 2021, the tributary Taylor-Massey Creek had shown little improvement.

As of 2021, the Don River still suffers from sewage pollution during heavy rainfalls, when storm sewers carrying both rain water and sewage overflow into the Don River and its tributaries. To remedy this problem, the city is spending $3 billion to build three tunnels totaling 22 kilometres (14 mi) in length to divert sewage away from the river and redirect it to the Ashbridges Bay Treatment Plant. The project began in 2018 with an expected completion in 2038 of all three tunnels plus five storm water storage shafts. As of 2021, a tunnel boring machine has completed roughly half of the 10.4-kilometre (6.5 mi) Coxwell Bypass tunnel located 50 metres (160 ft) underground alongside the Lower Don south of the Leaside Bridge.

In October 2025, a peer-reviewed study found that the river carried the equivalent of 18-cars worth of microplastics into Lake Ontario every year.

In January 2026, the TRCA reported that over 20 species of fish had been recorded in the river in 2025, including the first Atlantic salmon recorded since 2012 and the first ever Emerald Bowfin. TRCA representatives attributed the slow recovery of the Don River’s fish communities to sustained cleanup and naturalization efforts.

== See also ==
- List of Ontario rivers
- List of bridges in Toronto
- Corktown Common
