= Taylor-Massey Creek =

River in Canada

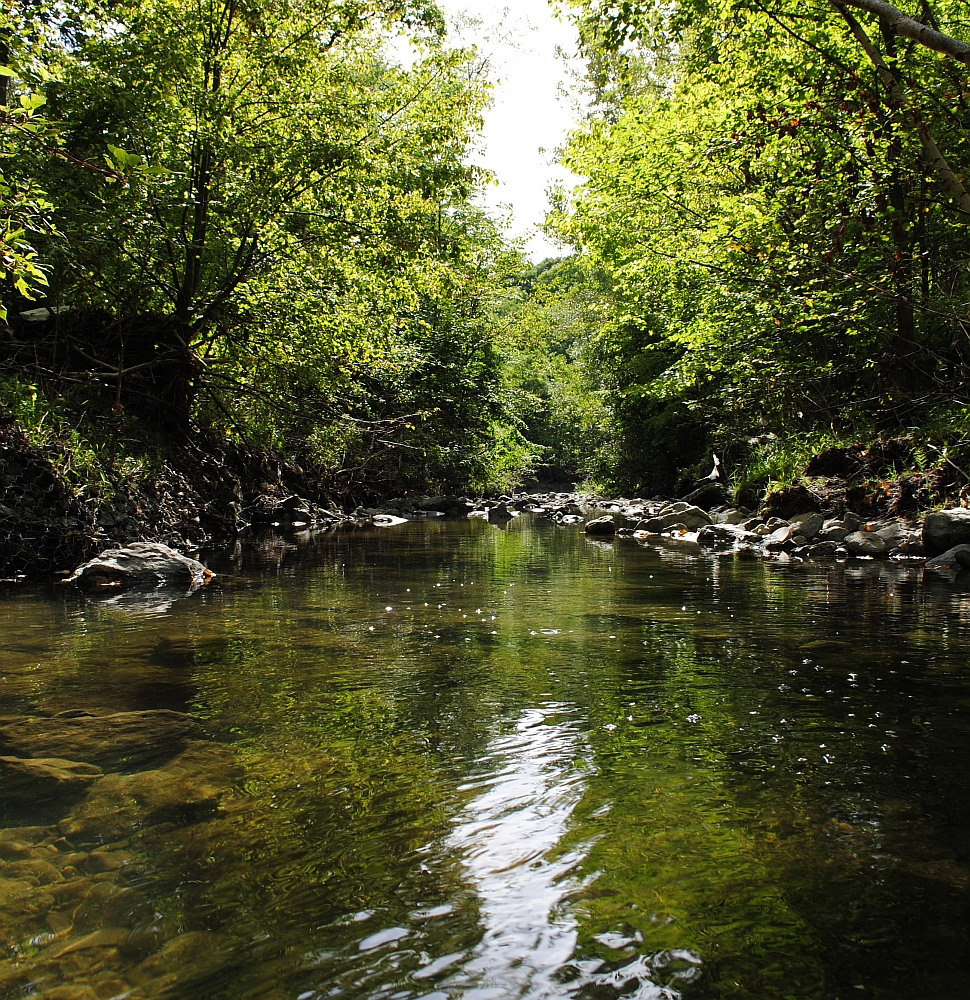
- Taylor-Massey Creek in Warden Woods Park, Scarborough

- Location of the mouth of the creek in Toronto

Location
- Country: Canada
- Province: Ontario
- Municipality: Toronto

Physical characteristics
- Source: Culvert in Terraview Willowfield Park
  - coordinates: 43°46′00″N 79°18′47″W
  - elevation: 169 m (554 ft)
- Mouth: Don River east branch
  - coordinates: 43°42′12″N 79°19′59″W
  - elevation: 86 m (282 ft)
- Length: 16 km (9.9 mi)

Taylor-Massey Creek is a tributary of the Don River in Toronto, Ontario. It flows through Scarborough and East York, where it enters the Don River. Taylor-Massey Creek has also been called Silver Creek and Scarboro Creek.

The creek is named after two prominent Toronto families. The Taylors were a wealthy family that owned and operated the Don Valley Brick Works. The Massey family owned the Massey-Harris farm equipment manufacturing company. Both families had sizable estates in the vicinity of the creek. The Massey Goulding Estate, a historic property at 305 Dawes Road, was originally part of the Massey estate and is now used as the Children's Peace Theatre. The mansion was built in 1921 for Dr. Arthur Goulding and his wife, Dorothy Massey, daughter of Walter and Susan Massey.

== Description ==
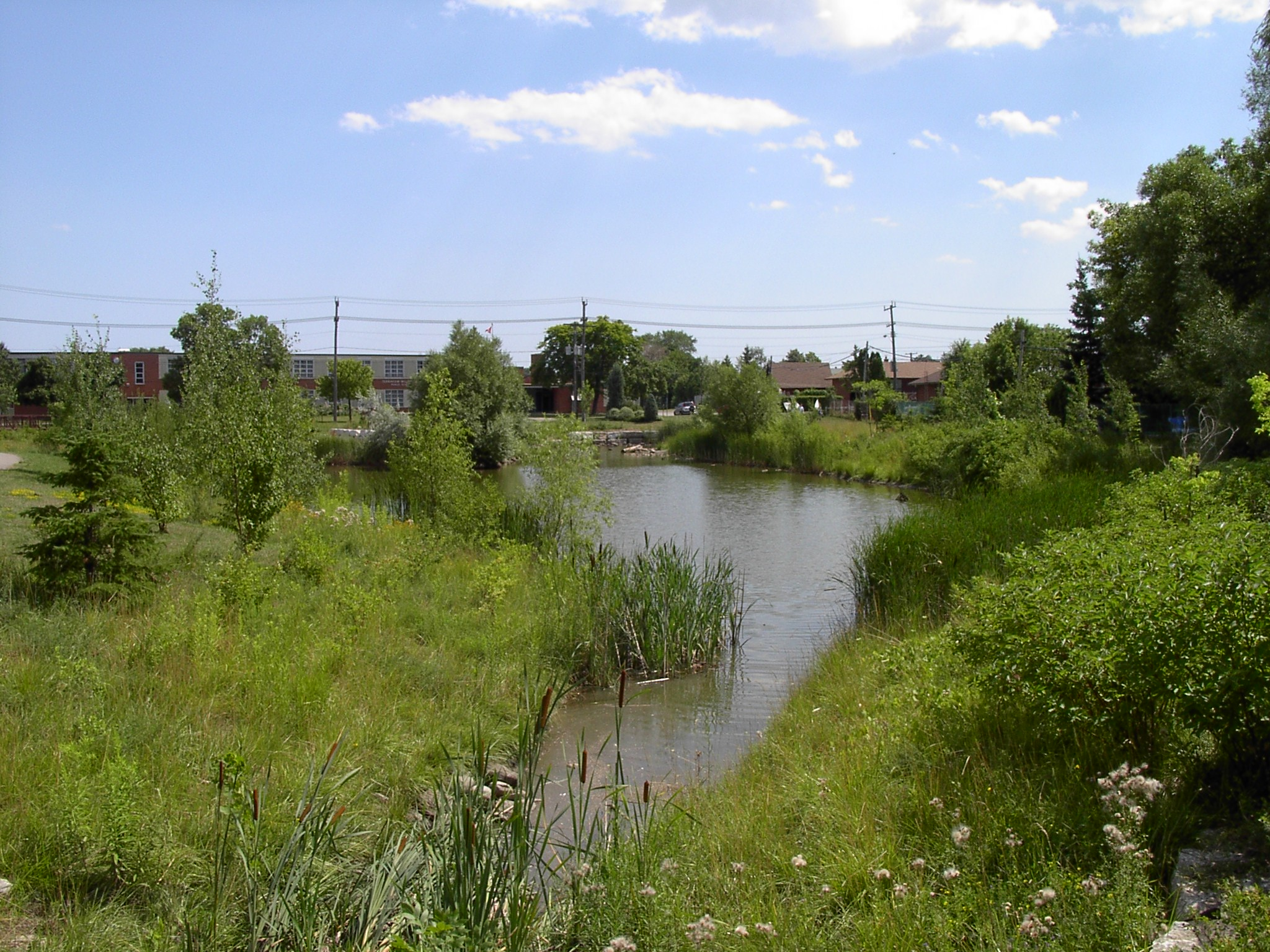
Terraview Willowfield Park

Taylor-Massey Creek is 16 kilometres long. Its headwaters are near Sheppard and Victoria Park Avenues. It flowed diagonally through Wishing Well Park and under Highway 401 at Pharmacy Avenue. The original headwaters were diverted to Highland Creek when the highway was widened to 12 lanes, so the creek now starts at a stormwater outfall just south of the highway.

The creek starts in Terraview Willowfield Park, a restoration project, named after a nearby public school. It flows through two medium-sized ponds with naturalized channels. From there it flows southeast through a series of concrete lined channels and drains. This section runs along an abandoned hydro right-of-way before entering a residential and industrial section that is closed to public access.

South of Eglinton Avenue East it enters a shallow ravine and flows south passing through Pine Hills Cemetery. It exits the cemetery travelling west and enters a small park on St. Clair Avenue East. At Warden Avenue it turns southwest, moving through a park called Warden Woods. West of Pharmacy Avenue it enters a city run golf course. At Victoria Park Avenue it enters Taylor Creek Park and continues uninterrupted to where it empties into the Don River East Branch, just north of the forks of the Don.

== Problems ==
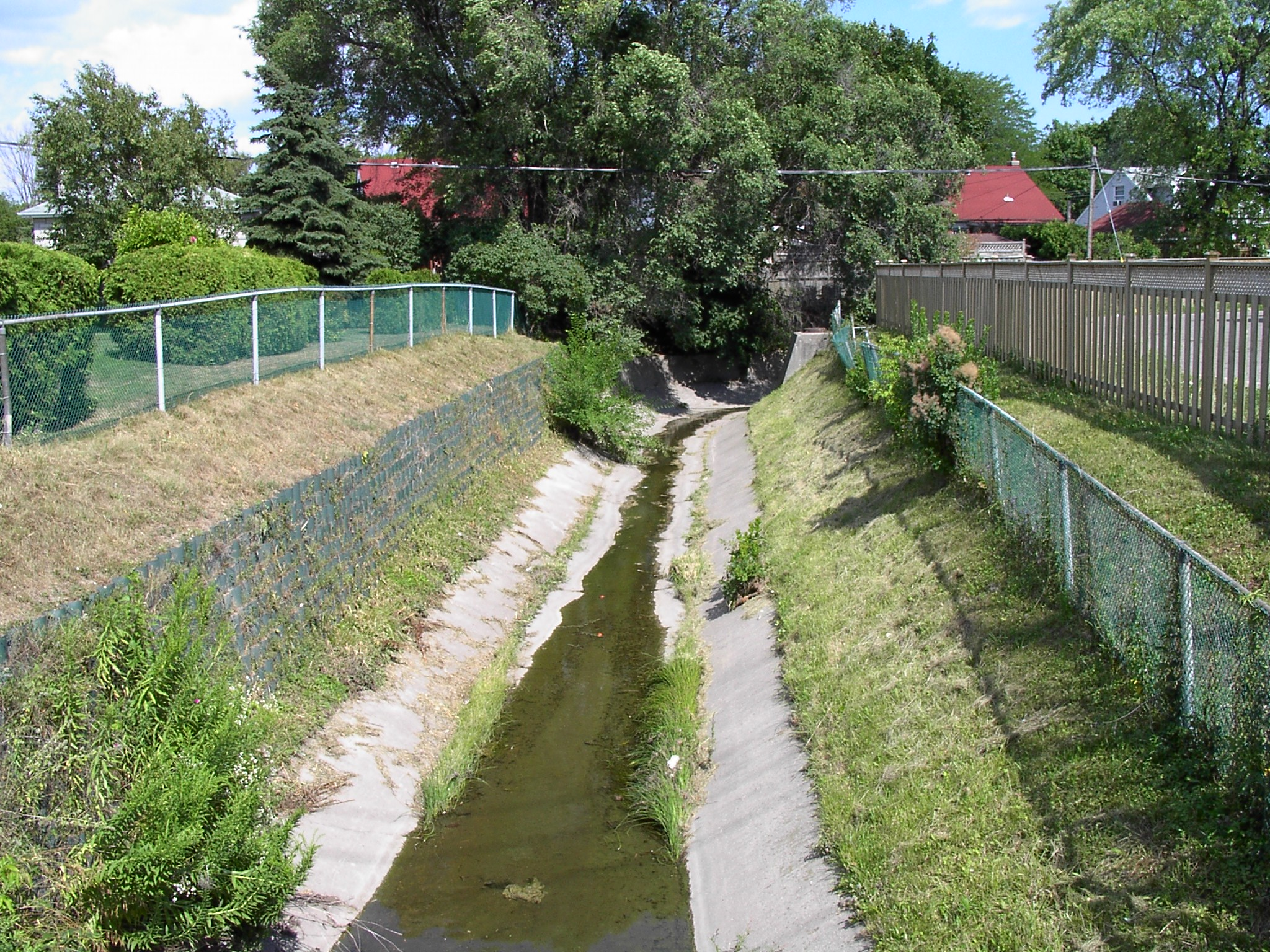
Channelized Creek

The Taylor-Massey Creek watershed exists entirely within an urban setting and has suffered severe degradation. The upper portion of the creek is encased almost entirely in concrete lined channels which increases the flow of the river and provides little habitat. Other sections are constrained by rock filled gabion baskets. The water is heavily polluted from storm water outfalls that empty directly into the creek.

In June 2005, the city performed a water quality study that revealed the presence of high levels of E. coli bacteria and other contaminants. Periodic spills from adjacent industrial lands have also increased contamination. Due to the poor water quality and the engineered riverbanks, the creek shows little signs of life.

Several places in the ravine were also once municipal landfills, although all of them have now been shut down.

== Restoration efforts ==
In 1993, a citizens group called Friends of the Don East (FODE) began environmental restoration projects along the creek, as well as along local branches of the East and West Don rivers. FODE created The Taylor Massey Project, in 2003, which became a separate organization in November, 2004.

In 2003, the City of Toronto implemented the Wet Weather Flow Management Master Plan which calls for a reduction of storm water flow into Taylor-Massey Creek and also recommends a restoration plan that will improve habitat in the creek for fish and other water dwelling organisms. In September, 2006, The TMP recommended the establishment of a Taylor Massey Watershed Management Co-ordinator as the best means of implementing Wet Weather Flow in the watershed, which is a priority under this 25-year, $1B plan. The city has also pledged to locate illegal sewer hookups and redirect them into sanitary sewers.

== See also ==
- List of rivers of Ontario
