= Task Force to Bring Back the Don =

Task Force to Bring back the Don
- Abbreviation: TFBBD
- Formation: 1989
- Dissolved: 2010
- Type: Municipal advisory committee
- Purpose: Environmental
- Headquarters: Toronto, Ontario, Canada
- Staff: 1
- Volunteers: 20

The Task Force to Bring Back the Don was a citizen advisory committee that advised the city council of Toronto, Ontario, Canada, on issues concerning the Don River and its watershed. It consisted of up to 20 citizen members and 3 council members. It was formed in 1989 and disestablished in 2010.

== History ==
On September 7, 1989, city council established the Interim Task Force on the Don River Clean-Up. The impetus for the creation of the Task Force was a public meeting held 5 months earlier on April 1, 1989 at the Ontario Science Centre attended by about 500 people who were interested in cleaning up the Don. At the time the Don River was seriously neglected and polluted. At the same time, an article entitled "Rebirth of a River" was published in the Globe and Mail newspaper that detailed the current state of the river and its issues and challenges.

In 1991, the Task Force published a book entitled Bringing Back the Don. The book detailed visions for restoration of the Don Valley potential methods for doing so.

In addition to the advisory committee, the Task Force sponsored restoration projects. These included tree plantings and wetland restorations. In 1996 the Task Force launched a major wetland restoration project called the "Demonstration Wetland". It was later renamed "Chester Springs Marsh". Two basins were excavated adjacent to the river and these periodically flood with river water.

The Task Force either created or enhanced four more wetlands in the Don Valley and another three in nearby tributary ravines.

The Task Force advised the city on environment related issues including the sewer use bylaw, road salt reduction, snow dump sites, the Wet Weather Flow Master Plan, and flood protection of the lower Don.

The Task Force also sought to create a naturalized mouth for the Don River, which empties into a concrete lined harbour waterway called the Keating Channel.

== Structure ==
Members of the Task Force were appointed for a three-year term in parallel with the term of council at the time. One member was appointed as chair by the committee for the same three-year term. After 2001, the committee appointed a vice-chair who chaired meetings whenever the chair was unavailable or declared a conflict of interest during a point of discussion. Members were recruited through the city appointment process. The Task Force interviewed prospective members to ensure that they had an interest in the Don River and could participate in the goals of the committee.

The Task Force had three sub-committees called teams where individual members discussed issues in detail. The teams reported back to the Task Force once per month and tabled motions if necessary. The teams were Habitat Restoration; Policy & Planning; and Communications, Outreach, and Marketing.

The Task Force had the support of some city staff who were more or less dedicated to Task Force business. The city clerk's office assigned a person who sent out a printed agenda and took minutes during the monthly meetings. Another employee in the Planning Department assisted with editing the newsletter which was produced twice per year, website updates, and other Task Force material including educational material.

To support the Task Force's restoration initiatives, there was an employee in the city's Parks and Forestry department who was responsible for projects in the Lower Don. Originally the person was hired specifically for the Task Force but the position evolved to include other similar responsibilities.
