= Peter Van Alstine =

Canadian politician

Peter Van Alstine (Vanalstine) (1743–1811) was a farmer, soldier and political figure in Upper Canada.

He was born in Kinderhook, New York, in 1743. He served as a major in the Board of Associated Loyalists during the American Revolution. He helped settle a group of Quakers and a number of former Loyalist soldiers in the Bay of Quinte area. Van Alstine first settled in Adolphustown Township in Upper Canada. He was made a justice of the peace in Montreal District in 1785 and became a justice of the peace in the Mecklenburg District in 1788. He was elected to the Legislative Assembly of Upper Canada to represent Prince Edward and Adolphustown in a 1793 by-election after his neighbour Philip Dorland was unseated because he could not take the oath of office as a Quaker. A slaveowner, he opposed the 1793 Act Against Slavery passed by the 1st Parliament of Upper Canada. Van Alstine later moved to Marysburgh Township in Prince Edward County near the current site of Glenora where he built a gristmill in 1806, which is still known today as Van Alstine's Mill. He operated a ferry between this location and Adolphustown. A small settlement developed in the area around his mill.

Van Alstine died at Adolphustown in 1811. His mill stayed in the Van Alstine family until the late 1830s. Hugh Macdonald, the father of John A. Macdonald, was the miller there from 1829 until 1836.
