= Adolphustown =

Former township now part of Greater Napanee, Ontario, Canada

Coordinates: 44.063783°N 77.006528°W

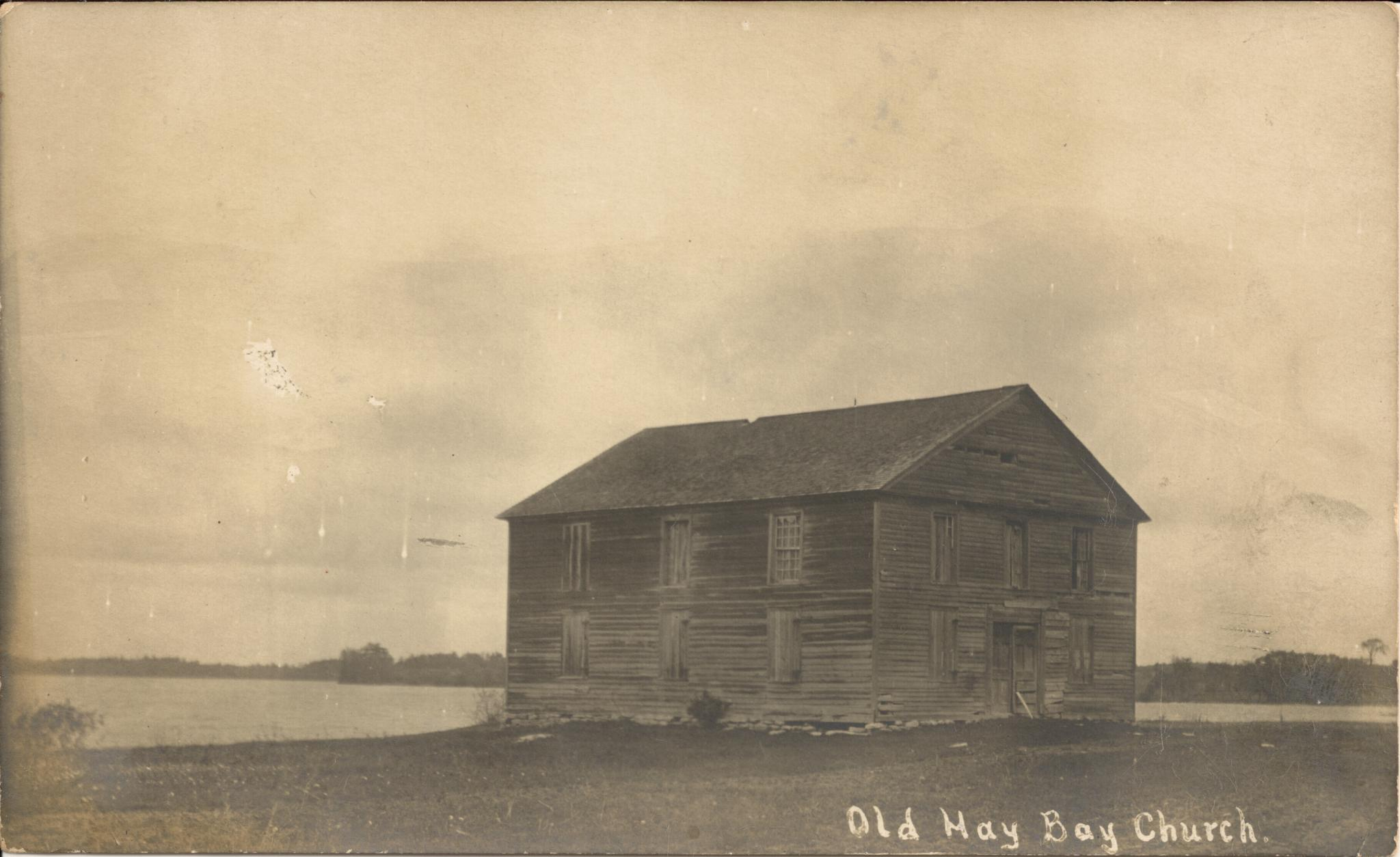
Old Hay Bay Church, c. 1908

Adolphustown is a geographic area located in Greater Napanee, Ontario, Canada, on the Adolphus Reach of the Bay of Quinte in Lake Ontario. Adolphustown is now part of the town of Greater Napanee. The rural character of the Adolphustown region remains largely undisturbed today, and the area, with its picturesque lakefront location, remains popular for cultivating apples and strawberries.

== History ==
Adolphustown was founded in 1784 by United Empire Loyalists. The original Loyalist Landing site is now the 74-acre (300,000 m^{2}) U.E.L. Heritage Centre & Park, a museum, public park, and family campground.

The settlement was named for Prince Adolphus, Duke of Cambridge, seventh son of King George III. A number of Quakers settled in this area in 1784 and held their first Monthly Meetings in Canada here.

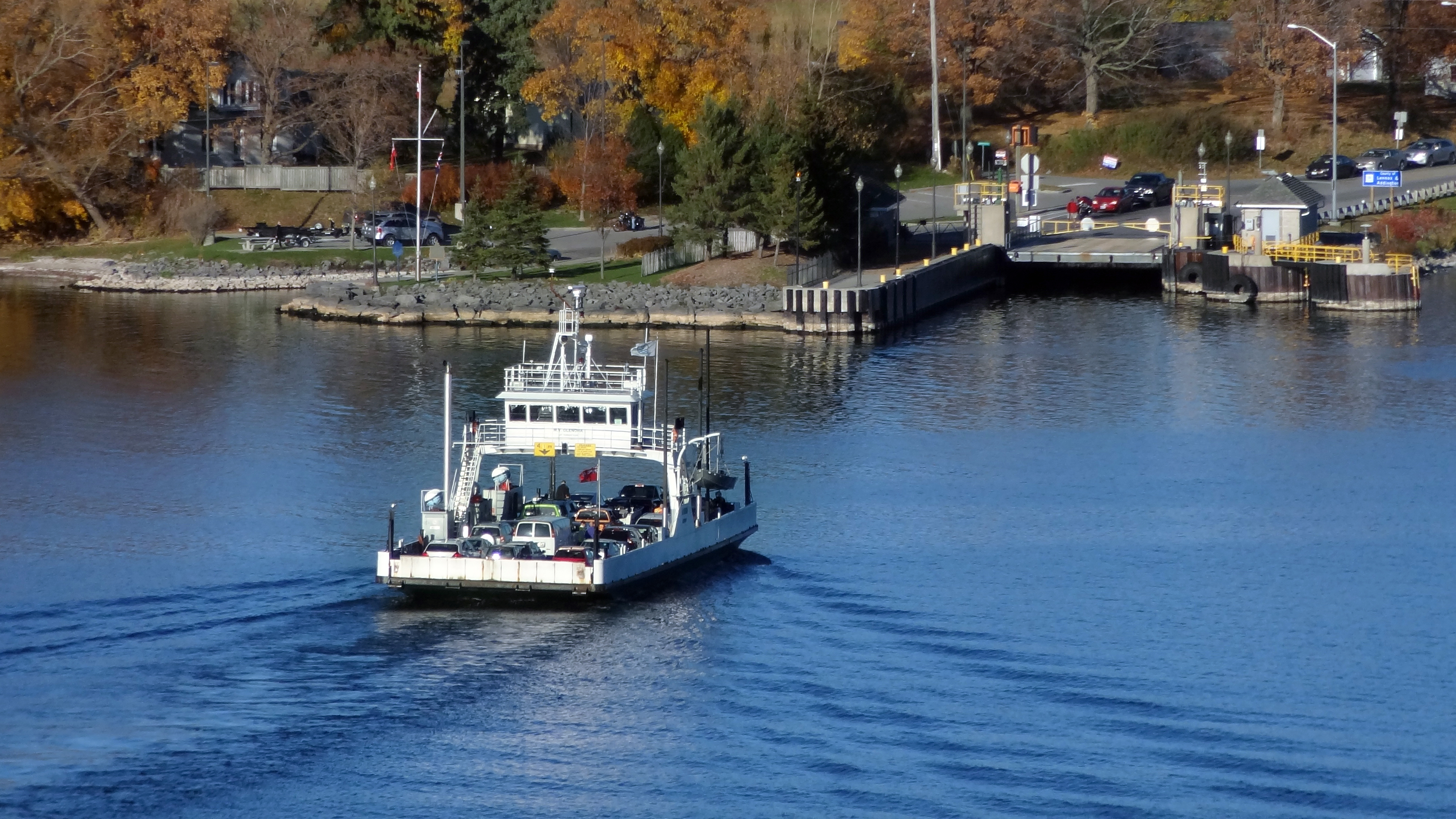
Glenora Ferry arriving in Adolphustown

The settlement serves as the eastern terminus of the ferry crossing to Glenora, Ontario. The ferry is free for vehicles and pedestrians and links the western and eastern halves of one of the oldest colonial roads in the province, the Loyalist Parkway (Ontario Highway 33), at the point where the parkway is interrupted by the Bay of Quinte. This crossing appears to have been in use at least as early as 1802, when an extension of Asa Danforth Jr.'s pioneering road, from eastern Toronto through what is now Trenton, first reached the Bay of Quinte at Stone Mills (Glenora).

By 1869, Adolphustown was a station on the Grand Trunk Railway with a population of 100 in the Township of Adolphustown, County of Lennox, and on the shore of the Bay of Quinte. The principal trade was in grain stock and cordwood. Land averaged from $30 to $40 per acre.

Other development—such as the 1817 York Road, the 1856 Grand Trunk Railway, and 1964 segment of Highway 401—took a more northern route through Napanee-Belleville.

== Notable people ==
- David Wright Allison, politician, farmer, manufacturer, and speculator.
- Bob Casey, professional baseball player.
- Samuel Casey, farmer and political figure in Upper Canada.
- Willet Casey, farmer and political figure in Upper Canada.
- James Cotter, farmer, judge, and political figure in Upper Canada.
- Philip Dorland, farmer and political figure in Upper Canada.
- Thomas Dorland, farmer, enslaver, soldier, and political figure in Upper Canada.
- Daniel Hagerman, lawyer and political figure in Upper Canada.
- John Roblin, farmer and political figure in Upper Canada.
- Henry Ruttan, businessman, inventor, and political figure in Upper Canada.
- Peter Van Alstine, farmer, soldier, and political figure in Upper Canada.

== See also ==
- List of communities in Ontario
- Royal eponyms in Canada
