= 10th Parliament of Upper Canada =

Parliament for Upper Canada 1829–1830

The 10th Parliament of Upper Canada was opened 8 January 1829. Elections in Upper Canada had been held in July 1828. All sessions were held at York, Upper Canada. This parliament was dissolved 8 September 1830 on the announcement of the death of King George IV.

The House of Assembly of the 10th Parliament of Upper Canada had two sessions 8 January 1829 to 6 March 1830:

Both the House and Parliament sat at the old York Court House on King Street.

Sessions	Start	End
1st	8 January 1829	20 March 1829
2nd	8 January 1830	6 March 1830

== Members ==
Riding	Member	First elected/ previously elected	No. of terms
Carleton	Thomas Mabon Radenhurst	1828	1st term
Dundas	Peter Shaver	1820, 1828	2nd term*
Dundas	George Brouse	1828	1st term
Durham	John David Smith	1828	1st term
Durham	Charles Fothergill	1825	2nd term
Essex	John Alexander Wilkinson	1824	2nd term
Essex	François Baby	1820	3rd term
Frontenac	Hugh Christopher Thomson	1824	2nd term
Frontenac	Thomas Dalton	1828	1st term
Glengarry	Alexander Fraser	1828	1st term
Glengarry	Alexander McMartin	1828	1st term
Grenville	George Longley	1828	1st term
Grenville	Rufus C. Henderson	1828	1st term
Halton	George Rolph	1828	1st term
Halton	Caleb Hopkins	1828	1st term
Hastings	Joseph N. Lockwood	1828	1st term
Hastings	James Hunter Samson	1828	1st term
Kent	William Bent Berczy	1828	1st term
Kingston	Donald Bethune	1828	1st term
Lanark	William Morris	1820	3rd term
Leeds	John Kilborn	1828	1st term
Leeds	William Buell	1828	1st term
Lennox & Addington	Marshall Spring Bidwell – Speaker 1829–1830	1824	2nd term
Lennox & Addington	Peter Perry	1824	2nd term
1st & 2nd Lincoln County	William Terry	1828	1st term
1st & 2nd Lincoln	William Woodruff	1828	1st term
3rd Lincoln	John Johnston Lefferty	1824	2nd term
4th Lincoln	Robert Randal	1820	3rd term
Middlesex	John Matthews	1824	2nd term
Middlesex	John Rolph	1824	2nd term
Niagara (town)	Robert Dickson	1828	1st term
Norfolk	Duncan McCall	1824	2nd term
Norfolk	William Warren Baldwin	1820, 1828	2nd term*
Northumberland	James Lyons	1824	2nd term
Northumberland	Benjamin Ewing	1824	2nd term
Oxford	Thomas Hornor	1820	3rd term
Oxford	Finley Malcolm	1828	1st term
Prescott & Russell	Donald Macdonell	1824	2nd term
Prince Edward	James Wilson	1820	3rd term
Prince Edward	Paul Peterson	1828	1st term
Simcoe	John Cawthra	1828	1st term
Stormont	Archibald McLean	1820	3rd term
Stormont	Ambrose Blacklock	1828	1st term
Wentworth	George Hamilton	1820	3rd term
Wentworth	John Willson	1820	3rd term
York (town)	John Beverley Robinson	1820	3rd term
York (town)	Robert Baldwin (1829)	1829	1st term
York	Jesse Ketchum	1828	1st term
York	William Lyon Mackenzie	1828	1st term

== See also ==
- Legislative Council of Upper Canada
- Executive Council of Upper Canada
- Legislative Assembly of Upper Canada
- Lieutenant Governors of Upper Canada, 1791–1841
- Historical federal electoral districts of Canada
- List of Ontario provincial electoral districts
