= Jesse Ketchum =

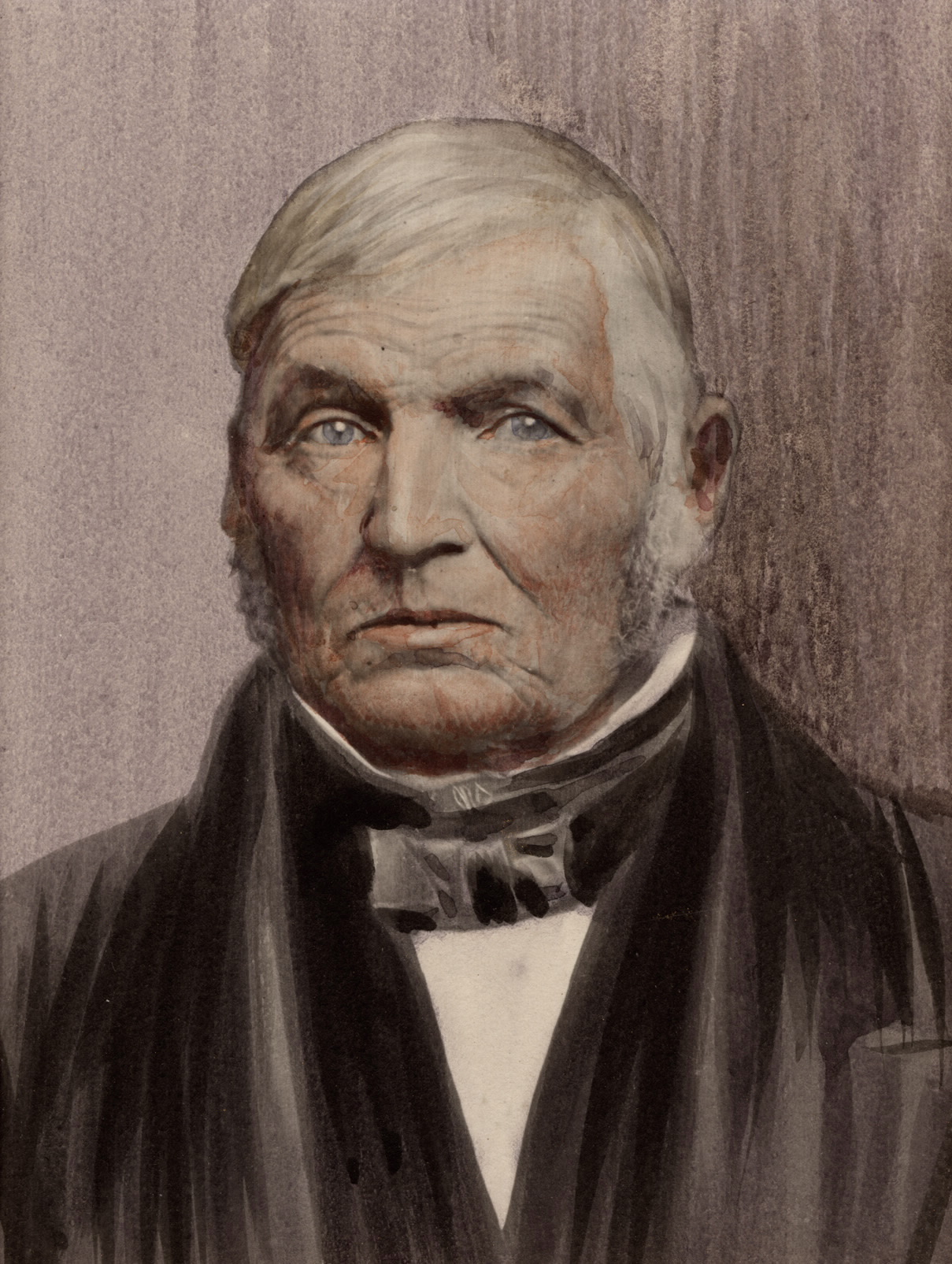

Member of the 10th Parliament of Upper Canada for York
- In office 8 January 1829 – 6 March 1830

Personal details
- Born: 31 March 1782 Spencertown, New York
- Died: 7 September 1867 (aged 85) Buffalo, New York
- Relations: Seneca Ketchum (brother)
- Parent(s): Mollie Robbins Ketchum; Jesse Ketchum Sr

Jesse Ketchum (March 31, 1782 – September 7, 1867) was a tanner and political figure in Upper Canada.

== Early life ==
He was born in Spencertown, New York, in 1782 to parents Mollie Robbins Ketchum and Jesse Ketchum Sr. After his mother died, he was taken into a foster home; his foster father was a tanner. He ran away from home in 1799 and joined his brother Seneca (1780–1850), who was farming north of York (York Mills, now part of Toronto) in Upper Canada.

== Career ==
At the beginning of the War of 1812, he purchased a tannery from a recent immigrant from the United States who had decided to return there after war was declared. Ketchum joined the local militia, but his loyalty was called into question after York was temporarily held by the Americans. After the war, he helped fund the rebuilding of the bridges over the Don River and also contributed to the building of the first common school at York. Ketchum was known for his great and practical interest in schools, a quality that won him the affectionate title, "Father Ketchum." He taught Sunday school at the Methodist church, which he helped to establish in the area. He opposed the exclusive control of the clergy reserves by the Anglican church and was known as an opponent of the Family Compact. In 1828, he was elected to represent York in the 10th Parliament of Upper Canada; he was reelected in 1830 but did not run again in 1834. Although he had supported William Lyon Mackenzie in the assembly, he did not take part in the Upper Canada Rebellion.

Shortly after the rebellion, he relocated his tannery to Buffalo, New York, although he continued to live in Toronto. In 1845, he moved to Buffalo, leaving his property in Toronto to his children from his first wife. He continued to be a generous benefactor to the community there until his death in 1867. Ketchum contributed to churches and schools in Buffalo. Ketchum Hall at Buffalo State University was named in his honour, as is Ketchum Street on the city's Lower West Side. Ketchum is buried at Forest Lawn Cemetery in Buffalo. A public school in Toronto was named "The Jesse Ketchum School" and in Buffalo twelve schools were named after him. His brother Seneca remained in Canada and died in York Mills in 1850.

Jesse Ketchum's home was a recognized landmark in early York, largely because of its size. It was a large frame building, painted white, and stood at the north west corner of Yonge and Adelaide. Henry Scadding described the home as a "dwelling in the American style with a square turret bearing a rail rising out of the ridge of the roof." The date of construction is unknown, but estimated to be around 1813 or 1814. John Ross Robertson claims Jesse Ketchum was one of the first people to bring sidewalks to York after he placed tanned bark outside of his home. The house was ultimately destroyed around 1838 or 1839 to cut up the land for building lots.

Ketchum Manufacturing, a company now located in Brockville, Ontario, which manufactures agricultural supplies, was founded by Jesse Ketchum's descendants in Ottawa, Ontario.

== Jesse Ketchum Public School, Toronto ==
Jesse Ketchum School was founded in the Town of York in 1832 in the Yorkville area, two years prior to the founding of the City of Toronto in 1834. The current Jesse Ketchum Junior and Senior Public School building at 61 Davenport Rd dates to 1914. A nearby park, Jesse Ketchum Park, is also named for him as both it and the school were made possible by donations by Ketchum. Famous former students include the Conacher family of sporting fame, Canadian sculptor Emanuel Hahn, actor Keanu Reeves (The Matrix), actor Zack Ward (A Christmas Story), and Academy Award winning director Domee Shi.

== Temperance Hall ==
Ketchum donated land to be used to build a Temperance Hall at 21 Temperance Street in 1846–1848.} It was the temporary home of the Toronto Normal School from 1847 to 1852. It was sold in 1969 and used by Stone Church until 1986.
