= Hugh Christopher Thomson =

Canadian politician

- Born: August 11, 1791; Kingston, Province of Quebec, British Empire
- Died: April 23, 1834
- Spouse(s): Elizabeth Spafford (m. 1813; died 1814) Elizabeth Ruttan (m. 1816)

Hugh Christopher Thomson (1791 – April 23, 1834) was a businessman, newspaper publisher and political figure in Upper Canada.

He was born in Kingston in Upper Canada in 1791, the son of Scottish immigrant Archibald Thomson who served with Joseph Brant during the American Revolution. The family moved from Kingston to Newark (Niagara-on-the-Lake) and then York (Toronto), where Thomson began work as a clerk in a general store. In 1810, he was transferred to Kingston. Although a member of the local militia, he did not serve in the War of 1812 due to poor health. In 1815, his employer returned to France and Thomson purchased the Kingston store. In 1819, he became editor and owner of the Upper Canada Herald, a weekly newspaper, which soon had the largest circulation of any newspaper in Upper Canada. He also printed pamphlets, books and reports, including The statutes of the province of Upper Canada in 1831.

In 1824, he was elected to the Legislative Assembly of Upper Canada as a moderate reformer; he was reelected in 1828 and 1830. He supported the freedom of the press, opposed the control of the clergy reserves by the Church of England and supported granting the same rights as British subjects to American-born settlers in Upper Canada. With the replacement of Sir Peregrine Maitland by Sir John Colborne as lieutenant governor, Thomson began to support the government's positions in the legislative assembly. He also withdrew his support from William Lyon Mackenzie as Mackenzie adopted more radical views. In 1831, he seconded James Hunter Samson's motion to expel Mackenzie from the house. He helped establish the provincial penitentiary at Kingston, later the Kingston Penitentiary.

He died in Kingston in 1834, after suffering several occurrences of bleeding in his lungs.

His second wife, Elizabeth Ruttan, who had taken over the operation of the newspaper in 1824 while Samson was in York, continued to run it until 1837, thus becoming the first woman to publish a newspaper in the province.

His brother Edward William Thomson was also a member of the legislative assembly of the province.
