= Benjamin Ewing =

Upper Canada politician

Benjamin Ewing (c. 1776 – after 1833) was a farmer, businessman and political figure in Upper Canada. He represented Northumberland in the Legislative Assembly of Upper Canada in 1825 and from 1828 to 1830.

He was born in Massachusetts (some sources say Vermont). Ewing lived in Haldimand Township. He married Eunice Doolittle. Ewing served as quartermaster in the county militia, later reaching the rank of captain. He was named coroner for the Newcastle District in 1824. He was declared elected in February 1825 after the election of James Lyons was declared invalid; Lyons appealed and was reinstated in March 1825. Ewing served as postmaster for Grafton from 1832 to 1833.

His sister Hannah married Eliakim Barnum, builder of the Barnum house in Grafton.
