= Rufus Henderson =

Upper Canada politician, physician and merchant

- Born: 1779
- Died: April 5, 1847 (aged 67–68); Augusta Township, Canada West
- Occupations: Medical doctor; Politician; Merchant
- Spouse: Ann Jones
- Relatives: Solomon Jones

Rufus C. Henderson (1779 – April 5, 1847) was a medical doctor, merchant and political figure in Upper Canada. He represented Grenville in the Legislative Assembly of Upper Canada from 1828 to 1830 as a Conservative.

Henderson married Ann Jones, the daughter of Solomon Jones. He served as a surgeon in the militia during the War of 1812. Henderson was a justice of the peace for the Johnstown District. He died in Augusta Township, Canada West.
