= John Alexander Wilkinson =

Upper Canada judge and politician

John Alexander Wilkinson (September 14, 1789 – September 17, 1862) was a judge and political figure in Upper Canada.

He was born in Dublin, Ireland in 1789. He came to Canada as a member of the British Army in 1814 and later settled at Sandwich (Windsor). He was named judge in the Surrogate Court for the Western District in 1836. He represented Essex in the 9th, 10th and 12th parliaments.
