= Grafton, Ontario =

Community in Ontario, Canada

Coordinates: 43.99109°N 78.02387°W

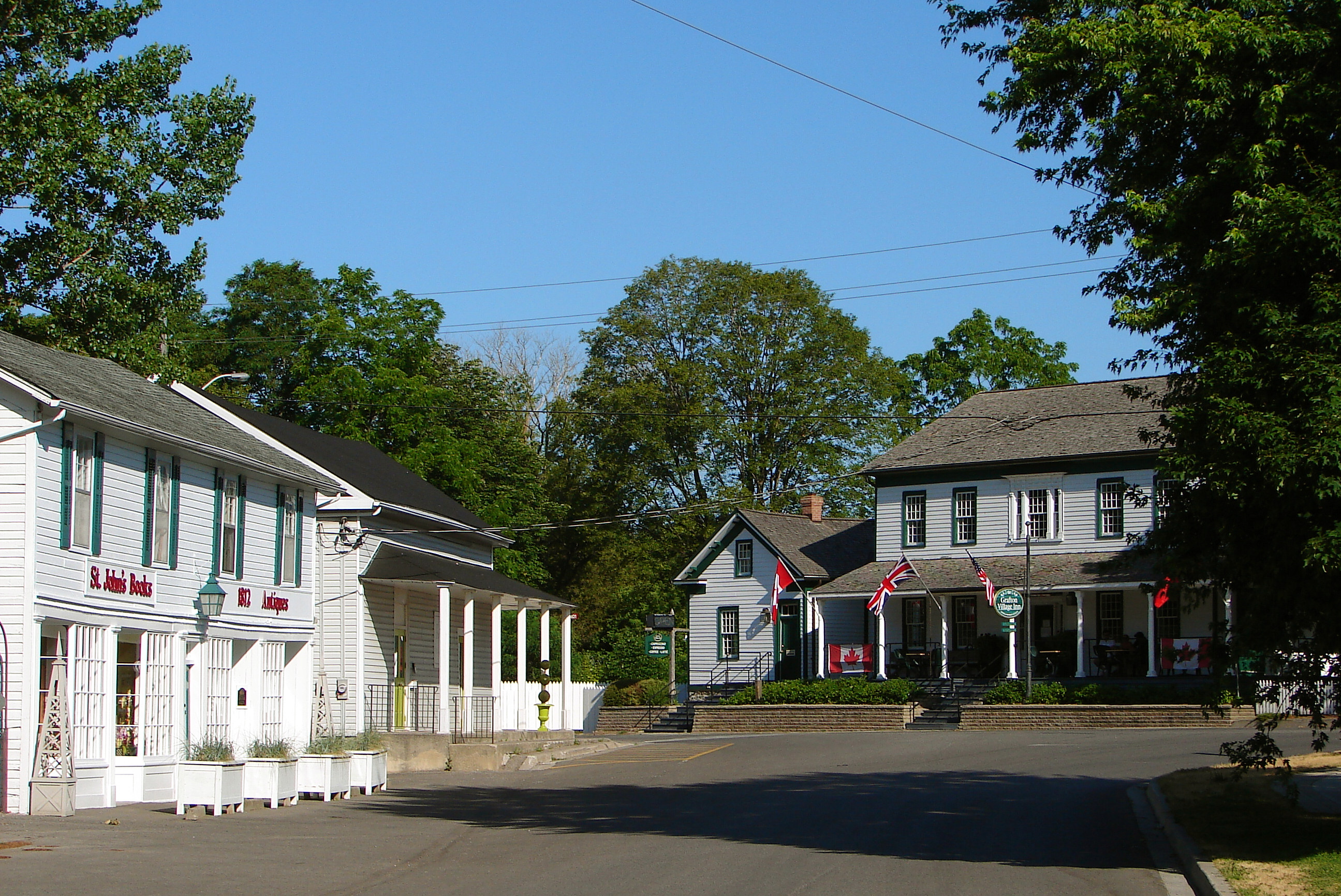
Grafton

Grafton is a community in the province of Ontario. It is an example of the type of hamlets that flourished in the 19th century.

== Location ==
Grafton is located in Northumberland County, in the township of Alnwick/Haldimand. It is 12 km east of Cobourg, Ontario, on the former Highway 2 (now County Road 2), with close access to Highway 401. The hamlet is near the geographically significant Oak Ridges Moraine at Rice Lake.

== Name ==
Grafton was originally called Grover's Tavern until March 1832, when it was renamed in honour of the hometown of John Grover: Grafton, Massachusetts. The original Grover's Tavern, the namesake building of the hamlet, still stands today as the Grafton Village Inn, a restaurant and bed and breakfast in the heart of the hamlet. It was also referred to early in its history as Haldimand, which is the name of the township it is located in.

== History ==
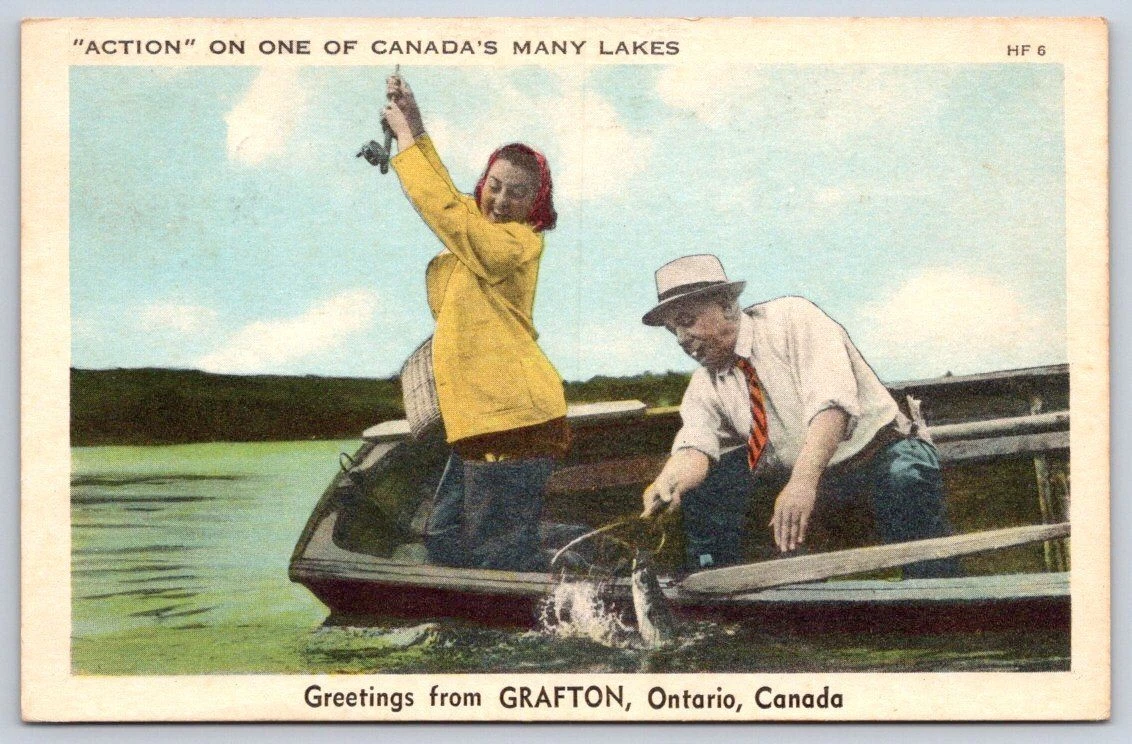
A period postcard promoting recreation in Grafton, Ontario

Benjamin Ewing was one of the first settlers in Grafton, having settled by 1798 in a property located on what is currently Benlock Road. Another early settler (from 1807 or 1808) was his friend Eliakim Barnum, the original owner of the Barnum House on Hwy #2. Barnum House is now a museum in Grafton, and it is thought that Eliakim Barnum bought the house from another family who owned it before. Barnum married Ben's sister Hannah Ewing Blanchard just after 1812.

Grafton had a bustling port for many years, shipping grain, barley, and other commodities to communities along the Great Lakes. In addition, the hamlet included a Sons of Temperance group, an order of Freemasons, and numerous other social leagues. Bolstered by satellite communities such as Centreton, Castleton, Wicklow, and Vernonville, Grafton was a productive hamlet that supported itself through both agriculture and services.

By the late 1870s, the hamlet could boast of having a doctor, several taverns and inns, a cheese factory, a blacksmith, a public scale, and a train station on the GTR line. Milk and dairy products were shipped daily to both Kingston and Toronto, and regular passenger service was also available. Grafton was successful enough at this time to earn a weekly column in the Cobourg daily newspaper, "Latest Items from Grafton," which ran from 1875 to 1877. The column included news of the surrounding communities and hamlets and detailed various social, political, and economic on-goings in the area, such as picnics, local crime, sporting contests, and harvest reports.

The town of Grafton currently has a small population of under one thousand. Many early settlers continue to have descendants living in the area; notable family names include McKenzie, Calnan, McBride, Johnston, Inglis, Harnden, Harrison, Raymond, Owens, Davis, Bryden, Broomfield, Chamberlain, Mian, Lackey, Lawless, and Bryson. Many of the early settler families have routes, roads, and landmarks named for them in the hamlets and surrounding areas, such as Broomfield Road, which runs roughly between Vernonville and Centreton.

== Economy ==
Businesses and community buildings include the Haldimand Memorial Arena, the Grafton Community Centre & Library, Grafton Public School, St. Marys Elementary School, Grafton Variety, Prentice's Garage, The Durham Farmers Co-op farm and feed store, the Bullpen, 1812 Antiques, Lantern Books, the Grafton Village Inn, and the Lawless Art Gallery. Grafton is currently home to such notable places as St. Annes Inn & Spa, the former home of Bob Homme ("The Friendly Giant"), the Barnum House museum, and a defunct canning factory, Grafton Arena (since converted into a private residence).

Grafton is supported by these smaller businesses and tourism. Agriculture is still prevalent in the surrounding area, predominantly with crops such as corn, soybeans, and wheat, and livestock including beef, dairy, and poultry. The processing and shipping elements of the agricultural business have moved on beyond Grafton. There continues to be development and residential growth in and around the hamlet as the area grows in size.

Grafton is the current site in which the Kirkland Signature brand of Costco sources its spring water (sold in stores across the province). It is also the source for water for the RealCanadian water bottle company.

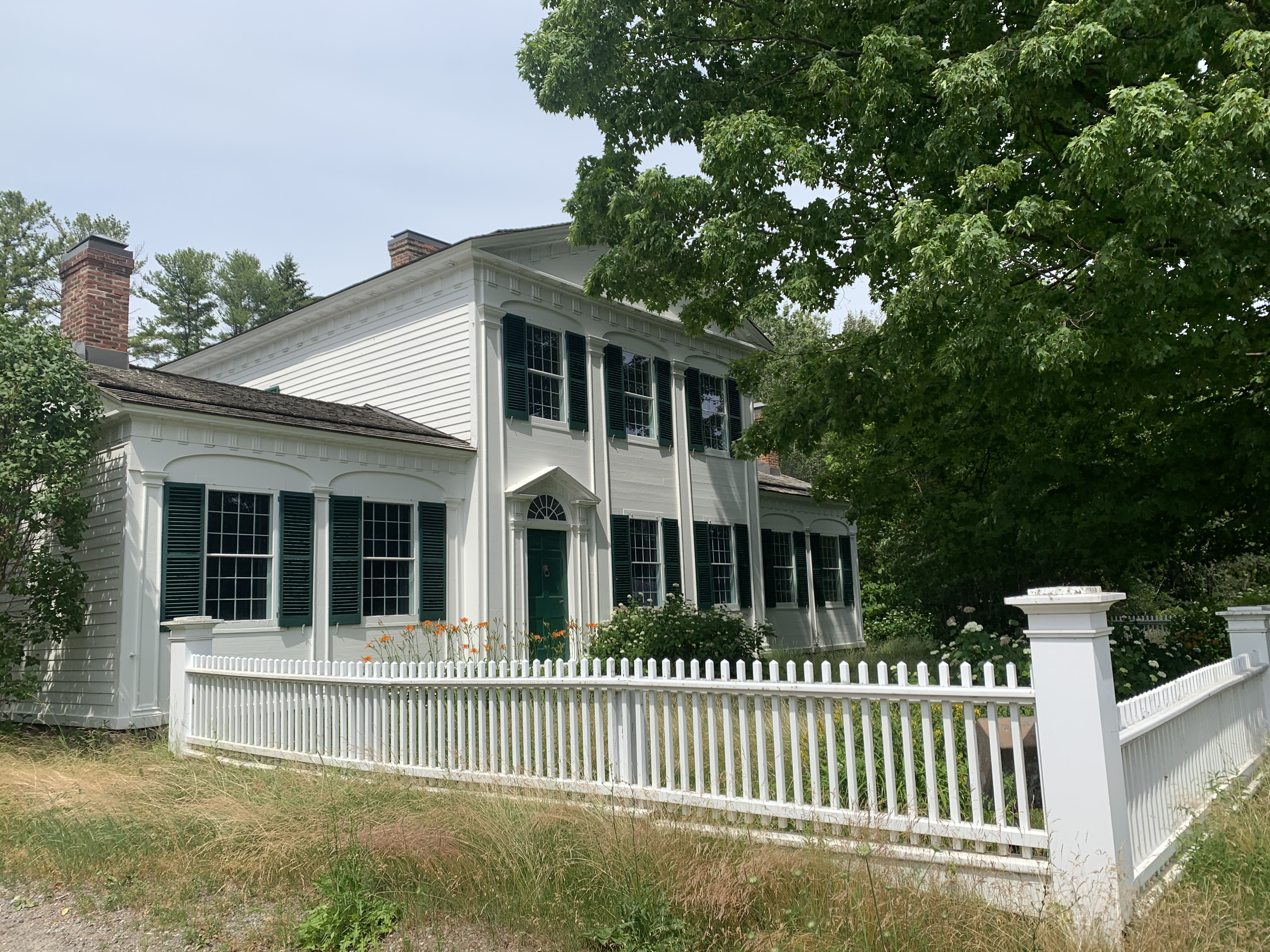
Barnum House, 1819

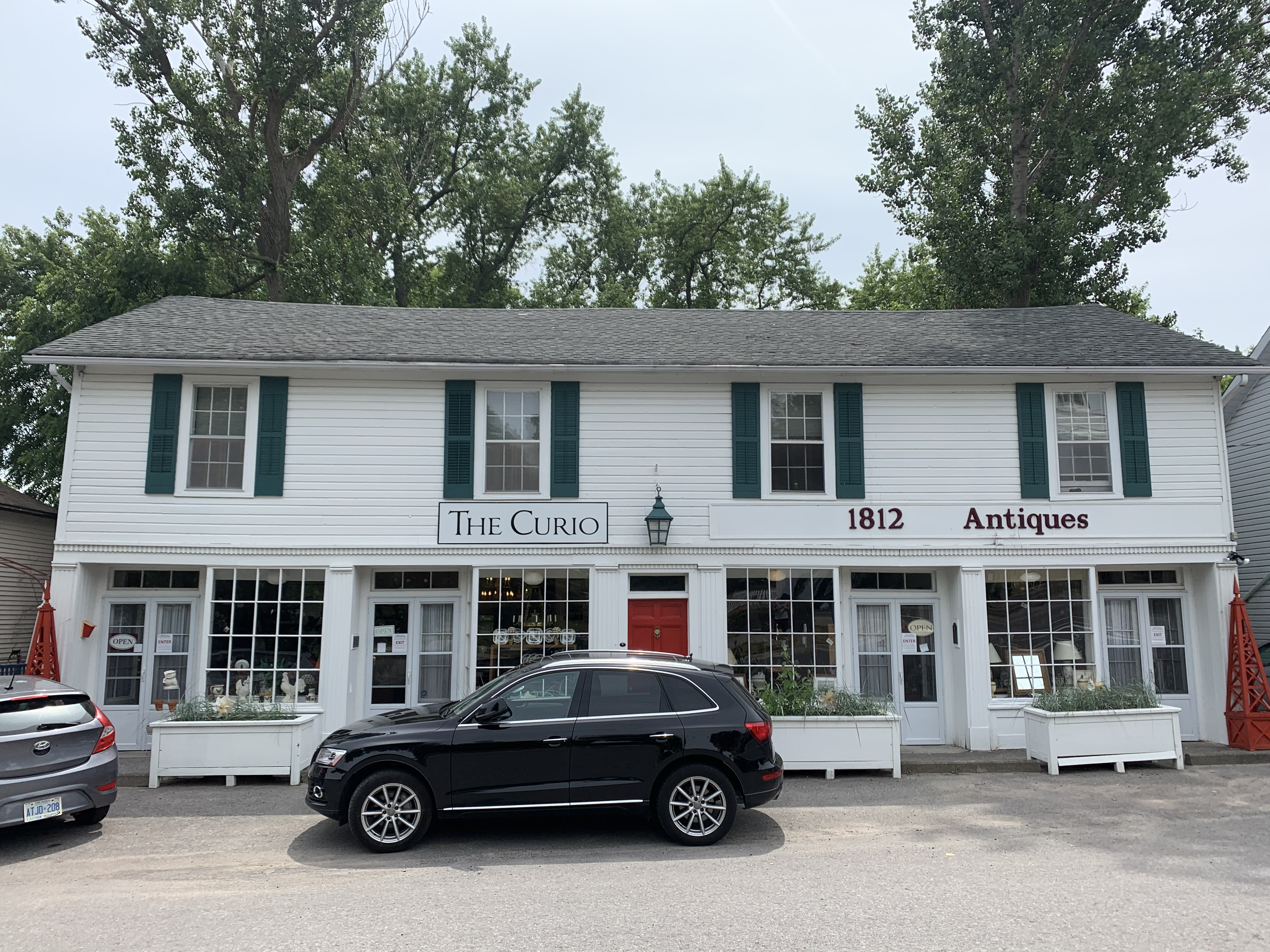
Commercial Building, 1820

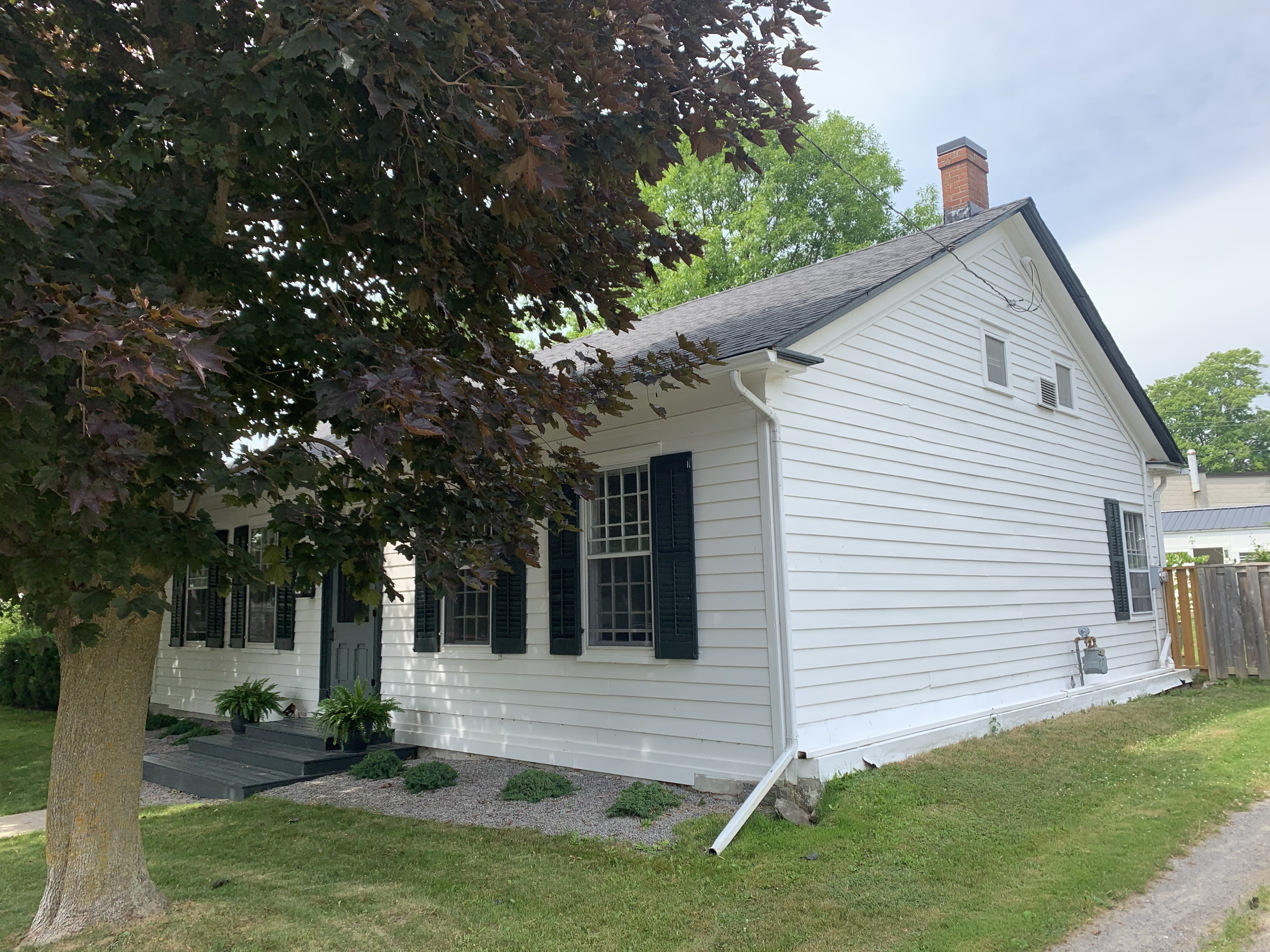
Grafton, Lawless Cottage, c. 1820, LK

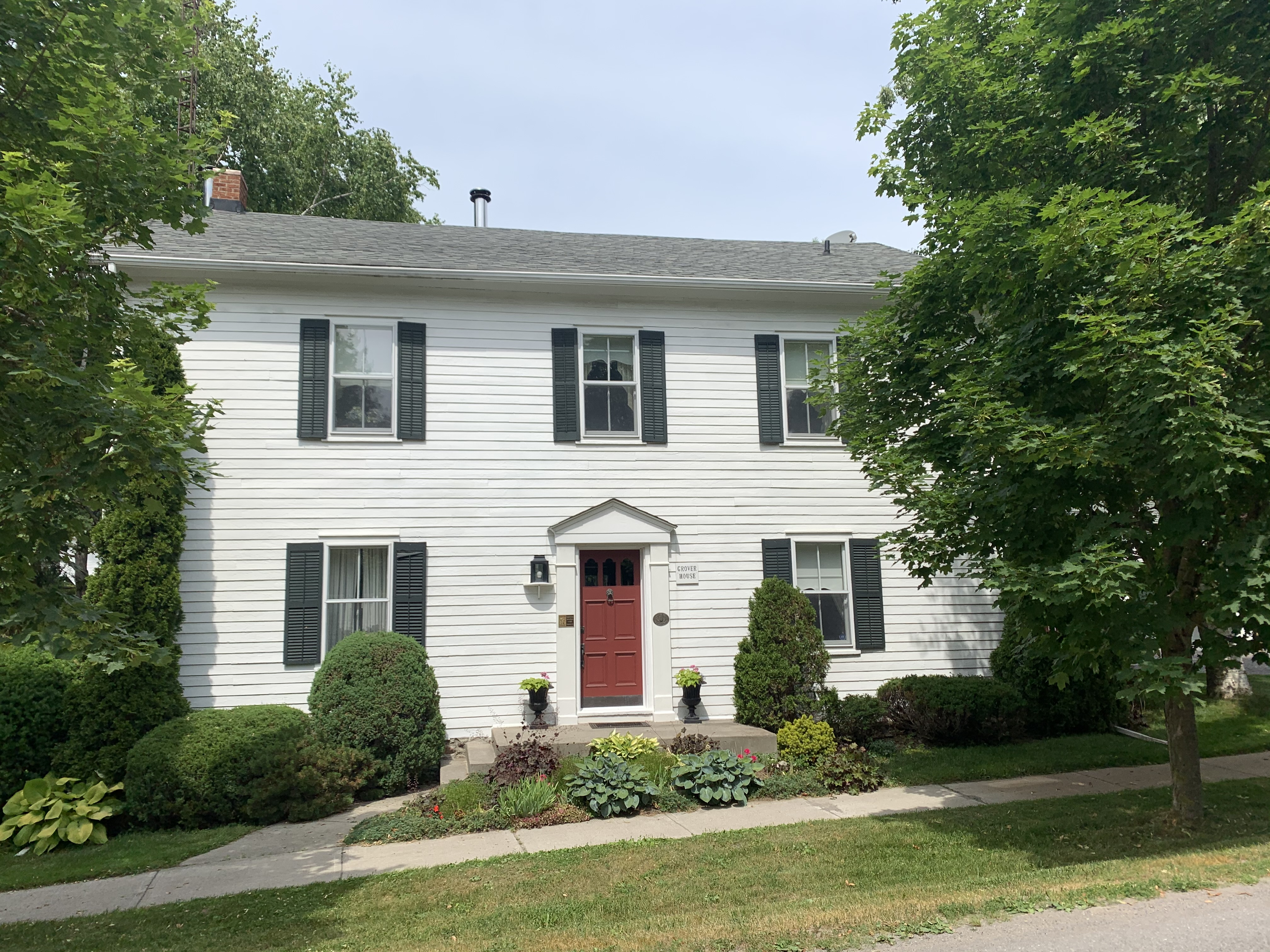
Grover House, c. 1822

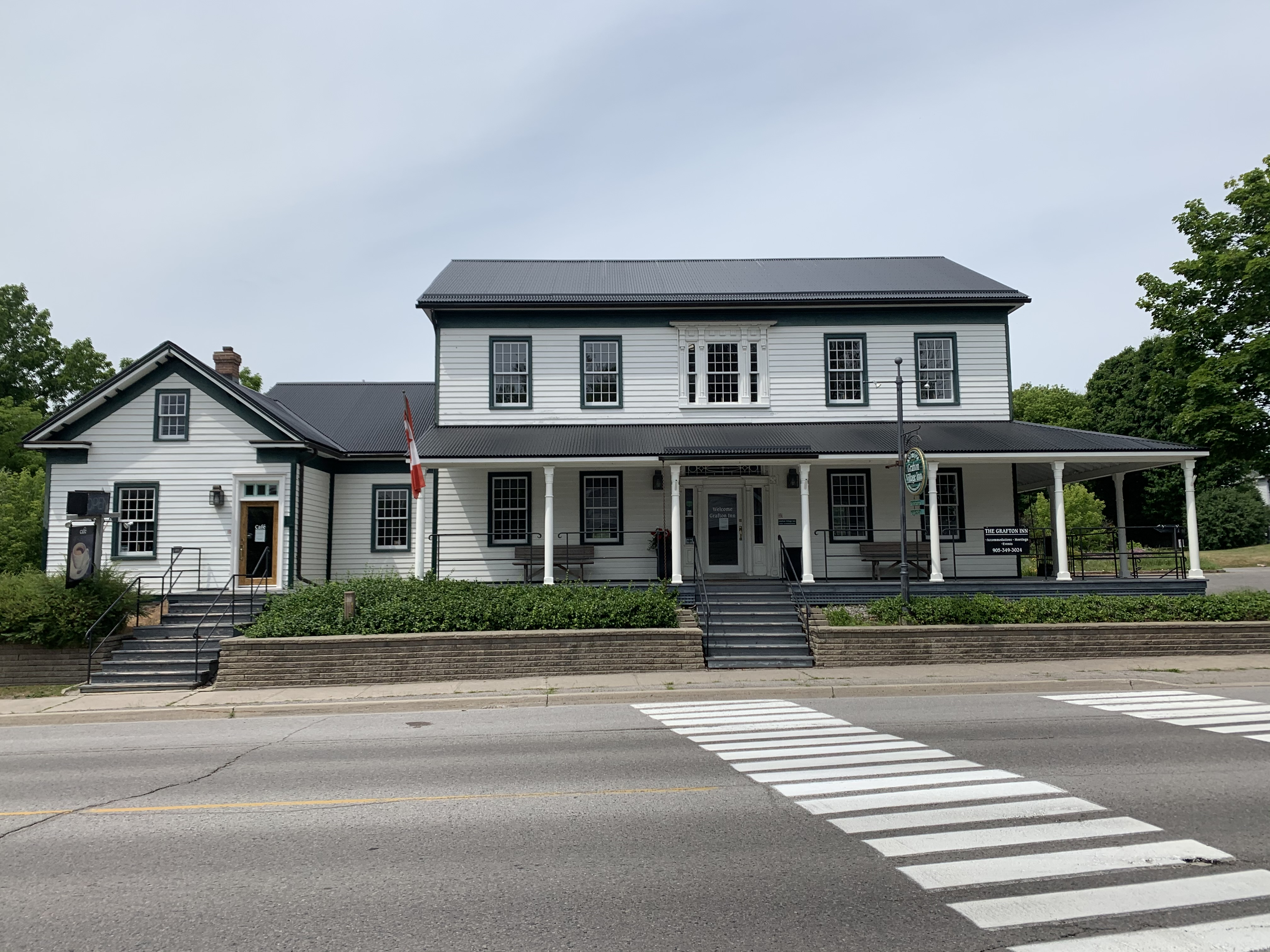
The Grafton Village Inn, c. 1833

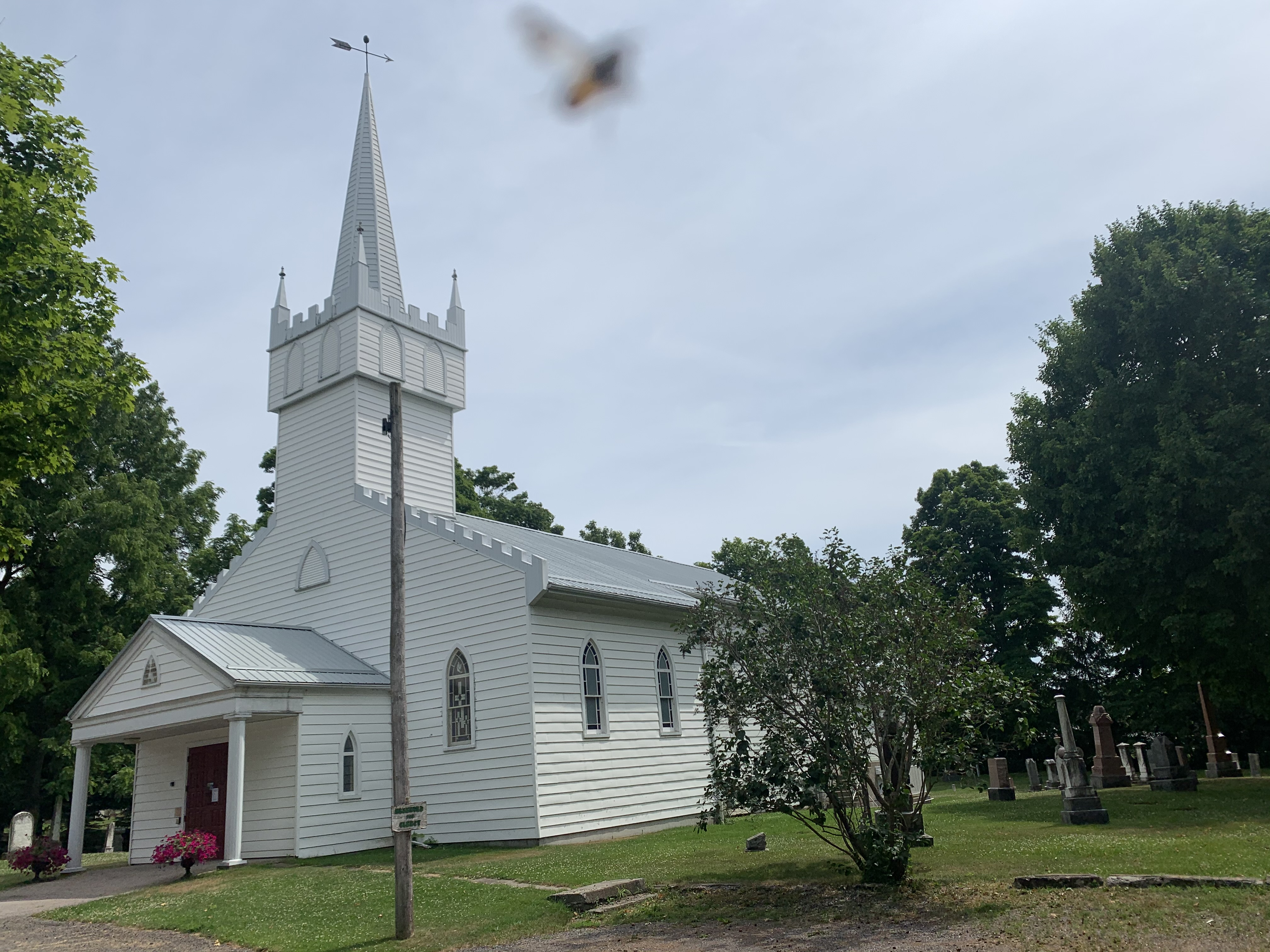
St. Andrew's United Church (Formerly Presbyterian), 1844
