= Edward William Thomson (writer) =

Canadian journalist and writer

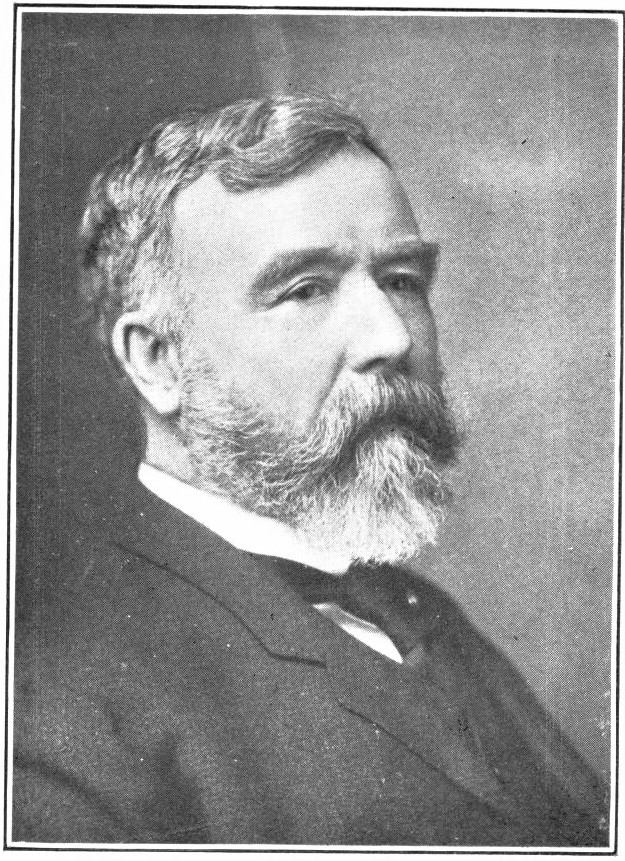
- Born: February 12, 1849; Peel County, Canada West
- Died: March 5, 1924; Boston, Massachusetts
- Occupations: Writer, Poet, Editor
- Writing career
- Notable works: The Many-Mansioned House and Other Poems

Edward William Thomson (February 12, 1849–March 5, 1924) was a Canadian journalist and writer. He wrote a book of short stories and a book of poetry.

== Life ==
Thomson was born in Peel County, Canada West, the grandson of Edward William Thomson, a member of the York militia who was a member of the Legislative Assembly of Upper Canada.

When Thompson was 14, he was sent to Philadelphia to work in a mercantile office; he enlisted in the Union Army in October 1864 (at 15), and saw action during the American Civil War as a trooper in the 3rd Pennsylvania Cavalry.

Thomson returned to Canada when discharged in August 1865. He saw combat again the next year, at the Battle of Ridgeway when he and others of the Queen's Own repelled one of the Fenian Raids.

Thomson took up civil engineering in 1867, and worked as a Land Surveyor from 1872 to 1878. In 1878, at the invitation of publisher George Brown, he became an editorial writer for The Toronto Globe. In 1891 he joined the staff of The Youth's Companion, and worked there for the next 11 years. Later he lived in Ottawa and served as correspondent for several newspapers. In 1909 an article he had written for the Boston Transcript, extolling the provincial government of Alberta Premier Alexander Cameron Rutherford, was reprinted as a pamphlet under the title How Alberta is Governed - A Utopian State. A Province that is Actually Governed by its People.

He wrote a book of short stories, Old Man Savarin and Other Stories (1895), and one of poetry, The Many-Mansioned House and Other Poems (1909).

== Publications ==
- Old Man Savarin and Other Stories (1895)
- Walter Gibbs, the Young Boss and Other Stories: A Book for Boys (1896) – contains stories previously published in The Youth's Companion
- When Lincoln Died: And Other Poems (1909)
- Red-Headed Windego
- Verbitzsky's Stratagem
- Mc Grath's Bad Night
- Great Godfrey's Lament
