= Robert Lyon (duellist) =

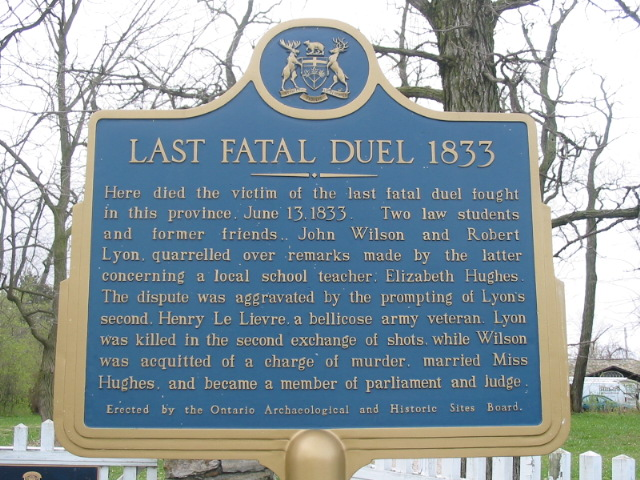
A commemorative plaque

Robert Lyon (30 December 1812 – 13 June 1833), the son of a British officer, was said to be the last fatality in Canadian duelling history, shot by a fellow law student, John Wilson in 1833.

Lyon was born in Inverurie, Scotland in 1812 and came to Canada along with his family in 1829.

Initiated by the 20-year-old Lyon at the urging of his eventual "second" Henri Lelievre, the duel was held over the love of local schoolteacher Elizabeth Hughes, and occurred above the Tay Canal outside Perth, Ontario. After Lyon's death, Wilson and his second Samuel Robertson were both charged with murder in Brockville, Ontario, though acquitted. Two years later he married Elizabeth Hughes and they had three children together; he went on to become a judge and Member of Parliament before dying in 1869.

The lawyer Wilson had studied under, James Boulton, left Perth after locals began claiming that he had goaded his understudy to push Lyon into the duel, since he was the understudy of Boulton's rival Thomas Radenhurst. Lyon's second, Henri Lelievre, fled the country fearing that some also considered him responsible for the duel, since he had encouraged a second round after both had missed their first shot. He is believed to have died in Australia.

In 1996, Susan Code wrote A Matter of Honour ISBN 1-896182-27-5, and a year later two students of Sheridan College oversaw the production of an independent film by the same name, telling the story of the duel. On his 1973 album Stompin' Tom and the Hockey Song, Stompin' Tom Connors released the song "The Last Fatal Duel," written by Freddy Dixon, detailing the battle (though accidentally referring to Lyon as William, not Robert).

Lyon's tombstone in the Anglican cemetery in Perth reads

Friendship Offering,
Dedicated
To the Memory of
ROBERT LYON,
(Student-at-law)
He fell
in mortal combat
13 June 1833
in the 20th year
of his Age
Requieseat in Pace.

Other sources, however, agree that it was the last duel in Ontario which was then known as Upper Canada, but not the last fatal duel in what is now the country of Canada. For example, Radio Canada International and the Montreal Gazette refer to documents that state that the last fatal duel occurred on 22 May 1838, in Quebec, then known as Lower Canada, between British officer Major Henry Warde and lawyer Robert Sweeney; Warde was wounded and subsequently died.
