= Mackenzie House =

Municipal Museum in Toronto, Ontario, Canada

Coordinates: 43.655665°N 79.378291°W

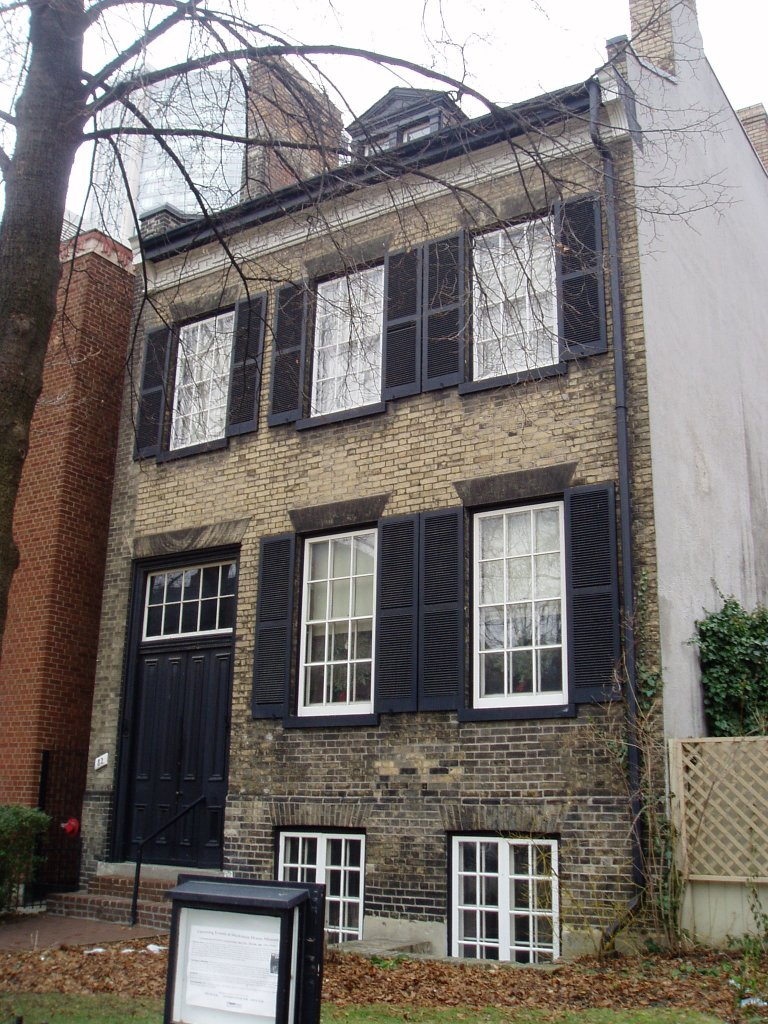
- Established: 1936; 90 years ago
- Location: 82 Bond Street, Toronto, Ontario Canada
- Type: Municipal Museum
- Public transit access: 505
- Website: toronto.ca

Mackenzie House is a historic building and museum located at 82 Bond Street within the Garden District in downtown Toronto, Ontario, Canada. It was the final home of William Lyon Mackenzie, the first mayor of Toronto and a key figure in Canadian political history, particularly known for leading the 1837 Upper Canada Rebellion. Today, the house is preserved as a museum operated by the City of Toronto’s Museum and Heritage Services, offering visitors insight into Victorian-era urban life and the legacy of Mackenzie and his family.

== History ==
The three-storey brick townhouse was purchased in 1858 by Mackenzie’s friends and political supporters to provide him with a permanent residence in his later years. At the time, Mackenzie was in poor health and struggling financially after years of political and journalistic activism. He lived in the house until his death in 1861.

In 1864, the property was seized by the sheriff of Toronto due to outstanding debts. However, the home was acquired shortly afterward by John Taylor, a prominent local businessman, who allowed Mackenzie’s widow, Isabel Baxter Mackenzie, and family to continue living in the house rent-free. In 1868, Isabel was able to repurchase the home using funds granted by the Ontario Legislature to cover expenses related to Mackenzie’s earlier political mission to London in the 1830s.

The Mackenzie family retained ownership of the property for several decades. While many of the adjacent Georgian-style row houses on Bond Street were demolished in 1936, Mackenzie House was preserved, largely due to its association with Canadian history. Its survival is attributed in part to public interest and the influence of William Lyon Mackenzie King, Mackenzie’s grandson and Canada’s longest-serving Prime Minister, who was in office during this period.

Mackenzie House was converted into a museum in the 1960s following advocacy by local historians and preservationists. The building has since undergone several restorations to maintain its historical integrity and adapt it for public education. Furnished with period-appropriate artefacts and décor, the house aims to reflect the appearance and domestic atmosphere of an upper-middle-class Toronto home in the 1860s.

The house flooded in 2021. The city is currently fundraising to refurbish and re-equip the building. It remains open for guided tours.

== Grounds ==
Mackenzie House was built in the Georgian architectural style, characterised by its symmetrical façade, brickwork, and restrained elegance. Though the original row of houses no longer exists, the single remaining structure stands as a rare example of Toronto’s 19th-century residential architecture.

Adjacent to the building is a small courtyard, where the side panels of the former Memorial Arch from Niagara Falls are displayed. The arch was originally constructed in the 1930s at the foot of the Honeymoon Bridge, which connected Canada and the United States. After the bridge and arch were dismantled in the 1960s, the panels were preserved and later installed on the grounds of Mackenzie House in 1974 as a historical monument.

The building was designed in the Georgian architecture style, and is presently operated as a municipally run historic house museum about 1860s Urban Victorian life.

On the grounds are the side panels of the Memorial Arch that once stood at the foot of the Honeymoon Bridge in Niagara Falls, Ontario. Built in 1930s, the arch was demolished in 1960s and the panels stored until it was moved to Toronto in 1974. It is installed in an area next to the historic home.

== Museum ==
Mackenzie House is one of the ten Historic Sites historic museums owned and operated by the City of Toronto. It focuses on the life and times of the Mackenzie family and Mackenzie's role as a newspaper editor and politician. The museum also depicts life in Toronto of the 1860s to the 1890s, including programs focused on Black Canadians and Mary Ann Shadd.

The interior of Mackenzie House is restored to reflect the urban Victorian lifestyle of the 1860s and is interpreted through the lens of the Mackenzie family. The museum’s exhibits focus on William Lyon Mackenzie’s political activism, his role as the founder of the Colonial Advocate newspaper, and his involvement in early democratic reform in Upper Canada.

Programs include school tours, family-friendly events, and seasonal programming that highlight Toronto’s diverse and evolving historical narrative. The site also features a historical print shop with an operational 19th-century printing press, showcasing the tools of the trade that Mackenzie would have used as a publisher.

Mackenzie House is part of the City of Toronto's Historic Sites network, which includes ten museums across the city. It is affiliated with the Canadian Museums Association (CMA), the Canadian Heritage Information Network (CHIN), and the Virtual Museum of Canada.

The museum formed a collaboration in 2025 with Dundee Culture, a news and media site promoting Dundee in Scotland, Mackenzie’s birthplace.

== Gallery ==
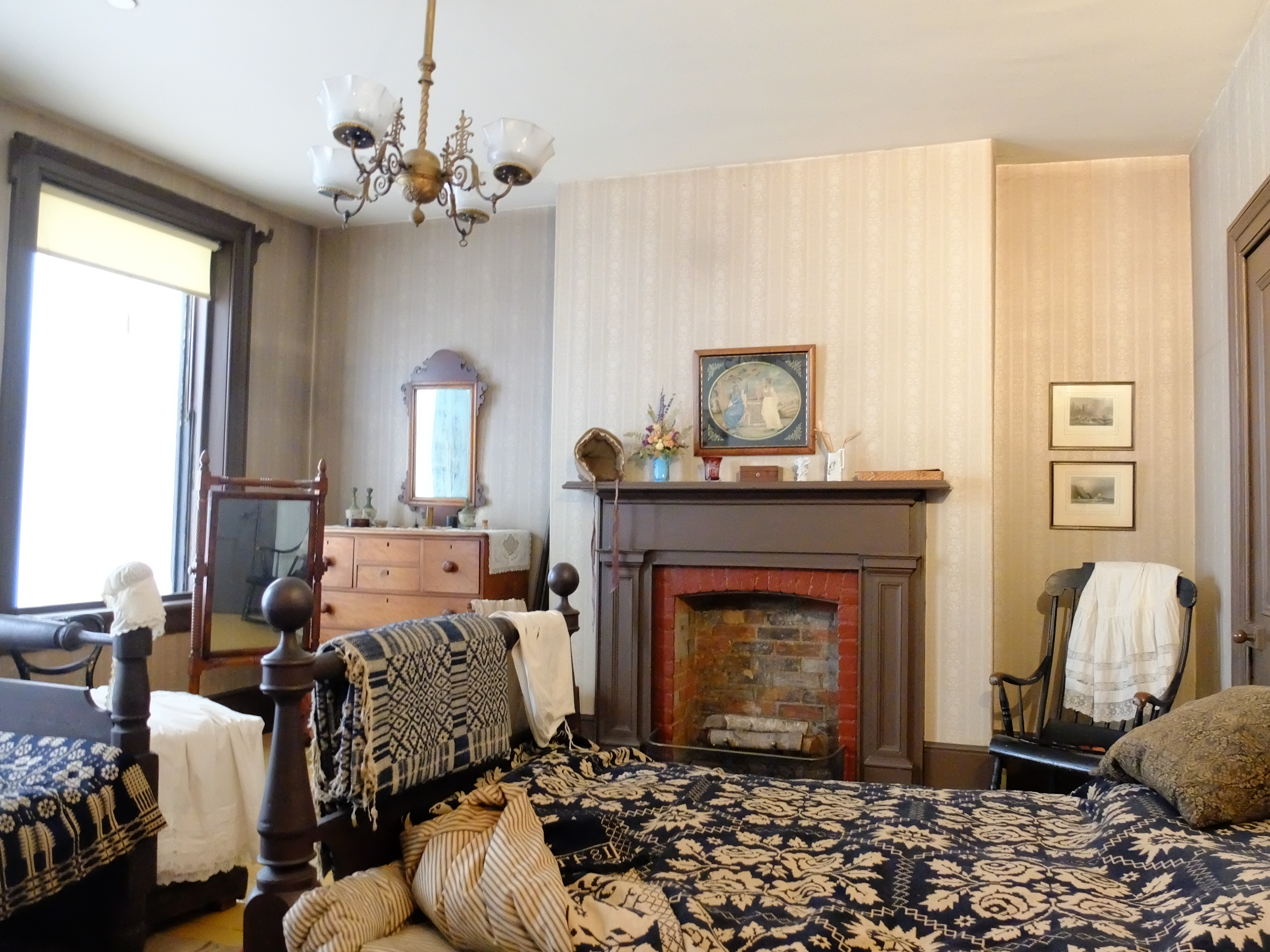
Interior of Mackenzie House depicts life in Toronto during the late 19th century

== See also ==
- List of museums in Toronto

== See also ==
- List of oldest buildings and structures in Toronto
