= Thomas Mabon Radenhurst =

Canadian politician and lawyer

Thomas Mabon Radenhurst QC
- Born: April 6, 1803; Fort St. Johns, Saint-Jean-sur-Richelieu, Lower Canada
- Died: August 7, 1854 (aged 51); Perth
- Occupation(s): lawyer, political figure
- Known for: 10th Parliament of Upper Canada representing Carleton County, Ontario

Thomas Mabon Radenhurst, QC (April 6, 1803 – August 7, 1854) was a lawyer and political figure in Upper Canada.

He was born at Fort St. Johns (Saint-Jean-sur-Richelieu) in Lower Canada in 1803. His father, an immigrant from England, died in 1805. He was educated at John Strachan's school in York (Toronto) and then studied law with his cousin, George Ridout in York. He was called to the bar in 1824 and then moved to Perth, the judicial seat of the Bathurst District. In 1828, he was elected to the 10th Parliament of Upper Canada representing Carleton County.

In 1830, he fought a duel with another Perth lawyer, James Boulton; neither party was seriously injured. In 1833, Robert Lyon, Radenhurst's student, and John Wilson, Boulton's student, fought the last fatal duel in Canada; Lyon died on June 13, 1833.

He was appointed district court judge in 1841 but declined the appointment because he felt that it did not provide adequate compensation. He served as crown prosecutor for the Eastern and Midland Districts. In 1850, he became a Queen's Counsel.

He died at Perth in 1854.
