= George Longley =

Canadian politician

George Longley (April 1787 – 1842) was an English-born businessman, farmer and political figure in Upper Canada. He represented Grenville in the Legislative Assembly of Upper Canada from 1829 to 1830 as a Reformer. His surname also appears as Langley.

He was the son of William Langley and Sarah Scott and came to Lower Canada around 1812. On his arrival, Longley entered the timber trade. In 1815, he was appointed by the province a master culler and measurer of timber. Around 1823, he formed his own company in partnership with Joseph Dyke. The partners exported timber and were also shipbuilders. He purchased farm land in Augusta Township in 1822. In 1824, Longley married Ruth Wells. He settled in Maitland in 1826 and retired from his partnership with Dyke later that year. Longley also became the primary owner of a grist mill, producing flour for export. He opened a shop in Maitland and also served as postmaster. He raised livestock on his farm. He became the first president of the Grenville County Agricultural Society. Longley was unsuccessful when he ran for reelection in 1830. That same year, he was named a commissioner for the canals on the Saint Lawrence River. Longley also served as a justice of the peace. He died at sea while travelling from Quebec to London and was buried in the parish of Milton-next-Gravesend in August 1842.
