= James Lyons (Upper Canada politician) =

Upper Canada politician and merchant

James Lyons was a merchant and political figure in Upper Canada. He represented Northumberland in the Legislative Assembly of Upper Canada from 1824 to 1834 as a Reformer.

Lyons lived in the Niagara District, then Cramahe Township and later Murray Township. He served in the militia during the War of 1812, later reaching the rank of captain. Lyons was a justice of the peace for the Newcastle District. He was elected in 1824, but his election was overturned in January of the following year and Benjamin Ewing was declared elected. After another appeal, Lyons was declared elected a month later. Both Ewing and Lyons were elected in 1828; Lyons was reelected in 1830.

Lyons was the son-in-law of James Richardson.
