= Thomas Hornor =

Canadian politician

Thomas Hornor (March 17, 1767 – August 4, 1834) was a farmer and political figure in Upper Canada.

He was born in Mansfield Township, Burlington County, New Jersey in 1767 and studied at the College of New Jersey. In 1794, he led a group of settlers to Watsons Township, later Blenheim Township, and built a sawmill there the following year. The settlement that Hornor established was known as Princeton. Originally, a Quaker, he became a freemason and was appointed a captain in the local militia. In 1800, he became a justice of the peace in the London District and county registrar. He served in the local militia during the War of 1812, eventually becoming colonel in 1822.

In 1820, he was elected to the Legislative Assembly of Upper Canada for Oxford; he was reelected in 1824 and 1828. He supported the repeal of the Sedition Act and the right of Barnabas Bidwell to sit in the legislative assembly.

He died in Burford Township in 1834 during a cholera epidemic. He had been elected again to the legislative assembly after the death of Charles Ingersoll in 1832 and died while still in office.
