= Ambrose Blacklock =

Upper Canada politician

Ambrose Blacklock (May 17, 1784 – October 5, 1866) was a Scottish-born farmer, medical doctor and political figure in Upper Canada.

He was born in Dumfries and studied medicine in Scotland. In 1807, he was commissioned as a surgeon in the Royal Navy. He served on lakes Ontario and Champlain during the War of 1812. Blacklock lived in Cornwall and later St. Andrews. He married Catherine Macdonell. Blacklock served as a justice of the peace and coroner for the Eastern District.

He represented Stormont in the Legislative Assembly of Upper Canada from 1828 to 1830 as a Reformer.

He died at St. Andrews at the age of 82.
