= Solomon Jones =

Canadian politician

Solomon Jones (c. 1756 – September 21, 1822) was a medical doctor, judge and political figure in Upper Canada.

He was born in New Jersey, America around 1756 and the family later moved to New York state. He studied medicine in Albany; at the start of the American Revolution, he became a surgeon's mate in Edward Jessup's Loyal Rangers. After the defeat of General John Burgoyne at Saratoga, the family fled north. Jones spent much of the following years treating wounded loyalist soldiers. After the war, he settled in Augusta Township. In 1788, he became surgeon for the local militia and, in 1794, was clerk for the land board in the Eastern District. In 1796, Jones was elected to the 2nd Parliament of Upper Canada for Leeds and Frontenac and was also appointed justice of the peace in the district. In 1800, he became a judge in the court for the Johnstown District.

When serving as a judge he had his own son appointed as his court clerk.

His sons were educated at the school in Cornwall run by John Strachan and he helped Strachan establish the Church of England in the area. During the War of 1812, he served as surgeon for the garrison at Prescott. In 1819, he was appointed to the district land board.

After a period of ill health, he died at his home near the current site of Maitland in 1822.

His former home, Homewood, one of the oldest houses in Ontario, was opened as a museum in 2005. It was designated a National Historic Site of Canada in 1982.

Jones was a slave-owner, having purchased a female slave from his brother Daniel.
