= Edward William Thomson =

Canadian politician

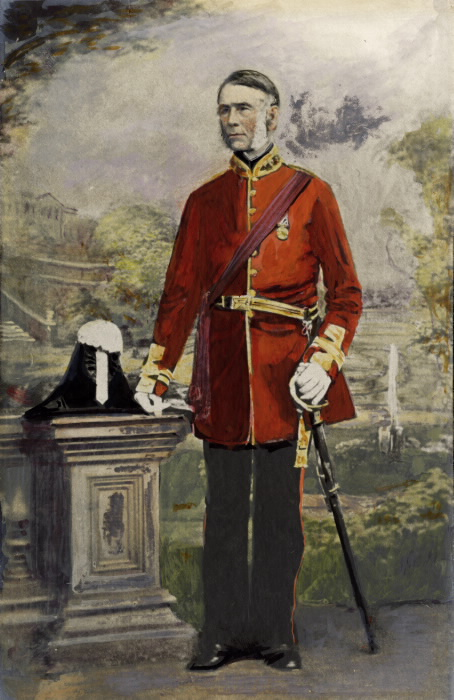
- Born: January 1794; Kingston, Upper Canada, British Empire
- Died: April 20, 1865 (aged 71); York Township, Canada West
- Occupations: Farmer; Contractor; Parliamentarian
- Title: Colonel

Edward William Thomson (January 1794 – April 20, 1865) was a farmer and political figure in Upper Canada.

== Biography ==
He was born in Kingston in 1794 and settled in Scarborough Township in 1808. He served with the York Militia during the War of 1812 and the Rebellions of 1837, eventually commanding the 5th militia district in Canada West. He was involved in building locks on the Rideau Canal and worked as a contractor on the Welland Canal in the 1840s. In 1833, he was appointed justice of the peace in the Home District. In 1836, he was elected to the 13th Parliament of Upper Canada in the 2nd riding of York. He was the first president of the provincial Agricultural Association and the York County Agricultural Society.

He represented Canada at the London at the exhibitions of 1851 and 1862.

He died in York Township in 1865.

His older brother Hugh Christopher Thomson was also a member of the legislative assembly.

His grandson, Edward William Thomson, was a journalist and writer.

His niece, Letitia Moyle, married John Malcolm.
