= James Hunter Samson =

Canadian politician (1800–1836)

James Hunter Samson (c. 1800–March 26, 1836) was a lawyer and political figure in Upper Canada.

He was born in Ireland around 1800 and came to Canada with his father's unit of the British Army in 1813. He studied at York (modern Toronto), where he became close friends with Robert Baldwin. He articled in law with Christopher Alexander Hagerman, was called to the bar in 1823 and set up a practice in Belleville. In 1828, he married Alicia Fenton Russell, the niece of Sir John Harvey. In the same year, he was elected to the Legislative Assembly of Upper Canada for Hastings; he was reelected in 1830 and 1834. He was one of the most conservative members of the assembly. After William Lyon Mackenzie criticized Samson in his Colonial Advocate, he pressed libel charges against Mackenzie in 1831 and introduced a motion to expel Mackenzie from the assembly. He helped build the first hospital in Belleville in 1832 and served on the village council. He also served as lieutenant colonel in the local militia.

With the death of his father in 1832 and his increasing alienation from Baldwin due to their conflicting political views, Samson began drinking heavily and he died in Belleville in 1836.
