= Barnum House =

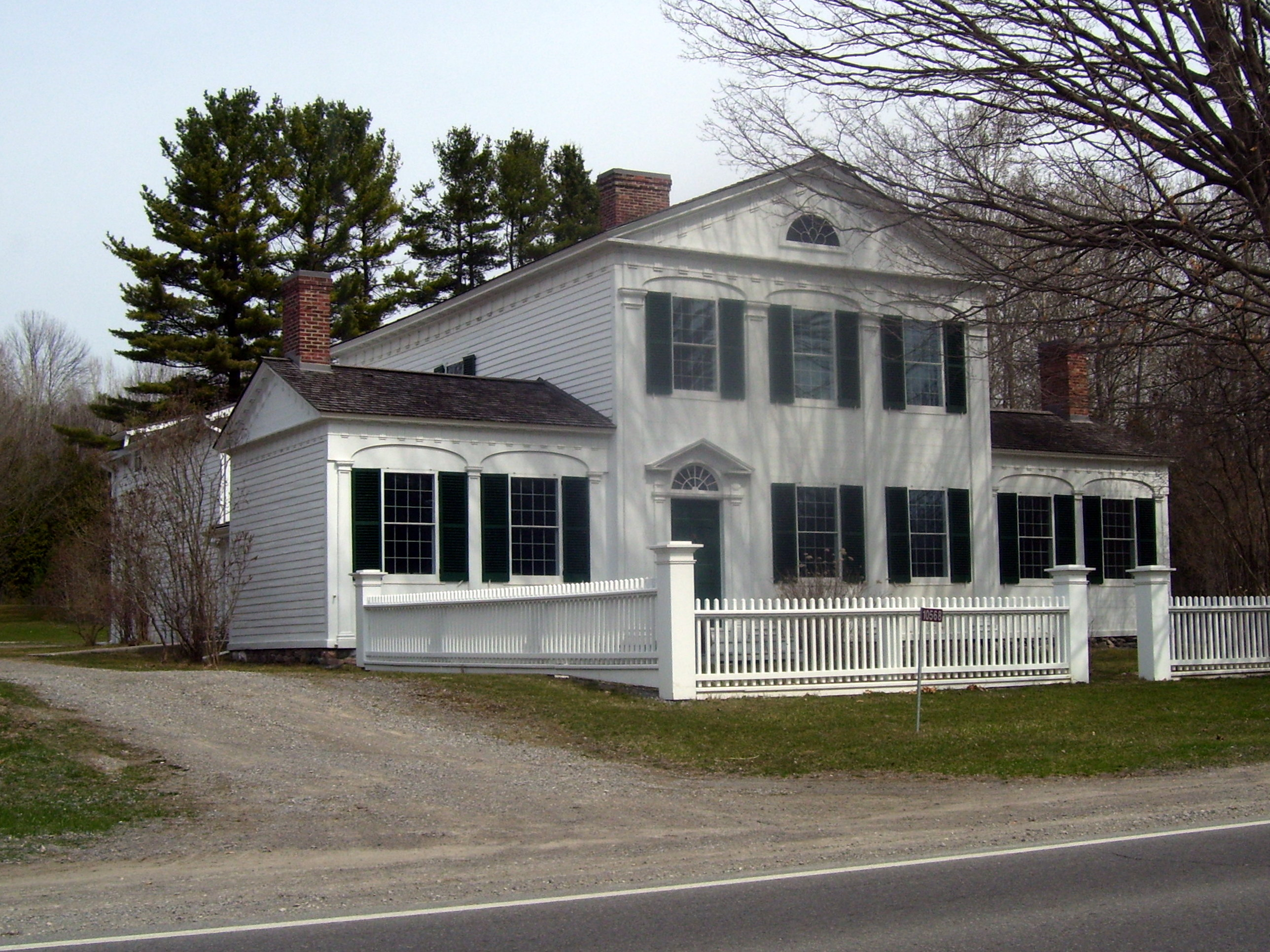
- Established: 1958
- Location: Grafton, Ontario, Canada
- Coordinates: 43°59′27″N 78°02′37″W
- Type: Historic house museum
- Website: Official web site

National Historic Site of Canada
- Designated: 1959

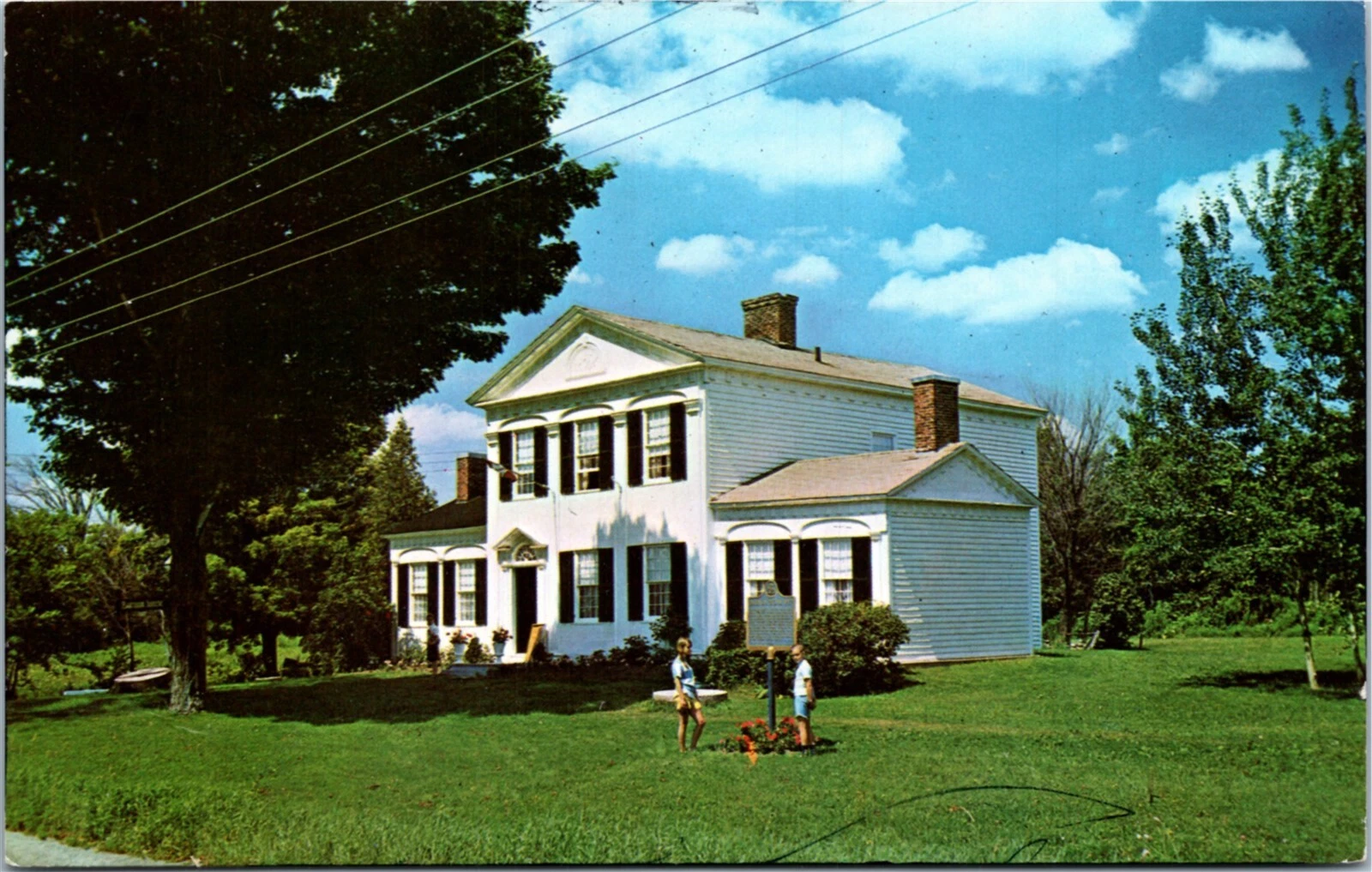
A Barnum House postcard

The Barnum House was built between 1817 and 1819 by Eliakim Barnum, a United Empire Loyalist originally from Vermont. The house, which stands just outside Grafton, Ontario, in Alnwick/Haldimand Township, is the earliest example of Neoclassical architecture in Canada. Barnum House was the first house museum to open in Ontario, restored and operated by the Architectural Conservancy of Ontario in 1940. It is currently owned and operated by the Ontario Heritage Trust.

Barnum House was designated a National Historic Site of Canada in 1959.

== History ==
The site of the Barnum House was first built upon in 1811 by Eliakim Barnum's brother-in-law James Norris. Norris' house was burned down accidentally during the War of 1812 by British soldiers who were billeting there. Barnum purchased the property from Norris and built the house which still stands there today.

In designing his house, Barnum was influenced by American architecture popular in New England states at the beginning of the 19th century. These homes were inspired by the neoclassical style, intended to reproduce elements of classical Greek architecture. These elements include a central temple front with flanking wings, articulation of the facade with pilasters linked by elliptical arches, and extensive use of delicately scaled details. The neoclassical elements of the house's exterior are echoed in the ornate woodwork of several interior rooms, particularly the parlour.

Eliakim Barnum came to Haldimand Township from the United States in 1807. He followed the lead of earlier loyalists in settling on the north side of Lake Ontario, along the main route which connecting York with Kingston. Barnum quickly prospered in the area, operating a tavern and distillery. He went on to purchase large tracts of land and open a grist mill in 1830.

Barnum was also a founder of and a key player in the Grafton community. He helped to found St. George's Anglican Church and the first school in the township. He also acted as a justice of the peace and lieutenant-colonel of the Third Northumberland Battalion.

Eliakim Barnum lived to the age of 94, dying in 1877. The house was passed to his youngest son James. James was responsible for dismantling the grist mill, indicating the family's decreased dependence on agriculture. James died in 1907, and the house remained in the family until 1917, when it was sold to the Prentice family. The Prentices lived in the house until 1939, when it was sold to the Architectural Conservancy of Ontario. The Architectural Conservancy of Ontario restored the house to its original state and opened it as Ontario's first house museum.

In 1958, the Architectural Conservancy of Ontario transferred ownership of Barnum House to Haldimand township. The township operated the site as a community museum, and in 1982, the Ontario Heritage Trust, an agency of the Government of Ontario, purchased the house and took over its operation.

The Ontario Heritage Trust performed an extensive restoration of Barnum House between 1989 and 1991 in an effort to ensure the long-term conservation of the site. During the restoration, the Trust completely rebuilt the crumbling foundation, replaced the cedar-shingled roof, restored the windows and siding, and reproduced the original paint colours and wallpaper of the interior. A two-storey addition to the house was also constructed to serve as a gallery and resource centre.

In the ensuing years, the site was operated as a partnership between the Ontario Heritage Trust and the Barnum House Museum Foundation.

After their partnership with the Barnum House Museum Foundation ended in 2002, the Ontario Heritage Trust struggled to keep the museum open. The site was closed for a number of years beginning in September 2003. A large private donation allowed for the site to open for three months in the summer of 2007.

Barnum House is currently home to a large collection of artifacts from the Georgian and Victorian periods. The collection includes a range of artifacts, including a variety of furniture, china, books and newspapers, cookware, children's toys, photographs, scrapbooks, and more. Among these pieces is a Clementi piano from the early nineteenth century, believed to be the only one of its kind to survive. The collection at Barnum House is as significant as the house itself.
