= William Lyon Mackenzie =

Canadian-American journalist and politician (1795–1861)

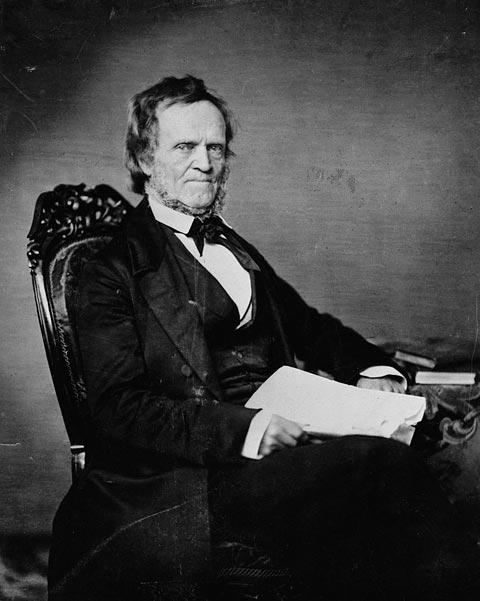
- Mackenzie c. 1851–61

1st Mayor of Toronto
- In office 1834–1835
- Succeeded by: Robert Baldwin Sullivan

Member of the Upper Canada Legislative Assembly for York
- In office 1829–1834
- Succeeded by: Edward William Thomson

Member of the Province of Canada Legislative Assembly for Haldimand County
- In office 1851–1858
- Preceded by: David Thompson

Personal details
- Born: March 12, 1795 Dundee, Scotland
- Died: August 28, 1861 (aged 66) Toronto, Canada West
- Resting place: Toronto Necropolis
- Party: Reform
- Spouse: Isabel Baxter (m. 1822)
- Children: 14
- Occupation: Journalist, politician

William Lyon Mackenzie (Note: The last name is also spelled McKenzie, MacKenzie or M'Kenzie.) (March 12, 1795 – August 28, 1861) was a Scottish-born Canadian-American journalist and politician. He founded newspapers critical of the Family Compact, a term used to identify the establishment of Upper Canada. He represented York County in the Legislative Assembly of Upper Canada and aligned with Reformers. He led the rebels in the Upper Canada Rebellion; after its defeat, he unsuccessfully rallied American support for an invasion of Upper Canada as part of the Patriot War. Although popular for criticising government officials, he failed to implement most of his policy objectives. He is one of the most recognizable Reformers of the early 19th century.

Raised in Dundee, Scotland, Mackenzie emigrated to York, Upper Canada, in 1820. He published his first newspaper, the Colonial Advocate in 1824, and was elected a York County representative to the Legislative Assembly in 1827. York became the city of Toronto in 1834 and Mackenzie was elected its first mayor; he declined the Reformers' nomination to run in the 1835 municipal election. He lost his re-election for the Legislative Assembly in 1836; this convinced him that reforms to the Upper Canadian political system could only happen if citizens initiated an armed conflict. In 1837, he rallied farmers in the area surrounding Toronto and convinced Reform leaders to support the Upper Canada Rebellion. Rebel leaders chose Mackenzie to be their military commander, but were defeated by government troops at the Battle of Montgomery's Tavern.

After briefly taking shelter in the Sharp family barn in Glen Morris, Ontario, Mackenzie fled to the United States and rallied US support to invade Upper Canada and overthrow the province's government. This violated the Neutrality Act, which prohibits invading a foreign country (with which the United States is not at war) from American territory. Mackenzie was arrested and sentenced to eighteen months' imprisonment. He was jailed for more than ten months before he was pardoned by the American president Martin Van Buren. After his release, Mackenzie lived in several cities in New York State and tried to publish newspapers, but these ventures failed. He discovered documents that outlined corrupt financial transactions and government appointments by New York State government officials. He published these documents in two books. The parliament of the newly created Province of Canada, formed from the merger of Upper and Lower Canada, granted Mackenzie amnesty in 1849 and he returned to Canada. He represented the constituency of Haldimand County in the province's legislature from 1851 to 1858. His health deteriorated in 1861 and he died on August 28.

== Early life and immigration (1795–1824) ==
=== Background, early years in Scotland, and education ===
William Lyon Mackenzie was born on March 12, 1795, in Dundee, Scotland. (Note: Some sources state that Mackenzie was born in Springfield, described as a suburb or a section of Dundee. Other sources state he was born in Dundee or in an unstated location near Dundee.) Both of his grandfathers were part of Clan Mackenzie and fought for Charles Edward Stuart at the Battle of Culloden. His mother, Elizabeth Chambers (née Mackenzie), a weaver and goat herder, was orphaned at a young age. His father, Daniel Mackenzie, was also a weaver and seventeen years younger than Elizabeth. The couple married on May 8, 1794. After attending a public dance, Daniel became sick, blind and bedridden. He died a few weeks after William was born.

Although Elizabeth had relatives in Dundee, she insisted on raising William independently and instructed him on the teachings of the Presbyterian church. Mackenzie reported he was raised in poverty, although the extent of his family's wealth is difficult to authenticate. At five years old, Mackenzie received a bursary for a parish grammar school in Dundee. When he was eleven, he used the reading room of the Dundee Advertiser newspaper and meticulously documented and summarized the 957 books he read. In 1811, he was a founding member of the Dundee Rational Institution, a club for scientific discussion.

In 1813, William moved to Alyth, Scotland, to help his mother open a general store. He had a sexual relationship with Isabel Reid, and she gave birth to their son James on July 17, 1814. His congregation agreed to baptize James after Mackenzie endured public criticism for fathering an illegitimate child and paid a fine of thirteen shillings and fourpence (equivalent to £46 in 2025) to the church. A recession followed the end of the Napoleonic Wars in 1815, and Mackenzie's store went bankrupt. He moved to southern England and worked as a bookkeeper for the Kennet and Avon Canal Company. He spent most of his money on wild behaviour and became a gambler.

=== Early years in Canada ===
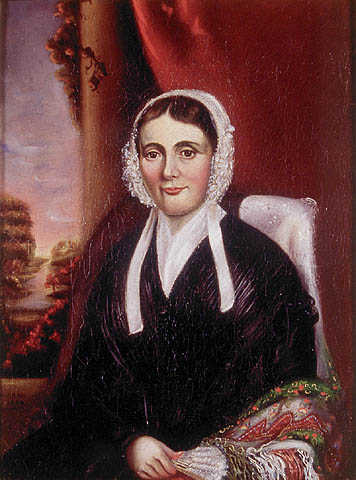
A portrait of Isabel Mackenzie (née Baxter), Mackenzie's wife, painted in 1850

Mackenzie's friend John Lesslie suggested they emigrate to Canada in 1820, and the two men travelled there aboard a schooner named Psyche. When Mackenzie arrived in North America, he worked in Montreal for the owners of the Lachine Canal as a bookkeeper and The Montreal Herald as a journalist. Later that year he moved to York, and the Lesslie family employed him at a bookselling and drugstore business. He wrote articles for the York Observer under the pseudonym Mercator. The Lesslies opened a second shop in Dundas, Upper Canada, and Mackenzie moved there to become its manager.

In 1822, his mother and his son joined Mackenzie in Upper Canada. Elizabeth invited Isabel Baxter to immigrate with them, as she had chosen Baxter to marry her son. Although they were schoolmates, Mackenzie and Baxter did not know each other well before meeting in Upper Canada. The couple wed in Montreal on July 1, 1822, and they had thirteen children. Their daughter Isabel Grace Mackenzie was the mother of Canadian prime minister William Lyon Mackenzie King.

== The Colonial Advocate and early years in York (1823–1827) ==
=== Creation of the Colonial Advocate ===
The partnership between the Lesslies and Mackenzie ended in 1823. Mackenzie moved in 1824 to Queenston, a town near Niagara Falls, to open a new general store. A few months later he sold his store and bought a printing press to create the Colonial Advocate, a political newspaper. He refused government subsidies and relied on subscriptions, although he sent free copies to people he considered influential. The newspaper printed articles that supported the policies of the Upper Canadian Reform movement and criticized government officials. He organized a ceremony for the start of the construction of the memorial to Isaac Brock, a British major-general who died in the War of 1812. Mackenzie sealed a capsule within the memorial's stonework containing an issue of the Colonial Advocate, the Upper Canada Gazette, some coins, and an inscription he had written. Lieutenant governor Peregrine Maitland ordered the capsule's removal a few days after it was placed in the monument because of the Colonial Advocate's critical stance of the government.

In November 1824, Mackenzie relocated the paper and his family to York. Although the Colonial Advocate had the highest circulation among York newspapers, he still lost money on every issue because of low paid subscription numbers and late payments from readers. James Buchanan Macaulay, a government official in York, accused Mackenzie of improper business transactions in 1826 and made jokes about Mackenzie's Scottish heritage and his mother. Mackenzie retaliated by pretending to retire from the paper on May 4, 1826, and published a fictitious meeting where contributors selected Patrick Swift as the new editor. Mackenzie used the Swift alias to continue publishing the Colonial Advocate.

=== Types Riot ===
In the spring of 1826, Mackenzie published articles in the Colonial Advocate under the Swift pseudonym that questioned the governance of the colony and described the personal lives of government officials and their families. On June 8, 1826, rioters attacked the Colonial Advocate office. They harassed Mackenzie's family and employees, destroyed the printing press and threw its movable type, the letters a printing press uses to print documents, into the nearby bay. Mackenzie hired Marshall Spring Bidwell to represent him in a civil suit against eight rioters.

Bidwell argued that Mackenzie lost income from the damaged property and his inability to fulfill printing contracts. Upon cross-examination, Mackenzie's employees confirmed that Mackenzie authored Patrick Swift's editorials in the Colonial Advocate. The court awarded Mackenzie £625 (equivalent to £70,000 in 2024) in damages which he used to pay off his creditors and restart production of his newspaper. One year after the riots, he documented the incident in a series of articles, which he later published as The History of the Destruction of the Colonial Advocate Press.

== Reform member of the Legislative Assembly (1827–1834) ==
=== Election to the Legislative Assembly ===
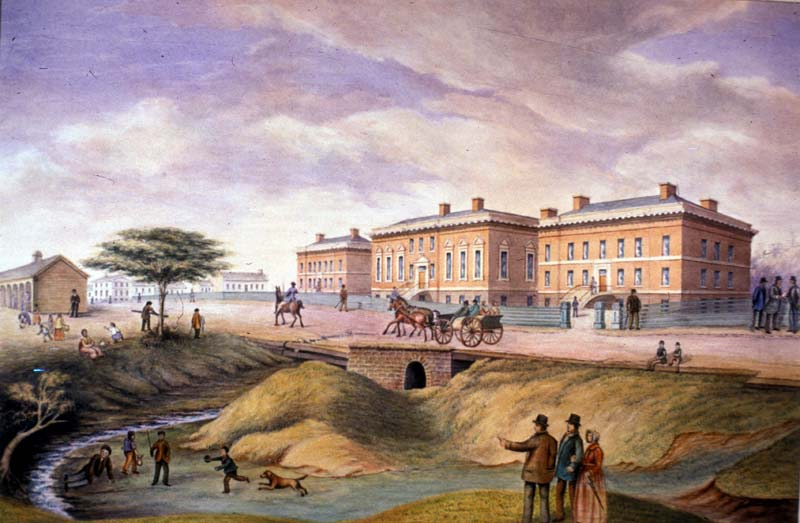
John George Howard's painting of the third Parliament Building in York, built between 1829 and 1832 at Front Street

In December 1827, Mackenzie announced his candidacy to become one of the two representatives for the York County constituency in the 10th Parliament of Upper Canada. The Types Riot settlement was used to fund his campaign and he cited the incident as an example of corruption in Upper Canada. Mackenzie ran as an independent and refused to buy alcohol and treats for supporters or bribe citizens to vote for him, as was done by most politicians at this time. He published weekly articles in his newspaper called "The Parliament Black Book for Upper Canada, or Official Corruption and Hypocrisy Unmasked" where he listed accusations of wrongdoing by his opponents. He came in second in the election, becoming one of the representatives for York County.

In parliament, Mackenzie chaired a committee that assessed the effectiveness of the post office and recommended that local officials should determine local postal rates. He also chaired a committee that evaluated the appointment process of officials who administer elections in Upper Canada. He was a member of committees that looked at the banking and currency regulations of Upper Canada, the condition of roads, and the Church of England's power. Mackenzie opposed infrastructure projects until the province's debt was paid. He spoke against the Welland Canal Company, denouncing the financing methods of William Hamilton Merritt, the company's financial agent, and its close links with the Executive Council, the advisory committee to the lieutenant governor of Upper Canada.

In the election for the 11th Parliament of Upper Canada in 1830, Mackenzie campaigned for legislative control of the budget, independent judges, an executive council that would report to the legislature, and equal rights for Christian denominations. He was re-elected to represent York County in the parliament. The Reform group lost their majority in the legislature, mostly because the Legislative Council of Upper Canada blocked the passage of their proposed legislation. In the new parliament, Mackenzie chaired a committee that recommended increased representation for Upper Canadian towns, a single day for voting in elections, and voting by ballot instead of voice.

During a legislative break, Mackenzie travelled to Quebec City and met with Reform leaders in Lower Canada. He wanted to develop closer ties between the Reform leaders of each province and learn new techniques to oppose Upper Canada government policies. He gathered grievances from several communities in Upper Canada and planned to present these petitions to the Colonial Office in England.

=== Expulsions, re-elections, and appeal to the Colonial Office ===
Mackenzie criticized the Legislative Assembly in the Colonial Advocate and called the legislature a "sycophantic office". For this, the assembly expelled him for libel of the character of the Assembly of Upper Canada. Mackenzie won the resulting by-election on January 2, 1832, by a vote of 119–1. Upon his victory, his supporters gifted him a gold medal worth £250 (equivalent to £31,000 in 2024) and organized a parade through the streets of York. He was expelled again when he printed an article critical of the assemblymen who voted for his first expulsion.

Mackenzie won the second by-election on January 30 with 628 votes against two opponents—a Tory who received 23 votes and a moderate Reformer (who assumed his expulsion barred Mackenzie from becoming a legislator)—who received 96 votes. Mackenzie toured Upper Canada to promote his policies and Tory supporters, unhappy with his agitation, tried to harm him. In Hamilton, William Johnson Kerr organized an assault of Mackenzie by three men. In York, twenty to thirty men stole a wagon he was using as a stage while another mob smashed the windows of the Colonial Advocate office. On March 23, 1832, Mackenzie's effigy was carried around York and burned outside the Colonial Advocate office while James FitzGibbon, a magistrate in York, arrested Mackenzie in an attempt to placate the mob. Mackenzie feared for his life and stopped appearing in public until he left for England.

In April 1832, Mackenzie travelled to London to petition the British government for reforms in Upper Canada. He visited Lord Goderich, the Secretary of State for the Colonies of the United Kingdom, to submit the grievances he had collected in Upper Canada. In November 1832, Goderich sent instructions to the Upper Canada lieutenant governor John Colborne to lessen the legislature's negative attitude against Mackenzie and reform the province's political and financial systems. Tories in Upper Canada were upset that Mackenzie received a positive reception from Goderich and expelled him from the legislature; he was re-elected on November 26 by his constituents. Mackenzie published Sketches of Canada and the United States in 1833 to describe Upper Canada politics. The book named thirty members of the Family Compact, the group that governed Upper Canada and controlled its policies. In November 1833, Mackenzie was expelled from the legislature again.

Edward Smith-Stanley replaced Goderich as the colonial secretary and reversed the Upper Canada reforms. Mackenzie was upset by this and, upon his return to Upper Canada in December 1833, renamed the Colonial Advocate to The Advocate to signal his displeasure with the province's colonial status. During that time he was also re-elected to the legislature by the farmers in York County to fill the vacancy caused by his expulsion the previous month. He won the election by acclamation, but the other members of the legislature would not let him participate in their proceedings and expelled him again. The legislature barred him from sitting as an elected representative until after the 1836 legislative election.

== Upper Canada politics (1834–1836) ==
=== Municipal politics ===
In 1834, York changed its name to Toronto and held elections for its first city council. Mackenzie ran to be an alderman on the council to represent St. David's Ward. He won the election on March 27, 1834, with 148 votes, the largest vote tally of all candidates for alderman in the city. The other aldermen chose him to be Toronto's first mayor by a vote of 10–8. The city council and Mackenzie approved a tax increase to build a boardwalk along King Street despite citizen backlash. He designed the first coat of arms for Toronto and presided as a judge for the city's Police Court, which heard cases of drunkenness and disorderly conduct, physical abuse of children and spouses and city bylaw violations. Mackenzie chose the newly built market buildings as Toronto's city hall and moved the offices of The Advocate into a southern wing of the complex.

In July 1834, Toronto declared a second cholera outbreak. Mackenzie chaired the Toronto Board of Health in his role as mayor, which was tasked to implement the city's response to the outbreak. The board was divided between the Tories and the Reformers and they argued over Mackenzie's alleged interference with the work of health officers. He remained on the board when it restructured two weeks after the start of the outbreak, although he was no longer its chairman. He brought people to the hospital until he was also infected with the disease and remained in his home until he recovered later that year.

Mackenzie declined the nomination for alderman in the 1835 municipal election, printing in his paper that he wanted to focus on provincial politics. Reformers included him on their slate for the election. However he received the fewest votes in his ward.

=== Provincial politics ===
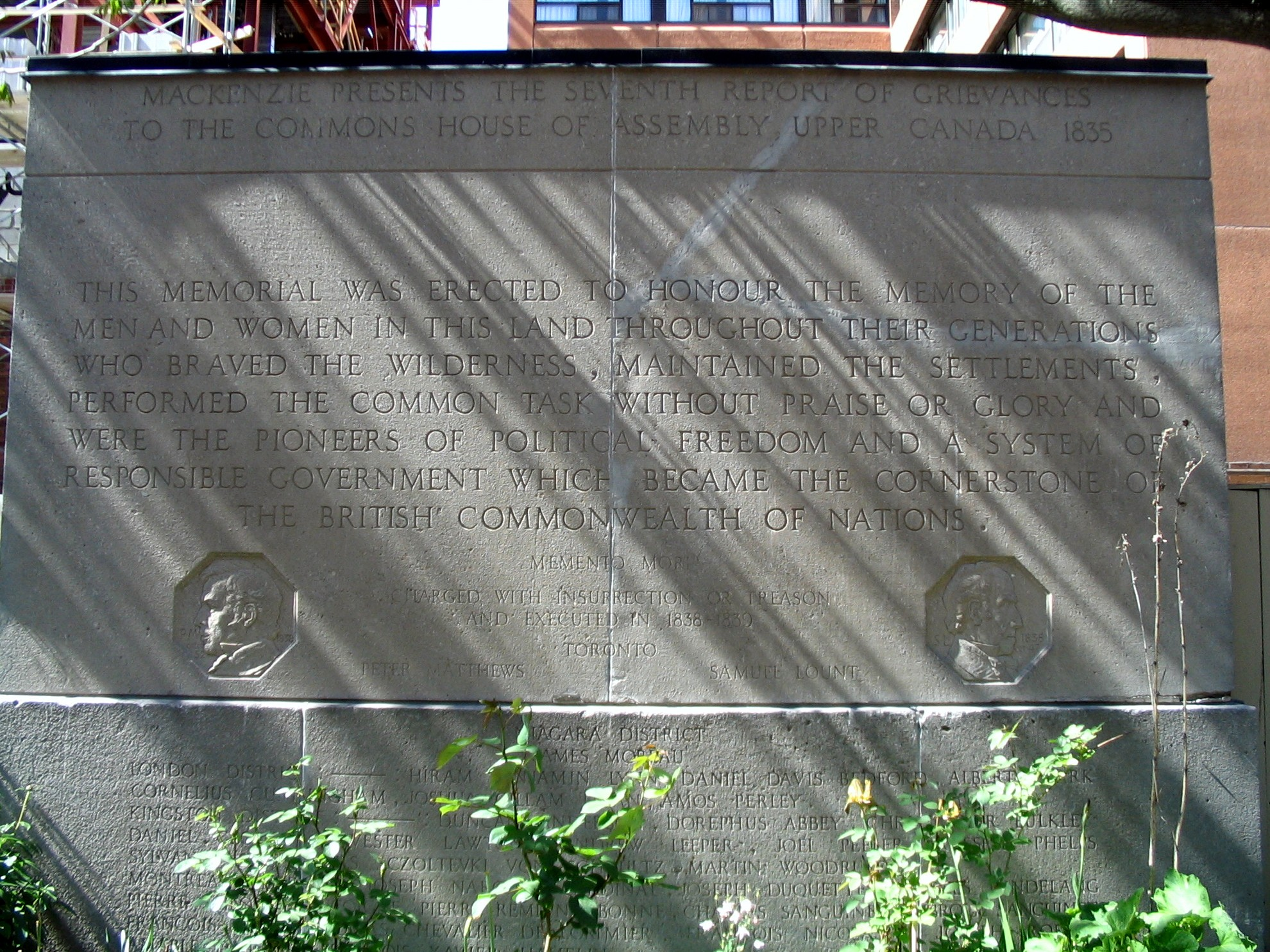
Emanuel Hahn's "Mackenzie Panels" (1938) in the garden of Mackenzie House in Toronto. The panels are dedicated to Reformers who argued for responsible government in Upper Canada.

In the 1834 election for the 12th Parliament of Upper Canada, Mackenzie's York County constituency was split into four, each new section (known as a riding) electing one member. Mackenzie was elected in the 2nd Riding of York by a vote of 334–178. He was strongly supported by The Children of Peace Quakers in the area, one of whom was killed by Orange Order violence. After the election Mackenzie sold The Advocate to William John O'Grady because of its debt and to devote his time to his political career.

The legislature appointed Mackenzie as chairman of the Committee on Grievances. which questioned several members of the Family Compact on their work and government efficiency. The committee documented their findings in The Seventh Report from the Select Committee of the House of Assembly of Upper Canada on Grievances. The report expressed Mackenzie's concern on the excessive power of the executive branch in Upper Canada and the campaigning of government officials for Tory politicians during elections. It also criticized companies that mismanaged funds given to them by the government and the salaries of officials who received patronage appointments. Mackenzie used the Committee on Grievances to investigate the Welland Canal Company. The Upper Canadian government partly owned the company and appointed directors to its board; in 1835 the legislature appointed Mackenzie. He discovered parcels of company land were given to Family Compact members or the Anglican Church for low prices, or swapped with land that was of lesser value. Mackenzie printed his investigation in a newspaper he created that summer in the Niagara peninsula called The Welland Canal.

When the new lieutenant governor Francis Bond Head arrived in Upper Canada, Mackenzie believed Bond Head would side with the Reform movement. After meeting Reformers, Bond Head concluded they were disloyal subjects of the British Empire. He wrote, "Mackenzie's mind seemed to nauseate its subjects" and "with the eccentricity, the volubility, and indeed the appearance of a madman, the tiny creature raved". Bond Head called an election in July 1836 and asked citizens to show loyalty to the British monarch by voting for Tory politicians. Bond Head's campaigning was successful and Reformers across the province lost their elections, Edward William Thomson defeating Mackenzie to represent the 2nd Riding of York in the 13th Parliament. Mackenzie was upset over this loss, weeping in a neighbour's home while supporters consoled him. Feeling disenchanted with the Upper Canada political system, Mackenzie created a new newspaper called the Constitution on July 4, 1836. The paper accused the government and their supporters of corruption and encouraged citizens to prepare "for nobler actions than our tyrants can dream of".

== Upper Canada Rebellion (1837–1838) ==
=== Planning ===
In March 1837 the British government rejected reforms in Upper Canada and reconfirmed the authoritarian power of the lieutenant governor. This ended Mackenzie's hope that the British government would enact his desired reforms in the colony. In July 1837, Mackenzie organized a meeting with Reformers dubbed the Committee of Vigilance. and Mackenzie was selected as the committee's corresponding secretary. Mackenzie published a critique of Bond Head describing him as a tyrant upholding a corrupt government. Mackenzie spent the summer of 1837 organizing vigilance committees throughout Upper Canada and proposed self-government for the Upper Canada colony instead of governance by a distant British Parliament. He liked attending these meetings because they confirmed that his politics were aligned with Upper Canadians who were not involved with governing the colony. He attracted large crowds but also faced physical attacks from Family Compact supporters. During the fall of 1837, he visited Lower Canada and met with their rebel leaders, known as the Patriotes.

On October 9, 1837, Mackenzie received a message from the Patriotes asking him to organize an attack on the Upper Canada government. Mackenzie gathered Reformers the following month and proposed seizing control of the Upper Canada government by force, but the meeting did not reach a consensus. He tried to convince two other Reform leaders, John Rolph and Thomas David Morrison, to help lead a rebellion. He cited that Upper Canadian troops had been sent to suppress the Lower Canada Rebellion, and that a quick attack on Toronto, the capital of Upper Canada, would give rebels control of the government before a militia could be organized against them. Rolph and Morrison asked Mackenzie to determine the level of support for the revolt in the countryside. He travelled north and convinced rural Reform leaders that they could take control of the government by force. The rural leaders accepted and decided that the rebellion would begin on December 7, 1837, and that Anthony Anderson and Samuel Lount would lead the armed rebels. Mackenzie relayed this plan to Rolph and Morrison upon his return to Toronto.

Mackenzie wrote a declaration of independence and printed it at Hoggs Hollow on December 1. A Tory supporter reported the declaration to authorities, and they issued a warrant for Mackenzie's arrest. Upon his return to Toronto, Mackenzie discovered that Rolph had sent him a warning about the warrant. When the messenger could not find Mackenzie, he relayed the warning to Lount instead, who responded by marching a group of rebels towards Toronto to begin the rebellion. Mackenzie attempted to stop Lount but did not reach him in time.

=== Rebellion and exile in the United States ===
Lount's men arrived at Montgomery's Tavern on the night of December 4. That night John Powell accidentally killed Anderson during a scouting expedition. Lount refused to lead the rebellion by himself so the group chose Mackenzie as their new leader.

Mackenzie gathered the rebels at noon on December 5 and marched them towards Toronto. At Gallows Hill, Rolph and Robert Baldwin announced the government's offer of full amnesty for the rebels if they dispersed immediately. Mackenzie and Lount asked that a convention be organized to discuss the province's policies and for the truce to be presented as a written document. Rolph and Baldwin returned, stating the government had withdrawn their offer. Mackenzie grew increasingly erratic and spent the evening punishing Tory families by burning down their houses and trying to force the Upper Canada Postmaster's wife to cook meals for his rebellion. Mackenzie began to marching the rebels towards Toronto, but along the way a group of men fired at them, causing them to flee.

Mackenzie spent the next day robbing a mail coach and kidnapping passing travellers to question them about the government's response to the rebellion. He reassured the rebels at Montgomery's Tavern that 200 men were going to arrive from Buffalo, New York, to help with the rebellion. Mackenzie also sent a letter to a newspaper, The Buffalo Whig and Journal. asking for reiniforcements from the United States.

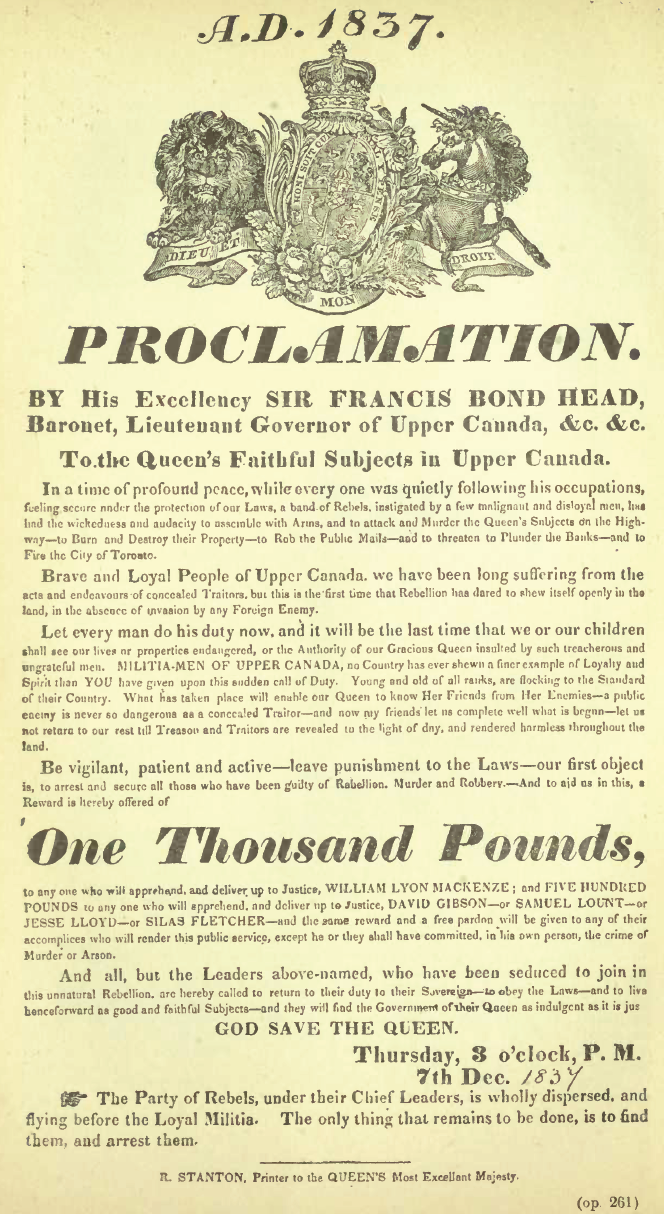
A proclamation posted on December 7, 1837, offering a reward of £1,000 for the capture of William Lyon Mackenzie

On December 7, government forces arrived at Montgomery's Tavern and fired at the rebels' position, causing them to flee. Mackenzie fled north, leaving his papers and cloak behind. He met with rebel leaders who said the rebellion was over and that they needed to flee Upper Canada.

Bond Head issued a warrant and a £1,000 (equivalent to £124,000 in 2024) reward for Mackenzie's apprehension. Mackenzie travelled to the Niagara River and entered the United States by boat.

=== Attempted invasion from the United States ===
Mackenzie arrived in Buffalo on December 11, 1837, and gave a speech outlining his desire for Upper Canada to be independent of Britain. He blamed the failed rebellion on a lack of weapons and supplies. Josiah Trowbridge, Buffalo's mayor, and a newspaper called the Commercial Advertiser interpreted the speech as a rallying cry for help with the rebellion.

On December 12, Mackenzie asked Rensselaer Van Rensselaer to lead an invasion of Upper Canada. Van Rensselaer would lead Patriot forces, composed of volunteers who sympathized with the cause and were living in the United States. Rebel leaders chose Van Rensselaer because the Van Rensselaer family name would bring respectability to their campaign, his father had been a successful military general in the War of 1812, and he claimed to have military experience. Van Rensselaer, Mackenzie and 24 supporters occupied Navy Island on December 14 and Mackenzie proclaimed the State of Upper Canada on the island, declared Upper Canada's separation from the British Empire, proclaimed himself appointed chairman of its new government and wrote a draft for the constitution of the new state. Van Rensselaer planned to use the island as a staging point to invade the Upper Canadian mainland, but this was stopped when British forces destroyed their supply ship, the Caroline, in the Caroline affair. On January 4, Mackenzie travelled to Buffalo to seek medical help for his wife. On the way he was arrested for violating the Neutrality Act, a law that prohibited participating in an invasion of a country against which the US government had not declared war. He was released on $5,000 (equivalent to $148,000 in 2025) bail, paid by three men in Buffalo, and returned to Navy Island in January. British forces invaded the island on January 4, 1838, and the rebels dispersed to the American mainland.

Mackenzie wanted Canadians to lead the next invasion but still receive American assistance. When Van Rensselaer attempted an invasion of Kingston from Hickory Island, Mackenzie refused to participate, citing a lack of confidence in the mission's success. Patriot forces near Detroit attempted to invade Upper Canada but were repelled by British forces. Mackenzie stopped recruiting for the Patriots to avoid ridicule.

== Years in the United States (1838–1849) ==
=== Support for Patriots and Mackenzie's Gazette ===
Mackenzie and his wife arrived in New York City and launched Mackenzie's Gazette on May 12, 1838, after soliciting subscriptions from friends. Its early editions supported the Patriots and focused on Canadian topics, but pivoted to American politics in August 1838. He suspended publication of his paper in the fall of 1838 and moved to Rochester, New York to rebuild the Patriot forces by creating the Canadian Association. The association struggled to attract Canadian members and unsuccessfully fundraised for Mackenzie to publish an account of the Upper Canada Rebellion. The money was reallocated to Mackenzie's defence fund for his upcoming trial. He restarted Mackenzie's Gazette in Rochester on February 23, 1839.

=== Neutrality law trial ===
The trial for Mackenzie's violation of American neutrality laws began on June 19, 1839; he represented himself in the proceedings. The district attorney argued that Mackenzie recruited members, established an army, and stole weapons for an invasion. Mackenzie contended that Britain and the United States were at war because the British destroyed an American ship in the Caroline affair and the Neutrality Act did not apply. Mackenzie wanted to submit evidence that the Upper Canadian Rebellion was a civil war, as a person cannot be convicted of violating the Neutrality Act if the country is engaged in a civil war. The judge refused to allow this evidence because, according to American law, only the United States Congress can declare if a country is in a civil war, which they did not do. Mackenzie was frustrated and did not call further witnesses.

The judge sentenced Mackenzie to eighteen months in jail and a $10 (equivalent to $294 in 2025) fine. Mackenzie did not appeal the ruling after consulting with lawyers. He said after the trial that he was depending upon key witnesses to give testimony, but they did not come to the courtroom. He also denounced the application of neutrality laws, wrongly stating the law had not been applied for nearly fifty years.

=== Imprisonment ===
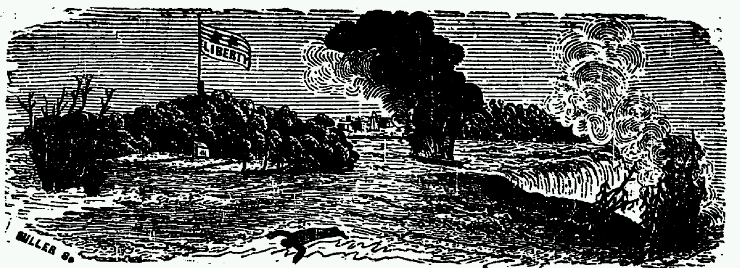
The cover image for The Caroline Almanack, drawn by Mackenzie, depicting the Caroline affair

Mackenzie was imprisoned on June 21, 1839. He chose to be jailed in Rochester to be closer to his family. He published The Caroline Almanack and drew an image of the Caroline affair for the cover. He also published issues of the Gazette, in which he described the trial and appealed for his release. Later issues reported on the upcoming New York state elections, the 1840 United States elections and the Durham Report.

While imprisoned, Mackenzie's mother became sick. He was denied permission to see her, so John Montgomery, the tavern keeper of Montgomery's Inn during the Upper Canada Rebellion, arranged for him to be a witness at a trial. Montgomery convinced the state attorney to hold the trial in Mackenzie's house, and the magistrate stalled the proceedings so Mackenzie could visit his mother. She died a few days later, and Mackenzie witnessed the funeral procession from his prison window. Mackenzie encouraged friends and readers of his newspaper to petition President Martin Van Buren for a pardon, which would release him from imprisonment. Over 300,000 people signed petitions that were circulated in New York State, Michigan, and Ohio. Van Buren did not want others to believe he supported Mackenzie's actions and increase hostilities with Britain, so he was reluctant to grant this pardon. Democrats submitted petitions to the United States Congress calling for Mackenzie's release. Van Buren believed it was politically easier to release Mackenzie from prison than explain his imprisonment to fellow Democrats, so on May 10, 1840, Van Buren granted Mackenzie a pardon.

=== After the pardon ===
After a summer hiatus, the Gazette denounced all invasions into Canada and supported Van Buren's re-election. The paper's subscriptions continued to decline and the last issue was published on December 23, 1840. In April, he launched The Rochester Volunteer and printed articles criticising Canadian Tory legislators. The Volunteer stopped production in September 1841 because the newspaper was not profitable or politically influential. Mackenzie moved back to New York City in June 1842.

Mackenzie worked for several publishers but refused to accept a job as an editor. He became an American citizen in April 1843. He wrote a biography of 500 Irish patriots entitled, The Sons of the Emerald Isle; the first volume was published on February 21, 1844. The goal of the series was to stop nativist attitudes towards immigrants to North America by reminding Americans that their ancestors were also immigrants. Mackenzie attended the founding meeting of the National Reform Association in February 1844. Its goal was to distribute public lands to people who would live on the property, limit the amount of land an individual could own, and outlaw the confiscation of free homesteads given to settlers. He spoke at many meetings and remained on the association's central committee until July 1844.

In July 1844, Mackenzie was nominated as an inspector at the New York custom house, but this was withdrawn after American Whig newspapers criticized him for being an immigrant. He was instead appointed as a clerk in the custom house's archives office. Mackenzie copied the private letters of Jesse Hoyt, a New York State politician, which described negotiations for financial transactions in exchange for government appointments by New York State government officials. After submitting his resignation from the custom house in June 1845, Mackenzie published some of the letters as Lives and Opinions of Benjamin Franklin Butler and Jesse Hoyt. It sold 50,000 copies and made $12,000 (equivalent to $394,000 in 2025) in profit before an injunction stopped the book's sale. The pamphlet's profits were given to the publishers because Mackenzie did not want to benefit from exposing a scandal. In April 1846, Mackenzie published another book based on Hoyt's letters called Life and Times of Martin Van Buren: The Correspondence of His Friends, Family, and Pupils. This book criticized Van Buren and contained Mackenzie's commentary on American politics.

In October 1845, Mackenzie published the second volume of The Sons of the Emerald Isle. Horace Greeley hired him to go to Albany, New York, and report on the New York State Constitutional Convention for the New-York Tribune. He continued to work for the Tribune until his resignation in April 1848.

== Return to Canada (1849–1858) ==
=== Amnesty and return to Canada ===
After the Upper Canada Rebellion, British colonial officials sent Lord Durham to investigate its causes. Durham sent an agent to interview Mackenzie for the report, who told the agent that his grievance against the Upper Canadian government was the composition of the Legislative Council and his desire "to lift the hand of tyranny from the soil". Durham's finding were presented to the British government as the Durham Report and recommended that Upper and Lower Canada be merged into the Province of Canada, which occurred in 1840. After the 1848 election, Reformers held a majority of seats in the Legislative Assembly of the Province of Canada and the Baldwin–Lafontaine ministry was formed.

In 1849 there were revolutionary movements in Europe, including one for an independent Ireland. Lord Elgin, the Governor-General of the Province of Canada and the British monarch's representative to the colony, was concerned that Canadians would become disloyal to the British crown. He hoped that granting amnesty for participants of the 1837 rebellions, on behalf of the monarchy, would increase Canada's loyalty to Britain. The passage of this general amnesty bill in the Canadian Legislature in 1849 allowed Mackenzie to return to Canada.

Mackenzie travelled to Montreal in February and his arrival caused his effigy to be burned in Kingston and riots in Belleville and Toronto. He returned to New York on April 4 and documented his visit in A Winter's Journey through the Canadas. Horace Greeley hired Mackenzie to assemble Whig almanacs and the Business Men's Almanack, which were published in 1850. Mackenzie moved to Toronto in May 1850 with his family, wrote weekly articles for the Tribune and contributed to the Examiner and The Niagara Mail. York County and the provincial government accepted his claim for income he did not receive in the 1830s as a public servant and Welland Canal Company commissioner.

=== Return to the Legislature ===
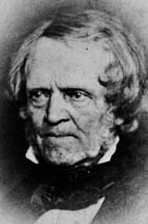
Mackenzie in the 1850s

In February 1851 David Thompson, the representative for Haldimand County in the Parliament of Canada, died. Mackenzie ran as a candidate in the subsequent by-election, promising to be an independent voice in the legislature. He claimed that the government supported his opponent George Brown's campaign and Brown would be beholden to them if elected. Mackenzie won the by-election with 294 votes, defeating Brown and H. N. Case, who both claimed to be running as Reformers, and Ronald McKinnon, the Tory Party candidate. In the legislature, Mackenzie proposed abolishing the Court of Chancery, which Robert Baldwin had reorganized. Mackenzie believed the court was too expensive to maintain and denounced its practice of taking written testimony instead of having lawyers speak before the judges. The majority of Canada West (formerly known as Upper Canada) legislators supported Mackenzie's proposal. The lack of support from Baldwin's colleagues for his project caused him to resign from the Canadian cabinet. In the October 1851 election, Mackenzie campaigned against moderate Reformers like Baldwin, Francis Hincks and James Hervey Price in their constituencies while winning his own election in Haldimand County with 63% of the vote.

Mackenzie refused to participate in the 1852 negotiations to merge the Reform movement with the Clear Grits, a new political movement in Canada West. On October 5, 1852, Mackenzie wrote a letter to the Examiner that Lesslie wanted to edit before printing. Mackenzie rejected the edits and Lesslie did not publish any of Mackenzie's letters. Losing his only way to communicate with his constituents, Mackenzie began his own newspaper on December 25, 1852, called Mackenzie's Weekly Message, which he later renamed the Toronto Weekly Message. Mackenzie faced a difficult re-election campaign in 1854 for his Haldimand seat. Local newspapers complained he only came to the constituency during elections and his colleagues in the assembly had a negative opinion of Mackenzie. His positions against religious school boards caused some voters to withdraw their support. He won the election by 54 votes, a smaller majority than in the previous election.

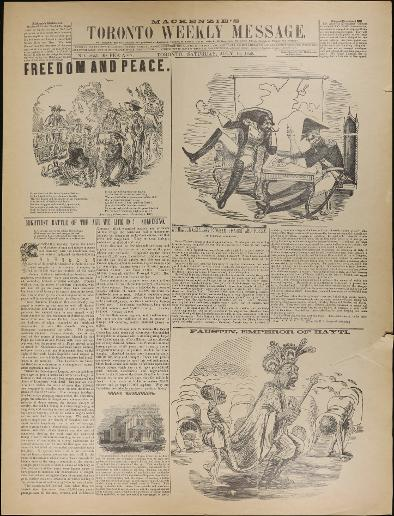
Toronto Weekly Message, July 16, 1859

In the 5th Parliament of the Province of Canada, Mackenzie opposed the MacNab–Morin coalition government and denounced Reform members who supported the administration. He believed it was unconstitutional when Lord Elgin did not give Reform legislators a chance to form a government before accepting a Tory coalition. He was chairman of the Committee of Public Accounts while its reports criticized the province's disorganized record-keeping and exposed government expenditures that parliament had not approved. Mackenzie proposed a resolution that condemned previous administrations for similar acts and parliament removed him from the committee in retaliation.

In 1855, Mackenzie's health deteriorated and in February he closed the Toronto Weekly Message. He wrote columns for Examiner until it merged with The Globe in August 1855. In December 1855, he revived the Message and published the Reader's Almanac in April 1856, outlining his arguments to split the union of Upper and Lower Canada. Mackenzie felt that tax revenue from Upper Canada was subsidizing infrastructure projects in Lower Canada and that the union maintained duplicate government officials, records and executives for Canada East (formerly known as Lower Canada) and Canada West.

In the 1857 election, Mackenzie was narrowly reelected to the constituency of Haldimand with 38% of the vote. He accepted Brown's invitation to caucus with opposition members against the Macdonald–Cartier administration. When the government was defeated, he supported the Brown–Dorion administration, although he criticized the differing viewpoints of ministers and was disappointed when he was not appointed to be a minister. Mackenzie resigned his seat on August 16, 1858, calling the legislature illegitimate after the Governor-General reinstated the Macdonald–Cartier administration without an election.

== Later life and death (1858–1861) ==
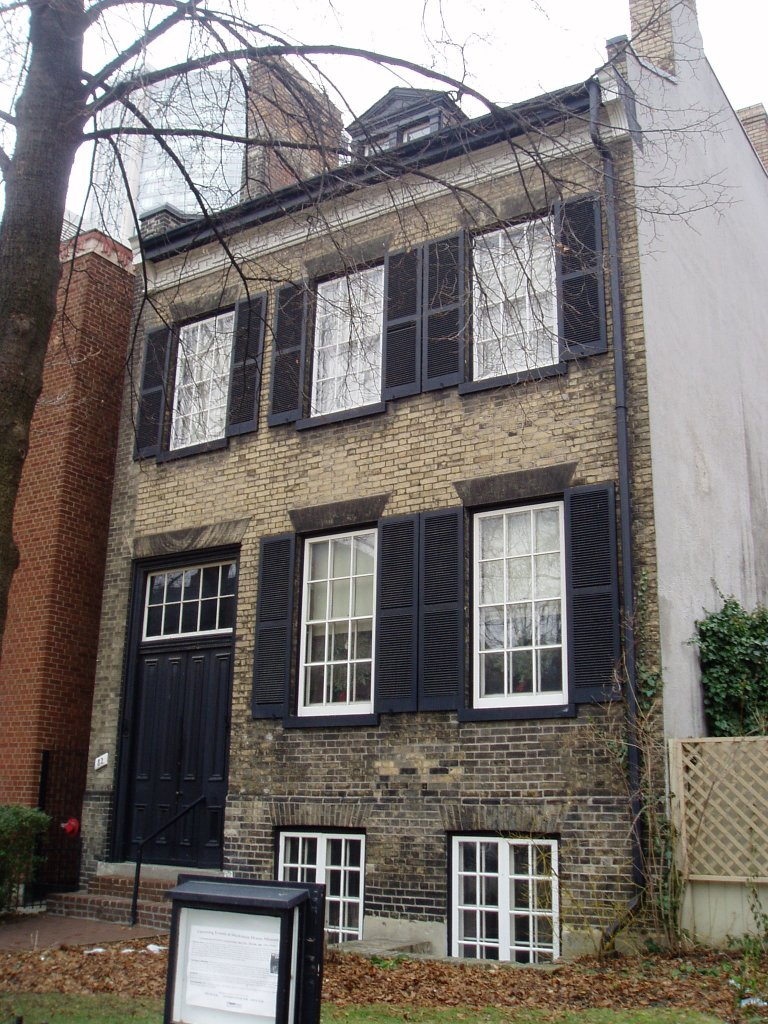
Mackenzie House, built by the Homestead Fund to support Mackenzie in his retirement

At the end of 1858, Mackenzie collected petitions for the dissolution of the Province of Canada and planned to deliver them to the Colonial Office in England. The Homestead Fund, set up by James Lesslie to financially support Mackenzie, refused to fund the trip, so he travelled to New York to fundraise. He was unsuccessful so he cancelled his trip and returned to Toronto. He wrote Almanac for Independence and Freedom for 1860, which outlined arguments for dissolving the Province of Canada. In October he moved to a home in Toronto purchased by the Homestead Fund and ended publication of the Message on September 15, 1860, because of a lack of subscriptions.

In 1861 his health deteriorated and he refused to take medication. At the end of August, he went into a coma and died on August 28. His funeral procession stretched a half-mile (0.8 km) and included Reformers and Family Compact members. He was buried at Toronto Necropolis. A twelve-foot Celtic cross made of grey granite serves as a grave marker. He is buried with his wife, four of his children, his son-in-law Charles Lindsey, and his descendants.

== Writing style ==
Mackenzie wrote about current events and topics he was thinking about at a particular moment. His writing format often lacked structure and used obscure references difficult for today's readers to understand. Historian Lillian F. Gates struggled to comprehend The Life and Times of Martin Van Buren because Mackenzie did not describe events chronologically and in her opinion used too many footnotes and large lists. Frederick Armstrong, another historian, said Mackenzie used long examples and had "excursions into trivia". William Kilbourn critiqued Sketches of Canada and the United States as unconcerned with conventional storytelling techniques or "a sense of order", and Charles Lindsey described the book as disregarding the order of the stories.

Kilbourn stated the Colonial Advocate's articles were better when read aloud and thought Mackenzie's slow pace was similar to "a three-volume Victorian novel". He described The Constitution as "baroque convolutions of style" adding "their harsh jumble of book learning are really not for the printed page". Anthony W. Rasporich differed in his analysis of Mackenzie's writing and believed it was exciting for both subscribers in the 1800s and contemporary readers in 1972. Mackenzie ignored possible consequences when publishing his work and chronicled other people's situations to explain complicated financial concepts. He sometimes plagiarized other newspapers, did not attribute direct quotations, and invented misattributed quotations. He also printed information after promising his sources that he would not.

== Political philosophy and views ==
=== Political philosophy ===
Mackenzie promoted a wide range of policies but was never the lead advocate on any issue. He believed that a person's political ideas should be shaped by their experience and that politicians should be willing to change their political position on an issue. This belief caused Mackenzie to frequently change the issues for which he advocated and his position on government policy. He constantly disagreed with the province's administrators and refused to compromise, believing political institutions were corrupt. Mackenzie chose his political positions impulsively and replaced rational arguments with energetic actions.

Mackenzie's articles in his newspapers favoured radical reform causes. He followed a political theory that believed outlining problems publicly would lead to solutions. He professed in the Colonial Advocate he was a British Whig but became a Jacksonian democrat of the Locofocos faction after meeting Andrew Jackson in 1829. One of Mackenzie's biographers, John Charles Dent, said his policies aligned with Conservative Party policies of the 1880s. John King, Mackenzie's son-in-law, disagreed and stated all Canadian political parties adopted Mackenzie's policies and called him a Liberal. Armstrong described Mackenzie in the 1850s as politically left of the Clear Grits. John Sewell, a biographer of Mackenzie and mayor of Toronto in 1978, said previous biographers described Mackenzie as radical but that current scholars regard him as "an ideologue ranting against the Family Compact".

The social causes Mackenzie supported were conservative for their time. He adopted a puritanical outlook towards gambling and prostitution and wanted women to return to an agrarian lifestyle of taking care of the home. He opposed performers coming to York because of their amoral skits and double entendres. Rasporich described his editorials on Jews, Catholics, French Canadians and black people as prejudiced and in opposition to reform causes. According to Armstrong, Mackenzie's views on minority groups depended on their support for his policies; he was not concerned with the social standing of impoverished or oppressed people. The income gap between the richest and poorest people in Great Britain disturbed Mackenzie and he wanted to avoid this disparity in North America.

Mackenzie wanted the Canadian colonies to keep the Constitution of the United Kingdom but believed British institutions had to be modified for the Upper Canadian social structure and agrarian society. He opposed Upper Canada's lack of representation in the British legislature, especially when they passed legislation governing the province. He supported responsible government to solve the conflicts between the Legislative Assembly and Executive Council of Upper Canada. He wanted to include American ideas, like the election of town magistrates and governors, but avoided publicizing these opinions until 1832 because of public sentiment in Upper Canada that was against American political institutions. When exiled to the United States, Mackenzie declared himself a believer in social democracy and the equality of everyone in society and the law.

=== Religious views ===
Elizabeth Mackenzie gave her son a Presbyterian seceder education. William rebelled against the religion in his youth, but he returned to it upon his arrival to Canada and remained faithful for the rest of his life. He was less reliant on faith after reading texts from the Age of Enlightenment and his religious practice was not an important part of his values. Mackenzie believed clergy should advocate for equality among citizens and opposed clergy who tried to maintain the status quo in the United States and Canada. In the 1830 election, he campaigned for equal rights for religious denominations. He was against attacking Catholics or Protestants for their religious beliefs and believed all Christian denominations persecuted other faiths at different points in their history. He criticized the Papacy in the Message in 1859.

Mackenzie initially praised clergy reserves and their role in creating a colonial upper class, although he believed all Christian denominations should benefit from them. Mackenzie changed his position between 1824 and 1830 and opposed government funding to churches. He criticized a government grant given to British Wesleyans to proselytize to indigenous communities in Upper Canada, causing Egerton Ryerson and Methodists to withdraw their support for the Reform movement in 1833. In his State of Upper Canada constitution, Mackenzie proposed religious equality and a separation of the government and religious institutions. His state would transfer ownership of clergy reserves to the legislature and distribute funds from their sale to municipalities. He wanted to abolish a religious test for employment and services and opposed creating an established church within Upper Canada.

=== Economic policies ===
Mackenzie's economic policies focused on an agrarian structure where agriculture was the foundation of an economy. His ideal economic society contained educated farmers and small business owners served by printing presses. His State of Upper Canada constitution proposed a ban on banks and trading companies, declaring the only way to generate wealth was through labour. He wanted labourers to profit from their work instead of giving payments to privileged politicians, religious leaders or economic institutions. He was against anything perceived as a monopoly and worked to dismantle banking institutions and end a printers union strike in 1836.

Mackenzie struggled to understand how stocks and banknotes denoted wealth. His State of Upper Canada constitution established gold and silver as the only legal tender and would only use coins as currency, whose value the legislature would regulate. He was critical of granting state aid or privileges to companies that would make them monopolies. He wanted tougher laws for lending money to corporations. In 1859, he proposed a requirement for three-fourths of members in parliament, and approval from the government leader, before the government could provide a loan. He opposed farmers buying land on credit because it caused them to buy more property than they could afford. Mackenzie wanted the government to give free plots of land to immigrants or allow people to work in government projects to save enough money for land purchases. He supported tariffs to stop lower-priced products from entering Canadian markets. In the 1830s, he advocated letting the province choose which countries it could trade with because it gave farmers access to cheaper goods and reduced Upper Canada's dependence on British markets.

== Legacy ==
=== Historical reputation ===
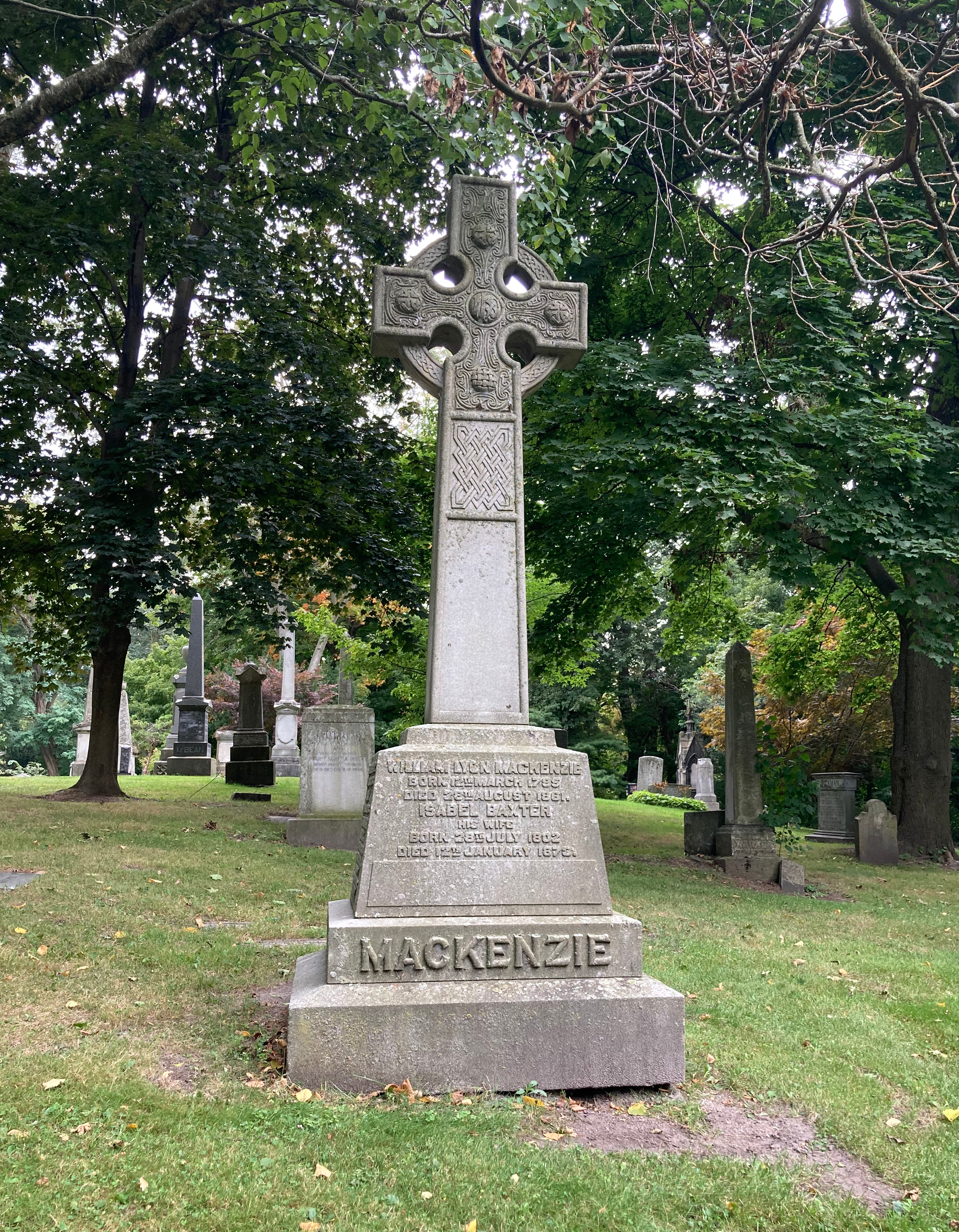
Mackenzie's grave at Toronto Necropolis

Upon his death, newspapers printed obituaries emphasizing Mackenzie's independence, desire for honest public administration, and misguided patriotism. George Brown wrote he was "a man of impulse, prompt in action, full of courage and fire". John King called him "one of the greatest Liberal leaders in Canada". Historian Albert Schrauwers described Mackenzie as the "best-known reformer" of the early 1800s.

John Dent criticized Mackenzie's leadership of the Upper Canada Rebellion and his personal character. His research was refuted by Mackenzie's son James and John King, the latter publishing his opinion as The Other Side of the "Story". A manuscript written by William Dawson LeSueur for the Makers of Canada series was rejected by its publishers because it did not portray Mackenzie as an influencer in Canada's creation. Instead, the publishers asked Lindsey and his son to condense Lindsey's previous biography for its inclusion in the series.

Mackenzie emphasized the moral and political failings of the government but was unsure of how to create his ideal society. His term as mayor was overshadowed by a desire to reform government institutions instead of focusing on the problems of the city. His policy proposals were often rejected as politically impossible to implement. Many of Mackenzie's biographers agree that he delayed the implementation of responsible government because the Upper Canada Rebellion caused an exodus of Reform politicians from the colony.

=== Memorials ===
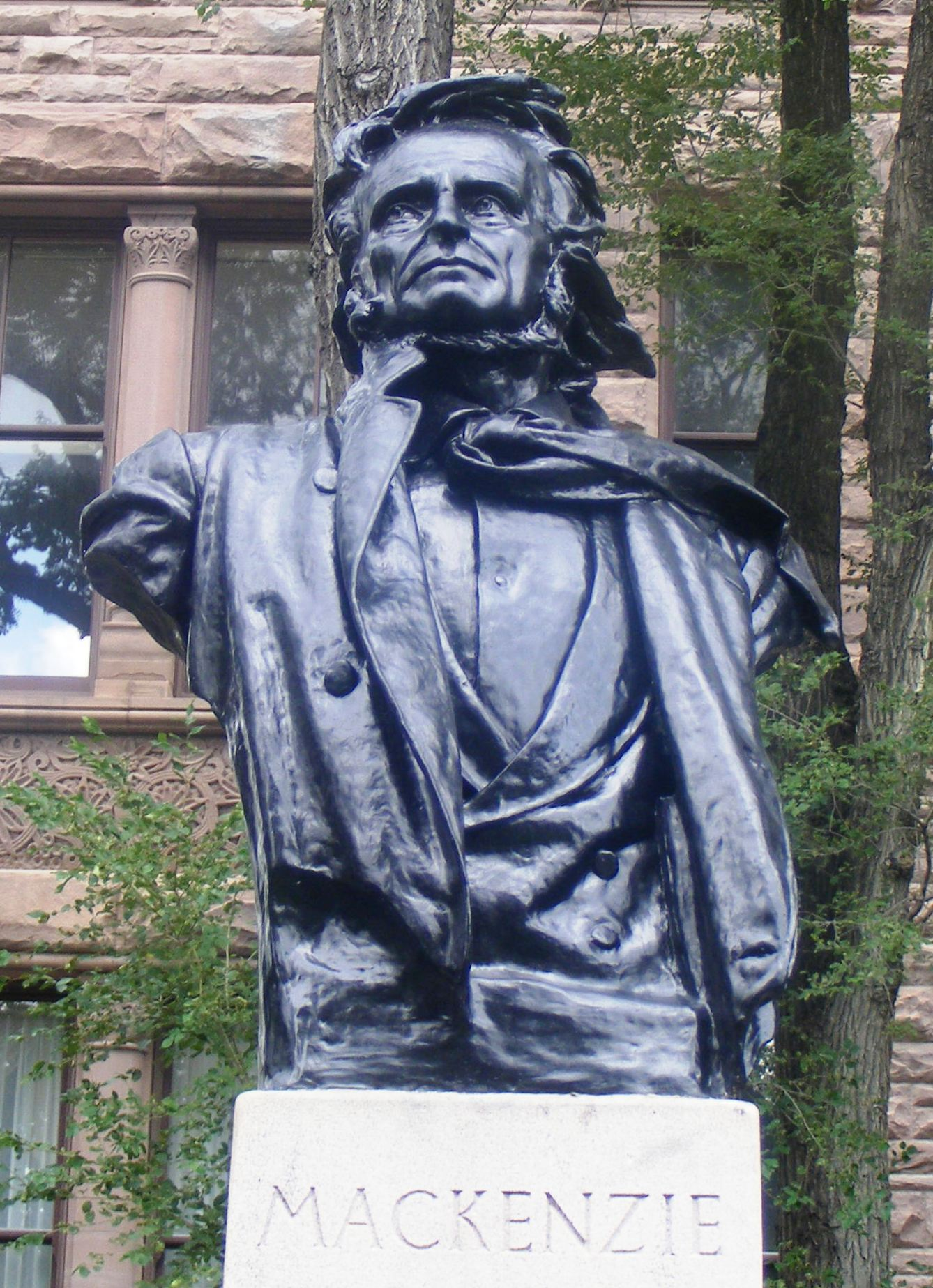
Walter Seymour Allward's bust of William Lyon Mackenzie outside the Legislative Assembly of Ontario in Toronto

Mackenzie's last home was designated as a historical site in 1936 to prevent its demolition. The Mackenzie Homestead Foundation turned the building into the Mackenzie House museum and operated the facility until it was sold to the City of Toronto in 1960. The William Lyon Mackenzie Centennial Committee commissioned a monument to Mackenzie which was sculpted by Walter Seymour Allward and placed in Queen's Park west of the Legislative Assembly of Ontario in 1940. A plaque dedicated to Mackenzie was erected in Dundee next to the Steeple Church. Dennis Lee included Mackenzie in his poem 1838 and John Robert Colombo called Mackenzie a hero in The Mackenzie Poems. In 1976, Rick Salutin wrote a play about Mackenzie and the Upper Canada Rebellion called 1837: The Farmers' Revolt. In 1991 a group of volunteers opened the Mackenzie Printery museum in Mackenzie's Queenston home to document the newspaper industry in North America.

In the Spanish Civil War Canadian volunteers formed the Mackenzie–Papineau Battalion, naming it after Mackenzie and the leader of the Lower Canada Rebellion, Louis-Joseph Papineau. In 1960, Southview Collegiate in North York was renamed William Lyon Mackenzie Collegiate Institute after students suggested the name. The Toronto Fire Services named a fireboat the William Lyon Mackenzie in 1964. "The Rebel Mayor", a Twitter account which posted satirical comments on candidates in Toronto's 2010 mayoral election, was written in Mackenzie's persona. Shawn Micallef, a journalist for Eye Weekly and Spacing magazine, created the feed.

== Works ==
- The History of the Destruction of the Colonial Advocate Press by Officers of the Provincial Government of Upper Canada and Law Students of the Attorney & Solicitor General (1827)
- Catechism of Education: Part First (1830)
- Sketches of Canada and the United States (1833)
- The seventh report from the Select Committee of the House of Assembly of Upper Canada on grievances (1835)
- Mackenzie's Own Narrative of the Late Rebellion (1837)
- The Caroline Almanack (1840)
- The Sons of the Emerald Isle, or Lives of One Thousand Remarkable Irishmen (1845)
- The Lives and Opinions of Benj'n Franklin Butler, United States District Attorney for the Southern District of New York; and Jesse Hoyt, Counsellor at Law, formerly Collector of Customs for the Port of New York (1845)
- The Life and Times of Martin Van Buren: the Correspondence of his Friends, Family and Pupils (1846)
- Almanac for Independence and Freedom for 1860 (1860)

== See also ==
- List of people pardoned or granted clemency by the president of the United States

== Notes ==
Political offices
Preceded by Alexander Macdonell as Chairman of the Home District Council	Mayor of Toronto; 1834	Succeeded by Robert Baldwin Sullivan
