= 12th Parliament of Upper Canada =

Parliament for Upper Canada 1835–1836

←	11th	13th	→
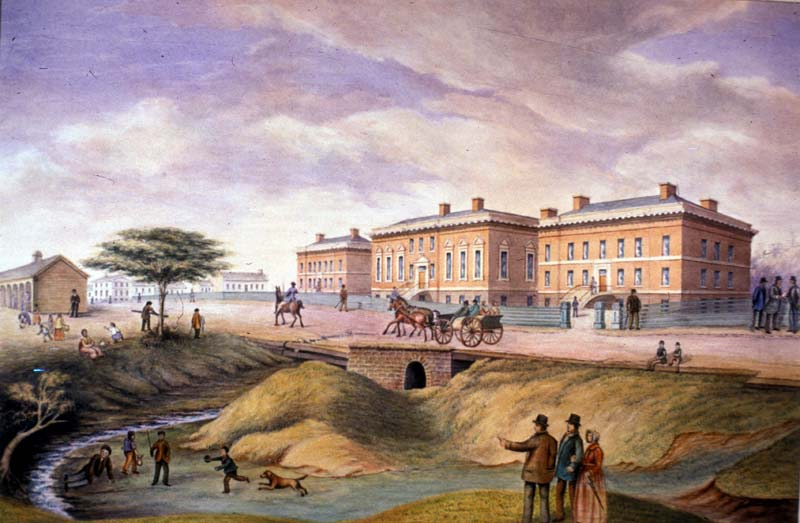
- Third Parliament Buildings of Upper Canada

Overview
- Legislative body: Parliament of Upper Canada
- Jurisdiction: Upper Canada, British North America
- Meeting place: Third Parliament Buildings of Upper Canada
- Term: Jan. 15, 1835 – May 28, 1836
- Election: October 1834

Crown of the United Kingdom
- King: William IV
- Lieutenant Governor: Sir John Colborne (to 1836); Sir Francis Bond Head (from 1836)

Legislative Council
- Speaker (Note: By custom, the Chief Justice of the Court of King's Bench): John Beverley Robinson

House of Assembly
- Members: 61
- Speaker: Marshall Spring Bidwell

The 12th Parliament of Upper Canada was the legislature of Upper Canada, a British colony within British North America, that was in session between 1835 and mid 1836. Its composition was largely determined by the general elections eld in October 1834.

After having been rendered the "glorious minority" in the 11th parliament, the reformers triumphed in the 1834 election. The 12th parliament opened on 15 January 1835, and the reformer in majority elected Marshall Spring Bidwell as speaker. The session of 1835 ran a similar course to the 1828 session of the 10th parliament which reformers also dominated. Election petitions consumed a large part of the time of the house. Feeling increased pressure from the rising tide of political agitation, Lieutenant Governor Sir John Colborne requested his recall, and was succeeded by Sir Francis Bond Head.

Having earned a reformist reputation for his vigorous administration as the assistant poor law commissioner for Kent, the British Cabinet mistaken Head as the suitable conciliator needed in Upper Canada. His early moves were promising for the reformers, and he succeeded in persuading leading moderate reformers John Rolph and Robert Baldwin, as well as receiver general John Henry Dunn, to join the Executive Council, although the appointments were opposed by the more radical Mackenzie. In any case, when Baldwin insisted that Head confer with council on all items of executive business and declaring that he must accept their advice on certain vital issues, Head promptly refused, leading to the mass resignation of council.

On 28 May 1836 Head dissolved the 12th parliament and ordered a new election because the House of Assembly, dominated by reformers, had refused to pass any new money bills. The assembly also labelled Head a deceitful tyrant after he had invoked his right to consult them (the representatives of the people) only on certain specific matters. It was succeeded by the 13th Parliament of Upper Canada in November 1836.

== Sessions ==
The 12th Parliament had two sessions: 15 January 1835 to 16 April 1835, and 14 January 1836 to 20 April 1836. All sessions were held at York, Upper Canada. Both the Legislative Council and the House of Assembly sat at the third Parliament Buildings of Upper Canada.

Sessions	Start	End
1st	15 January 1835	16 April 1835
2nd	14 January 1836	20 April 1836

== Seats allocation ==
The House of Assembly expanded by 9 seats from the 52 seats in the 11th parliament to 61 seats in the 12th parliament.

- 44 seats from 22 duo-seat counties (▲4) - as more counties' population surpass the 4000 threshold, duo-seat counties continue to account for more than two-third of the seats. Kent, Prescott and Simcoe join the rank of duo-seat counties.
- 3 single seat counties - Haldimand remained a single seat county, and was joined by Russell at the 1834 general election and Huron in July 1835.
- 6 towns (▲2) - Cornwall and Hamilton joined the rank of Brockville, Kingston, Niagara, and York to be the fifth and sixth town with their own representation.
- 8 ridings (▲6) - York county replaced its duo seats with 4 seats, one for each of its 4 ridings. 2nd and 3rd Lincoln ceased sharing and each became their own riding seat.
- 0 shared (▼3) - in addition to 2nd and 3rd Lincoln, Prescott & Russell also ceased sharing a seat.

From a regional perspective, the eastern, western regions, and the home districts region all increased or maintained their share of representation with addition seats being allocated. Midland in the other hand gain no seats and thus saw their clout reduced.

== Members ==
Riding	Member	First elected/ previously elected	No. of terms
Brockville	David Jones	1824, 1834	2nd term*
Carleton	Edward Malloch	1834	1st term
Carleton	John Bower Lewis	1830	2nd term
Cornwall	Archibald McLean – Speaker 1836	1820	5th term
Dundas	Peter Shaver	1820, 1828	4th term*
Dundas	John Cook	1830	2nd term
Durham	George Strange Boulton	1824, 1830	3rd term*
Durham	John Brown	1830	2nd term
Essex	Francis Xavier Caldwell	1834	1st term
Essex	John Alexander Wilkinson	1834	1st term
Frontenac	Jacob Shibley	1834	1st term
Frontenac	John Strange	1834	1st term
Glengarry	Donald Macdonell	1824	4th term
Glengarry	Alexander Chisholm	1834	1st term
Grenville	Hiram Norton	1831	2nd term
Grenville	William Benjamin Wells	1834	1st term
Haldimand	William Hamilton Merritt	1832	2nd term
Halton	Caleb Hopkins	1828, 1834	2nd term*
Halton	James Durand, Jr.	1834	1st term
Hamilton	Allan Napier MacNab	1830	2nd term
Hastings	Henry W. Yager	1834	1st term
Hastings	James Hunter Samson	1828	3rd term
Huron	Robert Graham Dunlop (July 1835)	1835	1st term
Kent	William McCrae	1834	1st term
Kent	Nathan Cornwall	1834	1st term
Kingston	Christopher Alexander Hagerman	1830	2nd term
Lanark	William Morris	1820	5th term
Lanark	Alexander Thom (1836)	1836	1st term
Lanark	Josias Tayler	1834	1st term
Leeds	Ogle Robert Gowan	1834	1st term
Leeds	William Buell (Apr 1836)	1828, 1836	2nd term*
Leeds	Robert Sympson Jameson	1834	1st term
Leeds	Matthew M. Howard (Apr 1836)	1830, 1836	2nd term*
Lennox & Addington	Marshall Spring Bidwell – Speaker 1835	1824	4th term
Lennox & Addington	Peter Perry	1824	4th term
1st Lincoln County	Dennis Woolverton	1834	1st term
2nd Lincoln	George Rykert	1834	1st term
3rd Lincoln	John Johnston Lefferty	1825, 1834	3rd term*
3rd Lincoln	David Thorburn (Feb 1835)	1835	1st term
4th Lincoln	Gilbert McMicking	1834	1st term
Middlesex	Thomas Parke	1834	1st term
Middlesex	Elias Moore	1834	1st term
Niagara (town)	Charles Richardson	1834	1st term
Norfolk	Francis Leigh Walsh	1834	1st term
Norfolk	David Duncombe	1834	1st term
Northumberland	Alexander McDonell	1834	1st term
Northumberland	John Gilchrist	1834	1st term
Oxford	Charles Duncombe	1830	2nd term
Oxford	Robert Alway	1834	1st term
Prescott	Alexander MacDonell of Greenfield	1820, 1835	3rd term*
Prescott	John Chesser (Apr 1835)	1835	1st term
Prescott	Charles Waters	1834	1st term
Prince Edward	John Philip Roblin	1830	2nd term
Prince Edward	James Wilson	1808, 1820, 1834	5th term*
Russell	Thomas McKay	1834	1st term
Simcoe	William Benjamin Robinson	1830	2nd term
Simcoe	Samuel Lount	1834	1st term
Stormont	William Bruce	1834	1st term
Stormont	Donald Aeneas MacDonell	1834	1st term
Toronto	James Edward Small	1834	1st term
Wentworth	Harmannus Smith	1834	1st term
Wentworth	Jacob Rymal	1834	1st term
1st York	David Gibson	1834	1st term
2nd York	William Lyon Mackenzie	1828	3rd term
3rd York	Thomas David Morrison	1834	1st term
4th York	John McIntosh	1834	1st term

== See also ==
- Legislative Council of Upper Canada
- Executive Council of Upper Canada
- Legislative Assembly of Upper Canada
- Lieutenant Governors of Upper Canada, 1791-1841
- Historical federal electoral districts of Canada
- List of Ontario provincial electoral districts
