= 11th Parliament of Upper Canada =

Parliament for Upper Canada 1831–1834

The 11th Parliament of Upper Canada was opened on 7 January 1831. Elections in Upper Canada had been held in October 1830, and all sessions were held at York, then later at Toronto. This parliament was dissolved on 1 September 1834.

The House of Assembly had four sessions, from 7 January 1831 to 6 March 1834.

Both the House and Parliament sat at the old York Court House on King Street until 1832 and moved to the third Parliament Buildings of Upper Canada for the remaining session.

Sessions	Start	End
1st	7 January 1831	16 March 1831
2nd	17 November 1831	13 February 1832
3rd	31 October 1832	13 February 1833
4th	19 November 1833	6 March 1834

== Members ==
Riding	Member	First elected/ previously elected	No. of terms
Brockville	Henry Jones	1830	1st term
Carleton	John Bower Lewis	1830	1st term
Carleton	Hamnett Kirkes Pinhey	1830	1st term
Carleton	George Lyon	1830	1st term
Dundas	Peter Shaver	1820, 1828	3rd term*
Dundas	John Cook	1830	1st term
Durham	George Strange Boulton	1824, 1830	2nd term*
Durham	John Brown	1830	1st term
Essex	William Elliott	1830	1st term
Essex	Jean-Baptiste Maçon	1830	1st term
Frontenac	Hugh Christopher Thomson	1824	3rd term
Frontenac	John Campbell	1830	1st term
Glengarry	Alexander McMartin	1828	2nd term
Glengarry	Alexander Fraser	1828	2nd term
Grenville	Richard Duncan Fraser	1830	1st term
Grenville	Edward Jessup III	1830	1st term
Grenville	Hiram Norton (1831)	1831	1st term
Haldimand	John Brant	1830	1st term
Haldimand	John Warren (1831)	1831	1st term
Haldimand	William Hamilton Merritt (Nov 1832)	1832	1st term
Halton	William Chisholm	1820, 1830	2nd term*
Halton	James Crooks	1830	1st term
Halton	Absalom Shade (Apr 1831)	1831	1st term
Hastings	Reuben White	1830	1st term
Hastings	James Hunter Samson	1828	2nd term
Kent	William Bent Berczy	1828	2nd term
Kingston	Christopher Alexander Hagerman	1830	1st term
Lanark	William Morris	1820	4th term
Lanark	Donald Fraser	1832	1st term
Leeds	William Buell, Jr.	1828	2nd term
Leeds	Matthew Munsel Howard	1830	1st term
Lennox & Addington	Marshall Spring Bidwell	1824	3rd term
Lennox & Addington	Peter Perry	1824	3rd term
1st Lincoln County	John Clarke	1820, 1830	3rd term*
2nd & 3rd Lincoln	William Crooks	1830	1st term
2nd & 3rd Lincoln	Bartholomew Crannell Beardsley	1824, 1830	2nd term*
4th Lincoln	Robert Randal	1820	4th term
Middlesex	Mahlon Burwell	1812, 1830	4th term*
Middlesex	Russell Mount	1830	1st term
Niagara (town)	Henry John Boulton	1830	1st term
Norfolk	Duncan McCall	1824	3rd term
Norfolk	Colin McNeilledge (Jan 1833)	1833	1st term
Norfolk	William Wilson	1830	1st term
Northumberland	Archibald Macdonald	1830	1st term
Northumberland	James Lyons	1824	3rd term
Oxford	Charles Fortescue Ingersoll	1824, 1830	2nd term*
Oxford	Thomas Hornor (Nov 1832)	1832	1st term
Oxford	Charles Duncombe	1830	1st term
Prescott & Russell	Donald Macdonell	1824	3rd term
Prince Edward	Asa Werden	1830	1st term
Prince Edward	John Philip Roblin	1830	1st term
Simcoe	William Benjamin Robinson	1830	1st term
Stormont	Archibald McLean – Speaker 1831–1834	1820	4th term
Stormont	Philip VanKoughnet	1816, 1830	3rd term*
Wentworth	John Willson	1820	4th term
Wentworth	Allan MacNab	1830	1st term
York (town)	William Botsford Jarvis	1830	1st term
York	William Lyon Mackenzie	1828	2nd term
York	Jesse Ketchum	1828	2nd term

== See also ==
- Legislative Council of Upper Canada
- Executive Council of Upper Canada
- Legislative Assembly of Upper Canada
- Lieutenant Governors of Upper Canada, 1791-1841
- Historical federal electoral districts of Canada
- List of Ontario provincial electoral districts
