= 8th Parliament of Upper Canada =

Parliament for Upper Canada 1821–1824

The 8th Parliament of Upper Canada was opened 31 January 1821. Elections in Upper Canada had been held in July 1820. All sessions were held at York, Upper Canada and sat in the second Parliament Buildings of Upper Canada. This parliament was dissolved 22 June 1824.

The House of Assembly of the 8th Parliament of Upper Canada had four sessions 31 January 1821 to 19 January 1824: It sat at the second Parliament Buildings of Upper Canada until a fire destroyed it and moved to the York General Hospital.

This parliament saw the emergence of the power and conservative Family Compact with member Sir John Robinson, 1st Baronet, of Toronto.

Sessions	Start	End
1st	31 January 1821	14 February 1821
2nd	21 November 1821	17 January 1822
3rd	15 January 1823	19 March 1823
4th	11 November 1823	19 January 1824

== Members ==
Riding	Member	First elected/ previously elected	No. of terms
Carleton	William Morris	1820	1st term
Dundas	Peter Shaver	1820	1st term
Durham	Samuel Street Wilmot	1820	1st term
Essex	François Baby	1820	1st term
Essex	William McCormick	1812	3rd term
Frontenac	Allan McLean	1804	5th term
Glengarry	Alexander MacDonell of Greenfield	1820	1st term
Glengarry	Alexander McMartin	1812	3rd term
Grenville	Walter F. Gates	1820	1st term
Grenville	Jonas Jones	1816	2nd term
Halton	James Crooks	1820	1st term
Halton	William Chisholm	1820	1st term
Hastings	Rueben White	1820	1st term
Kent	James Gordon	1820	1st term
Kingston	Christopher Alexander Hagerman	1820	1st term
Leeds	Levius Peters Sherwood – Speaker 1821–1824	1820	1st term
Leeds	Charles Jones	1820	1st term
Lennox & Addington	Samuel Casey	1820	1st term
Lennox & Addington	Daniel Hagerman	1820	1st term
Lennox & Addington	Barnabas Bidwell (1821)	1821	1st term
Lennox & Addington	Matthew Clark (1822)	1822	1st term
Lennox & Addington	George Ham (1822)	1822	1st term
1st Lincoln County	John Clarke	1820	1st term
2nd Lincoln	William Johnson Kerr	1820	1st term
3rd Lincoln	Robert Hamilton	1820	1st term
4th Lincoln	Robert Randal	1820	1st term
Middlesex	Mahlon Burwell	1820	1st term
Middlesex	John Bostwick (Mar 1821)	1821	1st term
Norfolk	Robert Nichol	1812	3rd term
Norfolk	Francis Leigh Walsh	1820	1st term
Northumberland	David McGregor Rogers	1820	1st term
Northumberland	Henry Ruttan	1820	1st term
Oxford	Thomas Hornor	1820	1st term
Prescott & Russell	William Hamilton	1820	1st term
Prescott & Russell	David Pattee (Mar 1821)	1821	1st term
Prince Edward	James Wilson	1820	1st term
Prince Edward	Paul Peterson	1820	1st term
Stormont	Archibald McLean	1820	1st term
Stormont	Philip VanKoughnet	1816	2nd term
Wentworth	George Hamilton	1820	1st term
Wentworth	John Willson	1820	1st term
York (town)	John Beverley Robinson	1820	1st term
York & Simcoe	Peter Robinson	1816	2nd term
York	William Warren Baldwin	1820	1st term

== See also ==
- Legislative Council of Upper Canada
- Executive Council of Upper Canada
- Legislative Assembly of Upper Canada
- Lieutenant Governors of Upper Canada, 1791-1841
- Historical federal electoral districts of Canada
- List of Ontario provincial electoral districts
