= MacDonell =

- Language: Gaelic

Origin
- Meaning: "Son of Dòmhnall"
- Region of origin: Scotland

Other names
- Variant forms: Donnell, MacDonnell, McConnell, MacConnell, Donald, MacDonald, McDonald, Donaldson

MacDonell, Macdonell, or McDonell is a surname of Scottish origin. It is an anglicized form of the Gaelic patronymic Mac Dhòmhnaill, meaning "son of Dòmhnall". The personal name Dòmhnall is composed of the elements domno "world" and val "might", "rule". The name is a variation of other Clan Donald surnames such as MacDonald and Donaldson.

Notable people with the surname include:

- A. G. Macdonell (1895–1941), Scottish writer, journalist, and broadcaster
- Alasdair Ranaldson MacDonell of Glengarry (1771–1828), chief of the Clan MacDonnel of Glengarry
- Alastair Dubh MacDonell (died 1721), Scottish Jacobite soldier
- Alexander Macdonell (1762–1840), Canadian Roman Catholic bishop
- Alexander Macdonell (1762–1842), Canadian soldier and political figure
- Alexander McDonell (1786–1861), Scottish-Canadian immigration agent and political figure
- Angus Claude Macdonell (1861–1924), Canadian lawyer and politician
- Angus MacDonell (1751–1817), Scottish-Canadian soldier and political figure
- Angus Macdonell of Collachie (died 1804), Scottish-Canadian lawyer and political figure
- Archibald Hayes Macdonell (1868–1939), Canadian soldier and politician
- Arthur Anthony Macdonell (1854–1930), British Sanskrit scholar
- Brian MacDonell (born 1935), New Zealand politician
- Donald Aeneas MacDonell (1794–1879), Canadian soldier and politician
- Donald Macdonell (Upper Canada politician) (1778–1861), Scottish-Canadian politician
- Donald MacDonell (RAF officer) (1913–1999), British flying ace of the Royal Air Force
- Hugh McDonell (died 1833), Scottish-Canadian soldier and politician
- Sir Hugh MacDonell (1832–1904), British diplomat
- James Macdonell (1841–1879), Scottish journalist
- John Alexander MacDonell (1854–1912), Canadian politician
- John MacDonell (contemporary), Canadian politician from Nova Scotia
- John MacDonell (1728–1810), Scottish-Canadian military man and colonist
- John MacDonell (born 1966), Canadian lawyer and politician from Nova Scotia
- John Macdonell (1785–1812), Scottish-Canadian aide-de-camp to British Major General Isaac Brock during the War of 1812
- John McDonell (1768–1850), Scottish-Canadian soldier, judge and political figure
- John McDonell (Upper Canada politician, died 1809) (1758–1809), Canadian soldier, judge, and political figure
- Miles Macdonell (1767–1828), Scottish-Canadian military man and colonist
- Nick McDonell (born 1984), American writer
- Philip James Macdonell, (1873–1940), British Colonial judge
- Sharon MacDonell (born 1962), American journalist and politician
- Terry McDonell (born 1944), American journalist and editor
- William Andrew Macdonell (1853–1920), Canadian Roman Catholic bishop

Scottish clan

- Clan MacDonell of Glengarry
- Clan MacDonell of Keppoch
