= 7th Parliament of Upper Canada =

Parliament for Upper Canada 1817–1820

The 7th Parliament of Upper Canada was opened 4 February 1817. Elections in Upper Canada had been held in July 1816. All sessions were held at York, Upper Canada at the home of Chief Justice of the Court William Henry Draper. This parliament was dissolved 3 May 1820 on the announcement of the death of King George III.

The House of Assembly of the 7th Parliament of Upper Canada had five sessions 4 February 1817 to 7 March 1820:

Sessions	Start	End
1st	4 February 1817	7 April 1817
2nd	5 February 1818	1 April 1818
3rd	12 October 1818	27 November 1818
4th	7 June 1819	12 July 1819
5th	21 February 1820	7 March 1820

== Members ==
Riding	Member	First elected/ previously elected	No. of terms
Dundas	John Crysler	1804, 1812	3rd term*
Essex	William McCormick	1812	2nd term
Essex	George Benson Hall	1816	1st term
Frontenac	Allan McLean 1817-1820	1804	4th term
Glengarry	Alexander McMartin	1812	2nd term
Glengarry	John Cameron	1816	1st term
Grenville	Jonas Jones	1816	1st term
Halton	Moses Gamble	1816	1st term
Halton	Richard Hatt (Feb 1818)	1818	1st term
Hastings & Ameliasburgh Township	James McNabb	1808, 1816	2nd term*
Kent	Joshua Cornwall	1816	1st term
Leeds	Peter Howard	1816	1st term
Lennox & Addington	Willet Casey	1816	1st term
Lennox & Addington	Isaac Fraser	1816	1st term
1st Lincoln County	Robert Nelles	1816	1st term
2nd Lincoln	Ralfe Clench	1796, 1812	4th term*
3rd Lincoln	David Secord	1808, 1816	2nd term*
4th Lincoln	Isaac Swayze	1792, 1804, 1814	5th term*
Norfolk	Robert Nichol	1812	2nd term
Northumberland and Durham	Zacheus Burnham	1816	1st term
Oxford & Middlesex	Mahlon Burwell	1812	2nd term
Prescott	John McDonell	1816	1st term
Prince Edward except Ameliasburgh Township	James Cotter	1816	1st term
Stormont & Russell	Philip VanKoughnet	1816	1st term
Wentworth	James Durand	1815	2nd term
East York & Simcoe	Peter Robinson	1816	1st term

== See also ==
- Legislative Council of Upper Canada
- Executive Council of Upper Canada
- Legislative Assembly of Upper Canada
- Lieutenant Governors of Upper Canada, 1791-1841
- Historical federal electoral districts of Canada
- List of Ontario provincial electoral districts
