= Charles Waters =

Charles Waters may refer to:

- Charles Waters (Canadian politician) (1787–1869), farmer, merchant and political figure in Upper Canada
- Charles Waters (evangelist), English banker and evangelical
- Charlie Waters (born 1948), American football player
- Charles A. Waters (1892–1972), American lawyer, judge, and politician in Pennsylvania
- Charles R. Waters, American politician from Arizona
- Charles Emerson Waters (1910–1979), American politician in Georgia
- Charles Waters (writer), American writer and poet

== See also ==
- Charles Watters (disambiguation)
- Charles Walters (disambiguation)
