= Lincoln South (Province of Canada electoral district) =

Electoral district, Legislative Assembly, Province of Canada

Lincoln South Canada West
Province of Canada electoral district

Defunct pre-Confederation electoral district
- Legislature: Legislative Assembly of the Province of Canada
- District created: 1841
- District abolished: 1867
- First contested: 1841
- Last contested: 1863

Lincoln South was an electoral district of the Legislative Assembly of the Parliament of the Province of Canada, in Canada West (now Ontario). It was created in 1841, upon the establishment of the Province of Canada by the union of Upper Canada and Lower Canada. Lincoln South was represented by one member in the Legislative Assembly. It was amalgamated prior to the election of 1848.

== Boundaries ==
Lincoln South electoral district was located in the southern portion of the Niagara Peninsula (now in the Regional Municipality of Niagara).

The Union Act, 1840 had merged the two provinces of Upper Canada and Lower Canada into the Province of Canada, with a single Parliament. The separate parliaments of Lower Canada and Upper Canada were abolished. The Union Act provided that the pre-existing electoral boundaries of Upper Canada would continue to be used in the new Parliament, unless altered by the Union Act itself.

Lincoln County was one of the electoral districts which was altered by the Union Act. When originally created in 1792, Lincoln County had been composed of four ridings, each sending a member to the Upper Canada Legislative Assembly. The Union Act instead split Lincoln County into two separate electoral districts, each containing two of the former ridings.

The Union Act defined Lincoln South as follows:

15. And be it enacted, That the County of Lincoln in the Province of Upper Canada shall be divided into Two Ridings, to be called respectively the North Riding and the South Riding; and that the North Riding shall be formed by uniting the First Riding and Second Riding of the said County, and the South Riding by uniting the Third Riding and Fourth Riding of the said County; and that the North and South Riding of the last-mentioned County shall each be represented by One Member in the Legislative Assembly of the Province of Canada.

The boundaries of the third and fourth ridings of Luncoln County had originally been set out by a proclamation of the first Lieutenant Governor of Upper Canada, John Graves Simcoe, in 1792:

That the fifteenth of the said counties be hereafter called by the name of the county of Lincoln; which county is to be divided into four ridings. ... The third riding is to be bounded on the east by the river Niagara, on the south by the Chippawa or Welland, on the west by the easternmost boundary of the first riding, and on the north by the southern boundary of the second riding. The fourth riding is to be bounded on the east by the river Niagara, on the south by lake Erie, to the north of the Grand river or Ouse, thence up the said river to the road leading from the said Grand river or Ouse to the forks of the Chippawa or Welland, and on the north by the said road until it strikes the forks of the Welland, thence down the said Welland to the river Niagara; the said fourth riding to include the islands comprised within the easternmost boundaries of the river Niagara.

The boundaries of the third and fourth ridings had been further defined by a statute of Upper Canada in 1798:

29. And be it further enacted by the authority aforesaid, That the townships of Stamford, Thorold and Pelham, do constitute and form the third Riding of the County of Lincoln.

30. And be it further enacted by the authority aforesaid, That the townships of Bertie, Willoughby, Crowland, Humberstone and Wainfleet, do constitute and form the fourth Riding of the County of Lincoln.

Those boundaries were used until Lincoln South was amalgamated prior to the 1848 election.

== Members of the Legislative Assembly ==
Lincoln South was represented by one member in the Legislative Assembly. The following were the members for Lincoln South.

Parliament	Years	Members	Party
1st Parliament; 1841–1844	1841–1844	David Thorburn	Unionist; moderate Reformer

== Abolition ==
The electoral district was amalgamated prior to the election of 1848.
