= Donald Macdonell =

Donald Macdonell or MacDonell may refer to:

- Donald Macdonell (Upper Canada politician) (1778–1861), political figure in Upper Canada
- Donald Macdonell (Australian politician) (1862–1911), Australian politician
- Donald MacDonell (RAF officer) (1913–1999), Scottish flying ace of the Second World War
- Donald Greenfield MacDonell (1849–1916), lawyer and political figure in Ontario, Canada
- Donald Æneas MacDonell (1794–1879), soldier and political figure in Upper Canada
