= Alexander Macdonell of Greenfield =

Canadian politician and businessman (1782–1835)

Member of the 8th and 9th Legislative Assembly of Upper Canada for Glengarry
- In office January 31, 1821 – June 24, 1828
- Preceded by: John Cameron
- Succeeded by: Alexander Fraser

Member of the 12th Legislative Assembly of Upper Canada for Prescott
- In office January 15, 1835 – February 23, 1835
- Preceded by: Donald Macdonell
- Succeeded by: John Chesser

Sheriff of the Ottawa District
- In office 1822 – February 23, 1835

Personal details
- Born: November 20, 1782 Greenfield, near Aberchalder, in Inverness-shire, Scotland
- Died: February 23, 1835 (aged 52) Toronto, Canada West
- Spouse: Suzette/Josephte (Cree)
- Relations: Miles Macdonell, cousin and brother-in-law John Macdonell, brother Donald Macdonell, brother
- Children: Captain George Macdonell of Greenfield, Q.C., M.P. for Dundas County; Lieutenant Angus John Macdonell of Greenfield; John Macdonell of Greenfield; Margaret Macdonell of Greenfield.

Alexander Macdonell of Greenfield (20 November 1782 – 23 February 1835) was a Canadian businessman and politician. He was the fourth son of Alexander Macdonell of Greenfield and Janet Macdonell of Aberchalder (a sister of John Macdonell of Aberchalder and Sir Hugh MacDonell of Aberchalder). He was also the cousin and brother-in-law of Miles MacDonell, the first governor of the Red River Colony.

Alexander worked as a fur trader and became a partner of the North West Company becoming very interested in the rights of the Métis (so called "Half Breeds") with whom he worked as well as having 4 métis children. He was the first to refer to the Métis as becoming a nation when he wrote to Duncan Cameron that “The New Nation under their leaders are coming forward to clear their native soil of intruders and assassins”. Additionally Alexander played a role in the development of Métis identity by "giving them shape and direction". Alongside Cameron he was also instrumental in Cuthbert Grant initially being appointed as one of the "captains of the Métis", and eventually “Captain-General of all the Half-Breeds.” According to writer George Woodcock, prior to 1814 there was nothing to suggest that Grant saw the Métis as a nation, or gave any thought to their cause, or even identified himself with them. During the Pemmican War Alexander dispatched Cuthbert Grant and 25 Métis to plunder the Hudson's Bay Company's Brandon House.

It is a common story that Macdonell gave the Métis flag to the Métis in 1815. However, this is based on a reading of one account, provided by James Sutherland, in which he stated “it is said” that the North West Company gave the Métis peoples the Métis flag as a gift for their actions against the Red River Colony in Spring 1815, but made no mention of Macdonell as the source of the flag. However, there is no corroborating evidence and it is potentially contradicted by contemporary eyewitness accounts from Colin Robertson, Lieutenant General Sir John Coape Sherbrooke, and Macdonell himself that do not describe a flag being given among the gifts given to the Métis by the North West Company before the flag was first recorded by Sutherland as being flown in October 1815. All other historical contemporary accounts of the flag do not include details of where the flag originated. Moreover, Métis oral tradition tells that the Métis developed the infinity flag for themselves, and called the flag Li Paviiyoon di Michif in the Michif language.

In 1819 a book titled A Narrative of the Transactions in the Red River Country from the commencement of the operations of the Earl of Selkirk till the summer of 1816 was published in London, United Kingdom under his name.

In 1821, following the forced merger of the North West Company with the Hudson's Bay Company, Alexander returned to Upper Canada, becoming a political figure. He served in the 8th Parliament of Upper Canada and 9th Parliament of Upper Canada in the riding of Glengarry and in the 12th Parliament in the riding of Prescott.

Another Alexander Macdonell also served in the riding of Glengarry during several parliaments, including the 6th Parliament; he succeeded Alexander MacDonell of Greenfield's brother, John MacDonell.

In 1822 Alexander became the Sheriff of the Ottawa District, a position he held until his death in 1835.

Through his daughter Margaret he is a great-great-grandfather of Métis Elder George R. D. Goulet.
