= Caughnawaga =

Caughnawaga or Kahnawake may refer to:

- Caughnawaga Indian Village Site, a village of the Mohawk nation inhabited from 1666 to 1693, now an archaeological site near the village of Fonda, New York
- Caughnawaga, New York, a town in Montgomery County eliminated by subdivision in 1793
- Caughnawaga Indians, Native Americans who converted to Christianity
- Kahnawake 14, Quebec, Mohawk reserve south of the St. Lawrence River and Montreal
