= Tayler =

Tayler is a surname and given name, and may refer to:

== Given name ==
- Tayler Hill (born 1990), American basketball player
- Tayler Holder (born 1997), American TikTok star
- Tayler Malsam (born 1989), American professional stock car racing driver
- Tayler Saucedo (born 1993), American baseball player
- Tayler Scott (born 1992), South African born American baseball player

== Surname ==
- Tayler (surname)
