= Métis flag =

- Use: Blue version
- Adopted: 1816
- Design: Infinity symbol on a blue background
- Use: Red version
- Adopted: 1815
- Design: Infinity symbol on a red background

The Métis flag was first used by Métis resistance fighters in Rupert's Land before the 1816 Battle of Seven Oaks. According to only one contemporary account, the flag was "said to be" a gift from the North West Company in 1815, but no other surviving accounts confirm this. Both the red and blue versions of the flag have been used to represent the political and military force of the Métis since that time. The Métis flag predates the Flag of Canada by at least 150 years, and is the oldest patriotic flag that is indigenous to Canada.

The blue background flag has been accepted by the Métis National Council as the official flag of the Métis Nation. In 2013, the Métis National Council secured an official mark for the flag to protect it as a symbol of the Métis Nation, and ensure its collective ownership by citizens of the Métis Nation.

== Adoption of the flag in modern times ==
The first flag of the Métis was long forgotten among the other flags adopted and flown by the Métis at various points of their political and national growth. In the mid 1970s, the Métis flag being flown by the Native Council of Canada had a green background, and on the flag was a ring of alternating shamrocks and fleur-de-lys around a bison. However, there was friction due to difference of opinions between the Métis Society of Saskatchewan and the Native Council of Canada, and this friction helped to spur the debate about whether there was a historic Métis flag that they should be using. A consultant was tasked by the Métis Society of Saskatchewan board of directors to research and present on historic flags used by Métis. There was debate about which flag to adopt, and especially the red or blue infinity flag, and the Métis Society of Saskatchewan board chose the blue version. The red and blue versions were subsequently adopted by other Métis governments across Western Canada.

== Design and symbolism ==
The flag shows a white infinity symbol on a field of either blue or red. There are many interpretations of what the colours and symbol mean.

Several origins and meanings have been suggested for the infinity symbol flag:

- The faith that Métis culture shall live on forever
- The mixing of the European immigrants and the First Nations peoples, with the two conjoined circles symbolizing the unity of two cultures.
- There might be a connection to the ouroboros, an ancient symbol that depicts a serpent or dragon eating its own tail, represented either in a circle or figure eight, symbolizing renewal and rebirth.
- Another possible interpretation of the infinity symbol is that it relates to traditional Métis and French Canadian dances, such as the quadrille, in which dancers move in a figure-eight pattern.
- There might also be a connection to Celtic knotwork and Scottish influences that include Celtic knots, figure of eight in Scottish country dance, jewellery, etc.
- Others have suggested that the symbol is derived from the Plains First Nations Sign Language for Métis (reported as the symbol for "cart" combined with the symbol for "Man" in reference to the Métis' use of the Red River cart), with the symbol for cart being formed by joining the thumb and forefingers on each hand with the hands held together to form two circles.

There is debate about the historical interpretations of the colours of the Métis flags.

- Some claim that the red background represents the colours of the Hudson's Bay Company and that the blue background represents the North West Company, (though both the Hudson's Bay Company and the North West Company flew red flags that were a modification of the Red Ensign).
- Others argue that the blue flag represents the francophone Métis and the red flag represents the anglophone Métis.
- Still others argue that the blue and white combination is based on both the Flag of Scotland, and the traditional colours of Quebec.
- And yet others have said that the red flag is for Manitoba and the Northwest Territory Métis, and the blue is for the Saskatchewan Métis (despite the first recorded sighting of the red flag in what is now Saskatchewan and the blue flag first being recorded in what is now Manitoba).
- Another explanation for the colours of the flags is that they depend on how the flag is being used. Some argue that the red flag is the Métis Hunting Flag, letting the people around know that they were a hunting party and not a group going to war, and the guide for the day would be the flag-bearer. Due to the potential for skirmishes and battles on the bison hunting trips, such as the Battle of Grand Coteau, the red flag could serve as a standard.
- Some have also suggested that the flag started out as someone's attempt to design a flag for the Métis, and was putting out feelers to trial a design, which is why there are both red and blue flags with the common feature being the white infinity symbol.

The difficulty in knowing the accurate history of the origin of the flag and potential interpretations of the symbolism is that there are no known records that accurately describe the origin of the flag in a first-hand account or other written records of its creation.

== Alternative hypothesis on the colours of the flag ==
Prominent Métis lawyer, historian, and author Jean Teillet argues that the story of the origin of the Métis flag is an urban myth. Of the first three historic accounts of the Métis flag, only James Sutherland attributed the flag as a gift from the North West Company, based on rumours that he was told, and she argues for an exercise of caution in taking it as fact. Teillet and others argue that the Métis had a more active role in the origin of the flag, rather than being passive recipients of the flag or being manipulated by the North West Company.

In 1815, popular fabrics in tradings posts that were available were calico, corduroy, plaid, and stroud. Stroud, a woollen, felt-like, broadcloth commonly used in making coats, was the only suitable material available for making flags. The common colours that were available at the time were green, red, and blue. Teillet asserts that as a matter of practicality, the Métis would have used the material that was available to them for making flags. When they needed to make a new flag, they purchased the material that was available, and if red was not available, they might have chosen to use blue instead. Rather than being a strategic ideological decision to align colours with particular trading companies, her assertion is that the colour was a reaction to what was practical in that time and location.

Until somebody shows me evidence of it I will stand firmly on my line, which is don't repeat that story. Just don't repeat it and have some faith in your own people that they have the intelligence enough to come up with their own ideas and don't attribute everything to everybody else.

— Jean Teillet, Windspeaker.com, Battlefords News-Optimist

== History ==
Originally, the flags that would have been flown in Rupert's Land and across the North-Western Territory were the Hudson's Bay Company flag and North West Company flag, respectively, and the Union Jack.

Métis oral tradition tells that the Métis developed the infinity flag for themselves, and called the flag Li Paviiyoon di Michif in the Michif language. Some people tell a story that Alexander Macdonell of Greenfield gifted the Métis employed by the North West Company a flag in 1814, helping to create the Métis Nation, but there are no records that directly confirm this version of events, and some that potentially contradict this story.

=== James Sutherland's accounts of the Métis flag ===
The flag was first reported by James Sutherland in 1815 as red with an infinity symbol, and that it was being flown by Cuthbert Grant at Fort John in the Qu'Appelle area when a Hudson's Bay Company crew were rebuilding Fort Qu'Appelle (not to be confused with Fort Qu'Appelle, Saskatchewan built in 1864). In his account, Sutherland reported that the flag was said to be a gift from the North West Company given in early 1815, but provided no evidence to confirm this origin story for the flag nor did he state that it was a gift from Alexander Macdonell of Greenfield. The events reported in this account happened prior to Sutherland's arrival at Qu'Appelle on December 8, 1815, so were conveyed to him by Hudson's Bay Company Officer John Richards McKay and his party, who had arrived there in early October 1815 and had witnessed the events described.

... Alexander M^{c}Donell partner of the N.W.C^{o}. arrived with a great parade of 40 or 50 Canadians, Freemen & Half-Breeds forming two distinct companies. M^{c}Donell led one of these consisting of Canadians with the Colours flying the other Company were Half Breeds headed by Cuthbert Grant a Half Breed who has been regularly educated at Canada and has acted for several years as Clerk & still continue to act as such, to the N.W.C^{o}. This Tribe had another Flag hoisted of what nation I know not it is red with a figure of 8 placed horizontally on the middle and it is said to be a present from the N.W.C^{o}. along with some Swords and a few pairs of Pistols to these deluded young men the Half Breeds as a recompence for their exertions against the Colony Spring 1815 and as an incentive to encourage them to further mischief this ensuing season ...

— James Sutherland, Selkirk Papers, Narrative of James Sutherland, P.A.C., MG19E1, vol. 5, pp. 1946–47.

Sutherland would also describe his first time seeing the flag at the arrival of John McDonald from Swan River in early 1816, though he did not provide an additional description of the flag.

Soon after Cameron returned to the Forks John M^{c}Donald of Swan River came on a visit & on his arrival two Flags were hoisted that is the N.W.Cos. Flag as the Flag Staff & the Half Breeds flag on a pole errected the top of their Bastion this was the first time they had shown the Half Breed Flag since my arrival indicated something.

— James Sutherland, Selkirk Papers, Narrative of James Sutherland, P.A.C., MG19E1, vol. 5, pp. 1950.

Sutherland also discussed what he had been told about why the flag was flying.

However, we heard no more of the business for two or three days at this time the Canadians were in a state of intoxication. One old Canadian who was attached to us came to our house in this state. I put many Questions to him concerning what was going on at the N.W. House & what was the reason for hoisting the Half Breed flag he said I would know that before Summer came, that every thing bad against us & the Colony were in agitation. The flag was flying in honour of Cuthbert Grant having been appointed Captain General of all the Half Breeds in the Country and likewise as a rejoicing for the news brought by Swan River M^{c}Donald that the Half Breeds in Athabasca English River, Saskatchewan & Swan River were collecting under their several chiefs & had sent information that they would all join Grant Early in the Spring to sweep Red River of all the English.

— James Sutherland, Selkirk Papers, Narrative of James Sutherland, P.A.C., MG19E1, vol. 5, pp. 1951.

Sutherland's account of these events was written sometime after the events and based on his memory, as he had destroyed his papers to prevent them from being taken by the North West Company.

=== Potential contradictions of James Sutherland's account of the Métis flag as a gift ===
However, the assertion that the flag was a gift for the Métis from Alexander Macdonell of Greenfield and the North West Company is potentially contradicted by other accounts of gifts being given to the Métis by the North West Company and people they employed, in which the accounts do not mention of the flag among other gifts being given.

A potential contradiction of Sutherland's suggestion that the flag may have been a gift is found in an account of gifts being given to the Métis by the North West Company on June 28, 1815, at Fort William. The gifts, which included two swords, were given for the actions of the Métis against the Red River Colony, but there is no mention of a flag being gifted to the Métis.

As respects the partners of the North West Company, whatever doubt may exist as to their being accessaries to the present and other offences before the fact, there can be little or none of many of them having become so afterwards; as also that they were thanked publicly for the services rendered the company, a feast prepared for them, and a suit of clothes given to each, and swords to two (Bostonois and Antoine Houle) who are in the regular employment of the North West Company and chiefs of their own party. Amongst the partners present on this occasion at Fort William, the following only are named; viz. Simon M^{c}Gillvray (of London), Archibald N. M^{c}Leod, Duncan Cameron, Alexander M^{c}Donnell, Alexander M^{c}Kenzie, Kenneth M^{c}Kenzie and John M^{c}Donald of Fort Dauphin, although probably many others were there at the time, as Daniel M^{c}Kenzie acknowledges of himself in his letter before-mentioned.

— Lieutenant General Sir John Coape Sherbrooke, Papers Relating to the Red River Settlement.

Colin Robertson (then employed by the Hudson's Bay Company) describes gifts being given to the Métis at Fort Gibraltar in his journal entry from September 15, 1815 at Fort Douglas, but there is no mention of a flag being given by Macdonnell among the other presents given by Duncan Cameron to the Métis for their activity against the Colony in Spring 1815 (Macdonell and Cameron had arrived at Fort Gibraltar on two days before on September 13, 1815).

The Metifś and Freemen were called into the Hall of the North West Company's Fort, commonly termed Gibraltar or Forks, where Cameron made a long speech praising their values and independent spirit, in driving away those that came to enslave them, and threw out some sarcastic remarks on myself, but unfortunately for him his presents, which consisted for 6 Gallons of Shrub and forty pounds of Plug tobacco, excited such discontent, that one half of his audience left the room before the harangue was finished, and came over to my house. When things were in this state at Gibraltar, I sent over M^{r} M^{c}Lean and Geo Yearns to claim some horses belonging to the Settlement. On M^{r} M^{c}Lean's arrival he demanded an interview with M^{r} A. M^{c}Donnell and Seraphim, when he asked them if they had given away his two horses to Marcella's Son. M^{r} A. M^{c}Donnell turned around to Seraphim and asked him, did you ever hear Marcella's Son say that I gave him the Horses. Yes Oh! I remember says M^{r} M^{c}Donnell that I said to the Halfbreeds in general "my lads all the Horses are certainly yours". Cameron came forward, and said, he would take his Bible Oath that he never said so, but he presumed the Halfbreeds considered the Horses as free booty, however, it appeared clear to me that the North West Company had given the Colonial Horses, Dogs, &c to the Metifś as payment for the active part they took in the affairs of last spring, so I shall act upon this in my attempt to disunite the Metifś and the North West Company.

— Colin Robertson, Colin Robertson diary, 1 July 1815 – 30 November 1815 pp. 211–2.

Robertson also recorded details reported to him of a speech and gifts by Cameron upon Cameron's arrival in the Fall of 1814, and the gifts did not include a flag.

Rode out this morning with Meſs^{rs}. Pambrun et Nolin, met with Cameron in his uniform, attended by Seraphim & Pangman. The Captain wished to be polite, but I mean to keep him at arms length until I bring him to a sense of his duty, a few of the Freemen called on me to day, and one of the them who appeared to be a good meaning and rather an intelligent fellow, gave me the heads of Cameron's speech on his arrive in the Fall of 1814. when the destruction of the Colony was resolved on at Fort Williams, after his arrival he sent for all of the Freemen and Metifś, within one or two days march of his Fort, some of the most credulous of them, he ordered in the name of the King, when he had aſsembled them in his Hall at Fort Gibraltar, he placed before them a Keg of Rum and half a roll of Tobacco, and addressed them in the following terms:

"My friends you are aware of the continuation of the war with America, and that an old Friend M^{r} W M^{c}Kay is appointed a Colonel in the Army, he intends to attack the Americans at Prairie des Chien, should he not find them there, it is his intention to come here, for reinforcements. I therefore expect you will render him every aſsistance, but in the first place you must aſsist me in driving away the Colonists. If they are not driven away the consequences will be, that they will prevent you from hunting and by that means starve your families, for the truth of what I aſsert; here is a proclamation, forbidding you on pain of death to kill food for your children."

Here Seraphim, read that unfortunate edict of Capt^{n} M^{c}Donnells

"You hear my friends, continued Cameron, what he says, who gave him a right to the soil? by and bye he will be claiming your private property? will you be slaves? will you allow this man who calls himself Governor to put his foot upon your neck? Join me, and resist such acts of Tyranny! I would beg to inform you that I am appointed commanding Officer of Red River by an order of Sir George Prevosts the Governor of Canada and I still expect higher promotion, but even at present I have authority to bring such Freemen to Montreal to be tried for disobedience of orders." A person of the name of Lavemdom [?] observed "that if the Americans came to Red River and that he was commanded in the name of the King, he would certainly take up arms against them, but he conceived the Colonists to be British Subjects like himself and would not take up arms against them, indeed (continued this man) "before the Colonists came here I was clothed in leather, but now I am comfortable, and myself and family have plenty of both Cloth and Blankets."

Cameron felt extremely indignant at his remark, Lavemdom [?] then took up his hat and left the room, he was soon followed by a number of others, who refused the presents which Cameron had laid out for them. I am greatly astonished that these proceedings of Cameron did not put Capt^{n} M^{c}Donnell on his guard, or induce him to take some steps to counter the views of the North West Company.

— Colin Robertson, Colin Robertson diary, 1 July 1815 – 30 November 1815 pp. 218–220.

Further to potential contradictions of Sutherland's account of the flag being a gift is a dismissal of rumours about Duncan Cameron's gifts to the Métis and the use of the Métis as a militia of the North West Company that was written by Alexander Macdonell of Greenfield in his book A Narrative of Transactions in the Red River Country in 1819. In this book, Macdonell does not mention himself or others gifting a flag to the Métis.

It has been falsely asserted, that the Bois-brulés were paraded and exercised in arms under the immediate inspection of Duncan Cameron. Mr. Cameron had only two Bois-brulés, Bostonnois Pangman and a boy, wintering with him: but there was a Camp of Bois-brulés and Canadian hunters at Pembina River, winter 1815, assembled as usual at that season for the collection of provisions, against whom Miles M^{c}Donell marched with a body of armed men, intending to possess himself of the produce of their hunt; but on his near approach, they called in their stragglers, and put themselves in a posture to receive the Governor, which astonished the party, and caused him to retreat to his government-house at Fort Daer; and to this attempt, may principally be attributed to the part which the Bois-brulés in general afterwards took against him and the Colonists.

— Alexander Macdonell of Greenfield, A Narrative of Transactions in the Red River Country: From the commencement of the operations of the Earl of Selkirk, till the summer of the year 1816.

Macdonell also mentioned a general meeting that occurred at Fort William in 1815, but again he did not discuss a flag being given to the Métis.

At the succeeding general meeting at Fort William, Mr. Cameron was, unfortunately for himself, reinstated in his joint charge of the Red River district; but he had positive injunctions from his Partners to be guarded, cautious, and prudent, and to avoid all collision with his Lordship's Agents and Settlers; and it was found expedient that I should conduct the provision posts of Upper Red River as usual.

— Alexander Macdonell of Greenfield, A Narrative of Transactions in the Red River Country: From the commencement of the operations of the Earl of Selkirk, till the summer of the year 1816.

=== Peter Fidler's accounts of the Métis flag ===
Peter Fidler first reported a red Métis flag with an infinity symbol around March 12, 1816, on the Qu'Appelle River, and said that it had been see the previous fall, which corroborated Sutherland's account of John McDonald's visit to Qu'Appelle. Fidler reported a rumour that he had heard that the North West Company was trying to direct the Métis to action against the Hudson's Bay Company and the newly established Red River Colony (the support was not unanimous among the Métis), but he did not attribute the flag to being a gift to the Métis.

About the 12th of March, the Canadian Northern Express arrived at River Qu'Appelle, accompanied by M^{r}. Jn. M^{c}Donald a partner of the N.W.C^{o}. of the Swan River Department,— The Canadian and half-Breeds were liberally supplied with rum & was kept in a state of intoxication for two days — The day after the N.W.C^{o}. Express arrived their flag was hoisted on the flag-staff, & a flag of the half-Breeds on the new Bastion. — The flag of the half-Breeds is about 4 1/2 feet square, red & in the middle is a large figure of Eight horizontally of a different colour. This flag was first displayed to the view of HBC^{o} people last fall on the arrival of Mr. Alex^{r} M^{c}Donell from the Forks, followed by the halfbreeds & freemen; at the same time the N.W.C^{o}. flag was hoisted & followed by M^{c}Donell and all the Canadian Servants on their arrival at River qu'appelle house. The day after it was hoisted Polly, an old servant of the N.W.C^{o}. & their Batteau builders came over to Mr. Sutherland on a visit in a private manner, who asked him the meaning of the half-Breeds flag being hoisted, a thing he had never before seen, he very emphatically replied that "before he left the River he would know it" — he was shortly after acquainted in a private manner that the half-Breeds had been directed by the N.W.C^{o}. all to assemble at that place early in May, & that it was the intention of the N.W.C^{o}. not only to root up the Colony but to seize all the Pemmican &c. belonging to the HBC^{o}. — In consequence of hearing these alarming accounts M^{r}. Sutherland sent down an Express to the Colony sometime afterwards for a re-inforcement of armed men to assist in protecting the HBC^{o}. property, on their passage down the River when the Ice permitted the Navigation; & M^{r}. Pambrun & 10 men was sent up from the Forks, & 6 from Brandon House for that purpose. — Reports were also current that the Servants of the HBC^{o}. should all be driven from the Red River. — M^{r}. Cuthbert Grant, a Clerk to the N.W.C^{o}. at River Qu'Appelle, a half-Breed is appointed to act as Commander-in-Chief over all the half-Breeds.

— Peter Fidler, Selkirk Papers, Narrative of Peter Fidler, P.A.C., MG19E1, vol. 6, pp. 2515.

On June 1, 1816, Peter Fidler recorded in his Brandon House Journal that the Métis, under the leadership of Cuthbert Grant, were flying the blue flag with an infinity symbol when they attacked the Hudson's Bay Company's Brandon House, mere weeks before the Battle of Seven Oaks that happened on June 19, 1816. The reason for the change in the colour of the flag is not known, and Fidler did not provide information about the origin of the flag. In his narrative of the events to Lord Selkirk, Fidler did not report the changed colour, stating only that the flag was present.

Saturday, at 1/2 past noon about 48 Half Breed, Canadians, Freemen & Indians came all riding on horseback, with their Flag flying blue about 4 feet square & a figure of 8 horizontally in the middle one Beating an Indian Drum, and many of them singing Indian Songs, they all rode directly to the usual croſing place over the river where they all stopped about two minutes, and instead of going down the Bank & riding acroſ the River, they all turned suddenly around and rode full speed into our yard — some of them tyed their horses, others loose fixed their flag at our Door, which they soon afterwards hoisted over our East Gate next to the Canadian House. Cuthbert Grant then came up to me in the yard & demanded of me to deliver to him all the keys of our Stores, Warehouses, &. I of course would not deliver them up — They then rushed into the House and broke open the Warehouse Door first, plundered the Warehouse of every article it contained, tore up part of the Cellar floor, & cut out the Parchment windows without saying for what this was done for or by whose Authority — Alex^{r} M^{c}Donell Seraphim, Bostonois, & Allan M^{c}Donell were at their house looking on the whole time

— Peter Fidler, Brandon House post journal.

== Other flags used by the Métis ==
=== Legislative Assembly of Assiniboia ===
The provisional government, the Legislative Assembly of Assiniboia, established by the Métis under Louis Riel on December 8, 1869, flew a flag. There are numerous descriptions of the flag that was flown by the provisional government:

- A fleur-de-lis and shamrock on a white background
- A golden fleur-de-lis on a white background
- A golden fleur-de-lis with a black border on a white background
- A fleur-de-lis, shamrock, and small bison on the fly on a white background
- Three fleur-de-lis across the top and a shamrock in the centre of the bottom edge on a white background
- A fleur-de-lis and a shamrock with a large bison on the lower part on a white background
- A fleur-de-lis with a small bison in one corner on a white background
- A blue fleur-de-lis with a green harp and shamrock on a white background with a gold border
- Three crosses: a large scarlet-coloured cross in the centre, flanked by two smaller gold crosses; on a white background with a gold border
- A ring of fleur-de-lis and shamrocks arranged around a bison on a white background.
- A ring of fleur-de-lis and shamrocks arranged around a bison on a green background.

=== Provisional government of Saskatchewan ===
The provisional government was established by Louis Riel at Batoche on March 19, 1885. There were at least two flags used by the provisional government. The first was described as:

Louis Riel raised the standard the day before St. Joseph's Day [March 18], calling the revolt the holiest of actions and placing it under the protection of St. Joseph and Our Lady of Lourdes. As a flag he chose the white flag of ancient France [with a royal blue shield bearing three golden fleurs de lys], saying that he was called to renew its ancient glories. On it he placed a large image of Mary's immaculate heart.

— Father Vital Fourmond,

Riel also flew a personal banner at Batoche, which some sources say was the main flag of the Métis at Batoche and used as a battle standard. The flag consisted of an image of Notre Dame de Lourdes on one side and an inscription at the bottom that lists family members and a poem to Our Lady, and the reverse side contained poetry of a similar theme. The Roman Catholic priests expressed concern during the Battle of Batoche that if they raised a white peace flag to signal to the Canadian forces to stop firing on the church and rectory that the white flag would be confused for Riel's white emblazoned flag and would attract shots and shelling from the troops, but white flag was recognized and respected.

During the Battle of Batoche, Gabriel Dumont reported "on Baker's house [on the West side of the river] ... flew a flag of the Blessed Virgin. Another flag of Our Lord was in the midst of [Batoche], on the Council's house." It was reported by witnesses that a flag was flying above a small building at the centre of Batoche that was used as the Council's chamber and located next to Xavier Letendre dit Batoche's house that was used as a headquarters, but these reports did not provide a description of this flag other than it was white and emblazoned.

There is a claim that there was a Métis Battle Standard used at the Battle of Batoche that is described as being a blue background, with a wolf's head and hand (palm outward) in the middle, and a banner with the Michif words "maisons ... autels ... Surtout Liberté" (literally translated, this means "homes, altars, above all liberty"). This flag was said to have been created by the Métis women at Batoche to encourage the men in the battle. However, the earliest known reference to this flag is a hand-drawn picture from 1975.

== See also ==
- Métis buffalo hunt
- Métis in Canada
- Métis in the United States
- Métis in Manitoba
