= Robinson baronets of Toronto (1854) =

Baronetcy in the Baronetage of the United Kingdom

Robinson baronets
- Escutcheon of the Robinson Baronets of Toronto
- Creation date: 1854
- Status: dormant
- Motto: Propere et provide, Quickly and cautiously

The Robinson Baronetcy, of Toronto in Canada, was created in the Baronetage of the United Kingdom on 21 September 1854 for the Canadian lawyer and politician John Robinson.

== Background ==
The 1st baronet was a descendant of Christopher Robinson, originally of Cleasby, Yorkshire. Christopher Robinson emigrated to Virginia in 1670; he was the elder brother of The Right Reverend John Robinson, Bishop of Bristol and Bishop of London.

== Robinson baronets, of Toronto (1854) ==
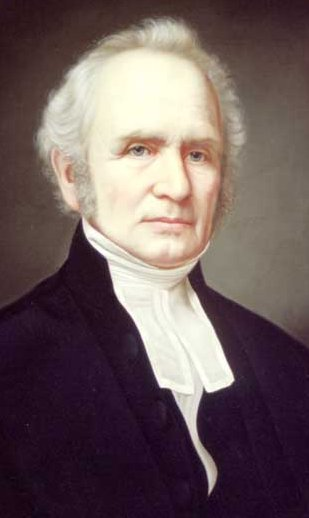
Sir John Robinson, 1st Baronet, of Toronto

- Sir John Beverley Robinson, 1st Baronet (1791–1863)
- Sir James Lukin Robinson, 2nd Baronet (1818–1894)
- Sir Frederick Arnold Robinson, 3rd Baronet (1855–1901)
- Sir John Beverley Beverley Robinson, 4th Baronet (1848–1933)
- Sir John Beverley Robinson, 5th Baronet (1895–1948)
- Sir John Beverley Robinson, 6th Baronet (1885–1954)
- Sir John Beverley Robinson, 7th Baronet (1913–1988)
- Christopher Philipse Robinson, presumed 8th Baronet (born 1938). As of 2021 he has not successfully proven his succession and is therefore not on the Official Roll of the Baronetage, with the baronetcy considered dormant since 1988.

The presumed heir apparent to the baronetcy is Peter Duncan Robinson (born 1967), eldest surviving son of the presumed 8th baronet.

== Line of Succession ==
- Sir John Beverley Robinson, 1st Baronet (1791-1863)
  - Sir James Lukin Robinson, 2nd Baronet (1818-1896)
    - Henry Grassett Robinson (1849-1869)
    - Sir Frederick Arnold Robinson, 3rd Baronet (1855-1901)
  - John Beverley Robinson (1821-1896)
    - Sir John Beverley Robinson, 4th Baronet (1848-1933)
      - Sir John Beverley Robinson, 5th Baronet (1895-1948)
    - Christopher Conway Robinson (1853-1907)
      - Sir John Beverley Robinson, 6th Baronet (1885-1954)
        - Sir John Beverley Robinson, 7th Baronet (1913-1988)
      - Norman Macleod Beverley Robinson (1887-1949)
  - Christopher Robinson (1828-1905)
    - Christopher Charles Robinson (1883-1948)
      - Christopher Robinson (1909-19??)
        - Sir Christopher Philipse Robinson, 8th Baronet (b. 1938)
          - (1) Peter Duncan Robinson (b. 1967)
            - (2) Benjamin Patrick Robinson (b. 2001)
            - (3) Samuel McGill Robinson (b. 2003)
        - (4) Walter Gherardi Robinson (b. 1940)
        - (5) John Mowat Robinson (b. 1942)
          - (6) Graeme Harrod Robinson (b. 1970)
          - (7) Christopher Mowat Robinson (b. 1972)
      - Peter Beverley Robinson (1915-1992)
        - (8) Kenneth Beverley Robinson (b. 1967)
      - Hugh Lukin Robinson (1916-2012)
        - (9) John Michael Robinson (b. 1946)
        - (10) David Lukin Robinson (b. 1952)
          - (11) Christopher Robinson (b. 1994)
          - (12) Peter Robinson (b. 1997)
    - John Beverley Robinson (1884-1954)
      - John Beverley Robinson (1922-2006)
        - (13) Bruce Beverley Robinson (b. 1952)
        - (14) Christopher Charles (b. 1957)
    - Duncan Strachan Robinson (1886-1956)
      - Duncan Gordon Strachan Robinson (1917-1982)
        - Unknown at this point if any further male issue is living in this line
      - John Attrachay Strachan Robinson (1920-1970)
        - There is issue in this line. It is unknown as to whether there is any male line issue.

== Extended family ==
Sir Charles Walker Robinson (1836–1924), fourth son of the first Baronet, was a Major-General in the Canadian Army.

== See also ==
- Robinson baronets
