= Gilbert McMicking =

Gilbert McMicking may refer to:

- Gilbert McMicking (Canadian politician) (1790–?), businessman and political figure in Upper Canada
- Gilbert McMicking (British politician) (1862–1942), Scottish Liberal Member of Parliament, 1910–1922
