= James Thorburn (physician) =

Canadian physician, medical researcher, military surgeon

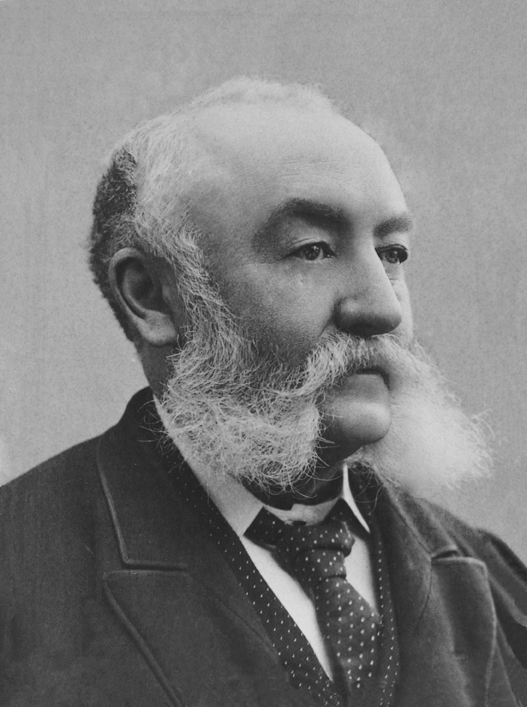
James Thorburn, Canadian physician and a president of the Canadian Medical Association

James Thorburn (21 November 1830 – 26 May 1905) was a Canadian physician, medical researcher, military surgeon, university professor and an executive member of several medical organizations.

== Biography ==
Born in Queenston, Upper Canada, Thorburn was the son of David Thorburn (1790–1862), a parliamentary member for Lincoln County, Upper Canada for many years. The younger Thorburn received his education at the University of Toronto, where he graduated as a physician in 1855, and at the University of Edinburgh, where he studied pharmacology.

Thorburn became a medical doctor in Toronto, Ontario, a Surgeon-Major in the Queen's Own Rifles militia and also a professor of pharmacology and therapeutics at the University of Toronto. He was a consulting surgeon at the Toronto General Hospital and a physician of the Boys' Home and the Hospital for Sick Children. He was also connected with other institutions, both charitable and financial, in his capacity as a physician.

Thorburn contributed approximately 400 articles on medicine and other subjects to journals, and wrote and published the Manual of Life Insurance Examination (Toronto, 1887) and Life Insurance and the Relations Existing Between It and Medical Men. He was elected to the presidency of the Canadian Medical Association in 1895 and represented the association at its annual meeting in Montreal, Quebec in 1896. He was also the president of the Toronto chapter of the Victorian Order of Nurses. In 1901, he was elected to the executive of the Toronto branch of the Anti-Consumption League.

== Architecture of Thorburn's practice and home ==
Thorburn's medical office, located in his personal home, was found notable in a 2008 survey by the Wellcome Trust, which noted:

Dr Thorburn's house-office of 1891 (Figure 10) ... is one of the few in the sample to include an entirely independent side entrance for patients, allowing them to enter directly into the heart of the house with no overlap whatsoever with the more private family spaces. In this case the rooms given over to medical practice were a waiting-room, a consulting room and a small laboratory, each with a window. ... It is important to note that even these early examples have generous waiting-rooms that occupy a substantial percentage of the medical practice area.

== Family and home life ==
Thorburn married Jane MacKenzie. Their son, James David Thorburn (1865–1912), married a daughter of Chief Justice Sir William Ralph Meredith of Toronto, who had also been chancellor of the University of Toronto.

Domestic Jane Roseman and cook Julia Malloy were employed and living in Thorburn's home. The home's architecture included two servants' bedrooms above the kitchen.

Other occupants in his home included Ernest McPhee, who had emigrated from England in 1900 at the age of 12. This home was one of three dwelling houses owned by Thorburn along with 600 acres (2.4 km^{2}) of real estate, as noted in the Welcome Trust survey.

== Illness, death and tributes ==
In his later life, Thorburn was appointed "Emeritus Professor of Therapeutics and Materia Medica."

Thorburn was reported suffering gravely at his home in Toronto on 26 May 1905 after a presumed heart attack, and was treated by fellow physician John Caven. He died the same day.

The first news headlining his grave condition reported "Distinguished Physician is Suffering from Heart Trouble" in a terse two-inch-column report in The Globe and Mail. Thorburn was described as "one of Toronto's most esteemed physicians." His widely printed obituary also described him as: "[possessing] many admirable qualities."

Note: this article incorporates text from the Appleton's Cyclopædia of American Biography (1889), a reference work in the public domain
