= Henry Jones (Upper Canada politician) =

Upper Canada merchant and politician

Henry Jones (1790 – January 21, 1860) was a merchant and political figure in Upper Canada. He represented Brockville in the Legislative Assembly of Upper Canada from 1830 to 1834 as a Conservative.

He was born in the United States, the son of Joseph Jones. Jones married Lucy Catherine Macdonell. He lived in Brockville. He served in the Leeds militia and was a justice of the peace for the Johnstown District. He was also postmaster for Brockville.

Jones was a cousin of Jonas and Charles Jones, who both also served in the assembly.
