= Ephraim Jones =

Upper Canada politician

Ephraim Jones (April 17, 1750 – January 24, 1812) was a soldier, judge, and political figure in Upper Canada.

He was born in Weston, Massachusetts, in 1750. His father, Elisha, and five of his brothers served with the British during the American Revolution. He was taken prisoner in the Saratoga Campaign of 1777 and later served with Edward Jessup's Loyal Rangers. He was named in the Massachusetts Banishment Act of 1778.

After the war, he settled west of the Ottawa River in the area of Augusta Township. He married Charlotte Coursolles, a French Canadian from Vercheres, Quebec, on March 4, 1779, at the Anglican Christ-Church, in Montreal. He moved to the Montreal area and became justice of the peace there in 1786.

In 1788, he became a justice of the peace in the new Lunenburgh District and received a large land grant in Augusta Township. He operated a mill and iron foundry on the Gananoque River.

Jones served on the land board for Leeds & Grenville and was a judge in the district courts. He was elected to the 1st Parliament of Upper Canada representing Grenville. He introduced a bill introducing trials by jury and supported the 1793 act prohibiting the further introduction of slaves into Upper Canada.

Jones suffered from frail health in his later years and died in Augusta Township, Leeds, Ontario, Canada, in 1812, aged 61.

His sons Jonas and Charles both served in the legislative assembly. His daughter Charlotte married Levius Peters Sherwood and his daughter Eliza married Henry John Boulton; both of these men became members of the assembly and judges. His grandson, Henry Sherwood, became Joint Premier of the Province of Canada.
