= William Crooks (Canadian politician) =

Upper Canada politician

William Crooks (August 6, 1776 – December 31, 1836) was a businessman and political figure in Upper Canada.

He was born in Kilmarnock, Scotland in 1776. In 1792, he travelled to Fort Niagara to join his brother James Crooks who was a merchant there; in 1795, the business was moved to Newark (Niagara-on-the-Lake). With his brother, he was involved in milling and a distillery. In 1800, he was named justice of the peace in the Niagara District and, in 1833, in the Gore District. Crooks served as a captain in the local militia during the War of 1812. In 1830, he was elected to the Legislative Assembly of Upper Canada for the 2nd and 3rd ridings of Lincoln. He died at Niagara in 1836.
