= John MacDonell (Revolutionary War loyalist) =

Colonel John MacDonell of Scothouse (1728-1810), also known as "Spanish John", was a Scottish Highland gentleman and Catholic military officer who emigrated to the Province of New York in 1773. He was a Loyalist in the American Revolutionary War and emigrated to Upper Canada after the war.

He was born 1728 into the Clan MacDonell of Glengarry, the son of John of Crowlin. As a boy, he was sent to the Scots College in Rome. He obtained a commission in one of the Irish regiments in the service of Spain. He saw some action in Italy and was promoted from cadet to lieutenant before volunteering. In 1746, he was part of the invasion force which the French government assembled, the Irish Brigade (French), to assist the Jacobite rebels in Britain. In 1773, he emigrated with others in his clan to Caughnawaga in the Mohawk Valley of the Province of New York at the invitation of Sir William Johnson.

After the war he settled in Upper Canada near St. Andrew's; he died there on April 15, 1810.

His son, Miles Macdonell, was the first governor of what is now Manitoba; another son, John McDonell (Le Prêtre), became a political figure in Upper Canada.
