= David Thorburn (politician) =

Upper Canada politician and justice of the peace

Member of the Legislative Assembly of Upper Canada for Lincoln County, 3rd Riding
- In office 1834–1841
- Preceded by: John Johnston Lefferty
- Succeeded by: Position abolished

Member of the Legislative Assembly of the Province of Canada for Lincoln South
- In office 1841–1844
- Preceded by: New position

Personal details
- Born: 1790 Roxburghshire, Scotland,
- Died: November 1862 (age 72) Queenston, Province of Canada
- Spouse: Isabel Thompson
- Occupation: Merchant

David Thorburn (1790 – November 1862) was a Scottish-born merchant and political figure in Upper Canada. He represented the 3rd riding of Lincoln County in the Legislative Assembly of Upper Canada from 1835 to 1840 as a Reformer, and the riding of Lincoln South in the Legislative Assembly of the Province of Canada from 1841 to 1844.

Thorburn was born in Roxburghshire and came to Upper Canada in 1817. He bought 1,600 acres of land on a Loyalist grant, served in the militia and was a justice of the peace for the Niagara District. In 1823, he married his cousin, Isabel Thompson. They were the parents of Dr James Thorburn.

In 1834, Thorburn stood for election in the 3rd riding of Lincoln County. His opponent, John Johnston Lefferty, was initially declared elected by the returning officer, but Thorburn appealed to the Legislative Assembly. In February 1835, the Assembly accepted Throburn's election petition and declared that he had been elected. He took his seat in the Assembly. He was reelected in 1836, and also served as first warden for the Niagara District.

In 1841, Thorburn was elected to the Legislative Assembly of the Province of Canada, representing the new riding of Lincoln South. A moderate Reformer, he supported the union of the Upper Canada and Lower Canada into the new Province of Canada, and voted consistently for the Reform group led by Robert Baldwin. He declined an invitation by Governor General Sir Charles Bagot to join the provincial Cabinet as Inspector General, in charge of provincial finances.

In 1835, Thorburn was appointed one of the commissioners to oversee the construction of a suspension bridge over the Niagara river, and was also a director of the Suspension Bridge Bank, which failed in 1844. Although his personal conduct was not called into question, he felt it as a blow to his reputation and decided to retire from political life. He was later named local Indian superintendent, working with Six Nations Iroquois. He was also active in other business ventures, as well as being on the Brock Monument Committee.

He died at Queenston, Canada West, in 1862.
