= John Johnston Lefferty =

Upper Canada doctor and politician

John Johnston Lefferty (ca 1777 – October 26, 1842) was a doctor and political figure in Upper Canada.

He was born in New Jersey around 1777 and settled in the Niagara region of Upper Canada in 1797. He served as a surgeon for the militia during the War of 1812; his home was burned by American troops. He opened an apothecary shop in St. Catharines with a partner after the war. In 1825, he was elected to the Legislative Assembly of Upper Canada for the 2nd & 3rd ridings in Lincoln; he was reelected in 3rd Lincoln in 1828. In 1830, he introduced a bill that would allow magistrates to enforce observation of Sunday as a religious day. He criticized the government for its stance on the "alien question" and the Welland Canal. In 1834, he was initially declared reelected in 3rd Lincoln, but was unseated when his opponent, David Thorburn, successfully appealed to the Legislative Assembly.

He died near Niagara Falls in 1842.
