= Colin McNeilledge =

Upper Canada politician

Colin McNeilledge (1798 – October 16, 1839) was a Scottish-born merchant, mill operator and political figure in Upper Canada. He represented Norfolk in the Legislative Assembly of Upper Canada from 1833 to 1834.

He settled in Port Dover. He served in the Lincoln and then Norfolk Militia, reaching the rank of captain. McNeilledge was a justice of the peace for the London District. He was elected to the assembly in an 1833 by-election held following the death of Duncan McCall. McNeilledge died in Port Dover.
