= John Cornwall (Upper Canada politician) =

Upper Canada politician

John Cornwall was a farmer and political figure in Upper Canada. He represented Suffolk and Essex in the Legislative Assembly of Upper Canada from 1797 to 1800.

He was born in Danbury, Connecticut (other sources say that he was a native of Wales and came to the Thirteen Colonies around 1772), the son of John Cornwall. He married Mary Benedict. Cornwall served with Butler's Rangers during the American Revolution. In 1797, he was named a justice of the peace for the Western District. He lived in Colchester Township.

His son Joshua also served in the legislative assembly. His daughter Mary married William McCormick, another member of the legislative assembly.
