= John A. Cameron =

Canadian prospector (1820–1888)

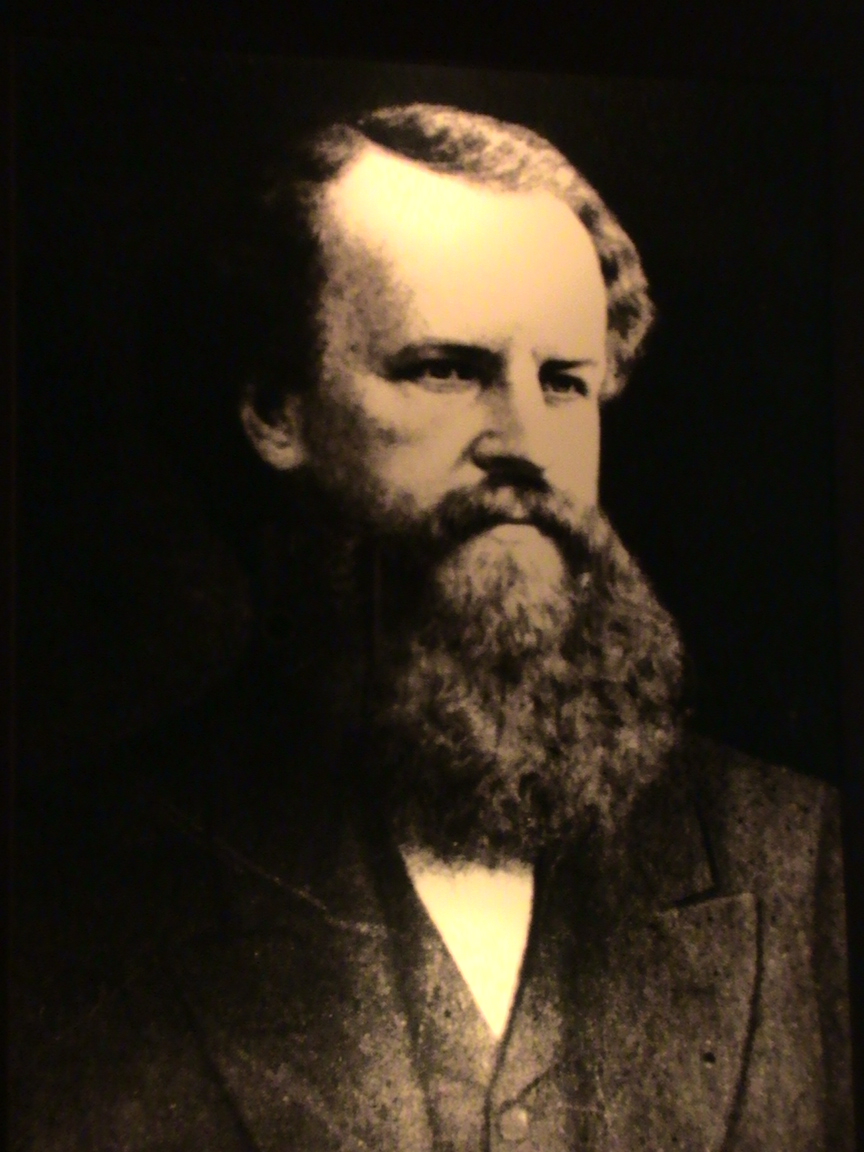
- Born: September 1, 1820; Charlottenburg Township, Upper Canada
- Died: November 7, 1888 (aged 68); Barkerville, British Columbia, Canada
- Occupation: Prospector
- Spouse: Margaret Sophia

John Angus Cameron (September 1, 1820 – November 7, 1888) was a Canadian prospector, also known as "Cariboo Cameron".

== Biography ==
Cameron was born in Charlottenburg Township in Upper Canada in 1820 and grew up in Glengarry County. He went to California with two of his brothers as a prospector in 1850 but had returned by 1860. When gold was discovered in the Cariboo region of British Columbia, he took his family west and arrived in Victoria, British Columbia in 1862. Cameron and his partner Robert Stevenson discovered one of the richest claims in the Cariboo on Williams Creek.

His wife Margaret Sophia had died of typhoid fever just prior to this and Cameron had promised to take her back to Canada West for burial. Cameron and his partner hauled the body 400 miles by toboggan to Victoria, where the body was buried temporarily in a coffin filled with alcohol. The town of Camerontown or Cameronton, long since abandoned, sprung up near Cameron's claim because he wanted to finish mining his claim as quickly as possible and employed 75 men working three shifts. In 1863, he left the Cariboo and transported the coffin back by ship, crossing overland at the Isthmus of Panama, and eventually returned home where he had the coffin reburied.

In 1865, he remarried and built a new residence at Fairfield at Summerstown, on property formerly owned by politician John Cameron, a distant relative. In 1873, he had his first wife's body exhumed to disprove rumours of foul play in her death. Cameron frittered away his fortune and, around 1886, he returned to the scene of his former windfall in British Columbia. He died penniless in Barkerville in 1888.

== See also ==
- Cariboo Gold Rush
