= Zacheus Burnham =

Member of the Legislative Assembly of Upper Canada for Northumberland and Durham
- In office 1816–1820

Member of the Legislative Assembly of Upper Canada for Northumberland
- In office 1825–1828

Member of the Legislative Council of Upper Canada
- In office 1831–1841

Personal details
- Born: February 20, 1777 Dunbarton, New Hampshire
- Died: February 25, 1857 (aged 80) Cobourg, Upper Canada

Zacheus Burnham (February 20, 1777 – February 25, 1857) was a farmer, judge and political figure in Upper Canada.

He was born in 1777 in Dunbarton, New Hampshire. He arrived in Upper Canada in 1797 and settled in Hamilton Township near the current site of Cobourg. He was able to acquire large land holdings, thousands of acres, in the region, some as compensation for survey work. He also helped in the economic development of the Newcastle District, building sawmills and grist mills on his property. He was also involved in the development of transportation links in the region and operated a large and productive farm. He served as a captain in the local militia during the War of 1812 and, in 1813, became a justice of the peace. He was elected to the 7th Parliament of Upper Canada representing Northumberland and Durham. In 1831, he was appointed to the Legislative Council for the province and, in 1839, he was appointed a judge in the Newcastle District court.

He died in Cobourg in 1857.
