= Ralfe Clench =

Canadian politician (1762–1828)

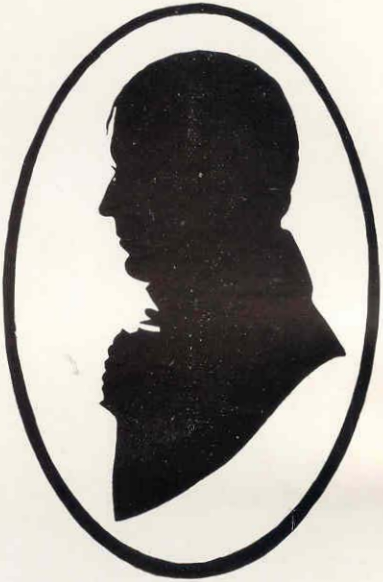
Silhouette portrait, 1827

Ralfe Clench (c. 1762 – January 19, 1828) was a farmer, judge and political figure in Upper Canada. His first name is also sometimes recorded as Ralph or Rudolf; his last name is sometimes recorded as Clinch.

Born in Schenectady, New York around 1762, he joined the British side during the American Revolution and fought with General John Burgoyne in 1777. He later served with Captain Henry Bird and then Butler's Rangers. After the war, he settled at Niagara (Niagara-on-the-Lake) in Upper Canada. He accumulated a number of appointments to government posts in the Niagara District. He served in the local militia, eventually becoming colonel. With Isaac Swayze, he opposed wording in land deeds that they believed compromised people's ability to sell their own land; also with Swayze, he was elected to the 2nd, 3rd and 4th ridings of Lincoln in 1800. They were re-elected in 1804. Clench also represented the 2nd riding of Lincoln from 1812 to 1820. He fought at Queenston Heights during the War of 1812; he was captured by the Americans in 1813 and released at the end of the war. He also served as judge in the district court for the Niagara District.

Clench married Elizabeth Johnson, who was the granddaughter of Sir William Johnson and Molly Brant.

He died at Niagara in 1828.

His son, Joseph Brant Clench, became an official in the Indian Department. His daughter Elizabeth Euretta married Charles Richardson.

The Clench House at 234 Johnson Street in Niagara-on-the-Lake is one of the most significant early 19th century building in the town and was in process of a very substantial and careful renovation and restoration during 2008 and 2009.
