= Tayler (surname) =

Tayler is a surname, and may refer to:

- Alan B. Tayler (1931–1995), British applied mathematician
- Alasdair and Hetty Tayler, duo of British historical writers
- Albert Chevallier Tayler (1862–1925), English artist
- Alec Tayler (1892–1964), Australian rules footballer
- Bert Tayler (1887–1984), English cricketer
- Charles Benjamin Tayler (1797–1875), British Church of England clergyman and author
- Charles Foot Tayler (1794–1853), English portrait miniaturist
- Collette Tayler (1951–2017), Australian academic in early childhood education
- Dick Tayler (born 1948), New Zealand runner
- Edward W. Tayler (1931–2018), American literary scholar.
- Eric Tayler (1921–1997), New Zealand television producer, director and actor
- Frederick Tayler (1889–1954), English cricketer
- Hetty Tayler (1869–1951), British historical writer; sister of Alasdair Tayler
- Howard Tayler (contemporary), American artist and web cartoonist
- Jeffrey Tayler (contemporary), American author and journalist
- John Tayler (1742–1829), American merchant and politician from New York
- John James Tayler (1797–1869), English Unitarian minister
- John Frederick Tayler, (1802–1889), English landscape watercolour painter
- Joseph Needham Tayler (1783–1864), British Royal Navy officer
- J. H. Tayler (1859–1959), American banker and Republican politician
- Josias Tayler (1787–1844), Canadian merchant, judge, and politician
- Kathy Tayler (born 1960), Welsh pentathlete and TV presenter
- Lizz Tayler (born 1990), American pornographic actress
- Lloyd Tayler (1830–1900), architect in Melbourne, Australia
- Matthew Tayler-Smith (born 1987), South African rugby union player
- Michael Tayler (born 1992), Canadian slalom canoeist
- Neale Tayler (1917–1986), Canadian university president
- Richard Symonds-Tayler (1897–1971), British Royal Navy officer
- Robert Tayler (cricketer) (1836–1888), English cricketer
- Robert Walker Tayler Sr. (1812–1878), American politician from Ohio
- Robert Walker Tayler (1852–1910), American politician from Ohio; U.S. Representative 1895–1903
- Roger Tayler (1929–1997), British astronomer
- Saint Cyprian Tayler (1896–1918), English World War I flying ace
- Sally Tayler (born c. 1961), Australian actress
- Sandra Tayler (born 1973), American writer
- William Tayler (1808–1892), civil servant of the East India Company

== See also ==
- Taylor (surname)
