= Welland County =

Historic county in Ontario, Canada

Coordinates: 43°00′N 79°05′W

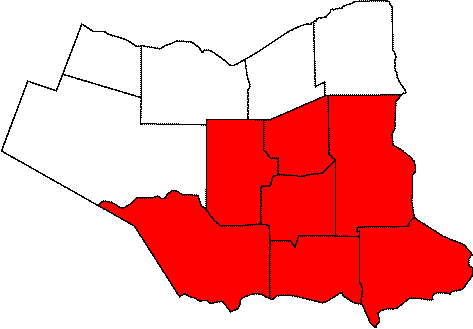
The municipalities which previously formed Welland County are highlighted in red. They are now part of the Regional Municipality of Niagara.

Welland County (area, excluding cities was 226,970 acres) is a historic county in the Canadian province of Ontario.

The county was formed in 1845 from Lincoln County. The county was named from the Welland River. The river got its name from John Graves Simcoe who named it after the River Welland which forms a border of Lincolnshire, England. Niagara Falls, and the Townships in this county were among the earliest settlements in Upper Canada.

In some census and election records from the late 19th century, the townships of Pelham and Wainfleet (which can be seen on the map below) were enumerated as part of Monck County. However, Monck never existed as a county in the political sense, but only as an electoral district.

In 1970, Lincoln and Welland Counties were amalgamated to form the Regional Municipality of Niagara.

== Historic Townships ==
Bertie Township, Area 34,486 acres (139.56 km^{2}). Organized in 1784. Named in honour of Peregrine Bertie, 3rd Duke of Ancaster and Kesteven. Community centres: Fort Erie, Bridgeburg and Ridgeway.

Crowland Township, Area 18,871 acres (76.37 km^{2}). Organized in 1788 and named from an ancient town in Lincolnshire. Veterans of Butler's Rangers were the first settlers. Community centre: Welland.

Humberstone Township, area 29,477 acres (119.29 km^{2}). Opened in 1787 and named from the Lincolnshire town. Community centre of Gravelly Bay was formed in 1832, renamed Port Colborne was incorporated as a village in 1870, became a town in 1918, merged with the neighbouring Village of Humberstone in 1952, and was re-incorporated as a city in 1966. In 1970, Niagara Region municipal restructuring expanded the city by adding Humberstone Township.

Pelham Township. Area 23,394 acres (94.67 km^{2}). Opened in 1790 and named in honor of the Duke of Newcastle; Pelham is one half the family name of Pelham-Clinton. Community centre: Fonthill, North Pelham, Ridgeville, and Fenwick.

Stamford Township, Area 20,876 acres (84.48 km^{2}). Opened in 1784 under the name of Mount Dorchester. John Graves Simcoe changed the name in 1792 honouring an old town in Lincolnshire. Community centres: Niagara Falls (which was first called Clifton), Drummondville and Stamford.

Thorold Township. Area 21,853 acres (88.44 km^{2}). Settled by Butler's Rangers in 1784, but officially set apart in 1788. Named in honour of Sir John Thorold, M.P. for Lincolnshire (1734–1815). Community centres: Thorold, St. John's, Allanburg, Port Robinson.

Wainfleet Township, Area 49,805 acres (201.55 km^{2}). Opened in 1798 and named from a town in the Lincolnshire fens. Community centre: Marshville.

Willoughby Township: Area 18,711 acres (75.72 km^{2}). Opened in 1787 and named from an English Village. Chippawa and others had settled in the region as early as 1784. Navy Island, the scene of William Lyon Mackenzie's exploits in 1837, is within this township.

Source: Province of Ontario -- A History 1615 to 1927 by Jesse Edgar Middleton & Fred Landon, copyright 1927, Dominion Publishing Company, Toronto

== See also ==
- List of townships in Ontario
