= Charles Richardson (Upper Canada politician) =

Upper Canada lawyer and politician

Charles Richardson (March 6, 1805 – March 11, 1848) was a lawyer and political figure in Upper Canada. He represented Niagara (town) in the Legislative Assembly of Upper Canada from 1834 to 1841 as a Conservative.

He was the son of Dr. Robert Richardson and Madeleine Askin. He studied law with John Beverley Robinson. Richardson was married twice: to Elizabeth Euretta Clench, the daughter of Ralfe Clench, and to Jane Clarke. He was a lieutenant in the militia and clerk of the peace for the Niagara District.

In 1832 he had a summer home built in Niagara on the lake. The mansion is still present today, and is currently a 12-room hotel under the name of The Charles Hotel.
