= Russell Mount =

Upper Canada politician

Russell Mount (1797 – January 19, 1834) was a surveyor and political figure in Upper Canada. He represented Middlesex in the Legislative Assembly of Upper Canada from 1830 to 1834 as a Conservative.

He was born in Delaware Township, Upper Canada, the son of Moses Mount and Jane Burtch. Mount learned surveying with Mahlon Burwell. He settled in Delaware Township, having received large land grants in payment for surveying. Mount served in the militia during the War of 1812, later reaching the rank of lieutenant-colonel. He died in office in Toronto.
