= William Wilson (Upper Canada politician) =

Upper Canada militia officer, politician, and justice of the peace (1789–1847)

William Wilson (July 13, 1789 – July 29, 1847) was a miller, distiller and political figure in Upper Canada. He represented Norfolk in the Legislative Assembly of Upper Canada from 1830 to 1834 as a Conservative.

Wilson was born in the old province of Quebec (later Lower Canada), but later moved to Simcoe, Upper Canada. He served in the Norfolk militia during the War of 1812, later reaching the rank of captain. He served as a justice of the peace for the London District and later for the Talbot District. Wilson died in Simcoe.
