= Charles Walters (disambiguation) =

Charles Walters (1911–1982) was an American film director and choreographer.

Charles Walters may also refer to:

- Charles Walters (footballer) (fl. 1899), English footballer
- Charles Walters Jr. (1926–2009), American family farm advocate
- Charles L. Walters (1862–1894), American politician in New Jersey
- Charley Walters (born 1947), Major League Baseball pitcher

== See also ==
- Charlie Walters (1897–1971), English footballer
