= Duncan Cameron (fur trader) =

Canadian politician (1764–1848)

Duncan Cameron (c 1764 – May 15, 1848) was a Canadian fur trader and political figure in Upper Canada.

He was born in Glenmoriston, Scotland around 1764. He came to Tryon County, New York with his parents in 1773. His father served with a loyalist regiment during the American Revolution and the family came to Upper Canada after the war. In 1785, he began work as a clerk for a fur trading company in the Lake Nipigon area. In 1795, he joined the North West Company and became a partner in charge of the Nipigon department. In 1807, he was placed in charge of the Lake Winnipeg department with Alexander MacKay and, in 1811, took charge of the Lac La Pluie department. Throughout this period, he had been in fierce competition with the Hudson's Bay Company.

In 1814, he and Alexander Macdonell of Greenfield were placed in charge of the Red River department. They stirred up resentment among the Métis people and led raids against the Hudson's Bay Red River Colony. He was arrested by Colin Robertson and sent back to England for trial. He was acquitted and compensated for false arrest. In 1820, he returned to Upper Canada and settled in Glengarry County. Cameron represented the county in the 9th Parliament.

He died at Williamstown in 1848.

He had a son named Roderick.
