= James Crooks =

James Crooks (April 15, 1778 – March 2, 1860) was a businessman and political figure in Upper Canada and Canada West.

== Biography ==
He was born in Kilmarnock, Scotland in 1778 and came to Fort Niagara in 1791 where his half-brother, Francis, was operating as a merchant. In 1795, Francis, James and his brother William moved to Newark (Niagara-on-the-Lake). The business expanded into supplying goods to the military, shipping, the production of beer and spirits and potash production. In 1811, they built their own schooner, the Lord Nelson.

He served as a captain in the 1st Lincoln Militia. During the War of 1812, his property was destroyed and the schooner was taken over by the Americans and sank during a storm. He was never fully compensated for these losses. He fought at the Battle of Queenston Heights and later served on the jury at the Bloody Assize of 1814. In 1814, he relocated to West Flamborough Township, which was located further from the border with the United States, and set up a small industrial centre there.

He became a justice of the peace and was elected to the 8th Parliament of Upper Canada representing Halton in 1820. In 1822, he became a director of the Bank of Upper Canada. He was also part of a committee tasked with improving inland navigation. By this time, he was again operating a number of ships transporting goods along the lower Great Lakes. In 1823, with William Morris, he lobbied for the recognition of the Church of Scotland as an official state church of Upper Canada. In 1825, he established the first paper mill in the province and in the next decade built mills on the Trent (at Crooks' Rapids) and Speed Rivers. In 1830, he was re-elected as a representative for Halton and, in 1831, he was appointed to the Legislative Council for the province. As a moderate Tory, he opposed the Family Compact, but also opposed responsible government. He supported union with Lower Canada, although he opposed the use of French in the legislature, and he was re-appointed to the Legislative Council for the united province. In November 1843, he was one of a group of members who walked out of the council to protest the movement of the capital from Kingston to Montreal.

He died on his estate in West Flamborough Township in 1860.

His son, Adam Crooks, went on to serve in the Ontario legislature, becoming attorney general and provincial treasurer.
