= John Chesser (Canadian politician) =

Upper Canada politician

John Chesser was an innkeeper and political figure in Upper Canada. He represented Prescott in the Legislative Assembly of Upper Canada from 1835 to 1836 as a Reformer.

He was born in Lower Canada. His father and paternal grandfather were also named John Chesser. Chesser lived in Caledonia Township and in L'Orignal. He served in the Prescott militia, reaching the rank of captain. In 1824, he was named coroner for the Ottawa District. Chesser was elected to the assembly in an 1835 by-election held after the death of Alexander Macdonell of Greenfield.
