= Alexander Thom (surgeon) =

Canadian politician

- Born: October 26, 1775
- Died: September 26, 1845 (aged 69)
- Known for: Military surgeon, judge and political figure

Alexander Thom (October 26, 1775 – September 26, 1845) was a military surgeon, judge and political figure in Upper Canada.

== Early life and career ==
He was born in Scotland in 1775, the son of a farmer named Alexander Thom, and studied at King's College in Aberdeen.

He joined the British Army and became a surgeon in 1799. He served with the 41st Foot in Lower Canada from 1803 to 1813. Thom was taken prisoner during the War of 1812. He was chosen as the surgeon for the military settlement at Perth in Upper Canada in 1815 and served as the doctor there until 1822. Thom built a sawmill and gristmill on the Tay River at Perth. He was named a justice of the peace and became a judge in the district court in 1835. Thom was elected to the Legislative Assembly of Upper Canada in a February 1836 by-election but defeated in the general election that followed later that year.

== Personal life ==
He married Harriet E. Smythe (Hannah Smith?) at Niagara in 1811. After the death of his first wife, he married Eliza Montague and then Betsy Smythe after Eliza died in 1820. His daughter Harriett, married Perth lawyer James Boulton, the son of judge Henry John Boulton. Another daughter of his, Catherine Rosamund, married Chief Justice John Godfrey Spragge.

== Death ==
He died at Perth in 1845.
