= Jonas Jones =

Canadian politician

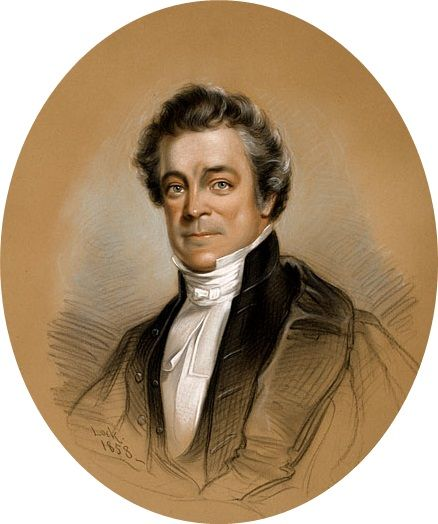

Member of the Legislative Council of Upper Canada

Member of the Legislative Assembly of Upper Canada

Personal details
- Born: May 19, 1791 Augusta Township, Upper Canada
- Died: July 30, 1848 (aged 57) Toronto, Canada West
- Relations: Ephraim Jones, father Charles Jones, brother
- Children: David Ford Jones

Jonas Jones (May 19, 1791 – July 30, 1848) was a lawyer, judge, farmer, livestock breeder, and political figure in Upper Canada.

== Life ==
Jones was born in Augusta Township, Upper Canada in 1791, the third son of Ephraim Jones. His mother's name was Charlotte Coursol. He was educated at John Strachan's school in Cornwall and studied law with Levius Peters Sherwood in Elizabethtown (Brockville) in 1808. Jones's father would die before the outbreak of the War of 1812. During the War of 1812, he enlisted with the Leeds militia, originally as a lieutenant and ultimately became a captain by the conclusion of hostilities. He was called to the bar in 1815 and set up a practice in Brockville. In 1816, he was elected to the 7th Parliament of Upper Canada, representing Grenville and held that seat until 1828.

In 1817, Jones married Mary Elizabeth Ford. They had 14 children together: 11 sons (3 dying in infancy) and 3 daughters. His oldest son David Ford later became a member of the Canadian House of Commons. His son Chilion was a business partner with architect Thomas Fuller in the reconstruction of the Canadian Parliament buildings.

In 1820, Jones became a bencher of the Law Society of Upper Canada, and was recognized as a leading member of the bar.

In 1830, Jones purchased some pure-bred animals from Commodore Robert Barrie of the Kingston dockyard, by 1835 Jones's sheep were noted as winning prizes in competitions at local fairs, and by 1837 Jones was offering the sales of "brood-mares, colts, draught-horses, oxen, and sheep".

Although conservative, he had his own views on the protection of individual rights and the independence of the elected assembly. However, he helped unseat Barnabas Bidwell in 1821. In 1822, he opposed the union of Upper and Lower Canada. He supported bills which helped fund the development of the Welland Canal, and he was a member of a committee which recommended further improvements of transportation along the Saint Lawrence River. He was appointed judge in the Bathurst and Johnstown District courts.

With his brother Charles Jones, who represented Leeds in the Legislative Assembly, he operated mills at Furnace Falls (Lyndhurst). He was a director of the Bank of Upper Canada branch at Brockville and, in 1834, became the president of the Saint Lawrence Inland Marine Assurance Company.

In 1833, he was appointed president of a commission to help improve navigation along the Saint Lawrence which met with American engineers and, in 1834, work began on a canal at Cornwall and other projects were planned. In 1836, he was elected to the 13th Parliament of Upper Canada representing Leeds. He was appointed to the Legislative Council in 1839, serving as speaker while John Beverley Robinson was on leave. He was appointed to the Court of the King's Bench in 1837.

In October 1839, Jones took "no notice of petitions from the chiefs of the Six Nations" which attacked the credibility and character of young woman who had been raped by a Mohawk man named Noah Powlis.

Between November 1839 and July 1840, Jones "used every judicial means possible to obtain a free pardon for Grace Smith", Grace being a young black girl who was convicted of arson". When Jones's recommendation failed to convince the Executive Council (who were anxious to make an example), Jones consulted the other judges and delivered the opinion that "the Judgment of death...in this case is erronious (erroneous)", and the council concurred.

In 1842, his daughter, Mary Elizabeth, married Lieutenant-General Charles Younghusband CB FRS, a British Army officer and meteorologist.

He died in Toronto on July 30, 1848, apparently of some form of seizure or stroke. Jones apparently left his room feeling "drowsy" and decided to take a walk before dinner at the suggestion of a colleague, and was found hours later collapsed in a building that he owned after a child had reported "judge Jones lying drunk". Jones was found completely paralyzed on his right side and unable to talk. Jones died soon later and was buried before many of his family had arrived. Jones left everything in his will to his wife.
