= John Cameron (Upper Canada politician) =

Upper Canada politician

John Cameron (1778 – August 7, 1829) was a farmer and political figure in Upper Canada.

He was born in the Mohawk Valley in New York state, the son of a United Empire Loyalist. He lived on a property he named Fairfield in Charlottenburgh Township, located near the current location of Summerstown, Ontario. He served as a lieutenant in the local militia during the War of 1812. In 1814, he was named justice of the peace in the Eastern District. He represented Glengarry in the 7th Parliament of Upper Canada. He died at Fairfield in 1829.

The property at Fairfield was later owned by prospector John A. Cameron, known as "Cariboo Cameron".
