= John McDonell (Le Prêtre) =

Canadian judge (1768–1850)

Member of the Legislative Assembly of Upper Canada for Prescott
- In office 1816–1820

Personal details
- Born: November 30, 1768 Scotland
- Died: April 17, 1850 Pointe-Fortune, Canada East
- Spouse: Magdeleine Poitras
- Occupation: Soldier; judge; politician; fur trader

John McDonell (also spelled Macdonell; November 30, 1768 – April 17, 1850) was a soldier, judge, and political figure in Upper Canada.

He was born in Scotland in 1768, the son of John MacDonell of Scothouse, and came to the Mohawk Valley of the Province of New York in 1773 with his family and other members of the MacDonell clan. By 1778, the family had settled north of the Saint Lawrence River near the current location of Cornwall, Ontario.

He joined the North West Company and travelled west to the Qu'Appelle River valley. He became head of the Upper Red River department and, then, the Athabasca department. Because of his piety, he was given the nickname Le Prêtre by his men.

In 1812, while returning to Montreal, he heard that war had broken out with the United States and joined a group of fur traders planning to join an attack on the garrison on Mackinac Island. He became a captain in the Corps of Canadian Voyageurs but was taken prisoner at Saint-Régis.

In 1813, he settled in Hawkesbury Township in Upper Canada near Pointe-Fortune, where he began farming. Contrary to the usual practice of the time, he had brought his Métis wife, Magdeleine Poitras, back with him from the west. He opened a general store and also operated a forwarding business for moving goods along the Ottawa River. In 1816, he became a judge of the Ottawa District court and was elected to the 7th Parliament of Upper Canada representing Prescott. He was also a colonel in the local militia.

He died at Pointe-Fortune in 1850 and was buried at St. Andrews East, Quebec, on the other side of the Ottawa River.
