= William Bruce (Canadian politician) =

Upper Canada politician

William Bruce (died September 20, 1838) was a medical doctor and political figure in Upper Canada. He represented Stormont in the Legislative Assembly of Upper Canada from 1834 to 1836.

He was born in Upper Canada, the son of William Bruce and Mary Alguire. Bruce was educated by John Strachan in Cornwall and went on to study medicine. He lived in Cornwall. Bruce served in the Stormont militia during the War of 1812, later reaching the rank of lieutenant. He was named a justice of the peace for the Eastern District in 1833 and was appointed coroner in 1835. He died in Cornwall.
