= Charles Jones (Upper Canada politician) =

Upper Canada politician

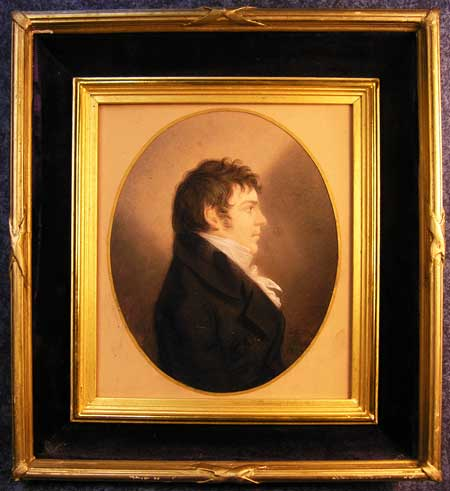
Portrait of Charles Jones by F.W. Lock, 1857

Charles Jones (February 28, 1781 – August 21, 1840) was a businessman and political figure in Upper Canada.

He was born in Montreal in 1781, the son of Ephraim Jones, and came to Augusta Township, then known as Township No. 7, in Upper Canada with his family in 1784. He was educated in the United States and became a clerk in the Johnstown District court in 1800 and district treasurer in 1803.

Jones settled near Elizabethtown (Brockville) in 1802 and opened a general store. In 1808, Jones built a new district court-house and jail in the town, allowing it to replace Johnstown as the district town. He built saw mills and flour mills west of Brockville and was involved in a number of industries in the area, including mines and ships. He was a member of the Leeds militia and represented Leeds in the 8th and 9th Parliaments in the province. His brother, Jonas, was also a member of the Legislative Assembly. He was appointed to the Legislative Council of Upper Canada in 1828.

Jones died in Brockville in 1840.
