= William Benjamin Wells =

Canadian politician

William Benjamin Wells (October 3, 1809 – April 8, 1881) was a lawyer, judge, journalist and political figure in Upper Canada.

He was born in Augusta Township in Upper Canada in 1809. He studied law with Marshall Spring Bidwell in Kingston and was called to the bar in 1833. In 1834, he was elected to the Legislative Assembly of Upper Canada representing Grenville as a Reformer. Although he was reelected in 1836, he travelled to England to protest the interference by Sir Francis Bond Head in the election. He wrote Canadiana: containing sketches of Upper Canada, and the crisis in its political affairs, which described radical Reform policies of the time. He did not involve himself in the Upper Canada Rebellion; however, allegations of his involvement with William Lyon Mackenzie's Patriots led to his expulsion from the assembly.

In 1851, he was appointed district court judge in Kent County. He retired from the bench in 1878. He contributed articles on law and sport to various periodicals in Canada and the United States. He died at Toronto in 1881.
