= Asa Werden =

Upper Canada politician

Asa Werden (1779–1866) was a farmer, businessman and political figure in Upper Canada. He represented Prince Edward in the Legislative Assembly of Upper Canada from 1830 to 1834 as a Conservative.

He was born in Stonington, Connecticut, the son of Dr. Isaac Werden. He married Elizabeth Ellsworth. Werden was involved in the manufacture of leather and the timber trade; he also speculated in land. He served in the militia during the War of 1812. In 1821, he was named a justice of the peace for the Midland District. His election in 1830 was declared invalid but he was reelected in a by-election held the following year. He was an unsuccessful candidate in 1835, losing to Charles Bochus. Werden died in Athol Township, Canada West.
