= Joshua Cornwall =

Upper Canada politician

Joshua Cornwall (died March 16, 1826) was a farmer, miller and political figure in Lower Canada. He represented Kent in the Legislative Assembly of Upper Canada from 1816 to 1820.

He was the son of John Cornwall and Mary Benedict. Cornwall lived in Detroit and then Camden Township.

His son Nathan also served in the legislative assembly.
