= Charles Watters =

Charles Watters may refer to:

- Charles J. Watters (1927–1967), American chaplain awarded the Medal of Honor posthumously
- Charles Watters (politician) (1818–1881), politician and judge in New Brunswick, Canada
