= Henry Yager =

Canadian politician

Henry Wandal Yager (bef May 12, 1802 – January 9, 1860) was a farmer, businessman and political figure in Upper Canada.

== Early life ==
He was born in Claverack, Columbia County, New York, in 1802, the son of Wandal Yager and Eva Dings. The family moved to Upper Canada and settled in Thurlow Township, Hastings County, Ontario about 1800. He was not a United Empire Loyalist. He married Elizabeth White, daughter of Reuben White who was also elected to the Legislative Assembly of Upper Canada.

== Career ==
From the land records, it appears that he was an active speculator frequently buying and selling land in the area and is often referred to as a merchant in the deeds though no record of his business has been found. In 1834, Yager was elected to the 12th Legislative Assembly of Upper Canada session for Hastings. He was a reformer. Thirteen letters were saved by the family from his political years and are now held by the Archives of Canada and called the Henry W Yager Fonds.

== Later life and death ==
In 1847, he left Canada and took his family to Wisconsin, where he bought a farm in Dane County, Wisconsin about 4 miles from Madison, near the home of his daughter Lorinda. He died in Dane County in 1860.
