= Charles Walker Robinson =

Canadian-born British Army officer and writer

Major-General Sir Charles Walker Robinson, KCB (3 April 1836 – 20 May 1924) was a British North American-born British Army officer and writer on military subjects.

Born in Toronto, Upper Canada, the son of John Beverley Robinson, he attended Trinity College, before joining the British Army as a second lieutenant in the Prince Consort's Own (Rifle Brigade). He fought in the Indian Rebellion of 1857, then the Third Anglo-Ashanti War, then the Anglo-Zulu War. He became a Major-General in 1892. He was promoted to Knight Commander of the Order of the Bath (KCB) in the 1923 Birthday Honours, and appointed Lieutenant-Governor of Royal Hospital Chelsea. He died in London, England.

Robinson was designated a Person of National Historic Significance in 1938 by the Canadian government.

== Works ==
- Life of Sir John Beverley Robinson (1904)
- Canada and Canadian defence: the defensive policy of the Dominion in relation to the character of her frontier, the events of the War of 1812–14, and her position to-day (1910)
- Wellington's campaigns, Peninsula—Waterloo, 1808-15; also Moore's campaign of Corunna (1914)
