= John Campbell (Upper Canada politician) =

Upper Canada farmer and political figure

John Campbell (1789 – August 9, 1834) was a Scottish-born farmer and political figure in Upper Canada. He represented Frontenac in the Legislative Assembly of Upper Canada from 1830 to 1834 as a Reformer.

He received a land grant in Upper Canada and lived in Kingston. Campbell served in the Royal Navy on Lake Erie during the War of 1812. He was commander of HMS Chippawa, was wounded and taken prisoner. Campbell served as justice of the peace for the Midland District. He died in Kingston.
