= Gilbert McMicking (Canadian politician) =

Canadian politician

Gilbert McMicking (born December 10,1788 - November 17, 1847) was a businessman and political figure in Upper Canada. He was the son of Agness Roberson (1745–1827) and Peter McMicking (1731–1823), a United Empire Loyalist who immigrated to Upper Canada during the American Revolutionary War and settled in Stamford in 1780.

Gilbert served as quartermaster for the local militia during the War of 1812. He was appointed coroner for the Niagara District in 1811. In 1838, he became customs collector at [Queenston, Ontario]. He represented the 4th riding of Lincoln in the Legislative Assembly of Upper Canada from 1834 to 1841 as a Reformer. He also served as reeve of Stamford Township, Welland Co.

He married Catherine Swayze (1793–1877) on April 16, 1811, and had two daughters, Sarah Catherine (1814–1882, m. John Keefer) and Mary Ann (1818–1892, m. James Fergus McGlashan).

Gilbert McMicking died November 17, 1847, at Willoughby Twp, Welland Co., Canada West. He is buried at the Stamford Presbyterian Church Cemetery in Niagara Falls, Ontario, Canada.

Land deeds

On 24 April 1835 the executive council ordered to Gilbert McMicking a licence of occupation for Lots 7, 8, 9, 10 and 11 Concession 4 Willoughby Twp. containing five hundred acres, reserved as a Glebe. (Willoughby Township Papers 267)

Extract from a report of a committee of the executive council dated 22 Nov 1842: Peter Sayler and others inhabitants of the Township of Willoughby informing the Government that Gilbert McMicking who obtained a licence of occupation of certain Glebe Lots 7, 8, 9, 10 and 11 in the 4th Concession of the said township has been cutting the best timber and otherwise injuring the said lots. The lots for which licence of occupation was given to Mr. McMicking are Glebe Lots or Clergy Reserves and as such should not be used for any purpose foreign to the trust upon which they are placed at the disposal of the Provincial Government. The committee therefore recommend that Mr. McMicking be informed that the licence of occupation is revoked and that the lands be treated in future as ordinary Clergy Reserves. (Willoughby Township Papers 0269)

On 23 December 1842 David Thorburn wrote to the Commissioner of Crown Lands saying his friend Mr. McMicking of Chippawa has shown Thorburn a letter from the Commissioner informing that the licence of occupation which he held under date of 24 Apr 1835 for Lots No. 7, 8, 9, 10 and 11 in the Township of Willoughby had been cancelled. If the Executive Council could reconsider their decision, Thorburn felt confident that Mr. McMicking has strong claims upon the Government relative to his being allowed to use those lands for a longer period. First the ground on which he obtained them were to procure fuel to a steam flouring mill, no water mill being in that part of the country for a great distance to enable the inhabitants of the five townships composing the fourth riding of Lincoln to gey funding with the exception of two which were far from the steam mill and they only by the spring and fall freshet did grinding for a few weeks in the year. The steam mill was erected at great expense and without the advantage of the wood from those uncultivated lands in its vicinity the erection would not have answered the purpose. But unfortunately the mill has been totally consumed during our recent trouble by two incendianis (sic incendiaries) who came from the American side expressly to destroy them. One of the incendianis was afterwards apprehended and remained in our gaol for over one year and was discharged on his giving information relative to the plot. The loss to Mr. McMicking was three thousand five hundred pounds which has nearly ruined him. Another reason is that roads in that township are of the very worst kind. Indeed, there is scarcely a road in it and on that account he has done much and still is opening new roads much to the advantage of the interior settler. He has leased the Block out to a few poor Germans in fifty-acre parcels for a few years. (Willoughby Township Papers 0273)

On 3 May 1822 Gilbert McMicking as agent for his father Peter McMicking paid to the Receiver General’s Office the surveying fees for the west half of Lot 44 in the Township of Stamford containing 50 acres. £1.0.0 fees of survey. (Stamford Township Papers 0240)

== Sources ==
- Becoming Prominent: Leadership in Upper Canada, 1791-1841, J.K. Johnson (1989)
- Genealogy of McMicking of Clan Miadhachain, R G McMicking (2010)
- Bibliography: Journal of the House of Assembly of Upper Canada ..., Volume 1, by Ontario. Parliament. House of Assembly - 18th Parliament, 4th Session, 1889
