= Nathan Cornwall =

Upper Canada politician

Nathan Cornwall (died January 21, 1849) was a miller and political figure in Upper Canada. He represented Kent in the Legislative Assembly of Upper Canada from 1834 to 1841 as a Conservative.

He was born in Upper Canada, the son of Joshua Cornwall, and lived in Camden Township. Cornwall commanded a militia company in 1838. He served as justice of the peace for the Western District. Cornwall died in Chatham, Canada West.
