= Dennis Woolverton =

Upper Canada politician

Dennis Woolverton (January 1, 1790 – May 23, 1875) was a farmer and political figure in Upper Canada. He represented the 1st riding of Lincoln in the Legislative Assembly of Upper Canada from 1834 to 1836 as a Reformer.

He was born in New Jersey, the son of Jonathan Woolverton and Mary Barcroft, and came to Upper Canada with his family in 1798. Woolverton was married twice: to Catherine Nixon and then to Mary Ann Nelles, the daughter of Robert Nelles. He served as a sergeant in the militia during the War of 1812. Woolverton lived in Grimsby Township.

His grandson Linus Woolverton became a noted Ontario fruit grower.
