= Sir John Robinson, 1st Baronet, of Toronto =

Judge and political figure in Upper Canada (1791-1863)

The Honourable Sir John Robinson Bt CB
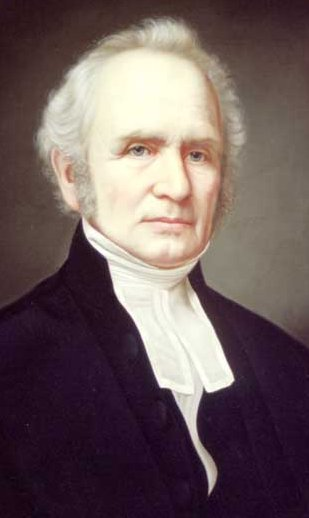

Chief Justice of Upper Canada
- In office July 1829 – 10 February 1841
- Monarch: King George IV
- Preceded by: Sir William Campbell
- Succeeded by: (none: Province of Canada created by Act of Union 1840)

1st Chief Justice of Canada West
- In office 10 February 1841 – 15 March 1862
- Monarch: Queen Victoria
- Preceded by: (new office)
- Succeeded by: William Henry Draper
- Constituency: York (town)

Member of the Legislative Assembly of Upper Canada
- In office 31 January 1821 – July 1829
- Monarch: King George IV
- Governor: Peregrine Maitland
- Preceded by: new riding
- Succeeded by: Robert Baldwin
- Constituency: York, Upper Canada

Chancellor of the University of Trinity College
- In office 1852 – 31 January 1863
- Preceded by: (new title college founded 1852)
- Succeeded by: John Hillyard Cameron

Solicitor General for Upper Canada
- In office 13 February 1815 – 1818
- Preceded by: G. D'Arcy Boulton
- Succeeded by: Christopher Alexander Hagerman

Attorney General for Upper Canada
- In office 11 February 1818 – 1829
- Preceded by: G. D'Arcy Boulton
- Succeeded by: Henry John Boulton

Personal details
- Born: 26 July 1791 Berthier, Lower Canada
- Died: 31 January 1863 (aged 71) Toronto, Ontario
- Spouse: Emma Walker (m. 1817)
- Children: 2, including Charles
- Relatives: Christopher Robinson (father); Peter Robinson (brother); William Benjamin Robinson (brother); Frederick Philipse Robinson (1st cousin); Sir William H. Robinson (1766–1836, Commissary-General of Nova Scotia)

Military service
- Battles/wars: Battle of Queenston Heights

Sir John Beverley Robinson, 1st Baronet, CB (26 July 1791 – 31 January 1863) was a lawyer, judge and political figure in Upper Canada. He was considered the leader of the Family Compact, a group of families which effectively controlled the early government of Upper Canada.

== Life and career ==
Robinson was born in 1791 at Berthier, Lower Canada, he was the son of Christopher Robinson, a United Empire Loyalist of one of the First Families of Virginia, whose ancestor, also named Christopher Robinson, came there about 1666 as secretary to Sir William Berkeley, Governor of Virginia. In 1792, the family moved to Kingston in Upper Canada and then York (later renamed Toronto). After his father's death in 1798, he was sent to live and study in Kingston. In 1803, he moved to Cornwall, where he lived and was educated at the school of the Reverend John Strachan. Afterwards he articled in law with D'Arcy Boulton and later John Macdonell.

During the War of 1812, he served with Isaac Brock and fought at the Battle of Queenston Heights. On the death of John Macdonell, he became acting attorney general for the province at the age of 21. He prosecuted the case of 18 settlers from Norfolk County who had committed treason by taking up arms against their neighbours on behalf of the Americans in a series of trials later referred to as the "Bloody Assize". When D'Arcy Boulton returned to Canada in 1814, Robinson was given the post of attorney general.

Robinson acquired property on the north-east corner of John and Richmond streets in Toronto and built the prominent Beverley House. Originally built as a small cottage around the time of the War of 1812, he added numerous wings to the property until the alterations filled the square. Robinson lived in Beverley House until his death.

In 1817, Robinson was retained by the North West Company in their civil case against Lord Selkirk. When the company decided to press for criminal charges of theft and assault against Selkirk, Robinson prosecuted the case. Although he returned the company's retainer, there were allegations of conflict of interest. Robinson also represented the Crown in the case against Robert Fleming Gourlay, a reformer critical of government policies. Gourlay was eventually banished from the province.

Although the abolition of slavery did not legally come into effect in the British colonies—including Upper and Lower Canada, until 1833—in 1819, then Attorney General, John Beverley Robinson, declared that in Upper Canada all black residents were protected by British law and were free.

In 1820, Robinson was elected to the 8th Parliament of Upper Canada representing the town of York. Robinson played an important role in the expulsion of Barnabas Bidwell, a former member of the United States Congress who was elected in a by-election in Lennox & Addington, from the Legislative Assembly. Robinson sailed to England in 1822, seeking to resolve problems with funding in the province. This culminated in the Canada Trade Act of August 1822 which established import duties on goods transported between the United States and Upper Canada, and Upper Canada's share of duties collected. During his time in England, he was also called to the bar after completing studies at Lincoln's Inn.

Robinson was the most important member of the Family Compact, an unofficial clique of Upper Canada's elite, who held the true power in the province. One of the more contentious issues dealt with in the 9th Parliament was the naturalization process for persons who had remained in the United States after 1783 and later came to Canada. Robinson supported a policy dictated by the British Colonial Office which required these people to renounce their American citizenship. He was embarrassed when a new colonial secretary reversed this decision under pressure from those who held opposing views. In 1827 Robinson had a disagreement with John Walpole Willis, a puisne judge. Willis took an unusual course of stating in court that Robinson had neglected his duty and that he would feel it necessary "to make a representation on the subject to his majesty's government". Willis also took a strong stand on the question of the legality of the court as then constituted, and this led in June 1828 to Willis being removed from his position by the lieutenant-governor, Sir Peregrine Maitland.

In 1829, Robinson became chief justice of the Court of King's Bench and held this post for 34 years. In 1830, he was appointed to the Legislative Council for the province. In the aftermath of Upper Canada Rebellion, he pressed for executions of the rebel leaders, including Peter Matthews and Samuel Lount (to quote: "in his Opinion it was necessary for the ends of Justice, and due to the Loyal Inhabitants of the Province, that some examples should be made in the way of Capital punishments"). Although he opposed the uniting of Upper and Lower Canada, several of his recommendations found their way into the Union Act of 1840. In 1850, he was appointed a Companion of the Order of the Bath (CB) and created a baronet in 1854.

Robinson married Emma Walker on 5 June 1817 while in England. They had four sons and three daughters. Three sons became lawyers. His youngest son attained the rank of major-general in the British Army. His second son, John Beverley Robinson, entered politics, serving as Mayor of Toronto, as a member of cabinet in the federal government and was appointed lieutenant governor of Ontario in the 1880s.

He was a first cousin of Sir Frederick Philipse Robinson. His brother William Benjamin Robinson married Elizabeth Ann, daughter of William Jarvis, and his elder sister Mary married Major Stephen Heward, formerly of the Grenadier Guards and later Auditor-General of Upper Canada. His younger sister Esther married D'Arcy Boulton (1785–1846), the son of G. D'Arcy Boulton, who built The Grange and also served as Auditor-General of Upper Canada. He was the stepson of Elisha Beman, one of the important founders of Newmarket, Ontario.

In the spring of 1861, Robinson suffered a severe attack of gout and curtailed his work on the bench. He resigned from the Queen's Bench on 15 March 1862, and was appointed presiding judge of the Court of Error and Appeal. Later in 1862, he had another attack of gout and finally retired in January 1863. On 28 January, Bishop Strachan gave him communion, and he died three days later.

== Tributes and legacy ==
Robinson Street in Simcoe, Ontario is named is his honour.

An oil painting of Sir John Beverley Robinson by George Théodore Berthon is part of the Early Canadian Art permanent collection of the National Gallery of Canada. It was painted in c. 1846 and purchased by the Gallery in 1963.

Legal offices
Preceded by Sir William Campbell (judge); 1825–1829	Chief Justice of Upper Canada (1829–1841) and Canada West (1841–1862); 1829–1862	Succeeded by William Henry Draper; 1862–1867
Academic offices
New title college founded	Chancellor of the University of Trinity College; 1852–1863	Succeeded by John Hillyard Cameron
Baronetage of the United Kingdom
New creation	Baronet (of Toronto); 1854–1863	Succeeded by James Lukin Robinson
