= Reuben White =

Canadian politician

Reuben White (c. 1779 – January 6, 1858) was a farmer, businessman and political figure in Upper Canada.

He was likely born in Schoharie County, New York, in 1779, the son of William White and Hannah Tompkins. The family moved to Upper Canada and settled in Sidney Township, Hastings County, Ontario about 1800. His father and some siblings became Quakers in Upper Canada but it is clear that Reuben did not. He was not a United Empire Loyalist though he married Esther Marsh who was a daughter of Loyalist, Matthias Marsh.

Early on he was a farmer along the shore of the Bay of Quinte. In 1820, White was elected to the 8th Legislative Assembly of Upper Canada session for Hastings. He was re-elected in the 9th and 11th Legislative Assemblies.

In 1833, he was one of the Commissioners who received tenders for the construction of a 750-foot (230 m) long covered bridge spanning the mouth of the Trent River at Trenton, Ontario, called Port Trent at the time. He was a tavern owner as evidenced by the fact that he paid a tavern licence fee in 1837. In 1841, he sold 1-acre (4,000 m^{2}) of land from his farm for the construction of a large frame Methodist church known as “White’s Church” and capable of holding 500 people. An 1855 copy of a map indicates a saw mill on his land.

His son-in-law, Henry W Yager followed him by being elected to the 12th Legislative Assembly of Upper Canada.

Following the 1837 Rebellion, he was arrested in December of that year on a charge of insurrection or treason but released in early January and the trial never occurred.

He is buried in White’s Cemetery, near his farm, and has a tall column headstone demonstrating his prominence in the community.
