= Charles Waters (Canadian politician) =

Canadian politician

Charles Water
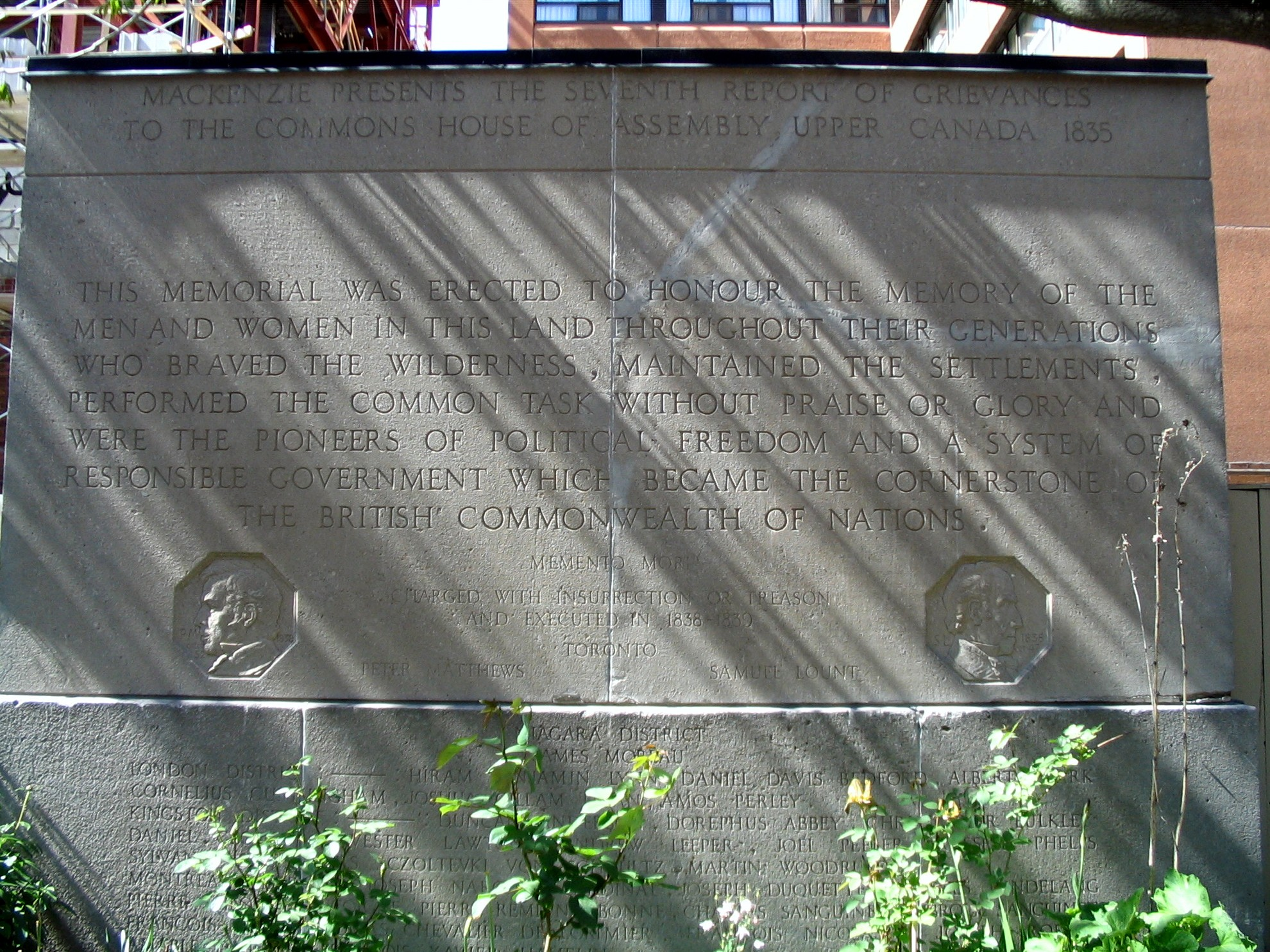
- Emanuel Hahn's "Mackenzie Panels" (1938) in the garden of Mackenzie House, Toronto, Ontario Canada. The panel shows William Lyon Mackenzie presenting his historic Seventh Report of Grievances to the House of Assembly of Upper Canada.
- Born: May 29, 1787; Vermont
- Died: September 9, 1869 (aged 82)
- Occupations: Farmer, Merchant, and Political Figure in Upper Canada
- Political party: Reformer
- Spouse: Maria Frost
- Parent: Abel Waters

Charles Waters (b. May 29, 1787 Vermont; d. September 9, 1869) was a farmer, merchant and political figure in Upper Canada. He represented Prescott in the Legislative Assembly of Upper Canada from 1835 to 1836 as a Reformer.

Waters was the son of Abel Waters, who served in the King's American Dragoons. He married Maria Frost. Waters served in the county militia, was a justice of the peace and coroner for the Ottawa District. He helped write the Seventh Report for the Grievances Committee. On Jan. 23, 1835, Wm. Lyon MacKenzie was given the appointment to move forward with the Grievances Report. Waters thought of MacKenzie as one of his most trusted friends. He died in L'Orignal, Canada West.
