= Josias Tayler =

British soldier, Upper Canada politician and judge

Josias William Tayler (Taylor)
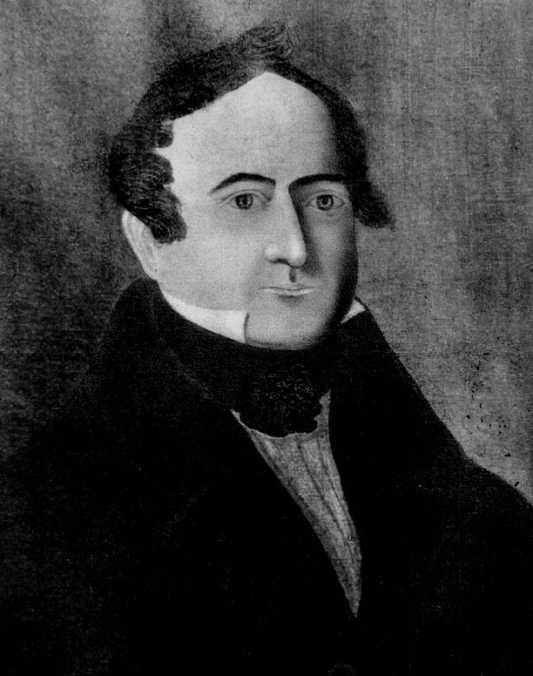
- Born: 20 July 1782; Bailiwick of Jersey
- Died: 12 January 1845; Canada
- Burial place: 1817 Beckwith Ontario Concession 1, Lot 7 NE
- Occupation: Canadian-british soldier in canada 1811
- Office: Judge of Perth, Ontario, from 1819 to 1837

Josias Tayler (20 July 1787 – 12 January 1844) was a merchant, Justice Of Peace, Trustee of the District School, and Perth, Ontario 1st postmaster, judge and political figure in Upper Canada.

He was born in England in 1787. He served in the British Army in 1811, then came to Upper Canada during the War of 1812 and later settled in Beckwith in 1817. He was named justice of the peace in the Johnstown District in 1821 and in the Bathurst District in 1833. He represented Lanark in the Legislative Assembly of Upper Canada from 1834 to 1836. In 1835, he was named judge in the court for the Bathurst District. Tayler later died in Perth in 1844 at the age of 56.

Tayler was a part of the Canadian Fencibles 1812–1815.
