= William McCormick (Upper Canada politician) =

Canadian politician

William McCormick (May 30, 1784 – February 18, 1840) was a businessman, author and political figure in Upper Canada. He represented Essex in the Legislative Assembly of Upper Canada from 1812 to 1824.

He was the son of Alexander McCormick, a fur trader in the Ohio country, and Elizabeth Turner. He moved to Malden Township and then in Colchester Township with his family. In 1809, McCormick married Mary Cornwall, the daughter of John Cornwall. He served in the militia during the War of 1812, first as lieutenant and then as captain. He was taken prisoner near the end of 1813 and later released. After the war, he was awarded a contract to supply pork to Fort Malden; McCormick raised his pigs on Pelee Island. He also owned a general store in Colchester. McCormick also served as deputy collector of customs, a magistrate and deputy postmaster. He lobbied for the construction of a lighthouse on Pelee Island and later served as lighthouse keeper. He died on Pelee Island at the age of 55.
