= John Brown (Upper Canada politician) =

Upper Canada politician

John Brown (c. 1791 – January 28, 1842) was an Irish-born merchant and political figure in Upper Canada. He represented Durham in the Legislative Assembly of Upper Canada from 1830 to 1836 as a Conservative.

A native of County Cavan in Ireland, Brown came to Port Hope from New York in 1818 to make a new home for his family in Upper Canada. By 1823, he was so well-established that he had built the first brick building in the village as a home for his family, at the foot of Walton Street. As a businessman involved in many fields, he owned a cut nail factory, a distillery, a general store, and, one mile north, a complex he called 'Brown Stone Mills', comprising flouring mills, a saw mill, a blacksmith shop, a cooper shop, store houses, and a granary. In 1829, he was elected president of the Harbour Company of Port Hope, of which he was the principal owner.

As a supporter of the Tory Party, he was elected to the Upper Canada Legislature in 1830 and 1835 as a Member of Parliament for Durham County. On 7 April 1834, Brown became the first elected Head of the Board of Police for Port Hope, of which Marcus Whitehead was chosen president. He was also a justice of the peace for the Newcastle District. It was said, "With his feuds and shenanigans, he (John Brown) made Port Hope an interesting place in which to live (and) with his enterprise he did much to lift the village from its primitive state".

Brown and his wife were the parents of four daughters: Ann, married to Francis H. Burton.; Eliza, married to William Wallis; Rosanne, married to James Madison Andrews; Margaret, married to Henry Howard Meredith.
