= Duncan McCall =

Canadian politician (1769–1832)

Duncan McCall (November 18, 1769 – November 25, 1832) was a businessman and political figure in Upper Canada.

He was born in Basking Ridge, New Jersey in 1769, the son of a private in the British Army, and came to New Brunswick with his family after the American Revolution. In 1796, his family settled in Charlotteville Township in Upper Canada and Duncan followed in 1797. He operated a store there and also farmed. In 1824, he was elected to the Legislative Assembly of Upper Canada for Norfolk; he was reelected in 1828 and 1830. In the assembly, he lobbied for the replacement of the jail and courthouse at Vittoria after a fire and the construction of a lighthouse at Long Point. He served as a justice of the peace and was also a member of the local militia. He died in York in 1832 after suffering a fever for several days.
