= Philip VanKoughnet =

Canadian politician (1790–1873)

The Honourable Colonel Philip VanKoughnet
- Born: 11 April 1790; New Johnstown, Upper Canada
- Died: 7 May 1873 (aged 83); Cornwall, Ontario

Colonel The Hon. Philip VanKoughnet (April 2, 1790 – May 7, 1873) M.P., was a landowner, businessman and political figure in Upper Canada.

== Career ==
Born in New Johnstown (Cornwall), 2 April 1790, he was the son of Michael VanKoughnet (1751–1832), a landowner and United Empire Loyalist. He was educated at the elitist school run by John Strachan which automatically placed him among the Family Compact. He fought at the Battle of Crysler's Farm during the War of 1812. In 1816, he was elected to the 7th Parliament of Upper Canada representing Stormont & Russell. In 1833, he was part of a commission to establish a canal at Cornwall to improve transportation along the Saint Lawrence River, that brought him a personal profit of £10,000. VanKoughnet Island, off the canal, was named for him.

In 1832, Philip VanKoughnet inherited his father's extensive lands in Upper Canada (which he bought in 1783 after the Americans had put a price on his head for his loyalty to the Crown) adding to them over time until at his death he owned the entirety of the district. His father had named the original settlement 'New Johnstown', after Johnstown (New York) where the Colonel's grandfather, John, or Johann Eberhardt von Gochnat (1712–1770), had lived on arriving from Alsace in 1751.

In 1836, VanKoughnet was appointed to the Legislative Council of Upper Canada by Lieutenant Governor Sir Francis Bond Head. The Globe newspaper nicknamed him "Van Weevil" who was taken into the Cabinet in 1857 and given charge of agriculture. He had announced a campaign for the destruction of weevils.

In 1838, he commanded a battalion of militia (2nd Stormont Regiment) at the Battle of the Windmill. In 1870, he was appointed chairman of the Canadian Board of Government Arbitrators. It was said of the Colonel that he had, ‘all the stubbornness of a German, with the patriotism of a Briton’. He had ‘earned the respect of his contemporaries for his sterling qualities and honest patriotism’, holding little regard for the American revolutionaries.

== Family ==
On 1 April 1819, he married Harriet Sophia Scott (1795–1854), daughter of Mathew Scott (1775–1812), of the Scotts of Scottsborough, County Tipperary; a nephew of the notorious John Scott, 1st Earl of Clonmell and descended on two sides from Nicholas Purcell, 13th Baron of Loughmoe. VanKoughnet's father-in-law had been 'a very eminent, affluent and respectable merchant' of Carrick-on-Suir, but following the Irish Rebellion of 1798, he was publicly flogged and then wrongly imprisoned for giving grain to the starving Catholic population in his home town. Scott declared himself bankrupt after a lengthy Lawsuit against the man who flogged him, during which time the price of grain fell. He briefly took his family to America to regenerate his business, but this failed and back in Ireland he took his life in 1812 . Mrs VanKoughnet's sister, Catherine (Scott) Pack (1785–1863), was the great grandmother of the author Sir Arthur Conan Doyle, creator of Sherlock Holmes.

Philip and Harriet left thirteen children, who after his death on 7 May 1873, divided Cornwall, Ontario (which New Johnstown is now known as) between themselves. Their eldest son, The Hon. Philip Michael Matthew Scott VanKoughnet, became the Chancellor of Upper Canada (Ontario), and among others they were the grandparents of Lady MacDonald, Lady Van Straubenzee and Mrs F.E. Meredith.

== History of family ==
The VanKoughnets originated during the Middle Ages in Switzerland, when their name was spelt Von Gochnat, meaning "of Gochnang," after they had acquired the lands of Gachnang and Schellenberg in 1336. They remained loyal to the princes of Austria and were guests of the Holy Roman Emperor at Zurich in 1443. They later entrusted their considerable landholdings to Sigismund, Archduke of Austria, but he and the succeeding Holy Roman Emperors used the money raised to fight a series of unsuccessful wars, which led to the loss of their land by 1556.

They maintained their noble name but were forced to move to Zurich and its surrounding villages. They remained prominent citizens there and as the Germans came to dominate the area, they began to spell their name Von Gochnat. During the Thirty Years' War, an ancestor fled to Turckheim and then Colmar, in Alsace, where the next three generations of his family were all members of the grand jury.

When the French regained possession of Alsace, Philip's pro-German grandfather was stripped of his status and in 1751 emigrated to North America. There, the Dutch settlers, who did not understand the German prefix von and so corrupted the name to VanKoughnet, which it has remained.
