= Miles Macdonell =

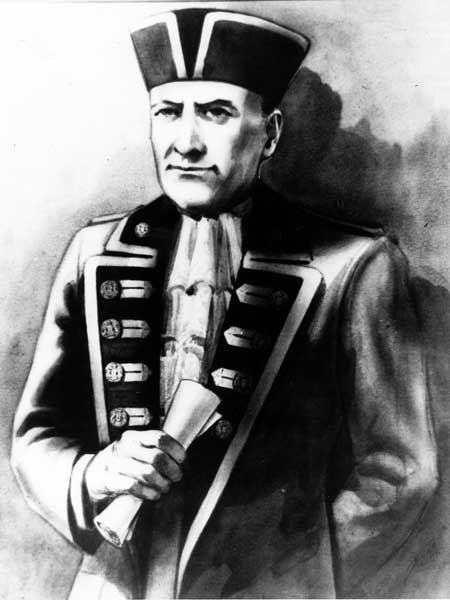
- Miles Macdonell

1st Governor of the Red River Colony
- In office August 1812 – June 1815
- Succeeded by: Robert Semple

Personal details
- Born: c. 1767 Inverness, Scotland
- Died: 28 June 1828 (aged 60–61) Pointe-Fortune, Upper Canada
- Parent: John MacDonell of Scothouse
- Occupation: Fur Trader, Governor of the Red River Colony

Miles MacDonell (c. 1767 – 28 June 1828) was the first governor of the Red River Colony (or, Assiniboia), a 19th-century Scottish settlement located in present-day Manitoba and North Dakota.

Miles Macdonell Collegiate, opened in 1952, in Winnipeg, Manitoba, was named in his honour.

== Biography ==
He was born in Inverness, Scotland, around 1767. In 1773, his father, Colonel John MacDonell of Scothouse (Spanish John), Inverness-shire, and three of his cousins chartered the Pearl and brought over five hundred of their families and friends, at the invitation of Sir William Johnson, and settled at Caughnawaga, on the Mohawk River, in the Province of New York.

Miles, who showed military tendencies at an early age, was appointed ensign in the King's Royal Regiment of New York in 1792, lieutenant in the Royal Canadian volunteers in 1794, and captain in the same corps in 1796. At the request of Lord Selkirk, he came to London in 1803, and was induced by that nobleman to assume the post of governor of Selkirk's planned colony on the Red River in the Northwest territory. Selkirk, a shareholder in the Hudson's Bay Company, had bought 300,000 km² (116,000 mi²) of land in the Red River Valley from the company in order to provide a home in the New World for destitute Scots and to deny the land to Hudson's Bay's commercial rival, the North West Company.

Macdonell collected the first body of colonists, composed principally of evicted Scottish Highlanders from the Sutherland estates, in 1812. He sailed from Stornoway for the colony in 1811. The group wintered at York Factory, and reached the Red River the following August. On his arrival, he was at once met with opposition from the agents of the North West Company, whose headquarters were at Montreal. On 11 June 1815, representatives of the North West Company attacked and fired upon the colonists, and demanded the surrender of Governor Macdonell, who, to avoid the loss of blood, gave himself up voluntarily. He was taken to Montreal as a prisoner, and charges were laid against him by his enemies, but his case was not tried. During his ten or twelve years' connection with the Red River Colony, he was its leading spirit and took an active and decided part in the feuds of the Hudson's Bay Company and North West trading companies, after which he returned to his farm at Osnabruck, Upper Canada.

Historians have generally agreed that, despite the inherent difficulties of establishing a colony at the Red River amid the fierce competition between the fur-trading companies, Macdonell must bear some of the responsibility for the colony’s initial failure. They have focused upon his character faults, his inability to inspire trust and loyalty among his people, his obstinacy, his arrogance, his unaccommodating temper, and his lack of staying power. It was these flaws, as well as his lack of shrewdness and diplomatic skill, that led to his failures. Either he never understood his situation, or worse, refused to come to grips with it. Nowhere is this better shown than in the decision to issue the Pemmican Proclamation. It was promulgated at a time when the colony was too weak to defend itself and it offered the NWC excellent propaganda against both the HBC and Lord Selkirk. His behaviour during those years suggests that he saw the colony as entirely separate from the fur trade but his point of view does not excuse an insensitivity that blinded him to the provocative nature of his actions. Through a similar blindness he alienated his own people, seeking out the company of "gentlemen" in preference to theirs.

In later years, he lived at the residence of his brother John at Pointe-Fortune on the Ottawa River where he died in 1828.
