= Donald Æneas MacDonell =

Upper Canada politician

Donald Aeneas MacDonell (July 31, 1794 – March 11, 1879) was a soldier and political figure in Upper Canada.

He was born in Charlottenburgh Township in Upper Canada in 1794, the son of Miles Macdonell, and studied with John Strachan in Cornwall. He served in the British Army during the War of 1812, reaching the rank of lieutenant. In 1834, he was appointed justice of the peace for the Eastern District and was elected to the Legislative Assembly of Upper Canada; he was reelected in 1836 but ran unsuccessfully for a seat in the Legislative Assembly of the Province of Canada in 1841.

He was elected to the assembly in 1844 and then defeated again in 1848. He also served in the local militia, serving as commanding officer of the 1st Battalion of Stormont from 1846 to 1850. He also led an expedition to Beauharnois during the Lower Canada Rebellion.

In 1848, he became warden for the Kingston Penitentiary and he served until 1869.

He retired in Brockville, where he died in 1879.
