= John Clarke (Upper Canada) =

Merchant, farmer and political figure in Upper Canada

John Clarke (1780s – July 12, 1862) was a merchant, farmer and political figure in Upper Canada. He represented 1st Lincoln in the Legislative Assembly of Upper Canada from 1820 to 1828 and from 1830 to 1834 as a Conservative. His name also appears as John Clark.

He was born in Kingston in 1783 or 1786, the son of James Clarke, sheriff for the Niagara District, and Jemima Mason. Clarke was educated by the Reverend John Strachan and at the garrison school and Richard Cockerell's school in Niagara. He married Sarah Adams. Clarke lived in Louth Township. He served in the county militia, reaching the rank of lieutenant-colonel. From 1835 to 1852, Clarke was customs collector at Port Dalhousie.
