= Caughnawaga, New York =

Former town in New York, U.S.

Coordinates: 42.9499°N 74.3929°W

Caughnawaga is a former town in then Tryon County, later Montgomery County, New York, United States. It lies near Fultonville, New York, ten miles west of Amsterdam in the Mohawk Valley west of Albany.

Caughnawaga (Mohawk: Kahnawà꞉ke) is a Mohawk word meaning "at the rapids", referring to sites along the Mohawk River. It was also the name of a Mohawk village nearby that was occupied from 1666 to 1693, when it was destroyed by French colonists. Today the Caughnawaga Indian Village Site is a state-recognized archaeological site.

French Jesuits established a mission there, which operated for about 10 years ranging from 1668 to 1679; they taught some of the Mohawk and their captives to read and write in French, as well as teaching them about Christianity (Roman Catholicism). Scholars believe that a village known as "Caughnawaga" was first located upstream until 1679 at what is now known as the "Fox Farm site". The French attacked the site in retaliation for other killings, and the Mohawk moved it to this location. Archaeologist Dean Snow gives a population estimate of around 300 people, fewer than had lived at the Fox Farm site due to the departure of converted Catholic Mohawk to Canada by 1679.

The French and other European settlers began to apply the term Caughnawaga to the peoples who had taken refuge in the Seigneury Sault du St-Louis land granted by the Jesuits on the Lachine Rapids on the St. Lawrence River who had, by converting to Roman Catholicism, They were also called the "Praying Indians", as they were natives who had converted to Roman Catholicism, under the influence of Jesuit French missionaries, and had acquired the rights of naturalized Frenchmen. This was to delineate them from natives in places like the Mohawk village Kahnawake in what is now New York State with which the French were often at war.

Mohawk were still living in this area at the time when the Dutch colonists formed an early settlement in what is now the eastern part of the village of Fonda, New York and called it Caughnawaga.

In 1772, this area became part of the Mohawk District of Tryon County. In 1780, the district was partitioned. The Mohawk District remained south of the River, and the new district to the north became the Caughnawaga District. In 1788, the state made all districts defunct and the territory was reorganized as the Town of Caughnawaga, named after the Dutch settlement.

After the Town of Caughnawaga was divided in 1793, it no longer existed in name. The town of Amsterdam, along with the Fulton County towns of Broadalbin, Johnstown, and Mayfield were created from the former territory of Caughnawaga.
