= Donald Macdonell (Upper Canada politician) =

Canadian politician

Donald Macdonell of Greenfield (January 17, 1778 – June 13, 1861) was a political figure in Upper Canada.

He was born in Greenfield, near Aberchalder, in Inverness-shire, Scotland in 1778, the son of Alexander Macdonell of Greenfield, and came to Charlottenburgh Township in Upper Canada in 1792 as part of a group of Scottish settlers led by his father. He studied with John Strachan in Cornwall. He served with the local militia during the War of 1812, reaching the rank of lieutenant-colonel. During the war, his brother John Macdonell of Greenfield was killed at the Battle of Queenston Heights. After the war, he was appointed registrar for Glengarry County. In 1819, he became sheriff for the Eastern District. Like another brother Alexander Macdonell of Greenfield he served in government and in 1834, he was elected to represent Glengarry in the Legislative Assembly of Upper Canada and he served until 1841. He served in the militia during the Lower Canada Rebellion. In 1846, he was appointed assistant adjutant-general of militia for Canada West, serving until his death in Quebec City in 1861.

In 1853, Macdonell laid the cornerstone for the Brock Memorial at Queenston Heights, where Brock and his brother had died.

His grandson Donald Greenfield MacDonell served as a member of the Canadian House of Commons.
