= Lincoln County, Ontario =

County in Ontario, Canada

Coordinates: 43°10′N 79°20′W

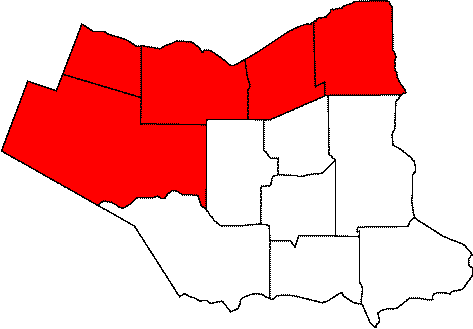
The municipalities which previously formed Lincoln County are highlighted in red. They are now part of the Regional Municipality of Niagara.

Lincoln County is a historic county in the Canadian province of Ontario.

The county was formed in 1792. In 1845, the southern portion of Lincoln County was separated to form Welland County.

In some census and election records from the late 19th century, the townships of Caistor and Gainsborough (which can be seen on the map below) were enumerated as part of Monck County, while Grantham and Niagara Townships were enumerated as part of Niagara County. However, neither Monck nor Niagara ever existed as incorporated municipal counties, but rather as electoral districts.

In 1970, Lincoln and Welland Counties were amalgamated to form the Regional Municipality of Niagara.

== See also ==
- List of townships in Ontario
