= Frank W. Stahnisch =

German-Canadian historian

Frank W. Stahnisch is a historian of medicine and neuroscience at the University of Calgary in Canada, where he holds the endowed Alberta Medical Foundation/Hannah Professorship in the History of Medicine and Health Care. He is jointly appointed in the Department of History, Faculty of Arts, and the Department of Community Health Sciences, Cumming School of Medicine, and is a member of the Calgary Hotchkiss Brain Institute, and the O'Brien Institute for Public Health. He has also received an adjunct professorship in the Department of Classics and Religion of the Faculty of Arts. His research interests in the history and philosophy of the biomedical sciences cover: the development of modern physiology and experimental medicine, the history of neuroscience and the history of psychiatry, as well as the development of modern medical visualization practices. Since 2015, he has succeeded Professor Malcolm Macmillan (University of Melbourne, Australia) as an editor-in-chief of the international "Journal of the History of the Neurosciences" (with Taylor & Francis - Routledge Group), and since 2021 he is also an associate editor for the history and philosophy of the behavioural neurosciences with "Frontiers in Psychology".

== Education and training ==
Born in Frankfurt am Main, Germany, Stahnisch graduated from Elisabethenschule high school and entered the Johann Wolfgang Goethe University of Frankfurt in 1990, where he commenced his undergraduate studies in medicine, philosophy, psychology and sociology. Continuing his studies at the Humboldt University of Berlin, the University of Edinburgh in Scotland and the Université de Rennes I in France, he received his Master of Science degree in Philosophy of Science from the University of Edinburgh and his Doctorate degree in History of Medicine from the Free University of Berlin. Following to teaching positions held at the Humboldt University of Berlin, the Friedrich-Alexander University of Erlangen-Nuernberg and the Johannes Gutenberg University of Mainz, he became a two-year Visiting Assistant Professor in the Department of Social Studies of Medicine at McGill University in Montreal. Further Visiting Professorships included the Max Planck Institute for the History of Science in Berlin, the Institute for the History and Ethics of Medicine at the Ruprecht Karls University in Heidelberg, Germany, the Office for History of Science and Technology at the University of California at Berkeley, USA, the Institute for Advanced Studies at Goethe University in Frankfurt, Germany, the Institute for Advanced Studies in the Humanities at the University of Edinburgh, Scotland, and the Department of History at Dartmouth College in Hanover, NH, USA. In 2008, Stahnisch was appointed to the faculty of the University of Calgary in the rank of an associate professor, where he has chaired the inter-faculty and inter-departmental History of Medicine and Health Care Program and acts as co-coordinator (history) of the Calgary History and Philosophy of Science Program. He has continued in these roles as a full professor since 2016. In 2015, he also became a research fellow of the Calgary Centre for Military, Security and Strategic Studies (CMSS), and in 2018 of the Mathison Centre for Mental Health Research and Education.

== Work in the history of medicine and neuroscience ==
His doctoral dissertation, which was supervised by Volker Hess at the Institute for the History of Medicine at the Free University of Berlin, was a history of laboratory practices in early 19th-century French experimental physiology, an analysis of "Ideas in action: The notion of function and its methodological role in the research program of the experimental physiologist François Magendie (1783-1855)". The manuscript became short-listed for the Young Scholars' Prize of the German Society for the History of Medicine, Science and Technology (DGGMNT), Wittenberg (Germany) in 2002. It was subsequently published with LIT Press in Muenster, Hamburg, London (2003), being one of the first specialized works in German language on experimental practices in modern medical research laboratories.

Stahnisch's recent book, entitled "Great Minds in Despair - The Forced Migration of German-Speaking Neuroscientists to North America, 1933 to 1989" and published with McGill-Queens University Press in Montreal, PQ and Kingston, ON, received the 2026 Outstanding (Non-Biography) Book Award in the History of the Neurosciences through the International Society for the History of the Neurosciences. His monograph, entitled "A New Field in Mind: A History of Interdisciplinarity in the Early Brain Sciences" and published with McGill-Queens University Press in Montreal, PQ and Kingston, ON, was given the Jason A. Hannah Medal in the History of Medicine of the Royal Society of Canada in 2021. The medal recognizes Canadian research in the history of medicine and honours an important publication. As an in-depth and innovative study, the book tracks the emergence and evolution of neuroscientific research from the late nineteenth century to the early postwar period, while including a comparative international and cultural historical perspective on the brain sciences. In 2022, the book was also selected as Runner Up for the Outstanding Book Award in the History of the Neurosciences through the International Society for the History of the Neurosciences.

His historiographical work has won further awards and prizes, including a Feodor Lynen Fellowship of the Alexander von Humboldt Foundation (Germany), the John J. Pisano Award of the National Institutes of Health (NIH) in the United States, the H. Richard Tyler Award of the American Academy of Neurology (USA), the Dimitrije Pivnicki Award in Neuro- and Psychiatric History of McGill University (Canada), a University of Calgary Faculty of Arts' Research Award for Established Scholars, the Sandra L. Panther Fellowship in the History of Family Medicine at the Center for the History of Family Medicine, and an Annual Fellowship of the Calgary Institute for the Humanities (Canada). In 2009, he received the inaugural Klaus Reichert Prize for Medical Philosophy through the Aspects of Medical Philosophy Series and the Literary Society of Karlsruhe (Germany). From 2010 to 2011, he was President of the International Society for the History of the Neurosciences (ISHN) and co-organized the first joint meeting of ISHN and Cheiron (The International Society for the History of Behavioral and Social Sciences) at the University of Calgary and the Banff Centre for the Arts (June, 2011) in Alberta (Canada). In 2012, Stahnisch was awarded the inaugural Mary Louise Nickerson Fellowship in Neuro-History by the Osler Library of the History of Medicine at McGill University (Canada); and in acknowledgement of his outstanding performance in a specific area of professional activity (Medical Education) directly or indirectly related to the field of medicine (History of Medicine), incl. the organization of the nationwide annual History of Medicine Days conferences at the University of Calgary, he received an Honorary Fellowship through the Royal College of Physicians and Surgeons of Canada (2024). In recognition of his groundbreaking scholarship in the history of medicine and the history and philosophy of neuroscience, he was inducted as a Fellow of the Royal Society of Canada (Academy of Arts and Humanities) in 2025. The Canadian Academy of Health Sciences also recognized his work on the development of scientific ideas and medical practices in health care across disciplines, cultures, and national boundaries, which has advanced modern understandings of global medical history, through the bestowment of a fellowship.

Stahnisch's research has been funded, among other inter/national agencies, by the Alexander von Humboldt Foundation (AvH), the German Research Foundation (DFG), the German Academic Exchange Service (DAAD), The Gerda Henkel Foundation, Associated Medical Services (AMS), Alberta Medical Foundation (AMF), the Alberta Historical Resources Foundation (AHRF), the Calgary Institute for the Humanities (CIH), the Max Planck Society (MPG), Nova Scotia Health Research Foundation (NSHRF), the Federation for the Humanities and Social Sciences, the Social Sciences and Humanities Research Council of Canada (SSHRC), and the Canadian Institutes of Health Research (CIHR).

== Books (selection) ==
- Great Minds in Despair - The Forced Migration of German-Speaking Neuroscientists to North America, 1933 to 1989 (Series: McGill-Queen's/Associated Medical Services Studies in the History of Medicine, Health, and Society, Vol. 66, ed. by J.T.H. Connor, Erika Dyck). Montreal, PQ, Kingston, ON, London, UK, Chicago, IL: McGill-Queens University Press 2025
- A New Field in Mind - A History of Interdisciplinarity in the Early Brain Sciences (Series: McGill-Queen's/Associated Medical Services Studies in the History of Medicine, Health, and Society, Vol. 52, ed. by J.T.H. Connor, Erika Dyck). Montreal, PQ, Kingston, ON, London, UK, Chicago, IL: McGill-Queens University Press 2020 (the book was awarded the 2021 Jason A. Hannah Medal in the History of Medicine of the Royal Society of Canada; in 2022 it was selected as Runner Up for the Outstanding Book Award in the History of the Neurosciences through the International Society for the History of the Neurosciences)
- Medicine, Life and Function - Experimental Strategies and Medical Modernity at the Intersection of Pathology and Physiology (Series: Aspects of Medical Philosophy, Vol. 11., ed. by C. Hoffstadt et al.). Bochum, Freiburg, Germany: Projektverlag 2012 (manuscript received the inaugural 2009 Klaus Reichert Prize for Medical Philosophy through the Literary Society Karlsruhe)
- Ideas in Action: Der Funktionsbegriff und seine methodologische Rolle im Forschungsprogramm des Experimentalphysiologen François Magendie (1783-1855) (Series: Naturwissenschaft – Philosophie – Geschichte, Vol. 18., ed. by P. Hucklenbroich). Muenster, Hamburg, Germany, London, UK: LIT-Press 2003 (manuscript shortlisted for the 2002 Foerderpreis der Deutschen Gesellschaft fuer Geschichte der Medizin, Naturwissenschaft und Technik e.V.)
- (with Robert Lampard, David B. Hogan, and James R. Wright, Jr.): Creating the Future of Health - The History of the Cumming School of Medicine at the University of Calgary, 1967-2012. Calgary, AB: University of Calgary Press 2021
- (with Erna Kurbegović, eds.): Psychiatry and the Legacies of Eugenics - Historical Studies of Alberta and Beyond. Edmonton, AB: Athabasca University Press 2020
- (with Diana J. Mansell, Paula Larsson, eds.): Bedside and Community - 50 Years of Contributions to the Health of Albertans from the University of Calgary. Calgary, AB: University of Calgary Press 2020
- (ed.) Émigré Psychiatrists, Psychologists, and Cognitive Scientists in North America since the Second World War. Berlin, Germany: Max Planck Institute for the History of Science 2018
- (with Guel A. Russell, eds.): Forced Migration in the History of 20th Century Neuroscience and Psychiatry - New Perspectives. London, UK: Routledge 2017
- (ed.) Probing the Limits of Method in the Neurosciences. Toronto, ON: University of Toronto Press 2016
- (with Dorothy Porter, eds.): Boundary Work and Trading Zones in the History of Medicine and Medical Humanities. Salt Lake City, UT: University of Utah Press 2015
- (with Thomas Hoffmann, eds.): Kurt Goldstein - Der Aufbau des Organismus. Einfuehrung in die Biologie unter besonderer Beruecksichtigung der Erfahrungen am kranken Menschen (Series: Uebergaenge, Vol. 62., ed. by W. Essbach and B. Waldenfels). Munich, Paderborn, Germany: Fink Verlag 2014
- (with Sylwia Werner, Claus Zittel, eds.): Ludwik Fleck - Denkstile und Tatsachen: Gesammelte Schriften und Zeugnisse. Berlin, Germany: Suhrkamp 2011
- (with Heijko Bauer, eds.): Bild und Gestalt: Wie formen Medienpraktiken das Wissen in Medizin und Humanwissenschaften? (Series: Medizin und Gesellschaft, Vol. 13., ed. by U. Weisser). Muenster, Hamburg, Germany, London, UK: LIT-Press 2007
- (with Ulrich Schoenherr, Antonio Bergua, eds.): Albert Neissers (1855-1916), Stereoscopischer Medicinischer Atlas' – Eine aussergewoehnliche fotografische Sammlung aus dem Gebiet der Augenheilkunde. Wuerzburg, Germany: Koenigshausen & Neumann 2006
- (with Florian Steger, eds.): Medizin, Geschichte und Geschlecht. Koerperhistorische Rekonstruktionen von Identitaeten und Differenzen (Series: History and Philosophy of Medicine, Vol. 1., ed. by A. Frewer). Stuttgart, Germany: Franz Steiner 2005

== Peer-reviewed articles (selection) ==
- Émigré Neurophysiologists' Situated Knowledge Economies and their Roles in the Forming International Cultures of Scientific Excellence. In: Notes and Records – The Royal Society Journal of the History of Science 78 (2024), pp. 299–322
- Making Medical History Relevant to Medical Students: The First 50 Years of the Calgary History of Medicine Program and History of Medicine Days Conferences. In: Journal of the History of Medicine and Allied Sciences 78 (2023), pp. 83–100
- Personal Writing as a Resilience Process for Refugee Physicians – The Case of Émigré Neuroanatomist Hartwig Kuhlenbeck (1897-1984). In: Studies in the Literary Imagination 52 (2022), pp. 19–37
- A Century of Brain Regeneration Phenomena and Neuromorphological Research Advances, 1890s-1990s – Examining the Practical Implications of Theory Dynamics in Modern Biomedicine. In: Frontiers in Cell and Developmental Biology 9 (2022), pp. 1–16
- (with Claude Debru and Mireille Delbraccio:) ‹‹Des gens comme moi étaient désignés comme des 'psychiatres vétérinaires'›› – Les relations germano-américaines en recherche biomédicale dans la période de l'immédiat après-guerre, 1948-1973. In: Neuroscience et Psychiatrie – Progrès scientifiques et réflexions philosophiques. Eds. Claude Debru and Mireille Delbraccio, Éditions Hermann: Paris, France 2019, pp. 81–117
- (with Christopher G. Kemp:) 'Inter-national' Suffering and Local Medical Counselling: Dr. William G. Niederland (1904-1993) and the Psychiatric Contours of Empathy. In: History of Intellectual Culture 12 (2019), pp. 1–20
- (with Aravind Ganesh:) 'The Gray Degeneration of the Brain and Spinal Cord' - A Story of the Once Favored Diagnosis With Subsequent Vessel-Based Etiopathological Studies in Multiple Sclerosis. In: Journal of Nervous and Mental Disease 207 (2019), pp. 505–514
- The 'Brain Gain Thesis' Revisited: German-Speaking Émigré Neuroscientists and Psychiatrists in North America. In: Global Transformations in the Life Sciences, 1945-1980. Eds. Patrick Manning and Mat Savelli, University of Pittsburgh Press: Pittsburgh, PA 2018, pp. 128–145
- (with Robert Nitsch:) Neuronal Mechanisms Recording the Stream of Consciousness – A Reappraisal of Wilder Penfield's (1891-1976) Concept of Experiential Phenomena Elicited by Electrical Stimulation of the Human Cortex. In: Cerebral Cortex 28 (2018), pp. 3347–3355
- False Reflexes in the History of Physiology. In: Isis – A Journal of the History of Science Society 108 (2017), pp. 664–671
- How the Nerves Reached the Muscle: Bernard Katz, Stephen W. Kuffler and John C. Eccles – Certain Implications of Exile for the Development of 20th-Century Physiology. In: Journal of the History of the Neurosciences 26 (2017), pp. 351–384
- 'What was in their Luggage?' – German Refugee Neuroscientists, Migrating Technologies, and the Emergence of Interdisciplinary Research Networks in North America, 1933-1963. In: The History of the Brain and Mind Sciences: Technique, Technology, Therapy. Eds. Delia Gavrus and Steven Casper (Rochester Studies in Medical History Series, Vol. 40), University of Rochester Press: Rochester, NY 2017, pp. 164–182
- Learning Soft Skills the Hard Way: Historiographical Considerations on the Cultural Adjustment Process of German-Speaking Émigré Neuroscientists in Canada, 1933 to 1963. In: Journal of the History of the Neurosciences 25 (2016), pp. 299–319
- The Process of Forced-Migration as 'PR Process'? – German-American Psychiatrist Lothar B. Kalinowsky (1899-1992) and the Trans-Atlantic Transfer of the Electroconvulsive Therapy Approach. In: Canadian Bulletin of Medical History 33 (2016), pp. 385–417
- The Early Eugenics Movement and Emerging Professional Psychiatry: Conceptual Transfers and Personal Relationships between Germany and North America. In: Canadian Bulletin of Medical History 30 (2014), pp. 17–40
- The Emergence of 'Nervennahrung': Nerves, Mind and Metabolism in the Long Eighteenth Century. In: Studies in History and Philosophy of Biological and Biomedical Sciences 43 (2012), pp. 405–417
- (with Peter J. Koehler): Three 20th Century Multi-Authored Handbooks Serving as Vital Catalyzers of an Emerging Specialization – A Case Study from the History of Neurology and Psychiatry. In: The Journal of Nervous and Mental Disease 200 (2012), pp. 1067–1075
- The Tertium Comparationis of the Elementa Physiologiae – Johann Gottfried von Herder's Conception of 'Tears' as Mediators between the Sublime and the Actual Bodily Physiology. In: Blood, Sweat and Tears – The Changing Concepts of Physiology from Antiquity into Early Modern Europe. Eds. Manfred Horstmanshoff, Helen King, and Claus Zittel (Intersections – Interdisciplinary Studies in Early Modern Culture, Vol. 25), Brill: Leiden, Boston, MA 2012, pp. 595–626
- German-Speaking Emigre Neuroscientists in North America after 1933: Critical Reflections on Emigration-Induced Scientific Change. In: Österreichische Zeitschrift für Geschichtswissenschaften 21 (2010), pp. 36–68
- The Human Nervous System – A Clavichord? On the Use of Musical Metaphors in Modern Neurology. In: Neurology of Music. Ed. Frank Clifford Rose, Imperial College Press: London, UK 2010, pp. 73–102
- The Use of Animal Experimentation in the History of Neurology. In: History of Neurology. Eds., Stanley Finger, François Boller, and Kenneth L. Tyler (Handbook of Clinical Neurology, Vol. 95, 3rd Series), Elsevier B.V.: Edinburgh, Amsterdam 2009, pp. 129–148
- Transforming the Lab: Technological and Societal Concerns in the Pursuit of De- and Regeneration in the German Morphological Neurosciences, 1910-1930. In: Medicine Studies. An International Journal for History, Philosophy, and Ethics of Medicine & Allied Sciences 1 (2009), pp. 41–54
- Ludwig Edinger (1855-1918) – Pioneer in Neurology. In: Journal of Neurology 255 (2008), pp. 147–148
- Instrument Transfer as Knowledge Transfer in Neurophysiology: François Magendie's (1783-1855) Early Attempts to Measure Cerebrospinal Fluid Pressure. In: Journal of the History of the Neurosciences 17 (2008), pp. 72–99
- Gehirn, Genom und Geschichte - Wissenschaftshistorische und medizinethische Aspekte der Flexibilisierung des Personkonzepts in den Neurowissenschaften des 20. Jahrhunderts. In: Dimensionen der Person: Genom und Gehirn. Ed., Dietmar Huebner, Mentis: Paderborn 2006, pp. 151–178
- Historical and Philosophical Perspectives on Experimental Practice in Medicine and the Life Sciences. In: Theoretical Medicine and Bioethics 26 (2005), pp. 397–425
- "Die Photographie als Huelfsmittel mikroskopischer Forschung?" Joseph von Gerlach (1820-1896) und die fruehen anatomischen Mikrophotographen. In: Berichte zur Wissenschaftsgeschichte 28 (2005), pp. 135–150
- Den Hunger standardisieren: François Magendies Fuetterungsversuche zur Gelatinekost 1831-1841. In: Medizinhistorisches Journal. Medicine and the Life Sciences in History 39 (2004), pp. 103–134
- Making the Brain Plastic: Early Neuroanatomical Staining Techniques and the Pursuit of Structural Plasticity, 1910-1970. In: Journal of the History of the Neurosciences 12 (2003), pp. 413–435
- (with Robert Nitsch): Santiago Ramón y Cajal's Concept of Neuronal Plasticity: The Ambiguity Lives On. In: Trends in Neurosciences 25 (2002), pp. 589–591
