= John Rolph =

Canadian politician (1793–1870)

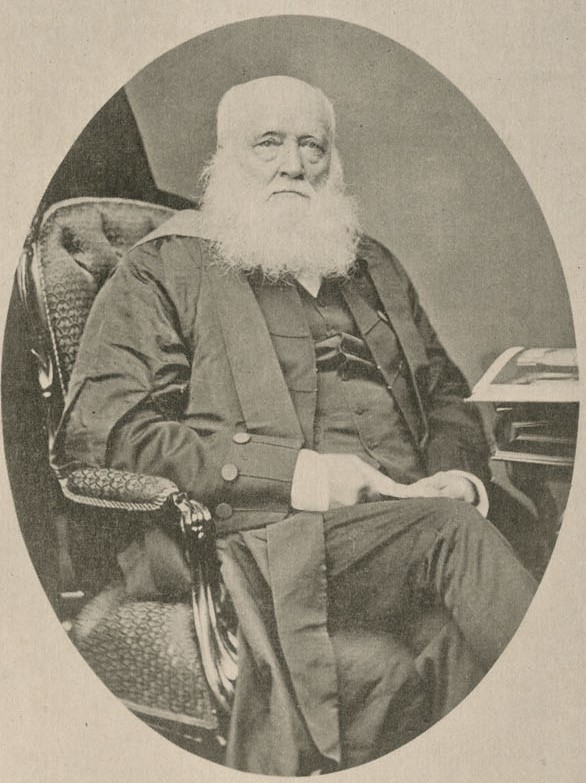
- Rolph, c. 1870

Member of the Legislative Assembly of the Province of Canada for Norfolk County
- In office October 1851 – November 1857
- Preceded by: Henry John Boulton
- Succeeded by: Walker Powell

Member of the Legislative Assembly of Upper Canada for Norfolk County
- In office 20 June 1836 – January 1838 Serving with David Duncombe
- Preceded by: Francis Leigh Walsh
- Succeeded by: William Salmon

Member of the Executive Council of Upper Canada
- In office 20 February 1836 – 12 March 1836

Toronto Alderman for St. Patrick's Ward
- In office 1834

Member of the Legislative Assembly of Upper Canada for Middlesex County
- In office July 1824 – 8 September 1830 Serving with John Matthews

Personal details
- Born: 4 March 1793 Thornbury, Gloucestershire, England
- Died: 19 October 1870 (aged 77) Mitchell, Ontario, Canada
- Spouses: Mary Slatter (m. 1820); Grace Haines (m. 1834)
- Children: 4
- Education: St John's College, Cambridge; Inner Temple; Trinity College, Cambridge
- Profession: Physician, lawyer

John Rolph (4 March 1793 – 19 October 1870) was a Canadian medical doctor, lawyer, and political figure. As a politician, he was considered the leader of the Reform faction in the 1820s and helped plan the Upper Canada Rebellion. As a doctor, he founded several medical schools and incorporated new teaching techniques and medical procedures into his lectures. However, his actions against rival medical schools decreased public confidence in the ability of medical professionals to regulate themselves.

Rolph grew up in England and was educated in medicine and law. He immigrated to Upper Canada in 1813 and lived on his father's farm in Port Talbot, where he practiced law and medicine concurrently and opened a medical school called the Talbot Dispensary. In 1824, Rolph was elected to the Parliament of Upper Canada and returned to England to petition the Colonial Office to allow the naturalization of American citizens in Canada. He was elected as an alderman to Toronto's first city council, though he resigned after his council colleagues did not select him to be the city's mayor.

William Lyon Mackenzie persuaded Rolph to support the Upper Canada Rebellion in 1837. When the rebellion began, Rolph did not join the rebels at their headquarters and the Lieutenant Governor appointed him as his emissary to deliver the government's offer of a truce. Rolph fled to the US after the rebellion and focused on practising and teaching medicine. The Canadian government granted him amnesty and he returned to Canada in 1843, later creating a new medical institution called the Rolph School in Toronto. In 1851 he was elected to the Legislative Assembly of the Province of Canada and focused on his political career; upon the formation of the Morin-MacNab administration three years later, Rolph's priority returned to running his school. He retired as dean of his medical school in 1870 and died later that year after suffering a stroke.

== Early life and education ==
Rolph was born on 4 March 1793, in Thornbury, Gloucestershire. His father was Thomas Rolph, a surgeon from Grovesend. His mother was Frances Petty. Rolph was their fourth child and eldest surviving son. He was baptized at St. Mary's parish church. He moved to Cambridge in 1809 to study law and medicine at St John's College, Cambridge, then transferred to the Inner Temple, London, and Trinity Hall, Cambridge, to study law in 1811.

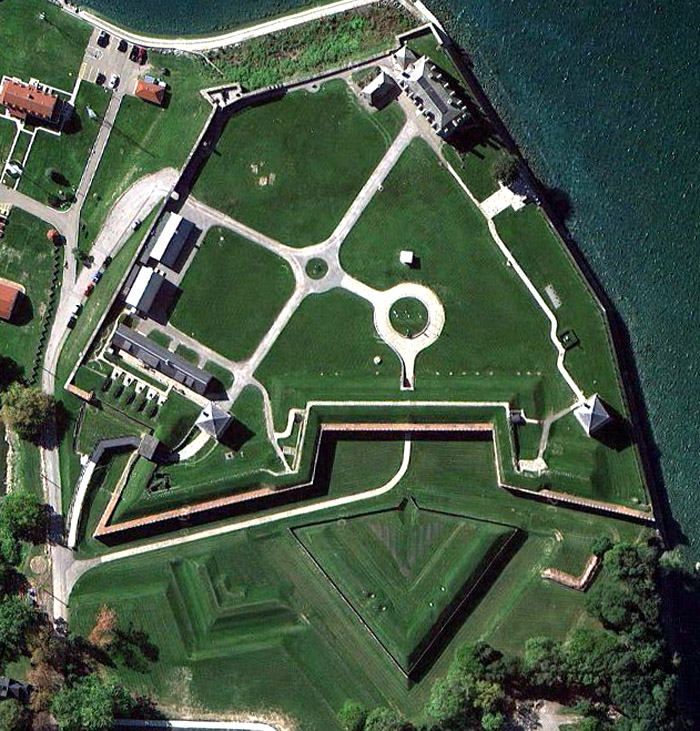
Rolph was suspected of sketching Fort Niagara, pictured here in 2013

In 1812 he travelled to Upper Canada to join his parents, who had emigrated four years prior. The ship he was travelling on was to make port at New York City; while he was crossing the Atlantic Ocean, the War of 1812 began and Rolph received a special passport from American president James Madison to travel to Upper Canada. Rolph went to the Niagara River intending to continue travelling to Canada when it was safe to cross the river. While waiting, he tried to solve one of Euclid's geometry problems; his problem-solving tactic involved drawing shapes. American authorities suspected these were sketches of Fort Niagara and arrested him. He was taken to a prisoner of war camp in Greenbush, New York. While imprisoned, he taught mathematics and grammar to other prisoners to alleviate his boredom. After the 13 October 1812 Battle of Queenston Heights, American forces released him in a prisoner swap with the British and he finished his journey to Canada to live on his father's farm in Port Talbot.

Upon its creation in 1813, Rolph became paymaster for the 2nd Norfolk militia. Rolph was sent by Thomas Talbot, the colonel in charge of the militia, to York to ask for aide from the Upper Canadian government after Americans destroyed most of the mills west of Burlington. Rolph remained employed with the militia after the war, possibly because his family needed the wages to sustain themselves. The deputy inspector of accounts, a British government administrator, accused Rolph of accepting claims from officers who did not provide the appropriate vouchers. Although Rolph denied this accusation, he was considered in default to the government and his application for 800 acres (320 ha) of land as a retired officer was denied. Rolph initiated an organizing committee to honour Thomas Talbot as the founder of Port Talbot and Rolph inaugurated the first celebration of the town's creation on 21 May 1817.

In August 1817, Rolph returned to England to solve financial problems related to his father's estate and to obtain lawyer and medical qualifications. In 1820 he began studying at St John's College in Cambridge. He negotiated payments from his cousin concerning the sale of property in Thornbury that belonged to their families. He used the money to enrol in Guy's Hospital and St Thomas' Hospital to study medicine and to return to study law at Trinity Hall. On 20 April 1820, he married Mary Slatter; although recorded in a wedding register, Rolph never referenced the marriage in his documents.

Rolph was called to the bar at the Inner Temple in 1821. In September he returned to North America, settled in Charlotteville Township, and was called to the bar in Upper Canada. He bought a farm in St. Thomas, and became a barrister. He opened a law office in Vittoria and practised law and medicine concurrently. In 1823 he was elected as a school trustee and moved to Dundas, the following year. He would make frequent visits to York, Upper Canada, and converse with reformers and political figures William Warren Baldwin, Marshall Spring Bidwell, and Robert Baldwin about Upper Canada politics. Rolph dubbed this group "the cabinet". He worked with Charles Duncombe to provide medical services in Upper Canada. In 1823 Rolph and Duncombe opened a medical school called the Talbot Dispensary in St. Thomas. It closed after two years of operation.

== Reform politician ==
Rolph was discontent with the political clique that ruled Upper Canada called the Family Compact, which concentrated political power in the colony to a small group of conservative families. The group's political influence stalled government infrastructure, such as building roads throughout the colony, and made it difficult for those outside the faction to acquire land grants. When in York, Rolph would sometimes visit the home of William Warren Baldwin and speak with other reform-minded politicians. In 1824, Rolph ran for the 9th Parliament of Upper Canada to represent Middlesex County. He campaigned on making land deeds easier to obtain, improving public education, and ensuring that all voters were able to participate in the election. Rolph obtained the highest number of votes and was elected as one of the representatives, with John Matthews elected as the other. In the legislature, Rolph aligned with Reform politicians and was considered their leader in the 1820s.

In 1826, Rolph travelled to England to petition the Colonial Office to naturalize American citizens who had moved to Upper Canada, granting them the right to vote and sit in the Canadian provincial legislature. During this trip he became a member of the Royal College of Surgeons. The British government accepted his petition, and he returned to York in September with guidance on what to include in the legislation to fulfil his request. Rolph proposed a resolution that declared all Americans in Upper Canada to be citizens, legislation that extended citizenship to more Americans than the Colonial Office had intended. Tories delayed passage of the bill until instructions from the Colonial Office arrived and then changed the legislation to support the Office's preferred stipulations, including that Americans had to register with the government before citizenship would be conferred onto them. The amended legislation passed without Rolph's support.

Rolph was re-elected to the legislative assembly in 1828. At the beginning of the legislative session, Rolph introduced a resolution that stated the Parliament did not support the current members of the lieutenant governor's executive council, which passed by a vote of 37 to 1. He served on the Assembly's Committee of Finance, which discovered that Tory politicians and judges were submitting extravagant expenditures. He decided not to run in the 1830 Upper Canada election.

== Return to medicine ==
In 1828, Judge John Walpole Willis ruled that the court of Upper Canada could not determine cases unless all the judges were present. Willis's ruling nullified most of the court's decisions since its establishment in 1794. Judge Levius Peters Sherwood continued to hold hearings and did not express his opinion on Wallis's ruling. Rolph and other lawyers submitted a request to the court for Sherwood to state his opinion on the ruling. When Sherwood refused, Rolph protested in the courtroom by taking off his lawyer's gown. Concerned that this protest would cause judges to become biased against him, Rolph refused new clients. He sold his law practice to his brother George in 1832 and focused on his medical career.

Rolph was licensed to practise medicine in Upper Canada in 1829, although he was practising medicine in the province throughout the 1820s. In 1831, Rolph moved to York to expand his medical practice and incorporate patients in York's hospital into a teaching institution. He was appointed to a medical board upon York's 1831 cholera outbreak. The board appointed Rolph as chairman of a committee to find a place to house patients with serious cases of the disease. In 1832, he opened the only medical school operating in Upper Canada at that time.

== Municipal politics ==
At the beginning of 1833, Rolph was appointed to a committee to examine the incorporation of York to become the city of Toronto. Later that year, he was appointed to a subcommittee that established the boundaries of the city and the five wards that would elect the councillors and aldermen to Toronto's city council. In Toronto's first city council election in 1834, Rolph declined to run on the Reform slate and was endorsed by the Tories to be elected in St. Patrick's ward; the Tories hoped that other Reformers on the council would select Rolph over William Lyon Mackenzie to be the city's first mayor. He was elected as an alderman and councillor for the ward and ran to be Toronto's first mayor, but lost to Mackenzie because the Reform majority on the council wanted Mackenzie to be honoured as the city's first mayor. Rolph resigned from the council after his defeat. In 1834, he married Grace Haines; they had three sons and a daughter. Prior to the 1834 cholera outbreak, Rolph was appointed as a doctor to the reestablished Cholera Hospital. When Toronto declared the outbreak, Rolph was appointed to the board of the Cholera Hospital.

== Return to provincial politics ==
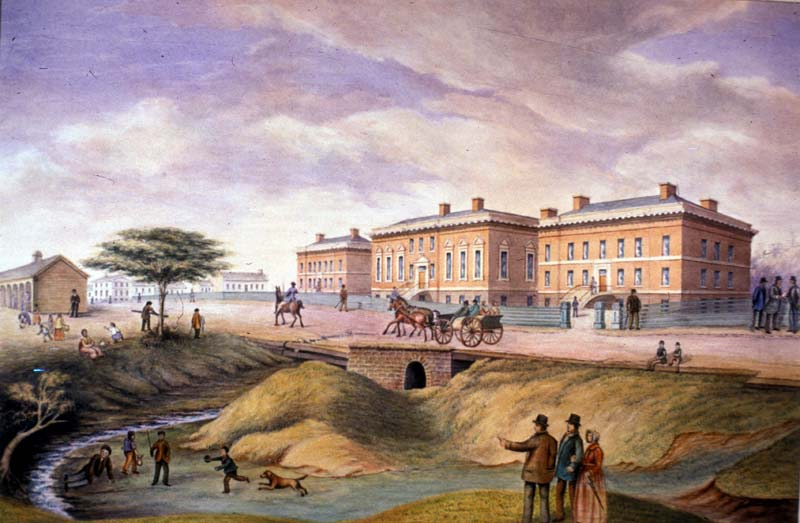
John George Howard's portrait of the third Parliament Building in York, built between 1829 and 1832 at Front Street

Francis Bond Head, the lieutenant governor of Upper Canada, wanted to include moderate reformers on his first Executive Council of Upper Canada. He asked Robert Baldwin to join the council, but Baldwin declined the invitation because he wanted the council's Tory members to be dismissed. Head then invited Rolph for an appointment, as Rolph was also seen as a moderate reformer. Rolph convinced Baldwin and John Henry Dunn to join him on the council. They were appointed as councillors on 20 February 1836. Head made decisions without consulting the council. This led the public to believe the council supported Head's decisions. Rolph led a campaign to have the council support a memorandum that would give more powers and oversight of administration to them. The memorandum was presented to Head on 4 March. Head rejected the memorandum and the entire council resigned on 12 March.

Rolph ran for a seat in the 13th Parliament of Upper Canada in 1836 to represent Norfolk County. He became a candidate because he believed he had reestablished his political career when he joined the executive council. He did not campaign in the constituency but was elected with the largest margin among Reform candidates, while David Duncombe was elected the other legislator from Norfolk. He was one of the few Reformers elected to the legislative assembly in that year and led the Reform party in Parliament.

Rolph submitted objections to Head's tactics in the previous election to the legislature, so lawmakers formed a Committee of Enquiry to investigate, which concluded that the charges could not be upheld against Head. Rolph called the report biased, pointing out that Reform witnesses did not testify before the committee and the committee's chair did not attach appendixes to the report, which would have outlined the evidence that supported the report's claims. He criticized Head for inflaming divisions between Upper Canadian people based on nationality instead of uniting the people as Canadians.

== Upper Canada Rebellion ==
=== Planning ===
On 28 July 1837, radical reformers planned a congress to address grievances against the Upper Canada government and appointed Rolph as a congress delegate. He did not attend the meeting, but might have drafted a declaration outlining the reasons why a rebellion in Upper Canada was justified. His views on the meeting or a rebellion at that moment were not published or written down.

In November 1837, the Patriote movement in Lower Canada sent a letter stating they were starting the Lower Canada Rebellion and encouraged the Upper Canadian reformers to begin the Upper Canada Rebellion. Mackenzie spoke with Rolph to convince him to support an armed rebellion and suggested that he would become president of the State of Upper Canada upon the rebellion's success. Rolph agreed to the rebellion under three conditions: that there was support for the rebellion in the colony, that its leader be someone with military experience, and that Rolph would have limited involvement until the rebellion was successful.

Rolph joined the rebellion to bring more independence to the legislature which would then more closely resemble the British governance system. He was hesitant to immediately begin the rebellion and wanted to survey support in rural areas. He sent Mackenzie north of Toronto to determine the level of support among farmers. Having learned Mackenzie planned to hold the rebellion in December, Rolph insisted that Anthony Van Egmond, a retired military officer from the Napoleonic Wars, should lead the military operation.

=== Rebellion and flight to the US ===
On 2 December 1837, Rolph learned the government was going to arrest Mackenzie. He sent a message to warn him and suggested starting the rebellion on 4 December. Samuel Lount received the message and told the rebels to gather in Montgomery's Tavern north of Toronto to begin the rebellion. Rebel leaders met on 4 December. After learning that the Lower Canada Rebellion had failed, Rolph advised abandoning their plan and dispersing the assembled troops. The other leaders convinced him to support the plan and Rolph returned to Toronto.

On 5 December, Head appointed Rolph and Robert Baldwin as emissaries of the government to deliver a truce to the rebels. Rolph accepted the appointment because others who refused to help the government were suspected of supporting the rebels, and he did not want the government to suspect his involvement. Rolph and Baldwin convinced the rebels to stop their march towards Toronto and relayed Head's offer of amnesty. They returned to Head with the rebels' counter-offer, but Head refused further negotiations. The two men returned to the rebels to relay Head's response. Rolph met with Lount and Mackenzie separately and encouraged them to march towards the city immediately. Rolph spent the rest of the evening recruiting men in Toronto to meet the rebels upon their arrival. The rebels retreated to Montgomery's Tavern after a skirmish with government troops. Rolph abandoned his recruitment efforts and dispersed the men he had gathered. He sent a messenger to the rebels in Montgomery's Tavern calling for an end to the rebellion.

Thomas David Morrison, another reformer who organized the rebellion, was arrested on 6 December by the Upper Canadian government. Rolph feared the government would also arrest him, so he fled for the United States that same day. Troops travelling towards Toronto stopped and questioned Rolph near the Credit River. Rolph showed them a letter stating his sister was ill and claimed he was travelling to give her medical attention. The next day he arrived in Lewiston, New York. On 11 December, Head issued a proclamation and £500 (equivalent to £61,778 in 2024) reward for Rolph's arrest. Rolph was expelled from the Upper Canada legislature on 20 January 1838 for helping to plan the rebellion and replaced by William Salmon the following month.

== Years in the US ==
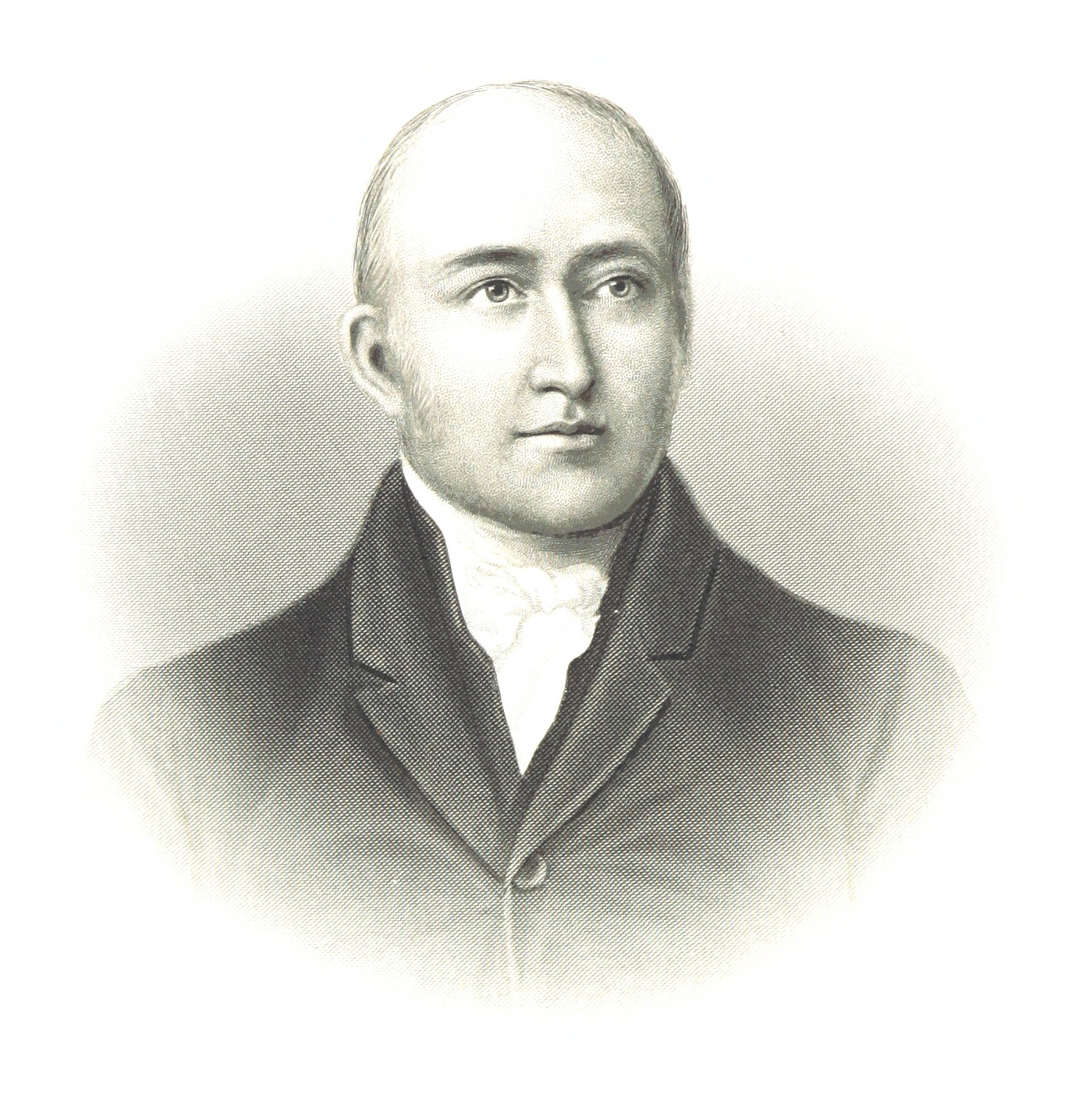
A portrait of Rolph at age 45

On 12 December 1837, Rolph and Mackenzie recruited Rensselaer Van Rensselaer to lead American volunteers, calling themselves Patriots, in an Upper Canada invasion. Rolph promised rebels would not interfere with Van Rensselaer's military operations, while Van Rensselaer claimed Rolph was president of the Executive Council for the Upper Canadian uprising. Rolph consented to have his name added to Mackenzie's State of Upper Canada proclamation as an endorser.

When the Patriots invaded and occupied Navy Island, Rolph joined a committee to visit the island and speak with Van Rensselaer on 26 December. The committee concluded Patriot forces, consisting of American members of Hunters' Lodges, were disorganized and Rolph rejected Mackenzie's appointment to be the Patriots' treasurer. He distanced himself from the Patriots to focus on his medical career. When the Patriots failed to invade Upper Canada, Mackenzie wrote an article in his newspaper accusing Rolph of sabotaging the Upper Canada Rebellion. Rolph wrote a rebuttal and attempted to publish it in a periodical called The United States Magazine and Democratic Review. The publisher rejected Rolph's submission, citing concerns that a reader would need background knowledge of the rebellion to understand Rolph's story. This rebuttal was found among Rolph's papers after his death and published by John Charles Dent in his book Upper Canada Rebellion.

In 1838, Rolph received an honorary membership to the Monroe County Medical Society, which allowed him to practise medicine without completing an examination. He reopened his medical school in Rochester, New York, and many of the students he was teaching in Toronto moved to Rochester to continue their education.

== Return to Canada ==
=== Medical practice ===
Rolph was received amnesty in 1843 and returned to Toronto in August. He renovated the rear portion of his house into a dissecting room and held medical lectures there. In January 1844 he reestablished his medical school. Initially called the Rolph School, an Act of Legislature in 1851 incorporated it as the Toronto School of Medicine. He advertised the school as an alternative to the university education students could receive at King's College in Toronto.

In 1848, Rolph worked with the board of commissioners of the Provincial Lunatic Asylum to successfully dismiss their medical superintendent Walter Tefler. Rolph encouraged the board to hire George Park, his protege and brother-in-law. In August, Rolph became the temporary superintendent of the asylum after Park took a leave of absence. Rolph suspended a keeper named Mr. Hungerford for falsely accusing staff members of abusing patients. The board reinstated the keeper. This created conflict between Park and the board, who repeatedly fired Hungerford, only to have the board reverse the dismissal. The Executive Council dismissed Park and the new director reversed Park's and Rolph's policies.

In 1850, the public criticized the Medical Board of Upper Canada for giving medical licenses only to those who had graduated from a university but were failing qualified candidates from the Toronto School of Medicine. To alleviate these concerns, Rolph and other doctors from his school were appointed to the board. Rolph was appointed president of a sub-committee to improve the effectiveness of the board. Many of Rolph's and his allies' suggestions, such as petitioning the legislature to incorporate the medical profession in Upper Canada, and barring teachers from examining their students for their medical license, were not adopted.

=== Return to politics ===
In 1849, the Parliament of the Province of Canada passed the Rebellion Losses Bill, which compensated citizens who had lost property during the Upper and Lower Canada Rebellions. Citizens in Toronto opposed to the bill rioted. They believed it would financially compensate participants in the rebellions and blamed Reformers, including Rolph, for its passage. Rolph's family hid while rioters threw rocks through the windows of his house. In 1851, he was elected to represent Norfolk County in the Legislative Assembly of the Province of Canada and withdrew from running the administrative tasks of his medical school.

Francis Hincks, a co-premier of Canada, appointed Rolph as Minister of Crown Lands. Rolph successfully defended himself against critiques of the handling of timber-cutting licences near Peterborough. He was accused of stealing funds from the Treasury, but Rolph said he was using the money to pay moving expenses for his relocation to the Province of Canada's capital, reimbursement that was given to his predecessors. William Henry Boulton, a Tory legislator, accused Rolph of encouraging an attack on Toronto when he brought Head's truce to the rebels during the Upper Canada Rebellion. Boulton used Lount's testimony of the event to support his claims. Mackenzie published similar accusations in his newspaper because he wanted to defend Lount's reputation. This caused a rift in Rolph and Mackenzie's relationship, although the event attracted little attention in other newspapers.

In August 1853, Rolph became the president of the Council and Minister of Agriculture. He proposed a bill called the Act for the Better Management of the Provincial Lunatic Asylum, which transferred various decision-making powers from the board of directors to the medical superintendent. It became law in 1853. Rolph convinced Hincks to withdraw government financing of the University of Toronto's medical faculty. Rolph resented the centralization of education in the province and wanted to reduce funding to rival medical schools. Hincks was accused of buying debentures for the Toronto, Simcoe and Huron Railway, then using Toronto city funding to bail out the railway, thus making £10,000 in profit. Reformers encouraged Rolph to resign from Hincks's cabinet and assume leadership of the party. Initially, Rolph supported Hincks to avoid fracturing the Reform party, but withdrew his support in 1854, causing the collapse of the government and an election.

In the 1854 election, Rolph was reelected with 55% of the vote. Augustin-Norbert Morin abandoned his alliance with Hincks and instead formed a coalition government with Upper Canadian Tories led by Allan MacNab. Rolph opposed this new coalition because the Tories would oppose Reformer policies. A Tory legislator named John Langton tried to discredit Rolph's opinion by speaking about the Head truce, but Rolph rebutted those comments with a prepared speech that outlined his account of the event.

=== Focus on medical career ===
Upon the formation of the Morin-MacNab administration, Rolph's attendance in the legislature declined as he focused on his medical career. In 1854, the Toronto School of Medicine merged with Victoria College to become Victoria College's medical school. The medical staff at the school clashed with Rolph's autocratic leadership style, and opposed moving the school to a new location in the Yorkville neighbourhood in Toronto. They brought their grievances to the college's board of directors, but the board sided with Rolph and the medical staff resigned en masse. The college's students remained at Victoria College, and he remained dean of its medical faculty. He taught all the courses for the first two weeks of the school year while recruiting new faculty members. In 1856, the former staff established their own medical school and called it Toronto School of Medicine. Rolph attempted to advertise his school as "the medical department of Victoria College – The Toronto School of Medicine". His former staff successfully sued Rolph and stopped him from using the Toronto School of Medicine branding.

He declined to run in the 1857 legislative election and became chairman of the Medical Board. He continued to teach various topics at the medical school and hire other faculty members. In 1868, Rolph was appointed to the medical staff of the newly reopened Toronto General Hospital. He clashed with other board members from the Toronto School of Medicine. To end the conflict, the hospital stopped all clinical lectures on their property.

== Retirement and death ==
Rolph suffered a minor stroke in 1861 and lost the function of his right arm. In 1870, he was in declining health, so Victoria College appointed William Canniff as a sub-Dean to help administer the school. Rolph did not accept Canniff's help and retired from the position. That summer, he had several minor strokes and lived with his daughter and her husband in Mitchell, Ontario. He suffered another stroke and died in Mitchell on 19 October 1870. He was buried in Trinity Church in Toronto on 22 October.

== Philosophy and views ==
=== Religious beliefs ===
Rolph was a member of the Church of England. He believed religious institutions deteriorated when government money supported them. Rolph's medical school did not require faculty or students to join a particular religion or denomination.

Rolph was initially supportive of clergy reserves since they supported his Anglican faith financially. His position changed as he observed the reserves were preventing land development in Canada. Rolph opposed an 1825 bill that would have expanded clergy reserves to other Christian denominations because of its vague language concerning who could claim the land. He feared ten people could create a congregation, claim land for religious purposes, then sell it for a profit. In 1837, he denounced clergy reserves because he thought a close connection between a religious institution and a political government deteriorated the former's religious integrity. Rolph kept this opinion when he returned to Canada, denouncing clergy reserves in the Canadian legislature in 1852.

The Church of England controlled King's College, and Rolph wanted it turned into a secular institution. He opposed government funding for its medical faculty at the exclusion of others and advocated for institutions to train lawyers and doctors without government funding. If funding was to be provided by the government, he wanted it to be available to all medical schools through endowments.

=== Medical views ===
Rolph sought the latest medical trends in North America and Europe while practising medicine. He cited these trends when teaching at his school but also gave counterarguments to the theories presented in his lectures. His research focused on the structure of organisms, and he was willing to research ideas that were considered fringe. Rolph did not focus research attention or his curriculum on studying the causes and effects of diseases or diagnosing patients. He experimented on animals to understand how the body reacts when approaching death. Rolph incorporated a French style of teaching medicine in which he treated patients at a hospital in front of his students. In lectures at the end of his life, Rolph still taught older remedies to his students, including bloodletting.

=== Political views ===
Throughout his political career, Rolph aligned with the Reform movement, with the historian John Muggeridge calling him an "advanced reformer". During the 1830s, more radical members of the Reform movement such as William Lyon Mackenzie were frustrated with Rolph's more moderate views. In defending his position, Rolph stated that he agreed with the Reform movement's principles and questioned the benefits of the more radical opinions of some of their members. Thus, Rolph was seen as a more moderate Reformer, which helped him get elected in the 1836 election while most Reformers were defeated. Although he supported reform causes, his status and wealth would cause him to benefit more from keeping the political status quo. He believed that if liberal positions were adopted, God would succeed against the negative consequences and influence of wealth.

== Legacy ==
=== Historical reputation ===
Marian A. Patterson described Rolph as the "Father of Medical Education in Upper Canada". The Act for the Better Management of the Provincial Lunatic Asylum bill that he proposed was part of a wider trend to transfer control of asylums away from ordinary members of society and towards medical professionals. However, his disputes with other medical schools and factions caused public trust of medical professionals and their ability to regulate themselves to decrease. His contemporaries highlighted his abilities as a researcher and public speaker but also accused him of lying and manipulating facts. Rolph used his reputation and political influence to control the governing councils of the Toronto hospitals and the medical licensing body of Upper Canada.

As a politician, Rolph's contemporaries had conflicting views on his actions. James Lesslie and Jesse Ketchum wanted to commission a portrait of Rolph in 1837 as a reward for his service, while Jonas Jones said he possessed a "vile and democratic heart". He could contemplate multiple perspectives on an issue and easily persuaded others to agree with his perspective. In his book on the Upper Canada Rebellion, John Charles Dent praised Rolph's actions and criticized William Lyon Mackenzie's leadership. Mackenzie's sons-in-law Charles Lindsey and John King published critiques of Dent's book that disputed Rolph's influence in the rebellion. Historians have struggled to write about Rolph because he rarely described his personal feelings to others and wrote few documents expressing his political opinions.

=== In memoriam ===
A portrait of Rolph, painted in 1836, hangs in the library of the Academy of Medicine of Toronto. Rolph's pocket watch, given to him by a co-worker during the Upper Canada Rebellion, is displayed under the portrait. Rolph Road Public School in Leaside, a neighbourhood in Toronto, was named for Rolph and opened in 1939.

== Works cited ==
- Armstrong, Frederick Henry (1985). Handbook of Upper Canadian Chronology. Toronto: Dundurn Press. ISBN 978-1-55488-183-3.
- Baehre, Rainer (1995). "The Medical Profession in Upper Canada Reconsidered: Politics, Medical Reform, and Law in a Colonial Society". Canadian Bulletin of Medical History. 12 (1): 101–124. doi:10.3138/cbmh.12.1.101. ISSN 0823-2105. PMID 11609091.
- Bilson, Geoffrey (1980). A Darkened House: Cholera in Nineteenth-Century Canada. Toronto: University of Toronto Press. ISBN 978-0-8020-2367-4.
- Craig, Gerald M. (1963). Upper Canada: the Formative Years 1784–1841. Toronto: McClelland and Stewart. ISBN 978-0-7710-2311-8.
- Craig, G. M. (1976). "Rolph, John". Dictionary of Canadian Biography. Vol. 9. University of Toronto/Université Laval. Archived from the original on 17 January 2021.
- Duffin, Jacalyn (1990). "In View of the Body of Job Broom: A Glimpse of the Medical Knowledge and Practice of John Rolph". Canadian Bulletin of Medical History. 7 (1): 9–30. doi:10.3138/cbmh.7.1.9. ISSN 0823-2105. PMID 11622357.
- Dunham, Aileen (1963). Political Unrest in Upper Canada, 1815–1836. Toronto: McClelland & Stewart. ISBN 978-0-8371-7474-7.
- Dunlop, Joseph (2006). "Politics, Patronage and Scandal at the Provincial Lunatic Asylum, 1848–1857". Ontario History. 98 (2): 183–208. doi:10.7202/1065825ar. ISSN 0030-2953.
- Forbes, James (2016). "Contesting the Protestant Consensus: Voluntarists, Methodists, and the Persistence of Evangelical Dissent in Upper Canada, 1829–1854". Ontario History. 108 (2): 189–214. doi:10.7202/1050594ar. ISSN 0030-2953.
- Gates, Lillian F. (1996). After the Rebellion: The Later Years of William Lyon Mackenzie. Toronto: Dundurn Press. ISBN 978-1-55488-069-0.
- Godfrey, Charles (1993). John Rolph: Rebel with Causes. Madoc, Ontario: Condam Publishing. ISBN 0-921453-04-3.
- Gryfe, A. (1975). "Dr. John Rolph – Physician, Lawyer and Rebel". Canadian Medical Association Journal. 113 (10): 971–974. ISSN 0008-4409. PMC 1956571. PMID 1104128.
- Johnson, J. K. (1989). Becoming Prominent: Regional Leadership in Upper Canada, 1791–1841. Kingston: McGill-Queen's University Press. ISBN 0-7735-0641-1.
- Kett, Joseph F. (1967). "American and Canadian Medical Institutions, 1800–1870". Journal of the History of Medicine and Allied Sciences. 22 (4): 343–356. doi:10.1093/jhmas/XXII.4.343. ISSN 0022-5045. JSTOR 24621810.
- Kilbourn, William Morley (1967). The Firebrand: William Lyon Mackenzie and the Rebellion in Upper Canada. Toronto: Clarke, Irwin & Company. ISBN 978-1-77070-324-7.
- Mills, David (1988). The Idea of Loyalty in Upper Canada, 1784–1850. Kingston, Ontario: McGill-McQueen's University Press. ISBN 978-0-7735-0660-2.
- Muggeridge, John (1959). "John Rolph – A Reluctant Rebel". Ontario History. 51 (4): 217–229. ISSN 0030-2953.
- Osgoode Society for Canadian Legal History (1996). Greenwood, F. Murray; Wright, Barry (eds.). Canadian State Trials: Rebellion and Invasion in the Canadas, 1837–1839. Toronto: University of Toronto Press. ISBN 978-0-8020-3748-0.
- Patterson, Marian A. (1961). "The Life and Times of the Hon. John Rolph, M.D. (1793–1870)". Medical History. 5 (1): 15–33. doi:10.1017/S0025727300025898. ISSN 2048-8343. PMC 1034582. PMID 13733371.
- Pitfield, Jane (2000). Leaside. Toronto: Natural Heritage Books. ISBN 978-1-896219-54-7.
- Read, Colin (1982). The Rising in Western Upper Canada, 1837–8: The Duncombe Revolt and After. Toronto: University of Toronto Press. ISBN 978-0-8020-5498-2.
- Read, Colin Frederick (23 September 2004). "Rolph, John". Oxford Dictionary of National Biography (online ed.). Oxford University Press. doi:10.1093/ref:odnb/24033. (Subscription, Wikipedia Library access or UK public library membership required.)
- Schrauwers, Albert (2009). 'Union Is Strength': W. L. Mackenzie, The Children of Peace and the Emergence of Joint Stock Democracy in Upper Canada. Toronto: University of Toronto Press. ISBN 978-1-4426-9327-2.
- Sewell, John (2002). Mackenzie: a Political Biography of William Lyon Mackenzie. Toronto: James Lorimer Limited. ISBN 978-1-55028-767-7. Archived from the original on 5 January 2021.
