= Constance Backhouse =

Canadian legal scholar and historian

- Born: Constance Barbara Backhouse; February 19, 1952 (age 74); Winnipeg, Manitoba
- Occupation: Professor
- Awards: Order of Canada; Order of Ontario

Constance Barbara Backhouse, CM OOnt FRSC (born February 19, 1952) is a Canadian legal scholar and historian, specializing in gender and race discrimination. She is a Distinguished University Professor and University Research Chair at the Faculty of Law, University of Ottawa in Ottawa, Canada. In addition to her academic publications, Backhouse is the author of several books on feminist- and race-related legal rights topics. Backhouse is President of the American Society for Legal History, and is the first non-US scholar to hold this position.

== Career ==
A graduate of the University of Manitoba, Constance Backhouse received her law education at Osgoode Hall Law School (York University), and Harvard University. She taught law at the University of Western Ontario, and has taught at the University of Ottawa since 2000.

Backhouse has served as an expert witness and consultant on sexual abuse and violence against women and children. She was the co-author of one of the first books in North America on workplace sexual harassment. She has been an adjudicator for high-profile legal cases for the compensation claims arising from the physical, sexual and psychological abuse of the former inmates of the Grandview Training School for Girls (1995–98), and claims for the former students of Aboriginal residential schools (Canadian Indian residential school system) across Canada.

She is a member of the board of directors for the Claire L'Heureux-Dubé Fund for Social Justice and the Women's Education and Research Foundation. She is a Founding Co-Editor of the Feminist History Society, established in 2010 to publish a series of books exploring feminism in Canada and Quebec between 1960 and 2010. As of 2011, Backhouse is working on a biography of Madame Justice Claire L'Heureux-Dubé, as well as a book about 100 Canadian feminist lawyers who entered the profession during the 1970s and 1980s.

== Stance on national standard for law schools ==
While a member of the Licensing and Accreditation Task Force of the Law Society of Upper Canada, Constance Backhouse opposed a 2010 recommendation passed by the LSUC regarding a national standard being established for Canadian law schools. Backhouse proposed a regulatory regime based on a "consensual, consultative" approach:

The unintended result of the new mandatory competencies is that the social justice curriculum will suffer. Elective courses in poverty law, access to justice, feminist legal issues, critical race theory, disability law and others already face difficult battles for student enrolment. These important public interest areas of the curriculum will be further impoverished to make way for the growth in the list of mandatory competencies.

== Awards and recognition ==
- Recipient of the Governor General's Awards in Commemoration of the Persons Case (2013).
- Member of the Order of Ontario (2010)
- Killam Prize in Social Sciences (2008)
- Member of the Order of Canada (2008)
- Jules and Gabrielle Léger Fellowship (2006)
- Trudeau Fellowship (2006)
- Ramon Hnatyshyn Award from the Canadian Bar Association (2006)
- Fellow of the Royal Society of Canada (2004)
- Honorary doctorate (2002) and law society medal (1998) from the Law Society of Upper Canada
- Bora Laskin Human Rights Fellowship (1999)
- Joseph Brant Award for multicultural history (2002)
- Willard Hurst Prize in legal history (1992)
- Gustavus Myers award for books about human rights (1993)
- Both research and teaching awards at the University of Ottawa
- Augusta Stowe-Gullen Medal (1981) for her feminist activist work

== Bibliography ==
=== Books ===
- Carnal Crimes: Sexual Assault Law in Canada, 1900–1975, Constance Backhouse. Irwin Law: September 2008, 442 pgs. ISBN 978-1-55221-151-9
- The Heiress Vs The Establishment: Mrs. Campbell's Campaign For Legal Justice (Law & Society), Constance Backhouse and Nancy L. Backhouse. Univ of British Columbia Press: August 30, 2005, 321 pp. ISBN 978-0-7748-1053-1
- Colour-Coded: A Legal History of Racism in Canada, 1900-1950. Constance Backhouse. University of Toronto Press: November 20, 1999, 432 pp. ISBN 978-0-8020-8286-2
- Challenging Times: Women's Movements in Canada and the United States. Constance Backhouse. McGill-Queen's University Press: 1992, 335 pp. ISBN 978-0-7735-0919-1
- The Secret Oppression: Sexual Harassment of Working Women. Constance Backhouse. Macmillan: 1979, 208 pp. ISBN 978-0-7705-1789-2
- People and Place: Historical Influences on Legal Culture (Law & Society) Jonathan Swainger (Editor), Constance Backhouse (Editor), University of British Columbia Press, 2003, 288 pp. ISBN 978-0-7748-1032-6
- Petticoats & Prejudice: Women and Law in Nineteenth Century Canada. Constance Backhouse. Women's Press, 1991. 470 pp. ISBN 978-0-88961-161-0

=== Other publications ===
- List of Constance Backhouse publications, includes numerous downloadable articles

=== Selected articles ===
- The Celebrated Abortion Trial of Dr. Emily Stowe, Toronto, 1879, Constance B. Backhouse, Canadian Bulletin of Medical History, Volume 8: 1991 / p. 159-87
- "Pleasing Appearance . . . Only Adds to the Danger": The 1930 Insanity Hearing of Violet Hypatia Bowyer, Constance Backhouse, Canadian Journal of Women and the Law, Volume 17, Number 1, 2005, pp. 1–13
- "Remembering Favourite Feminist Legal Scholarship" Backhouse, Constance. Buss, Doris. Way, Rosemary Cairns. Gilbert, Daphne. Et al. Canadian Journal of Women and the Law, Volume 17, Number 1, 2005, pp. 243–270
