= Susan Boyd =

Canadian feminist legal scholar

Susan B. Boyd
- Education: Bishop's University (B.A.; 1975); McGill University (LL.B.; 1978); University of London (LL.M.; 1982); University of Amsterdam (D.E.I.; 1979)
- Notable work: Autonomous Motherhood? A Socio-Legal Study of Choice and Constraint (University of Toronto Press, 2015) (with D Chunn, F Kelly and W Wiegers)
- Title: Professor Emerita at UBC

Susan B. Boyd is a Canadian feminist legal scholar. She was the inaugural Chair in Feminist Legal Studies, and founder of the Centre for Feminist Legal Studies, and is Professor Emerita at UBC. She conducted research in the fields of feminist legal theory, law and gender, law and sexuality, parenthood law, child custody law and law and social justice. In 2012, Professor Boyd was elected a Fellow of the Royal Society of Canada, in recognition of her international reputation as a leading socio-legal scholar.

== Education ==
Boyd attended Bishop's University (B.A.; 1975), McGill University (LL.B.; 1978), the University of London (LL.M.; 1982) and the University of Amsterdam (D.E.I.; 1979).

== Career ==
Boyd taught at Carleton University's Department of Law in Ottawa and then joined the Allard School of Law in 1992. At UBC, she held the endowed research Chair in Feminist Legal Studies from 1992 to 2015. She was the founding Director of the Centre for Feminist Legal Studies from 2007 to 2012. She retired on June 30, 2015 but continues her relationship with UBC as Professor Emerita.

Professor Boyd’s research and publications were on feminist legal theory, and gender and sexuality issues in the fields of family law, especially child custody and parenthood law. In 2007, she co-edited Reaction and Resistance: Feminism, Law, and Social Change and Poverty: Rights, Social Citizenship and Legal Activism. Law and Families appeared in 2006. Her book Child Custody, Law, and Women's Work was published in 2003. Canadian Feminist Literature on Law: An Annotated Bibliography appeared in 1999. Challenging the Public/Private Divide: Feminism, Law, and Public Policy was published in 1997. Her 2015 book Autonomous Motherhood? A Socio-Legal Study of Choice and Constraint addresses legal parenthood and the possibilities of and constraints on autonomous motherhood.

Professor Boyd was a long-standing member of the editorial board of the Canadian Journal of Women and the Law and has been on several other editorial or advisory boards. She also works for feminist law reform and is a member of organizations that work for social change. She was on the Board of Directors of the Women's Legal Education and Action Fund (LEAF).

In 2012, Professor Boyd was elected a Fellow of the Royal Society of Canada, the highest honour a scholar can achieve in the Arts, Humanities and Sciences, in recognition of her international reputation as a leading socio-legal scholar who has made exceptional contributions to family law and feminist legal studies. Other awards included a Faculty Scholar Award (2010) and an Alumni Award for Research (2008).

== Select works ==
=== Books ===
- Autonomous Motherhood? A Socio-Legal Study of Choice and Constraint (U. Toronto Press, 2007)(with D Chunn, F Kelly and W Wiegers)
- Law and Families, International Library of Essays in Law and Society (edited with H. Rhoades) (Ashgate 2006)
- Child Custody, Law, and Women's Work (Toronto: Oxford University Press, 2003)
- Challenging the Public/Private Divide: Feminism, Law, and Public Policy (University of Toronto Press, 1997).
- Reaction and Resistance: Feminism, Law, and Social Change (with D. Chunn and H. Lessard) (UBC Press, 2007)

=== Articles ===
- “Family Law Reform in (Neoliberal) Context: British Columbia's New Family Law Act”, (2014) 28:1 International Journal of Law, Policy and the Family 77-99 (with R. Treloar).
- “‘Marriage is More Than Just a Piece of Paper’: Feminist Critiques of Same Sex Marriage.” (2013) 8(2) National Taiwan University Law Review 263-298
- "Still Gendered after all this Time? Care and Autonomy in Child Custody Debates" in N Priaulx and A Wrigley, eds., Ethics, Law, and Society vol V: Ethics of Care, Body Politics, Theorising the Ethical and Governance (Ashgate, 2012), 69–90.
- "Spaces and Challenges: Feminism in Legal Academia" (2011) 44(1) UBC Law Review 205-220
- "Relocation, indeterminacy, and burden of proof: lessons from Canada" (2011) 23(2) Child and Family Law Qtly 155–177.
- "Joint Custody and Guardianship in the British Columbia Courts: Not a Cautious Approach" (2010) 29 Canadian Family Law Quarterly 223–252.
- "Autonomy for Mothers? Relational Theory and Parenting Apart" (2010) 18(2) Feminist Legal Studies 137–158.
- "Is Equality Enough? Fathers' Rights and Women's Rights Advocacy." In Rethinking Equality Projects in Law: Feminist Challenges, edited by Rosemary Hunter, 59–79. Oxford: Hart Publishing, 2008, Onati International Series in Law and Society.
- "Gendering Legal Parenthood: Bio-Genetic Ties, Intentionality and Responsibility." (2007) 25 Windsor Yearbook of Access to Justice 55–85.
- "Losing the Feminist Voice? Debates on the Legal Recognition of Same Sex Partnerships in Canada." (2006) 14 Feminist Legal Studies 213-240 (with C. Young).
- "Canadian Feminist Literature on Law: An Annotated Bibliography", (1999) 11 Canadian Journal of Women and the Law.
- "Who Influences Family Law Reform? Discourses on Motherhood and Fatherhood in Legislative Reform Debates in Canada" (2002) 26 Studies in Law, Politics, and Society 43-75 (with C. Young)
