= 9th Parliament of Upper Canada =

Parliament for Upper Canada 1825–1828

The 9th Parliament of Upper Canada was opened 12 January 1825. Elections in Upper Canada had been held in July 1824. All sessions were held at York, Upper Canada. This parliament was dissolved 24 June 1828.

The House of Assembly of the 9th Parliament of Upper Canada had four sessions 13 January 1825 to 25 March 1828:

Both the House of Assembly and the Parliament sat at York General Hospital.

Sessions	Start	End
1st	13 January 1825	13 April 1825
2nd	7 November 1825	30 January 1826
3rd	5 December 1826	17 February 1827
4th	15 January 1828	25 March 1828

== Members ==
Riding	Member	First elected/ previously elected	No. of terms
Carleton	George Thew Burke	1824	1st term
Dundas	John Crysler	1804, 1812, 1824	4th term*
Durham	George Strange Boulton	1824	1st term
Durham	Charles Fothergill (Nov 1825)	1825	1st term
Essex	John Alexander Wilkinson	1824	1st term
Essex	François Baby	1820	2nd term
Frontenac	Hugh Christopher Thomson	1824	1st term
Frontenac	James Atkinson	1824	1st term
Glengarry	Alexander Macdonell of Greenfield	1820	2nd term
Glengarry	Duncan Cameron	1824	1st term
Grenville	Jonas Jones	1816	3rd term
Grenville	Hamilton Walker	1824	1st term
Halton	Richard Beasley	1796, 1808, 1824	4th term*
Halton	William Scollick	1824	1st term
Hastings	Rueben White	1820	2nd term
Kent	James Gordon	1820	2nd term
Kingston	John Cumming	1824	1st term
Lanark	William Morris	1820	2nd term
Leeds	Charles Jones	1820	2nd term
Leeds	David Jones	1824	1st term
Lennox & Addington	Marshall Spring Bidwell	1824	1st term
Lennox & Addington	Peter Perry	1824	1st term
1st Lincoln County	John Clarke	1824	1st term
2nd & 3rd Lincoln	Bartholomew Crannell Beardsley	1824	1st term
2nd & 3rd Lincoln	John Johnston Lefferty	1824	1st term
4th Lincoln	Robert Randal	1820	2nd term
Middlesex	John Rolph	1824	1st term
Middlesex	John Matthews	1824	1st term
Niagara (town)	Edward William McBride	1824	1st term
Norfolk	Francis Leigh Walsh	1820	2nd term
Norfolk	Duncan McCall	1824	1st term
Northumberland	Zacheus Burnham	1824	1st term
Northumberland	James Lyons	1824	1st term
Northumberland	Benjamin Ewing	1824	1st term
Oxford	Thomas Hornor	1820	2nd term
Oxford	Charles Fortescue Ingersoll	1824	1st term
Prescott & Russell	Donald Macdonell	1824	1st term
Prince Edward	James Wilson	1820	2nd term
Prince Edward	Paul Peterson	1820	2nd term
Stormont	Archibald McLean	1820	2nd term
Stormont	Philip VanKoughnet	1816	3rd term
Wentworth	George Hamilton	1820	2nd term
Wentworth	John Willson – Speaker 1825–1828	1820	2nd term
York (town)	Sir John Robinson, 1st Baronet, of Toronto	1820	2nd term
York & Simcoe	William Thompson	1824	1st term
York & Simcoe	Ely Playter	1824	1st term

== See also ==
- Legislative Council of Upper Canada
- Executive Council of Upper Canada
- Legislative Assembly of Upper Canada
- Lieutenant Governors of Upper Canada, 1791-1841
- Historical federal electoral districts of Canada
- List of Ontario provincial electoral districts
