= Mandryk =

Mandryk is a surname. Notable people with the surname include:

- Nataliia Mandryk (born 1988), Ukrainian Paralympic wheelchair fencer
- Regan Mandryk (born 1975), American computer science professor
