= Playter Estates =

- Neighbourhood
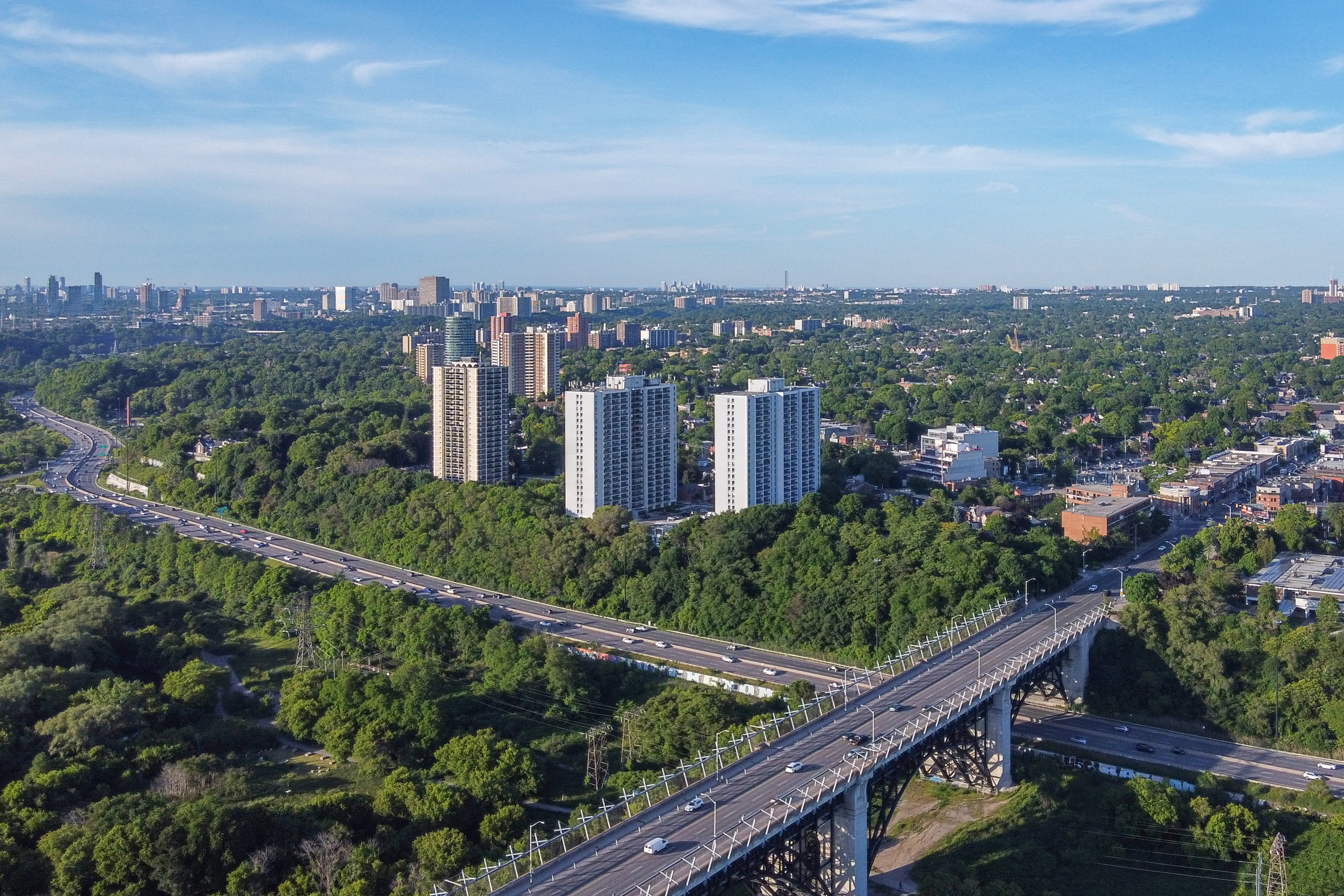
- Aerial view of Playter Estates in 2024

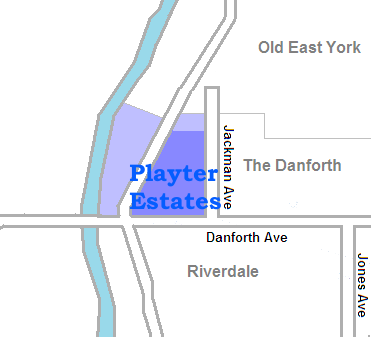
- Vicinity

- Location within Toronto
- Coordinates: 43°40′41″N 79°21′20″W
- Country: Canada
- Province: Ontario
- City: Toronto

Playter Estates is an area in the east end of Toronto, Ontario, Canada bounded by Pape Avenue to the east, the Don River Valley to the west, Danforth Avenue in the south, and Fulton Avenue in the north. The neighbourhood is built on land once owned by the Playter family for whom two streets in the area are named. The old farmhouse of the Playter household at 28 Playter Crescent is now the Playter Mansion, which is often used for various films, television shows, and commercials.

== History ==
The neighbourhood is historically Greek, but is increasingly popular among artists and business professionals.

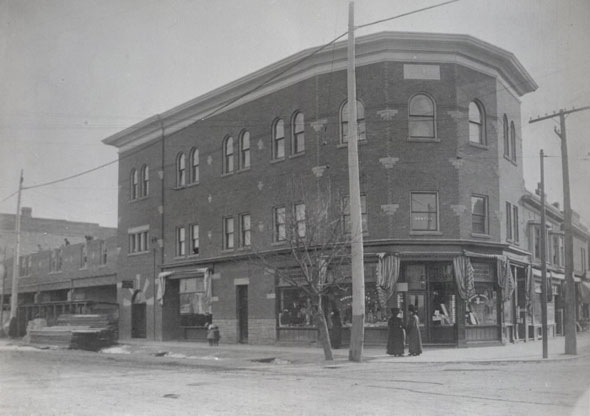
Playter Hall on the southeast corner of Broadview and Danforth Avenue, c. 1912. The area was historically occupied by Greeks.

Although the increasing home prices in the community cater to the upper-middle class, the neighbourhood still tends to lean to the left of the political spectrum, mainly supporting New Democratic Party candidates in provincial and federal elections. The area is also home to comedian and CBC series host Rick Mercer.

In a 2015 article in Toronto Life, Playter Estates was named Toronto's third-best neighbourhood to live in (based on several criteria, weighted by the magazine writers themselves).

=== Playter family ===
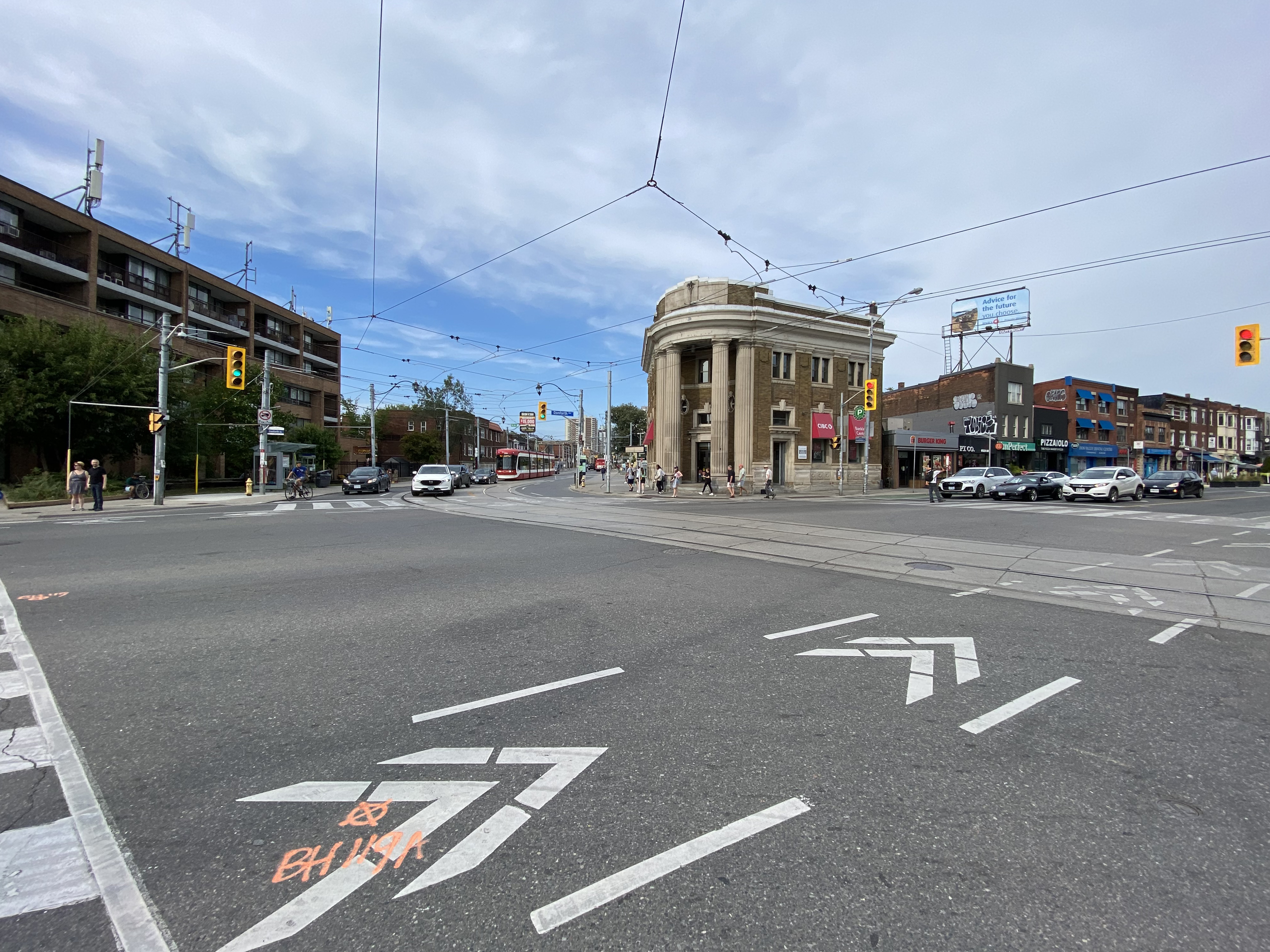
Broadview Avenue at Danforth Avenue in 2022

George Henry Playter was born around 1736 in Surrey and died around 1820–1822 in what is now Toronto. He emigrated from England to Pennsylvania, where he married Elizabeth Welding. During the American Revolution, he served, as a lieutenant first, and later as a captain, with the Loyalist "Guides and Pioneers" regiment, whose members served as scouts and guides for the army. The regiment was the administrative home for Loyalist members of the British Secret Service, whose primary function at the time was reconnaissance, rather than "spying" in the modern sense. His personal notes indicate he was constantly employed in that line to the end of the War. He was attained by the colonial government in 1788, and after the revolution he moved with his family first to Nova Scotia, then Kingston then finally to Toronto in 1793, where Lieutenant Governor Simcoe, to whom he may have been related by marriage, granted him 2000 acres (8 km^{2}) of land in York Township. He built a house on what is now Drumsnab Road near about Castle Frank.

The story, related in some histories, that George Henry Playter stole documents from Washington's headquarters, during the retreat from the Battle of Long Island, is entirely fictional, as is the claim that he was the grandson of Sir Lyonel Playters, 6th Baronet of Sotterley. His admittance, approved by General Howe, into the Loyalist "Guides and Pioneers" regiment" was in response to his rebuilding the draw of the bridge across the Delaware, for the British, after it had been destroyed by Washington's troops during the retreat from New York, an act for which he was attained by the Continental Congress; nothing to do with stealing documents. And his supposed father, Lyonel Playter son of Lyonel 6th Baronot of Sotterley, died 15 years before George was born.

He served as Colonel of the York militia; according to his son Ely's diary, George was captured at Drumsnab in 1813 by American troops looking for munitions, provincial archives and militia officers, but was quickly released. He died in 1822, and was buried on his estate. In 1896 his, and his family's, remains were exhumed and reburied in an unmarked grave in St. James Cemetery. George had at least three daughters (Elizabeth, Sarah, Mary) and five sons (John, James, Ely, Watson and George), and is remembered today mainly as the progenitor of the family that gave its name to the Playter Estates neighbourhood.

Ely was an MPP. His son John married Sarah Ellerbeck, for whom Ellerbeck Street is named. John's grandson John Lea Playter built the farmhouse at 28 Playter Crescent, the lands surrounding which were subdivided by 1912 to form the Playter Estates. Jackman Avenue is named for John Lea Playter's wife Mary Jackman. George Playter Jr. ran the first stage coach line between Newmarket and York along Yonge Street.
