= Hamilton Walker (politician) =

Upper Canada politician, lawyer and judge

Hamilton Walker (1782 – September 8, 1830) was a lawyer, judge and political figure in Upper Canada.

He lived in Prescott in Upper Canada and married Abigail Jessup, the daughter of Edward Jessup. He served in the local militia, serving during the War of 1812 and became colonel in 1828. He was appointed judge in the Bathurst and Johnstown District courts in 1823. In 1824, he was elected to represent Grenville in the 9th Parliament of Upper Canada. He died at Prescott in 1830.
