= Uncomfortable Oxford =

- Type: Community interest company
- Genre: Tour guide organisation Social enterprise
- Founded: 2018
- Founder: Paula Larsson & Olivia Durand
- Headquarters: Oxford, UK
- Area served: England
- Key people: Waqas Mirza (Executive Director)
- Services: Walking tours
- Divisions: Uncomfortable Cambridge (2022) Uncomfortable York (2023)
- Website: https://www.uncomfortableoxford.com

Uncomfortable Oxford [C.I.C] is a social enterprise and tour guide organisation based Oxford, England. Most of their tours are run by post-graduate students belonging to University of Oxford.

Founded in 2018 by Oxford University DPhil history students, the goal of the tours was to highlight the history of imperialism, gender and class inequalities within the city. The organisation also creates podcasts, blog articles, runs workshops and outreach programs, and hosts public lectures.

In 2022 a second branch was founded in Cambridge called Uncomfortable Cambridge. Then in 2023 a branch in York was founded called Uncomfortable York.

== History ==
=== Founding and origin ===
Uncomfortable Oxford was founded in late 2018 by two history DPhil students belonging to the University of Oxford, Paula Larsson and Olivia Durand, with the goal of highlighting the city's links to imperialism, gender and class inequality. Both students met each other at a Public Engagement with Research Summer School in 2018, led by The Oxford Research Centre in the Humanities (TORCH). Here they drafted plans for walking tours of Oxford which would raise discussions on imperialism, inequality, and oppression, using tours highlighting the city's built environment. According to Oxford University's Faculty of History, guided walking tours of this nature were rare throughout the UK and had never before been given in Oxford, though similar tours existed in Bristol, London, and Liverpool.

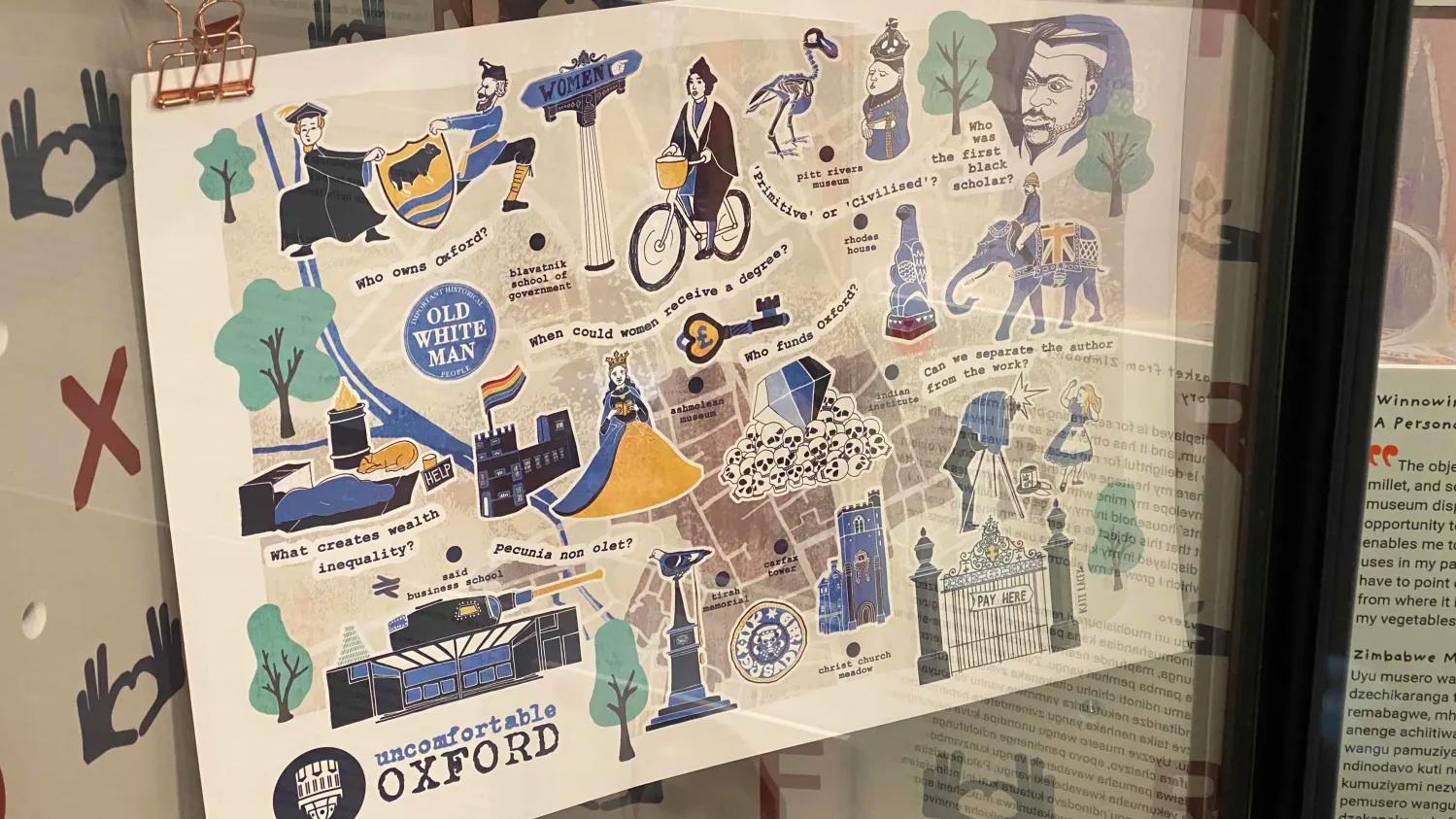
Uncomfortable Oxford materials displayed by the Museum of Oxford, Oxford Town Hall, 2025

=== First walking tour ===
The first Uncomfortable Oxford tours were given the city's Ideas Festival in 2018, wherein 300 people took in the guided walking tours featuring landmarks with connections to colonialism such as The Codrington Library, Rhodes House, Oriel College's statue of Cecil Rhodes, the Tirah Memorial in Bonn Square, the Weston Library, and the Oxford University Museum of Natural History. These tours involved over 300 people and raised £750 in tips, all of which was donated to a local charity called Homeless Oxfordshire.

=== Further activity ===
Uncomfortable Oxford tours were used as course material for the "Oxford-UNISA Decolonising Research Methodologies" teaching course, involving DPhil/PhD students from Oxford University and 10 African universities.

== Oxford city tours ==
Uncomfortable Oxford holds various tours in addition to seasonal and specialist events, though the themes and routes change regularly. Examples of the tours offered by Uncomfortable Oxford include;

- The Uncomfortable Oxford Tour - An introduction to Oxford's historical legacies of inequality, violence, and imperialism, including war memorials, statues, and discussions on the politics of memorialisation.
- The Oxford and Empire Tour - Highlights links between imperialism and Oxford University, including how the university helped facilitate the expansion of the British Empire.
- Follow the Money - Covers ethical debates concerning the funding sources of Oxford's academic institutions.
- Uncomfortable Literature - Focuses on Oxford's publishing and literature history as well as highlighting authors history has overlooked due to their gender, race or nationality.
- Uncomfortable Ashmolean Tour - A tour which takes place within Oxford University's Ashmolean Museum, which question the narratives of museum displays.
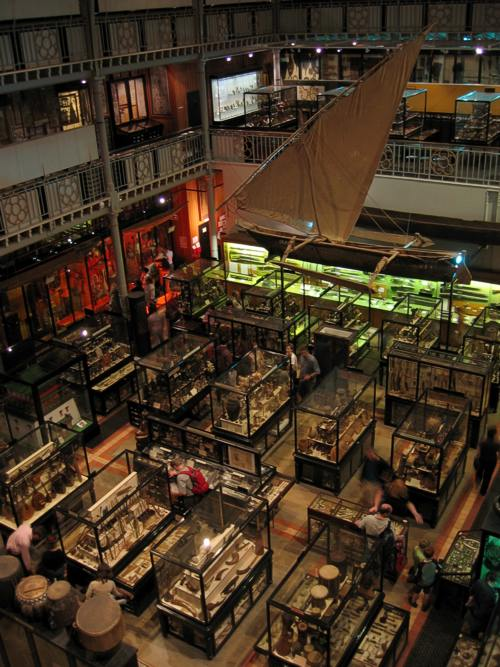
  Oxford's Pitt Rivers Museum is one of several academic institutions in Oxford working in tandem with Uncomfortable Oxford to teach the public about British imperial history

Due to the 2020 COVID-19 pandemic Uncomfortable Oxford began hosting online tours. This was done using video meetings and 360 camera angles of Oxford landmarks to illustrate their subjects.

== Other activities ==
Though guided walking tours of Oxford are the central focus of Uncomfortable Oxford's activities, the organisation has branched out into projects involving podcasts, hosting history lectures, and has a run a number of workshops and outreach programs.

Following protests in 2020 triggered by the murder of George Floyd, Uncomfortable Oxford published series of articles on statues and their legacies.

In 2020 researchers from the University of London used Uncomfortable Oxford tours as a model in a study on decolonisation in school curriculums.

== Collaborations with Oxford institutions ==
Uncomfortable Oxford has conducted numerous collaborations with a large number of Oxford institutions including; Pitt Rivers Museum, Project SOUP, Branch Up [Oxford Hub], Wadham College, the Oxford Climate Justice Campaign, Experience Oxfordshire, the Bodleian Library, the Department of Geography, and the Welcome Centre for Ethics and Humanities. The Ashmolean Museum sponsored Uncomfortable Oxford tours of their museum.

In late 2020 Uncomfortable Oxford started to conduct collaborations with the Museum of Modern Art, Oxford to highlight the work of female anthropologists who had worked within Oxford.

In 2025, Uncomfortable Oxford participated in the 50th anniversary celebrations of the Museum of Oxford with a temporary display in the museum.

== Reception ==
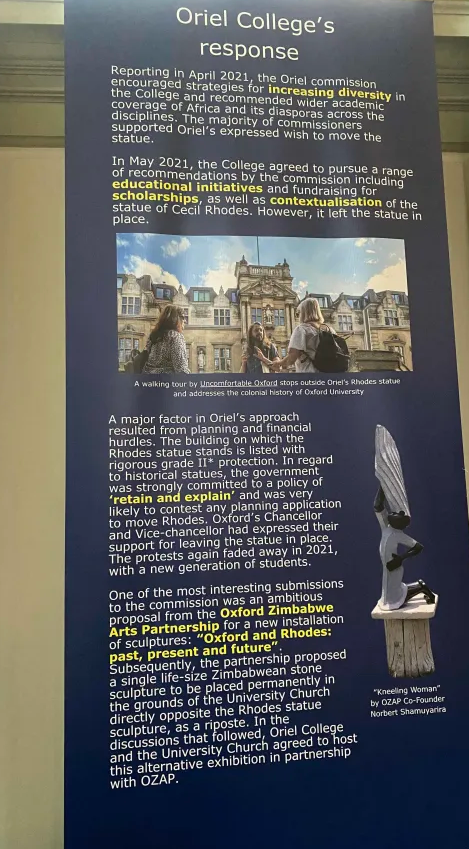
Uncomfortable Oxford features in a display on colonialism, University Church of St Mary the Virgin, Oxford University, 2025

In 2019 The Oxford Student gave a positive review, remarking the tours were a rewarding experience despite the solemn atmosphere, before giving a second positive review in 2022. In 2020 The Washington Post gave a review of Uncomfortable Oxford highlighting how open discussions were built into the design of Uncomfortable Oxford tours. In 2024 National Geographic listed Uncomfortable Oxford in their guide to exploring Oxford and the university.

According to the Times of Malta, over 20,000 people had participated in Uncomfortable Oxford walking tours between 2018-2023.

In 2020, researchers at Cumberland Lodge recommended to teachers that Uncomfortable Oxford's tours could be used as supplementary educational material.

Scholar of women's studies, Claire McCann, wrote that her time in Oxford had been enhanced by her participation in an Uncomfortable Oxford tour.

According to researchers from University College London, Uncomfortable Oxford partially sprang from the failure of the Rhodes Must Fall movement to remove Oriel College's statue of Cecil Rhodes.

In 2023 the Oxford University student newspaper Cherwell gave a glowing review of Uncomfortable Oxford tours, saying that the organisation "leads fantastic tours around the university, seeking to generate discussions about racial inequality, gender and class discrimination, and the university's Imperial legacy." That same year, following an invitation from Uncomfortable York, the student newspaper York Vision gave a positive review of one of their tours, describing the experience as "an immensely thought-provoking and educational experience."

=== Awards ===
In 2019 Uncomfortable Oxford received a High Commendation from the Oxford University Vice Chancellor's Social Impact Awards for "exceptional achievement and commitment to positive social change", for which it was awarded with funding from the AHRC-TORCH which was awarded by The Oxford Centre for the Research in the Humanities.

== Sister branches ==
=== Cambridge (2022) ===
In April 2022 a new branch of Uncomfortable Oxford was founded in the English city of Cambridge under the name Uncomfortable Cambridge, and was launched alongside Cambridge Festival. The first batch of tours were free entry, with guests being encouraged to instead donate to a homeless charity called Jimmy's Cambridge.

=== York (2023) ===
In May 2023 another branch was founded in York, England, with support from both the Rowntree Society and the University of York's Institute for the Public Understanding of the Past (IPUP).
