= John Matthews (Upper Canada politician) =

Captain in the Royal Artillery and Canadian politician

John Matthews (c. 1763 – 20 August 1832) was a Canadian military officer and politician who served as captain in the Royal Artillery and represented Middlesex County in the Parliament of Upper Canada from 1824 to 1830.

== Early life ==
John Matthews was probably born in England circa 1763. He claimed to have studied in Paris at an English college. At some point after 1779 he attended Royal Military Academy, Woolwich. He served with the Royal Artillery, achieving the rank of captain. He quit the artillery during the Napoleonic Wars to become a farmer, but returned after the post-Napoleonic depression caused an agricultural crisis. He retired when the Royal Artillery was disbanded.

== Arrival in Canada ==
Matthews immigrated to Canada in 1819. Matthews claimed that he came to Canada upon a promise by Charles Lennox, 4th Duke of Richmond, then the governor-in-chief of British North America, that Matthews would run a military settlement. Lennox died when Matthews landed in Quebec, and Matthews met with Peregrine Maitland, the lieutenant governor of Upper Canada, to relay this promise. Matthews settled in Queenston, Upper Canada, while he negotiated with Maitland for the site of the military colony. The Executive Council of Upper Canada eventually offered Matthews 800 acres in Lobo Township.

Matthews moved to Lobo Township in October 1820 with his family and household staff. He was disappointed with the land he bought and sold it at a loss to buy property in a more affluent part of the county. He accused the magistrate of gaining property through fraud and of public drunkenness. He also accused the commissioners for forfeited estates for providing the wrong deed, or not providing a deed at all, to the land he had purchased. Matthews's claims on his land purchased were supported by Maitland, but Henry John Boulton, the solicitor general, declared that the commissioners could not refund Matthews for his purchase. This caused Matthews to believe that the province of Upper Canada was ruled by an inner circle of closely connected families and friends.

== Provincial politics ==
Matthews, along with John Rolph, was elected to represent Middlesex County in the 9th Parliament of Upper Canada in 1824. He was supported by electors who also believed that government officials were disadvantaging the citizens for their own benefit.

On 31 December 1825, Matthews attended a performance by an American theatre company in York. The audience at the event called for performances of pro-American songs such as "Yankee Doodle" and "Hail, Columbia". Three months after the event Matthews was accused of leading the calls for the pro-American songs. Newspaper reports of the incident were submitted to the Board of Ordnance, who suspended his pension from the Royal Artillery in 1826. The Upper Canadian assembly created a committee to investigate the matter, which concluded that the accusations were unfounded. His pension was reinstated in 1828.

He initially declined to run for re-election to represent Middlesex County in the 10th Parliament, citing ill health. He later decided to run for re-election, winning the contest in 1828.

Matthews traveled to England in 1829 and stayed to attend to his wife; she died in April 1830. He remained in England until his death in 20 August 1832.

== Political philosophy and views ==
Matthews was elected to the Upper Canadian parliament as a reformer. His animosity towards the Upper Canadian government was a reaction to the disappointment he felt when his success in the colony did not meet his expectations and jealousy over the success of the ruling elite. He advocated for paternalistic social policies with the hope of creating a utopian society.

Matthews was originally a Roman Catholic, but converted to Anglicanism, then became a Unitarian. He was outspoken in his belief, and his colleagues in the Upper Canadian parliament referred to him as "the Reverend John Matthews" because of his constant preaching. He was adversarial towards the Anglican faith that was practiced by the ruling elite of Upper Canada.
