= Erika Dyck =

Canadian historian

- Born: 1975 (age 50–51); Saskatoon, Saskatchewan, Canada

Academic background
- Education: BA, Dalhousie University; MA, 2000, University of Saskatchewan; PhD, 2005, McMaster University
- Thesis: Psychedelic psychiatry: LSD and post-World War II medical experimentation in Canada (2005)

Erika Ellen Dyck (born 1975) is a Canadian historian. She is a professor of history and Canada Research Chair in the History of Medicine at the University of Saskatchewan. In 2014, Dyck was inducted to the New College of Scholars, Artists and Scientists at the Royal Society of Canada.

Born and raised in Saskatoon, Saskatchewan, Dyck began her undergraduate schooling at the University of Saskatchewan before transferring to Dalhousie University. She returned to her hometown for her Master's degree before enrolling at McMaster University for her PhD in History of Medicin. While earning her doctoral degree, she was convinced by Larry Stewart to research experimentation in Canada, leading her to study LSD and eugenics in Saskatchewan.

== Early life and education ==
Dyck was born in 1975, in Saskatoon, Saskatchewan, Canada. Following high school, she enrolled in the University of Saskatchewan (U of S) for her Bachelor of Arts degree before transferring to Dalhousie University to complete her undergraduate degree. From there, she returned to Saskatchewan and completed a Master's degree under Valerie Korinek in 2000 and began her PhD in History of Medicine at McMaster University. While earning her doctoral degree, she was convinced by Dr. Larry Stewart to research the history of therapeutic experimentation with drugs in Canada. Upon discovering an asylum in Weyburn, Saskatchewan which had become "ground zero for international LSD research," she chose to conduct her thesis on this topic. In 2005, she published the history of LSD, including its rise and decline from medical research, in an article in the Canadian Journal of Psychiatry.

== Career ==
Upon completing her PhD, Dyck accepted a faculty position at University of Alberta where she served as co-director of the History of Medicine Program from 2005 until 2008. She left the University of Alberta in 2008 and accepted an inaugural Tier 2 Canada Research Chair in History of Medicine position at the U of S. During her early tenure at the school, Dyck published her first book titled Psychedelic Psychiatry: LSD on the Canadian Prairies through the University of Manitoba Press.

Dyck's second book, Facing Eugenics: Reproduction, Sterilization, and the Politics of Choice, was published in 2012 through the Johns Hopkins University Press. Following the publication of the book, Dyck and colleague Regan Mandryk were inducted to the New College of Scholars, Artists and Scientists at the Royal Society of Canada. Her Canada Research Chair was also renewed for a five-year term to support her research and she was appointed to several editorial boards. In November 2015, Dyck was appointed co-editor of the McGill-Queen's/Associated Medical Services Studies in the History of Medicine, Health, and Society Series. She was also later named a co-editor for the Canadian Bulletin of Medical History with Kenton Kroker.

Dyck subsequently began working on her third book, Managing Madness: Weyburn Mental Hospital and the Transformation of Psychiatric Care in Canada, published through the Johns Hopkins University Press in 2018. Alongside co-author Alex Deighton, their book was the 2018 recipient of the Prairies Clio Prize from the Canadian Historical Association. She was also nominated for the 2017 YWCA Saskatoon Women of Distinction. During the COVID-19 pandemic in North America, Dyck collaborated with U of S professors to create a community archive project with the Western Development Museum. Locals were encouraged to virtually upload things that were important to them or helped them hope during the pandemic and would be preserved in a virtual archive.

== Selected publications ==
- The Acid Room: The Psychedelic Trials and Tribulations of Hollywood Hospital, with Jesse Donaldson (2022)
- Challenging Choices: Canada's Population Control in The 1970s, with Maureen Lux (2020)
- Managing Madness: Weyburn Mental Hospital and the Transformation of Psychiatric Care in Canada, with Alex Deighton (2017)
- Facing Eugenics: Reproduction, Sterilization, and the Politics of Choice (2013)
- Psychedelic Psychiatry: LSD on the Canadian Prairies (2008)
