= William Salmon (politician) =

Lawyer, judge and political figure in Upper Canada

William Salmon (June 2, 1802 – February 8, 1868) was an English-born lawyer, judge and political figure in Upper Canada. He represented Norfolk in the Legislative Assembly of Upper Canada from 1838 to 1841 as a Conservative.

He was born in Alveston, the son of Colonel George Salmon, and came to Upper Canada with his parents in 1809. Salmon studied law with John Rolph and practised for a time in London before settling in Simcoe. He was married twice: first to Emma, a sister of John Rolph, and then to a daughter of a James Fraser. He served as a major in the Norfolk militia. Salmon was elected to the assembly in an 1838 by-election held after John Rolph was expelled from the assembly for conspiring with the rebels during the Upper Canada Rebellion. He was named a judge in the Norfolk County Court in 1845. Salmon died in Simcoe.
