= William Thompson (Upper Canada) =

Canadian politician

William Thompson (June 17, 1786 – January 18, 1860) was a farmer and political figure in Upper Canada.

== Biography ==
He was born in New Brunswick in 1786, the son of a United Empire Loyalist, and came to Grantham Township with his family in 1809. He served as captain in the 2nd York Militia during the War of 1812 and fought at the Battle of Queenston Heights. He was taking prisoner by the Americans while on a scouting expedition. When he returned, his father had died and their property damaged; he settled in Toronto Township. He built a sawmill with his brother in 1817. During the Upper Canada Rebellion, he served as colonel in the York Militia and became lieutenant colonel in 1846. In 1824, he was elected to the 9th Parliament of Upper Canada for York and Simcoe. He was a conservative member, with close ties to members of the so-called "Family Compact". After several attempts at reelection, he retired to local politics. In 1844, he became a member of the township council and was reeve in 1851.

He died in Toronto Township in 1860.

His grandson, Alfred Burke Thompson, later served in the provincial and federal parliaments.
