= Ely Playter =

Farmer, lumberman, militia officer, and member of the Upper Canada House of Assembly

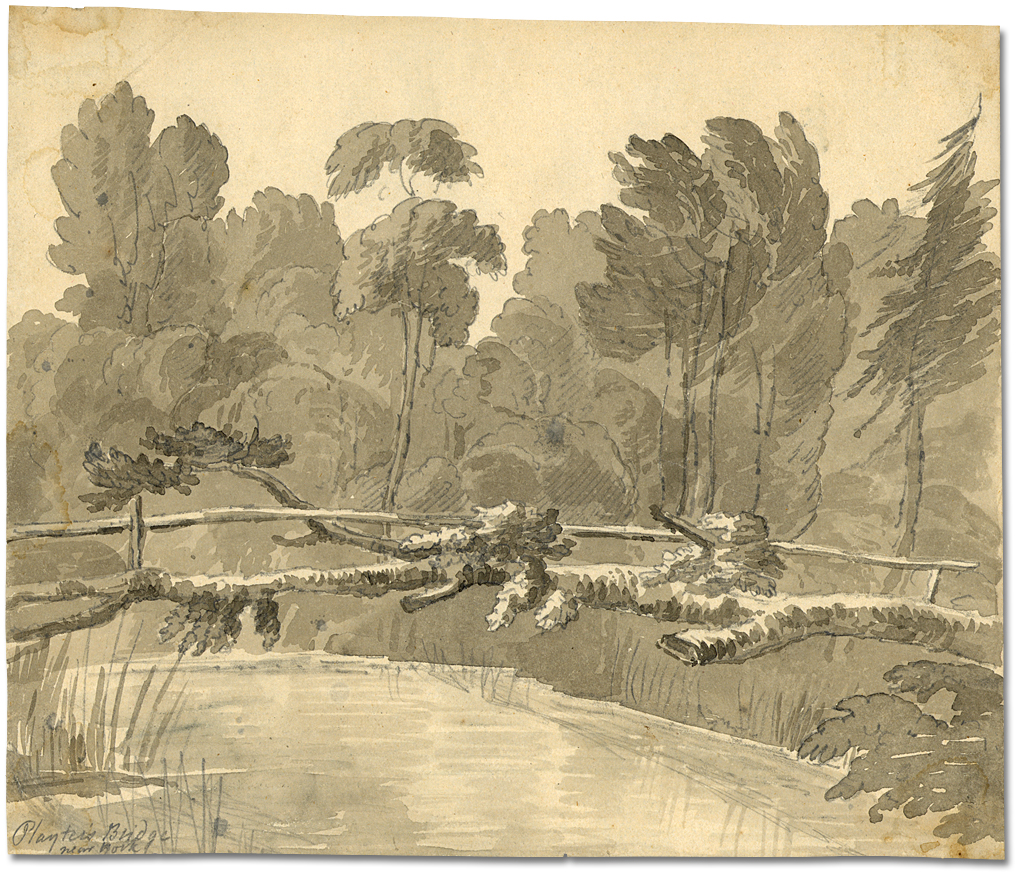
Playter's bridge over the Don River leading to Ely Playter's parent's home.

Ely Playter (1776–1858) was a farmer, lumberman, militia officer, and member of the Upper Canada House of Assembly, who lived in and around York, modern day Toronto.

Playter was born on November 30, 1776, in Chesterfield Township, Burlington County, New Jersey to George Henry Playter, a Loyalist, and his wife Elizabeth Welding, a Quaker. By the 1790s, Playter, with his parents and siblings, had moved to York in Upper Canada.

In York, Playter worked as a tavern-keeper, farmer, and militia officer. He participated in the War of 1812 including the siege of York. Following the war he was elected to the 9th Parliament of Upper Canada, defeating William Warren Baldwin in 1824. Playter moved with his family sometime around 1826 to Pekin, Niagara County, New York.

Playter documented his life from 1801 to 1853 in a number of diaries. In addition to documenting his day-to-day life, he also provided a first-hand account of someone living through the War of 1812. Topics include the challenge of rounding up the local militia, the siege and subsequent fall of York to American soldiers in 1813 and its subsequent occupation. Playter's diaries have been used as primary resource material for numerous publications related to the early history of Toronto including Pierre Berton's War of 1812 and Flames Across the Border, 1813–1814. Part of his diaries were published in Edith G. Firth's The Town of York 1793–1815: A Collection of Documents of Early Toronto

Playter married Sophie Beman on November 27, 1806. They had numerous children. Their son, Ely Welding Playter was the 24th Mayor of Oakland.

Playter died on August 29, 1858, in Pekin, New York.
