= Paula Larsson =

Canadian historian

- Occupation: Historian
- Awards: Mary Lemessurier Award, James Burns Scholarship

Academic background
- Education: University of Oxford
- Doctoral advisor: Professor Mark Harrison

Academic work
- Discipline: History
- Sub-discipline: Medicine, colonialism, Canadian history
- Institutions: Uncomfortable Oxford
- Website: https://www.history.ox.ac.uk/people/paula-larsson

Paula Larsson is a Canadian historian of medical and colonial history at the University of Oxford. She is most notable for her research into the history of eugenics, social darwinism, the First Nations of Canada, and most prominently the history of anti-vaccine conspiracies in Canada. She is a winner of both The James Burn Scholarship and the Mary Lemessurier Award.

== Early life ==
Paula Larsson grew up in a large family based in Calgary, Canada. She was once a volunteer with a charity organisation known as Feed the Hungry.

== Public engagement ==
Larsson's activities largely involve public engagement with local history in Oxford. She was one of the developers of the Oxford and Empire Network, and the co-founder of Uncomfortable Oxford. She is also a writer for The Conversation, where she contributes to the history of vaccine hesitancy in the English speaking world, and topics such as racism within anti-vaccinations movements, the polio vaccine heist of 1959, and the recycling of anti-vaccine talking points from the nineteenth century to the present day. She is also a contributor to the Canadian Eugenics Archive.

== Other activities ==
Larsson was one the president of the University of Oxford's Canadian students society.

== Awards ==
- Mary Lemessurier Award (2017).
- The James Burn Scholarship (2018).

== Publications ==
- Larsson, Paula, Diana Mansell, Frank W. Stahnisch, eds. Bedside to Community: Fifty years of Contributions to the Health of Albertans by the University of Calgary. Calgary: University of Calgary Press, 2019.
- Larsson, Paula, “A History of Aboriginal Health Research within the Faculty (Cumming School) of Medicine, University of Calgary, 1966 – 2016,” in Bedside to Community: Fifty years of Contributions to the Health of Albertans by the University of Calgary, Paula Larsson, Diana Mansell, Frank W. Stahnisch (editors). Calgary: University of Calgary Press, 2019.
- Larsson, Paula. "Lessons in Race: Curriculum in Indian Residential Schools, 1930-1950." History of Intellectual Culture 11, 1 (2014–16).
- Larsson, Paula. “Escaping the Asylum: Patient Resistance at the Toronto Asylum for the Insane, 1900-1940,” Proceedings of the 2013 History of Medicine Days Conference. Cambridge Scholars Publishing, 2018.
