= Edward William McBride =

Canadian politician

Edward William McBride (ca 1791 – September 3, 1834) was a businessman and political figure in Upper Canada.

He was born in Newark (Niagara-on-the-Lake) around 1791, the son of a United Empire Loyalist. He served in the local militia during the War of 1812. He was assistant to King's Printer John Cameron and took over this function from the time when Cameron became ill in April 1815 until February 1816, several months after Cameron's death. After that, he ran an inn at Niagara. In 1824, he was elected to the Legislative Assembly of Upper Canada for the town of Niagara as a Reformer. He supported government funding for the Welland Canal and defended those who supported Robert Gourlay. For a time, with Bartemas Ferguson, he published the Niagara Herald, a newspaper owned by John Crooks. As a freemason, he was accused of being associated with the kidnapping and presumed murder of Captain William Morgan, who is said to have revealed secrets of the order. Although McBride denied these accusations, this contributed to his defeat in the 1828 election.

He died in Niagara in 1834.
