= David Duncombe =

Upper Canada politician

David Duncombe (1802–1887) was a medical doctor and political figure in Upper Canada.

He was born in New York state in 1802 and came to Upper Canada with his brother Charles. He studied medicine at Fairfield College in New York state and later served as coroner in the Talbot District. He was elected to the Legislative Assembly of Upper Canada to represent Norfolk in 1834 and served until 1841. He was a Reformer but did not participate in the Upper Canada Rebellion.

He died at Waterford in 1887.
