= Canadian Journal of Women and the Law =

- Discipline: Women, legal studies
- Language: English, French
- Edited by: Angela Cameron, Vanessa Gruben, Audrey Ferron Parayre

Publication details
- History: 1985-present
- Publisher: University of Toronto Press (Canada)
- Frequency: Biannual

Standard abbreviations
- ISO 4: Can. J. Women Law

Indexing
- ISSN: 0832-8781 (print); 1911-0235 (web)
- LCCN: ce87039029
- OCLC no.: 917659097

Links
- Journal homepage; Online access; Online archive

The Canadian Journal of Women and the Law (Revue Femmes et Droit) is a biannual peer-reviewed academic journal covering the impact of law on women's social, economic, and legal status. It was established in 1985 and is published by the University of Toronto Press. The Journal is currently based at the Faculty of Law, University of Ottawa.

== Abstracting and indexing ==
The journal is abstracted and indexed in:

- EBSCO databases
- Emerging Sources Citation Index
- HeinOnline
- International Bibliography of the Social Sciences
- ProQuest databases
- Scopus
