= Regan Mandryk =

Canadian computer scientist

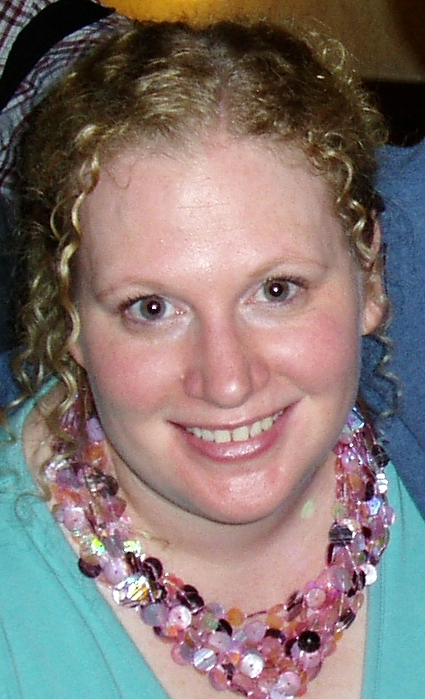
- Mandryk in 2006
- Born: December 9, 1975 (age 50); Winnipeg, Manitoba, Canada
- Citizenship: Canadian
- Known for: Human-computer interaction; games research; physiological evaluation; affective computing

Academic background
- Education: BSc, Mathematics and Physics, 1997, University of Winnipeg; MSc, Kinesiology, 2000, PhD, Computing Science, 2005, Simon Fraser University
- Thesis: Modeling user emotion in interactive play environments: A fuzzy physiological approach (2005)

Academic work
- Institutions: University of Saskatchewan

Regan Lee Mandryk is a Canadian computer scientist and Professor of Computer Science at the University of Victoria where she holds a Canada Research Chair in Digital Games and Immersive Social Technologies. She specializes in Human-computer interaction (HCI), with a focus on digital games, physiological evaluation of user experience, and the design of games for social and emotional well-being. In 2023, she was inducted into the SIGCHI Academy, one of the most prestigious recognitions in the HCI field.

== Early life and education ==
Mandryk was born on December 9, 1975, in Winnipeg, Manitoba. Mandryk earned her Bachelor of Science degree from the University of Winnipeg in 1997. She completed her Master's degree and PhD at Simon Fraser University in British Columbia. Mandryk's PhD dissertation applied physiological measures to model user emotion in interactive play environments. She was awarded the 2005 Dean of Graduate Studies Convocation Medal in Applied Sciences and was nominated for the Canadian Association of Graduate Studies Distinguished Dissertation Award. She then completed post-doctoral fellowships at the University of British Columbia and Dalhousie University before joining the University of Saskatchewan faculty in 2007.

== Career ==
Mandryk joined the University of Saskatchewan’s Department of Computer Science in 2007, where she worked alongside Carl Gutwin in the Human-Computer Interaction Lab. She progressed through the academic ranks, conducting research on video games, physiological evaluation, and game-user research. In 2008, she received an NSERC University Faculty Award, supporting her early-career research program. She had originally never looked at the university for she had no family connections to Saskatoon but was convinced by Gutwin's work. As an assistant professor, she co-received a Natural Sciences and Engineering Research Council grant to study how to increase university-aged students physical activity. Alongside Kevin Stanley, they developed a game called Gemini which would incorporate a player's real-world activities such as walking, running or riding a bicycle into a role-playing computer game.

In January 2015, Mandryk was selected as an inaugural member of the Royal Society of Canada’s College of New Scholars, Artists and Scientists. She later received the University of Saskatchewan's New Researcher Award. The following year, Mandryk and researchers at the Interaction Lab began developing concentration exercises to assist children with fetal alcohol spectrum disorder. Their game involved the player's avatar runs endlessly forward, collecting coins and avoiding obstacles, while the player wore a headset to monitor their brain activity. Through the use of positive reinforcement, Mandryk's research team were attempting to train those with fetal alcohol spectrum disorder to focus. In 2016, she received the Outstanding Young Canadian Computer Science Researcher Prize from the Canadian Association of Computer Science. She received a $1.65 million grant to create a graduate program in game-user research for the Saskatchewan Waterloo Games User Research Initiative, and later received the E.W.R. Steacie Memorial Fellowship from NSERC in 2018, providing $250,000 over two years to fund her research on using video games to assess mental health.

Mandryk later began researching whether video games could be used to assess mental health. This project earned her a E.W.R. Steacie Memorial Fellowship, $250,000 over two years, by the Natural Sciences and Engineering Research Council of Canada to fund her research. During the COVID-19 pandemic in North America, Mandryk promoted the use of video games while isolating as a way to deal with stress, anxiety and other mental health challenges. She said that due to social isolation, children were missing out on interactions with their friends and video games were a way to socialize.

In 2020, Mandryk was awarded a Tier 1 Canada Research Chair in Digital Gaming Technologies and Experiences at the University of Saskatchewan, providing $200,000 annually for seven years. She subsequently moved to the University of Victoria, where she holds a Canada Research Chair in Digital Games and Immersive Social Technologies in the Department of Computer Science. During the COVID-19 pandemic, Mandryk promoted the use of video games as a way to deal with stress, anxiety, and social isolation, noting that games provided a way for children to socialize when in-person interactions were limited. In 2026, Mandryk was appointed Acting Associate Dean, Research, for the Faculty of Engineering and Computer Science at the University of Victoria (term: 1 July 2026 – 31 December 2026).

== Research ==
Mandryk’s research explores the potential of digital games to provide social and emotional benefits to players, as well as developing models of user experience, emotion, and social interaction in gaming contexts. She pioneered the area of affective physiological evaluation for computer games in her Ph.D. research, developing methods to continuously model emotion during interaction with play environments using fuzzy physiological approaches. Her work has included developing concentration exercises to assist children with fetal alcohol spectrum disorder using brain-computer interface games, and creating games that incorporate real-world physical activity into role-playing game mechanics. One of her papers was named among Google Scholar’s ten classic papers in HCI from 2006, a distinction recognizing foundational contributions to the field.

Mandryk has published more than 200 peer-reviewed publications and has received 29 best paper awards or honourable mentions at top-tier conferences. Her work has been cited more than 20,000 times on Google Scholar, with an h-index of 67. She led games research within the Canadian GRAND (Graphics, Animation and New Media) Network, a nationwide research initiative funded by the federal government to advance digital media research in Canada.

== Service and leadership ==
Mandryk co-founded the ACM SIGCHI conference series CHI PLAY, which focuses on the intersection of play and HCI. The conference, launched in 2014, has become the premier venue for games and HCI research. She served as General Chair of CHI 2018, the flagship ACM conference in human-computer interaction, which is among the largest and most prestigious academic conferences in the field. She subsequently served as Chair of the CHI Steering Committee from 2019 to 2022, providing strategic direction for the conference series during a period of significant growth and transition. Beyond co-founding CHI PLAY, Mandryk has continued to lead the conference series for over a decade, serving as papers chair in 2014, 2015, 2023, and 2024, and as technical program chair in 2016. She chaired the inaugural Games and Play subcommittee for the CHI conference in 2016 — also notable as the first virtual program subcommittee at CHI — and led CHI PLAY’s transition into the PACM HCI journal format in 2021, serving as the games track’s supervisory chair since that transition. Through these roles, Mandryk played a key role in establishing and building the gaming research community within SIGCHI, helping to elevate games research as a recognized subfield of HCI.

Mandryk has also led major efforts to reform the CHI conference’s own format and peer review process. She led the CHI Steering Committee’s working group on conference format and finances, which she documented in a multi-part blog series on chi.acm.org; the group’s proposals were piloted beginning at CHI 2026 in Barcelona, introducing a streamlined weekday-only, five-day format with papers presented in the mornings and interactive content in the afternoons. She subsequently co-chaired the CHI Steering Committee’s working group on peer review, which developed proposals for open review, reviewer qualifications, and the use of artificial intelligence in review that were also documented in blog posts on chi.acm.org. Mandryk is one of six Papers Chairs for CHI 2027, which is implementing an AI-assisted staged review process to manage a projected submission volume of approximately 10,000 papers, up from 6,730 at CHI 2026. Mandryk’s research has been covered by media outlets including CBC News and the StarPhoenix.

== Awards and honors ==
- 2005: Dean of Graduate Studies Convocation Medal in Applied Sciences, Simon Fraser University
- 2008: NSERC University Faculty Award
- 2015: Inaugural member, Royal Society of Canada’s College of New Scholars, Artists and Scientists
- 2015: University of Saskatchewan New Researcher Award
- 2016: Outstanding Young Canadian Computer Science Researcher Prize, Canadian Association of Computer Science
- 2018: E.W.R. Steacie Memorial Fellowship, NSERC
- 2020: Tier 1 Canada Research Chair in Digital Gaming Technologies and Experiences, University of Saskatchewan
- 2023: Inducted into the SIGCHI Academy
- 2023: Canadian Human-Computer Communications Society (CHCCS) Achievement Award
