= Canadian Bulletin of Medical History =

- Discipline: History of Medicine Health
- Language: English
- Edited by: Erika Dyck and Kenton Kroker

Publication details
- History: 1984-present
- Publisher: University of Toronto Press (Canada)
- Frequency: Biannual

Standard abbreviations
- ISO 4: Can. Bull. Med. Hist.

Indexing
- ISSN: 0823-2105 (print); 2371-0179 (web)

Links
- Journal homepage

The Canadian Bulletin of Medical History is a peer-reviewed academic journal for the history of medicine, health, and related fields. Its aim is to situate the history of health, medicine, and biomedical science within local, regional, and international contexts. It publishes articles in French and English, and is published twice a year by the University of Toronto Press.

== Abstracting and indexing ==
The journal is abstracted and indexed in:

- America: History and Life
- America: History and Life with Full Text
- Biomedical Reference Collection: Corporate Edition
- Canadian Periodical Index
- History of Science, Technology & Medicine
- PubMed
- Scopus

== See also ==
- History of public health in Canada
