= Peter Shaver =

Canadian politician

Peter Shaver, MLA
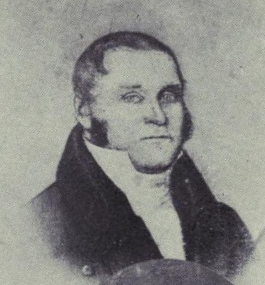

Member of the Legislative Assembly of the Province of Canada for Dundas
- In office 1821–1824
- Preceded by: John Crysler
- Succeeded by: John Crysler

Member of the Legislative Assembly of Upper Canada for Dundas
- In office 1829–1840

Personal details
- Born: September 27, 1776 Montgomery County, New York
- Died: June 21, 1866 (aged 89) Iroquois, Ontario
- Occupation: Farmer, politician, soldier, timber merchant

Military service
- Allegiance: Upper Canada
- Branch/service: Canadian militia
- Years of service: 1812 - 1856
- Rank: Private; Captain; Lieutenant-Colonel
- Unit: 1st Dundas Regiment of Militia; Dundas Cavalry Troop
- Commands: 3rd (Winchester & Mountain) Battalion, Dundas Militia (1846-56)
- Battles/wars: War of 1812: Battle of Ogdensburg; Battle of Crysler's Farm; Upper Canada Rebellion

Peter Shaver (September 27, 1776 – June 21, 1866) was a farmer, businessman and political figure in Upper Canada.

He was born in Montgomery County, New York in 1776, the son of a German immigrant (the family name was originally spelled Schaeffer). His father was a loyalist who served with the British forces during the American Revolution and settled in Matilda Township in Dundas County, Upper Canada after the war.

Peter served as a Private with the Dundas County Militia during the War of 1812 and then raised and commanded the Dundas Cavalry Troop from 1822-1840, including during the Upper Canada Rebellion. He later reached the rank of lieutenant-colonel and commanded the 3rd Battalion, Dundas Militia from 1846-1850s.

He was elected to the Legislative Assembly of Upper Canada in 1820 for Dundas and was reelected in 1828 and served until 1841. He was appointed justice of the peace in the Eastern District in 1825. Shaver farmed and was also involved in the timber trade.

He died in Iroquois in 1866.
