= John Cook (Upper Canada politician) =

Merchant and politician in Upper Canada and Canada West

John Cook, MLA
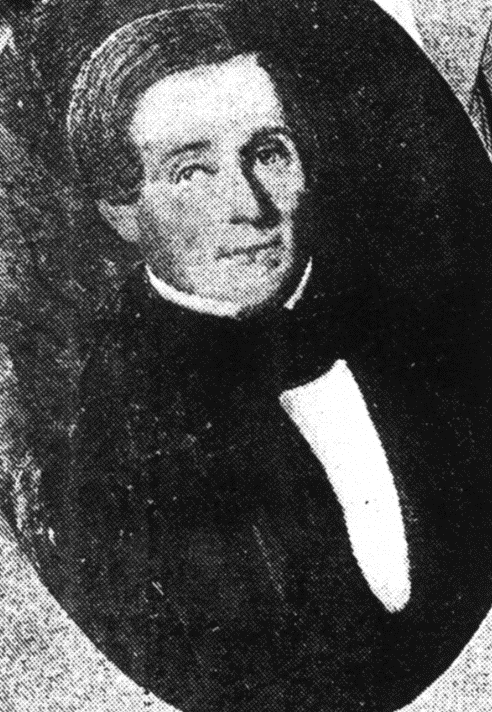

Member of the Legislative Assembly of the Province of Canada for Dundas
- In office 1841–1844
- Preceded by: New position
- Succeeded by: George Greenfield Macdonell

Member of the Legislative Assembly of Upper Canada for Dundas
- In office 1830–1840

Personal details
- Born: November 28, 1791 Williamsburg Township, Dundas County
- Died: November 8, 1888 (aged 96) Ottawa, Ontario
- Occupation: Merchant

Military service
- Allegiance: Upper Canada
- Branch/service: Canadian militia
- Years of service: 1812 - 1814
- Rank: Private
- Unit: Dundas County Militia
- Battles/wars: War of 1812: Battle of Crysler's Farm

John Cook (November 28, 1791 – November 8, 1877) was a merchant and political figure in Upper Canada and Canada West.

He was born on what was later known as Crysler's Farm in Williamsburgh Township in Upper Canada in 1791; he later sold that property to John Crysler. He served with the Dundas County Militia during the War of 1812 and fought at the Battle of Crysler's Farm.

Cook exchanged his land at Crysler's Farm, which fronted on the Saint Lawrence, with a tract of land in Williamsburg Township, owned by John Crysler. He operated a timber business and ran a general store in North Williamsburg. A vigorous man, he was known to walk to Montreal when he had business there, rather than travel by boat on the Saint Lawrence. He was generous to the poor and needy, and contributed a large sum towards the building of the first Lutheran church in the area.

He represented Dundas in the Legislative Assembly of Upper Canada from 1830 to 1840. Cook was appointed justice of the peace in the Eastern District in 1835. He was sympathetic to William Lyon Mackenzie and the Reform movement. During the 1837 Rebellion, his home was searched late one night because Mackenzie was rumoured to have paid Cook a visit. The militia officer commanding the troops was John Crysler, who told Cook that he could be hanged if they found he was sheltering Mackenzie.

Following the union of Upper Canada and Lower Canada into the Province of Canada in 1840, Cook was elected to represent Dundas in the first Parliament which met from 1841 to 1844. In the first session, he was one of the ultra-Reformers, who supported the union, but consistently voted against the Governor-General, Lord Sydenham. In later sessions, he was a dependable vote for Reform. Cook stood for re-election in the 1844 general election, but was defeated by George Macdonell, who supported the Governor-General's government.

The sons of his brother George, James William, Hermon Henry and Simon, became merchants and political figures in Ontario.

Three of his grandsons, John William Cook (1834-1864), Ira Jacob Cook (1838-1910), and Rufus George Cook (1843-1924), were born in Dundas county and moved to Iowa, fighting with the 31st Iowa Infantry Regiment in the American Civil War. John W. Cook died of wounds from the Battle of Atlanta.
