= Thomas Fraser (Upper Canada politician) =

Canadian politician

MLA for Dundas
- In office 1800–1804
- Preceded by: Alexander Campbell
- Succeeded by: Jacob Weager

MLA for Glengarry County
- In office 1808–1812
- Preceded by: Walter Butler Wilkinson (for Glengarry & Prescott)
- Succeeded by: John Macdonell

Personal details
- Born: 1749 Stratherrick, Inverness, Scotland
- Died: October 18, 1821 (aged 71–72) Matilda Township, Dundas County, Upper Canada
- Relatives: Richard Duncan Fraser (son); Richard Duncan (brother-in-law)
- Occupation: Mill owner, local official

Military service
- Allegiance: Great Britain; Upper Canada
- Branch/service: British Army; Canadian militia
- Years of service: 1777 - 1783; 1812 - 1814
- Rank: Lieutenant; Colonel
- Unit: Loyal Rangers; Dundas County Militia
- Battles/wars: American Revolution: Northern New York Campaign; War of 1812: Battle of Ogdensburg

Thomas Fraser (1749 – October 18, 1821) was a soldier and political figure in Upper Canada.

He was born in Stratherrick, Inverness, Scotland in 1749. His family came to North America in 1767 and settled on the estate of Sir William Johnson in Tryon County, New York. In 1777, he and his brother were captured while trying to escape to Quebec. They escaped and joined Major-General John Burgoyne at Fort Edward. After the fall of Saratoga, they escaped north to Quebec. In 1779, they served as border guards at the Yamaska River and later became Lieutenants in Edward Jessup's Loyal Rangers.

In 1784, he settled in Edwardsburg Township, where he built a sawmill. In 1786, he became a justice of the peace and, in 1792, was appointed to the land board for Leeds and Grenville counties. He was also the first sheriff in the Johnstown District. He represented Dundas in the 2nd Parliament of Upper Canada and Glengarry in the 5th Parliament.

During the War of 1812, he commanded the Dundas County Militia, and was in command of all Canadian Militia at the Battle of Ogdensburg. After the war, he moved to Matilda Township in Dundas County. He was appointed to the Legislative Council for the province in 1815. He died in Matilda Township in 1821.

== External references ==
- Biography at the Dictionary of Canadian Biography Online
- Glengarry's Representatives in the Legislative Assembly of Upper Canada
