= George Brouse =

Canadian politician

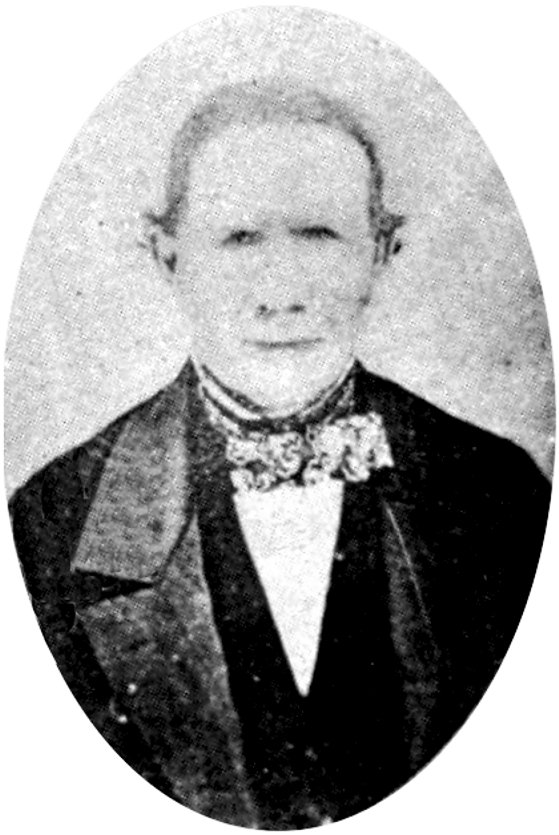

Member of the Legislative Assembly of the Province of Canada for Dundas
- In office 1829–1830
- Preceded by: New position
- Succeeded by: George Greenfield Macdonell

Personal details
- Born: 1790 Matilda Township, Dundas County
- Died: February 12, 1860 (aged 69–70) Iroquois, Ontario
- Occupation: Merchant, postmaster, farmer, politician, soldier

Military service
- Allegiance: Upper Canada
- Branch/service: Canadian militia
- Years of service: 1812 - 1840s
- Rank: Private; Captain
- Unit: 1st Dundas Regiment of Militia; 2nd (Matilda) Battalion, Dundas Militia
- Battles/wars: War of 1812; Upper Canada Rebellion

George Brouse (1790 – February 12, 1860) was a farmer, businessperson, and political figure in Upper Canada.

He was born in Matilda Township, Dundas County, Upper Canada, in 1790, the son of Peter Brouse, a United Empire Loyalist from Stone Arabia, Montgomery County, New York. He opened a general store on his property some time after 1814. A small community originally known as Matilda and later Iroquois, Ontario, developed in the area.

In 1810 Peter Brouse had converted George and his brother Peter to Methodism but he did not continue in this faith until the great revival in 1822, when he was restored, and became a lifelong steward of the church.

During the 1820s, he built a gristmill, sawmill, shingle factory, and woollen mill. From 1828 to 1876, he was postmaster in the area. In 1829 he was elected to the 10th Parliament of Upper Canada, Legislative Assembly of Upper Canada for Dundas. In 1846, he became a captain in the 2nd Regiment of the Dundas County Militia. In 1857, Iroquois was incorporated as a village and Brouse became its first reeve. He died in Iroquois in 1860.

He was the uncle of William Henry Brouse, a Canadian MP.
