= John Pliny Crysler =

Canadian politician (1801 – 1881)

John Pliny Crysler, MLA
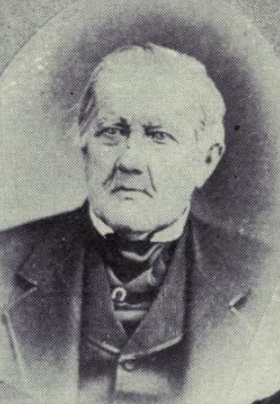

Member of the Legislative Assembly of the Province of Canada for Dundas
- In office 1848–1851
- Preceded by: George Greenfield Macdonell
- Succeeded by: Jesse W. Rose

Member of the Legislative Assembly of Upper Canada for Dundas
- In office 1854–1857
- Preceded by: Jesse W. Rose
- Succeeded by: James William Cook

Personal details
- Born: February 26, 1801 Crysler's Farm, Williamsburg Township, Dundas County
- Died: April 7, 1881 (aged 80) Morrisburg, Ontario
- Party: Conservative
- Relatives: John Crysler (father)
- Occupation: Timber merchant, soldier, politician, registrar

Military service
- Allegiance: Upper Canada
- Branch/service: Canadian militia
- Years of service: 1837 - 1880
- Rank: Lieutenant; Captain; Colonel
- Unit: 1st Regiment of Dundas Militia (1837-53); Dundas Reserve Militia (1869-80)
- Commands: 4th (Winchester) Battalion, Dundas Militia (1859-1864)
- Battles/wars: Upper Canada Rebellion: Battle of the Windmill; Trent Affair Fenian Raids

John Pliny Crysler (February 26, 1801 – April 7, 1881) was a timber merchant and political figure in Canada West.

== Early life ==
He was born on Crysler's Farm in 1801, the son of Lt. Col. John Crysler by his first wife Dorothea. He was raised in Williamsburg Township, Dundas County.

== Military service ==
He was a captain in the 1st Battalion, Dundas Militia and led his company into action at the Battle of the Windmill of Nov 12–16 1838. He served in the 1st Battalion until the 1850s, when he was appointed an officer in the 4th Dundas Battalion.

He was promoted to Lt-Colonel and placed in command of the 4th Battalion (Winchester Township), Dundas Militia in 1859, commanding it during the Trent Affair and threats from Americans and Fenians. He commanded until 1864. In 1869, he was appointed Major in the Dundas Reserve Militia, and served until shortly before his death.

== Politics ==
Crysler represented Dundas in the Legislative Assembly of the Province of Canada from 1848 to 1851 and from 1854 to 1857.

He was appointed registrar for the County in 1867.

== Later life ==
Crysler owned the west half of Lot 18 in Winchester Township, land that would become the village of Chesterville. He died at his home in Morrisburg, Ontario on April 7, 1881, at the age of 80. His wife, the former Mary Westley, predeceased him.

His home, Crysler Hall, is now preserved as part of Upper Canada Village.
