= Richard Duncan =

Richard Duncan may refer to:

- Richard Duncan (Upper Canada politician) (died 1819), Canadian soldier, judge and political figure
- Richard M. Duncan (1889–1974), U.S. Representative from Missouri
- Richard Duncan (athlete) (born 1973), Canadian athlete
- Rick Duncan (Richard Joe Duncan), American football player

== See also ==
- Richard Duncan Fraser (c. 1784–1857), fur trader, businessman, farmer and political figure in Upper Canada
