= Dundas County Militia =

Regiment of the provincial militia of Upper Canada

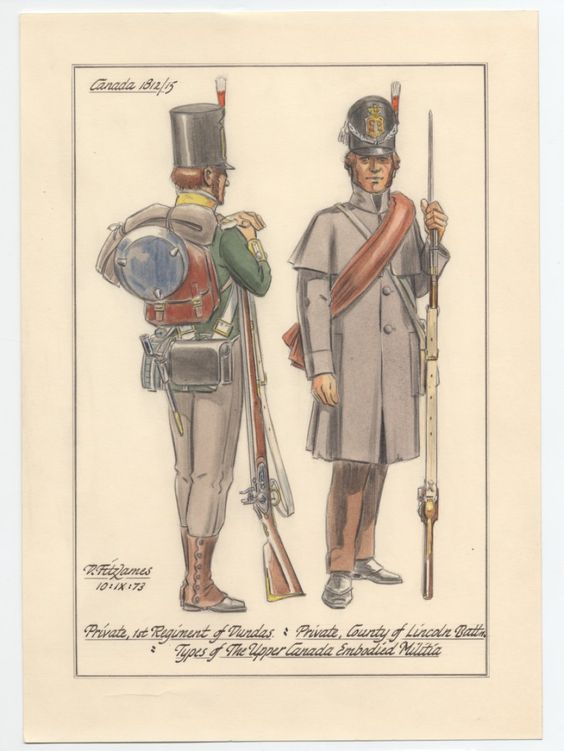
- A Dundas County Militia private (left) in 1813
- Active: 1788 – 1890s
- Country: Upper Canada
- Allegiance: United Kingdom of Great Britain and Ireland
- Branch: Canadian Militia
- Type: Militia
- Size: Regiment
- Anniversaries: 11 November (Crysler's Farm)
- Engagements: Spanish Armament; War of 1812; Battle of Matilda; First Battle of Ogdensburg; Battle of French Mills; Second Battle of Ogdensburg; Battle of Point Iroquois; Skirmish at Doran's Farm; Battle of Crysler's Farm; Raid on Madrid; Salmon River Raid; Rebellions of 1837–1838; Patriot War; Battle of the Windmill; Fenian Raids; Prescott; Cornwall

Commanders
- Notable commanders: Richard Duncan; Allan MacDonell; Thomas Fraser; John Crysler

The Dundas County Militia, also commonly known as the Dundas Militia, was a regiment of the provincial militia of Upper Canada that was raised in Dundas County, Ontario, in the 1780s. The battle honours and legacy of the Dundas Militia are perpetuated by the Stormont, Dundas and Glengarry Highlanders.

== United Empire Loyalists and Establishment ==
The military history of Dundas County dates back to the early settlement days, when Loyalist veterans of the American Revolution were granted plots of land in Upper Canada and raised a local militia. The first Loyalist settlers landed in Dundas on the banks of the St Lawrence River in June 1784 and almost immediately raised a local militia force. Many of the families were German Palatines who had remained loyal to Great Britain and fought during the war with the King's Royal Regiment of New York, Butler's Rangers, and Loyal Rangers.

The oldest commission found for what would become the Dundas Militia is from 20 June 1788, when Jacob Farrand (Farran) was issued a commission as a Captain by Lord Dorchester in the Williamsburg and Matilda Battalion of Militia. In 1792, Dundas County was formally established by a proclamation of the lieutenant governor of Upper Canada, John Graves Simcoe, and by his orders each county would have a Lieutenant to fulfill the position of magistrate and militia commander, Richard Duncan serving as the first lieutenant and colonel of the Dundas Militia in 1793.

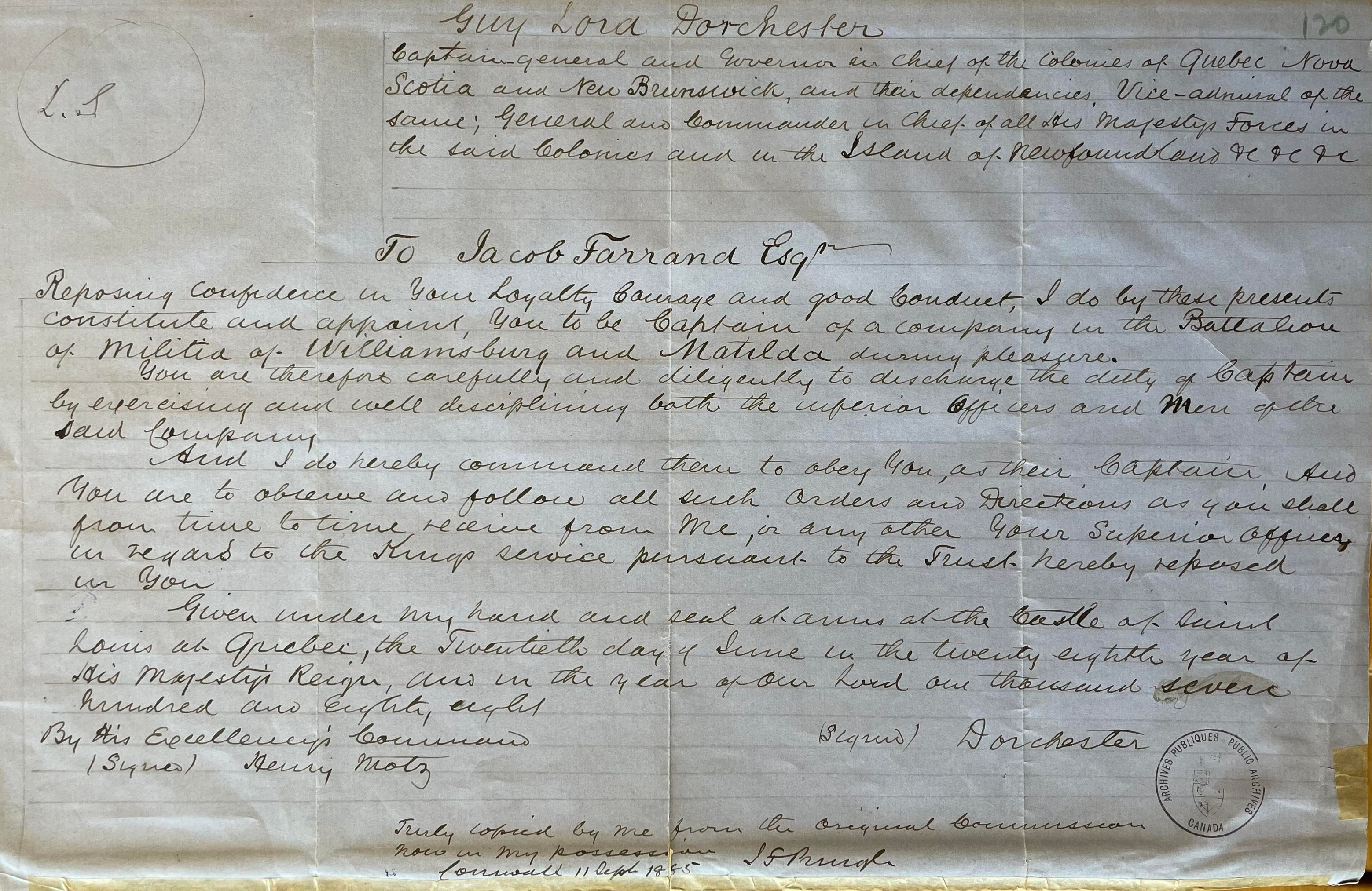
Copy of the 1788 militia commission of Capt. Jacob Farrand

The Spanish Armament of 1793 caused fear throughout the British colonies, and many militias were raised in the Canadas in case of the outbreak of war. Colonel Duncan commanded the Dundas Militia and many men joined the part-time force. War was averted, however, and the militias were not used in any military capacity, but it showed the importance of the volunteer militias to the defence of Upper Canada.

By 1803, the regiment had grown in size, and a report from that year lists the following officers:

- Lt-Col. Allan McDonell
- Maj. Malcolm McMartin
- Capts. Michael Hanes, Farquhar McDonell, Cornelius Munro, Allan Patterson
- Lts. Jacob Merkley, Henry Merkley, Michael Ault, Jacob Weager, Jesse Wright, John Serviss.
- Ens. John Shaver, John Munro, Frederick Weaver, Jacob Van Allen, Michael Carman
- Adj. Jacob Weaver
- Q.M. Alexander McDonell

The 1808 report, resulting from the war tensions due to the Chesapeake–Leopard affair, gives the following statistics of the regiment: 1 Lt-Colonel, 1 Major, 4 Captains, 5 Lieutenants, 6 Ensigns, 1 Adjutant, 1 Quartermaster, 1 Surgeon, 14 Sergeants and 238 rank and file.

== War of 1812 ==
When the War of 1812 broke out in June 1812, the Dundas Militiamen gathered to prevent an invasion of their homeland. The men mustered into two flank companies at Mariatown on 11 July 1812, and the companies were formed into the 1st Regiment of Dundas Militia. This regiment fought throughout the war, with many men from the regiment being transferred to the Incorporated Battalion of Canadian Militia fighting in the Niagara campaign and at the Battle of Lundy's Lane.

The principle engagements of the 1st Regiment of Dundas Militia were:

Battle of Matilda – On 16 September 1812, soldiers from the 1st Dundas Militia under Capt. Michael Ault and Ens. Duncan Clark, as well as the Royal Newfoundland Regiment, were escorting a shipment of supplies from Montreal to Kingston when they were attacked near Matilda by 500 American Militia who were hiding on Toussaint Island. The Dundas militia landed on Presqu'ile Island just as an American force landed on the same and an exchange of fire occurred. The Americans were driven back and retreated to Toussaint's Island, and soon more Dundas men arrived on Presqu'ile in case of a second invasion. Col. MacDonell in command of the Dundas Militia, along with Capt. Shaver and Capt. Ault were joined by Grenville Militia and a 9-pounder artillery piece from Prescott that had originally been captured during the Battle of the Thousand Islands. After a few rounds of fire from the cannon and muskets, the Americans abandoned the island and retreated across the border. Canadian losses were one killed and several wounded.

First Battle of Ogdensburg – The Dundas Militia next fought at the FirstBattle of Ogdensburg on 4 October 1812, launching an amphibious raid from Prescott to gather supplies but being turned back by American artillery and militia.

Battle of French Mills – New York State Militia captured the British post at Akwesasne, an Indian community that straddled the St. Lawrence River in a location where the present-day borders of Ontario, Quebec and New York State intersect. It, and the nearby American post at French Mills on the Salmon River, were recaptured on November 23, 1812, by a British Canadian force, including the Dundas Militia, carrying supplies up the St. Lawrence River.

In early 1813, Thomas Fraser took command of the Dundas Militia from Col. Macdonell, who retired due to old age, having first seen battle at Culloden. Fraser served as Colonel until late 1813.

Second Battle of Ogdensburg – On 22 February 1813, a British Canadian force including the 1st Regiment of Dundas Militia, crossed the frozen St Lawrence River and charged the American fort at Ogdensburg. The Americans fought back but were eventually forced to retreat and the British and Canadians captured the town, burning the boats and taking the artillery and military supplies back to Prescott.

Clark's Ride - On 5 November, as Wilkinson's American army moved down the St. Lawrence River towards Cornwall, Lieutenant Duncan Clark of the Incorporated Militia, formerly an Ensign in Capt. Ault's Flank Company of the 1st Dundas Regiment, was on duty on the shoreline and under orders to raise the alarm upon any American movements. Seeing the mass of boats moving down the river, Lieutenant Clark commandeered a sturdy plough horse from a nearby farm and rode the length of the front from Elizabethtown to Prescott alerting the local militia and civilians with the cry "The enemy is at hand!". His ride along the front was likened to the ride of Paul Revere in 1775, and Duncan Clark has since been heralded as the "Canadian Paul Revere".

Battle of Point Iroquois - American forces under General James Wilkinson crossed the St Lawrence River and hoped to march on Montreal, but the local British and Canadian forces engaged them before they could move past Dundas County. On 7 November, a piquet of Dundas Militia at Point Iroquois discovered the American forces moving up the St Lawrence, and Ptes. Peter and Jacob Brouse, brothers of George Brouse, were the first to fire upon the enemy. As more Dundas Militiamen were brought up to the point, 1,200 American soldiers under Alexander Macomb, Winfield Scott, and Benjamin Forsyth landed on the shore and began to engage the outnumbered militia. After a sharp firefight, the 200 men from the 1st Dundas Regiment were forced to retire inland, but the delaying action gave precious time to the forces in Cornwall and Morrisburg.

Skirmish at Doran's Farm - With the advance of Wilkinson's Army towards Montreal in November 1813, a line of supply boats under military escort set out from Montreal to ascend the St. Lawrence River and bring much needed supplies to the British forces at Prescott. An American force posted on Ogden's Island noticed the approaching convoy and decided to capture the supplies. Suspecting danger, the British force brought their boats to a halt and the supplies destined for Prescott were landed in Dundas County where the services of the farmers in the vicinity were secured and before midnight the stores were all placed in wagons, by which manner they were to be taken to Prescott, while the boats were to return to Cornwall. Suddenly a messenger arrived and reported the presence of 500 American dragoons. The loaded wagons were removed some distance from the river where they delayed for a time before proceeding to Prescott. Instructions were given to those in charge of the boats to drop down the river as far as Hoople's Creek, while the handful of Glengarry and Dundas Militia, already worn out with fatigue, started eastward to meet the foe. The force of Glengarry and Dundas Militiamen sighted the advancing American forces at the Doran family farm near Iroquois and at once concealed themselves in the wood lines. As the Americans drew near, a well directed fire from the Militia killed 11 and wounded several. The Americans fled to their boats and recrossed to the other side of the river, while the militia marched to Hoople's Creek, joined the flotilla awaiting them, and proceeded to Cornwall in preparation of the main American attack.

Burning of the Nash Creek bridge - As the American forces pushed east through Williamsburg township, Trooper John W. Loucks of Fraser's Provincial Light Dragoons, formerly of the 1st Dundas Regiment, was on duty at the bridge over Nash Creek. When the advance parties of the American army came into view, Trooper Loucks set fire to the Nash Creek Bridge in order to prevent their advance. He then rode east to alert the Dundas Militia before riding north and west around the American force to contact the British forces coming from Kingston.

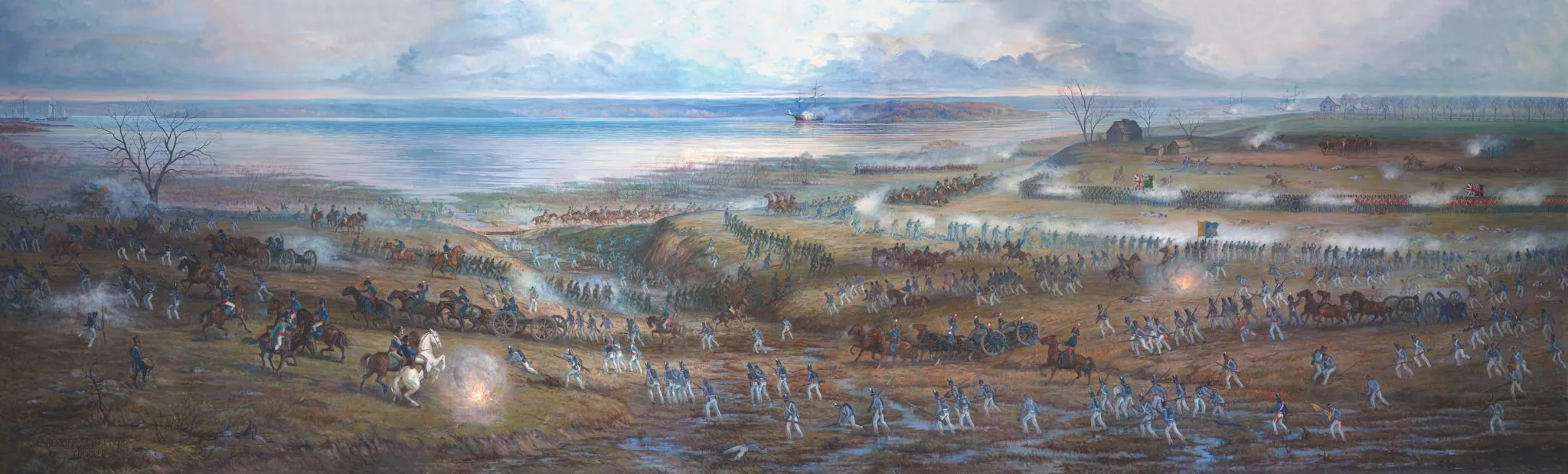
The Battle of Crysler's Farm

Battle of Crysler's Farm – On 10 November, a force of Glengarry and Stormont Militia engaged the Americans at the Battle of Hoople's Creek and on 11 November, they, along with the Dundas Militia, Leeds Militia, Canadian Fencibles, the 49th Regiment of Foot and the 89th Regiment of Foot, engaged the main American force at John Crysler's farm in Williamsburg township. Capt. John Crysler was now in command of the Dundas Militia and, with Major Henry Merkley, led the regiment bravely at the battle, where they served as stretcher bearers, skirmishers, and helped supply ammunition.

Salmon River Raid – In February 1814, the American forces near French Mills began leaving their supply depots and garrisons for Plattsburgh and Sackett's Harbor. On the 19th, a British Canadian force including the Dundas Militia crossed to the Salmon River, setting fire to the abandoned boats and barracks of the Americans, capturing considerable amounts of ammunition and supplies to bring back to Dundas.

From September 1812 until the end of the war, the 1st Dundas Regiment was engaged in building and garrisoning earthworks and blockhouses along the St. Lawrence River. One such earthwork was located at Point Iroquois, and named Fort Provost. The initial earthwork was reconstructed as a blockhouse in 1814 was renamed Fort Needless due to its inactivity so late in the war.

In mid-1813, two volunteer cavalry troops were raised in the area and filled with men from the Dundas Militia. Captain Fraser's Troop of Provincial Light Dragoons and Captain Adam's Troop of Provincial Light Dragoons both fought alongside the Dundas Militia at Crysler's Farm.

Casualties of the 1st Dundas Militia
Soldier	Casualty	Action
Unnamed Private	Killed in action	Matilda (16 Sept. 1812)
Unnamed Private	Wounded in action	Matilda (16 Sept. 1812)
Capt. John Macdonell	Wounded in action	Ogdensburg (22 Feb. 1813)
Pte. James Stamp	Wounded in action	Ogdensburg (22 Feb. 1813)
Pte. Frederick Ouderkirk	Killed in action	Ogdensburg (22 Feb. 1813)
Capt. Jesse Wright	Died of disease	Fort Wellington (1 Mar. 1813)
Ens. William Welsh	Died of disease	(1814)
Pte. John McKay	Accidentally wounded, loss of eye	Fort Wellington (22 Oct. 1814)
Pte. Joseph Lurcher	Died	(1812-13)
Pte. James Seanex	Died	(1812-13)

=== Medals ===
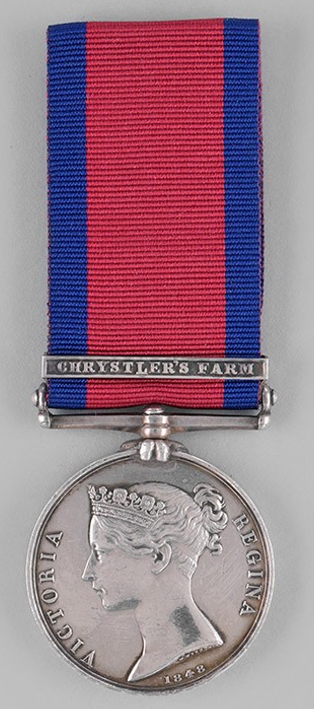
Military General Service Medal awarded to Sgt. Peter Brouse, Dundas Militia

In 1848, the Military General Service Medal was created with a clasp for Crysler's Farm and the following men were awarded the medal for service with the Dundas Militia:

- Capt. John Crysler
- Sgts. Peter Brouse, John Cook, John Loucks
- Ptes. Nicholas L. Ault, Peter Baker, Jacob Brouse, George Cook, John Doran, Frederick Laut, Peter Loucks, Angus McKay, John Pillar, Robert Redman, Conrad Kintner, Joseph Langevin, John Strader, Edward Shaver, Robert Thompson

== Rebellions of 1837–1838 ==
On 21 January 1822, the Dundas Cavalry Troop was formed under Capt. Peter Shaver, Michael Brouse and George Ault commissioned Lieutenants, Jacob Brouse commissioned Cornet. The Dundas Troop of Horse was attached to the Dundas Militia regiments into the 1850s, and served duty at Prescott under Capt. Ault during the Rebellion in 1838, and at Cornwall in 1839.

In 1837, the 1st Regiment of Dundas Militia was reorganized into two battalions, or regiments, to better serve the new townships of Winchester and Mountain. The 1st Regiment (Battalion) would serve Winchester and Williamsburg and was commanded by Col. John Crysler and Lt. Col. J. MacDonell. The 2nd Regiment (Battalion) would serve Mountain and Matilda and was commanded by Col. George Merkley and Lt. Col. MacDonell.

With the outbreak of the Rebellions of 1837–1838 the two regiments of Dundas Militia were again called out for the defence of the county. On 12 November 1838, men of the Hunters' Lodges came ashore in Prescott and took refuge in the windmill there, and a force of British Regulars along with the Grenville Militia, Glengarry Highlanders, Incorporated Militia, and Dundas Militia were dispatched to drive them back across the St Lawrence River. At the Battle of the Windmill, a force of 300 men from the 1st Dundas Regiment, commanded by Col. John Crysler, and the 2nd Dundas Regiment, commanded by Col. George Merkley, participated in the main attack on 13 November and were present for the surrender on 16 November. Casualties from the Dundas Militia were three killed and eight wounded. It was during the Rebellion period that the regiments were collectively referred to as the Royal Dundas Militia, perhaps due to their gallant conduct at the battle, as evidenced on the flag of the 2nd Dundas Regiment.

Casualties of the Royal Dundas Militia
Soldier	Company and Regiment	Casualty
Pte. Jeremiah Bouck	Capt. Doran's Company; 2nd Dundas Regiment	Killed in action
Pte. J. McMartin	2nd Dundas Regiment	Killed in action
Pte. Richard Boulton	2nd Dundas Regiment	Died of wounds
Lt. John Parlow (great-grandfather of Kathleen and Maida Parlow)	Capt. Doran's Company; 2nd Dundas Regiment	Severely wounded in action
Sgt. John A. Shaver	Capt. Crysler's Company; 1st Dundas Regiment	Wounded in action
Pte. William Errington	Capt. Crysler's Company; 1st Dundas Regiment	Wounded in action
Pte. John Devline	Capt. Doran's Company; 2nd Dundas Regiment	Wounded in action
Pte. Francis Fye	2nd Dundas Regiment	Wounded in action
Pte. William Myers	Capt. Doran's Company; 2nd Dundas Regiment	Wounded in action
Pte. James Connovers	2nd Dundas Regiment	Wounded in action
Pte. William Lennox	Capt. Shaver's Company; 2nd Dundas Regiment	Wounded in action

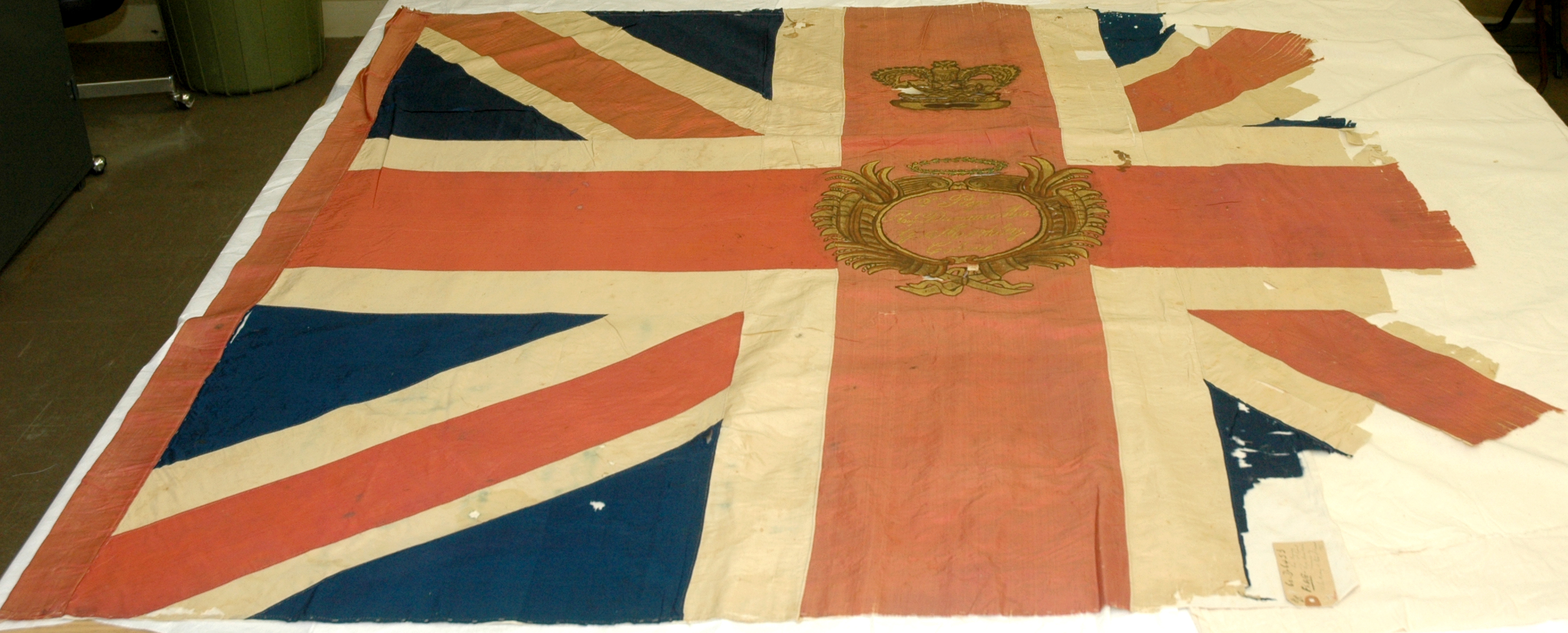
Flag of the 2nd Dundas Regiment, carried at the Battle of the Windmill

Following the Battle of the Windmill, the 1st and 2nd Regiments (Battalions) of Dundas Militia were presented with a set of colours, emblazoned with the emblem of a windmill in recognition of their heroic actions at the battle. Col. John Crysler applied to Lt-Gen. Sir John Colborne for the authority for the regiments to carry this device on their colours. When the Crysler's Farm Monument was unveiled on 25 September 1895, the Morrisburg High School Cadets carried a flag that had been borne by the 2nd Dundas Regiment (Battalion) at the Battle of the Windmill.

== Reorganization of the Militia ==
In 1842, the Dundas Militia was reorganized, being split into three battalions. The 1st Battalion would serve Williamsburg Township, the 2nd Battalion would serve Matilda Township, and the 3rd Battalion would serve Winchester and Mountain Townships. In 1846, These battalions were grouped to form part of the larger "Regiment of the Eastern District", a united regiment composed of the seven battalions from Stormont, Dundas, and Glengarry to serve all three counties.

The Militia lists for 1851 record the following officers of the Dundas Militia with their dates of rank:

1st Battalion (Williamsburg):

Lt Col. John Crysler - 5 Nov. 1846

Majors Cephranus Casselman - 13 Jan. 1847, John P. Crysler - 16 Aug. 1850

Captains John Hickey, George Cook, William Kyle, Isaac N. Rose, Adam Nudle, George Weaver, Henry Weagear, William Swayne - 13 Jan. 1847, Conrad Casselman - 19 Dec. 1850

Lieutenants Josiah Southworth, Peter J. Loucks, John W. Loucks, Alex. Colquhoun, Walter Bell, John Marsellis, Cornelius Nevins - 13 Jan. 1847, Samuel J. Crysler, Pembroke G. Crysler - 7 Oct. 1847, Jacob Merkley - 19 Dec. 1850

Ensigns Michael Pellar, John Brouse, William Weaver, John Munro - 13 Jan. 1847, Samuel Weagant, Michael Hickey, Seph. M. Casselman, William Dicks, Guy J. Loucks - 7 Oct. 1847, John R. Crysler - 19 Dec. 1850

Adjutant James Baker - 7 Oct. 1847

Quarter Master Jacob Hanes - 13 Jan. 1847

Surgeon John Grant - Jan, 13, 1847

2nd Battalion (Matilda):

Lt Col. David Robertson - 9 Dec. 1846

Major George Ault - 31 Mar. 1847

Captains John Savor, George Brouse, Sydney Doren, James West, Samuel Shaver, John Strader, Simeon Ault - 31 Mar. 1847, John Parlow - 25 Sep. 1850

Lieutenants David Coons, George Carman, Alonzo C. H. Shaver, James Doren, Nicholas N. Brouse, Isaac Keeler, Alex. Macdonell, Henry Van Allen - 31 Mar. 1847, Matthew Coons - 25 Sep. 1850

Ensigns Nicholas Carman, George J. Brouse, Henry Merkley, John Flagg, Alonzo B. Robertson, James N. Nettleton, John Servis, James Glasford - 31 Mar. 1847, David Mcintosh - 2 Aug. 1847

Adjutant Nicholas N. Brouse - 31 Mar. 1847

Quarter Master George Robertson - 2 Aug. 1847

3rd Battalion (Winchester and Mountain):

Lt Col. Peter Shaver - 5 Nov. 1846

Major Jacob Brouse - 24 Mar. 1847

Captains William S. Shaver, Robert Grey, John Dillabough, James A. Liddle, John Van Camp, Edward Brouse, George T. Shaver - 24 Mar. 1847, Elijah Van Camp, Andrew Summers, Peter Smith - 12 May 1847

Lieutenants William Shaver Jr., Henry H. Boulton - 24 Mar. 1847, Marcus (Mark) Redmond, Robert O. Mullen, Joseph Hindman, James Slater, Thomas Armstrong, George Fitchell, Charles Parker, Alex. H. Monro, Reuben Shaver - 12 May 1847

Ensigns John Armstrong, John White, Hezekiah Clark, Edward Price, Andrew Sipes, George Dillabough, Samuel Bigford, David Farrell, Giles W. Bogart, John McCargar - 12 May 1847

Adjutant Edward Brouse - 24 Mar. 1847

Quarter Master William Laing - 12 May 1847

In 1852, the "Regiment of the Eastern District" was disbanded and returned to individual county regiments, with the 3rd Battalion, Dundas Militia being split into two battalions; the '3rd Battalion' serving Mountain Township, and the new '4th Battalion' serving Winchester Township. The first two battalions remained the same.

With the passage of the Militia Act of 1855, the militia of Canada was separated into the Active Militia and the Sedentary militia, which was further separated into the Service and Non-Service Militia. The counties of Leeds, Dundas, Stormont and Glengarry became part of Military District No. 2.

A Military General Order published on 7 February 1856, stipulates the undress uniform for officers of the sedentary militia as such:

- Frock Coat - Blue, double breasted, with a stand up collar rounded off at the front; cuffs and lapels all blue, two rows of buttons down the front, nine in each row. A crimson silk cord to be worn on the left shoulder to hold the sash.
- Trousers - Oxford miniature, with a scarlet welt down the outward seam during Autumn and Winter, and white linen during the Summer.
- Forage Cap - Blue cloth with black leather peak. Band of silk, maple leaf lace, with the name of the regiment and the number of the battalion thereof, worked in silver embroidery; the number to one inch and a half long.

The militia report for 1858 lists the following officers and their dates of commission:

- 1st Battalion (Williamsburg) – Commanded by Lt-Col. Alexander Macdonell – 19 March 1852
- 2nd Battalion (Matilda) – Commanded by Lt-Col. David Robertson – 9 December 1846
- 3rd Battalion (Mountain) – Commanded by Lt-Col. Edward Brouse – 3 April 1856
- 4th Battalion (Winchester) – Commanded by Lt-Col. Jacob Brouse – 13 May 1853

The militia report for 1859 lists the following strength of the Dundas Militia:

- 1st Battalion (Williamsburg) – Commanded by Lt-Col. A.G. Macdonell, with 726 men fit for service and 187 in reserve, a total of 913 for the township.
- 2nd Battalion (Matilda) – Commanded by Lt-Col. David Robertson, with 548 men fit for service and 150 in reserve, a total of 698 for the township.
- 3rd Battalion (Mountain) – Commanded by Lt-Col. Edward Brouse, with 434 men fit for service and 35 in reserve, a total of 469 for the township.
- 4th Battalion (Winchester) – Commanded by Lt-Col. John Pliny Crysler, with 549 men fit for service and 114 in reserve, a total of 663 for the township.

Total strength of regiment: 2,983

The militia report for 1863 lists the following strength of the Dundas Militia:

- 1st Battalion (Williamsburg) – Commanded by Lt-Col. A.G. Macdonell, 321 1st Class servicemen, 416 2nd class servicemen, 191 in reserve, total of 928
- 2nd Battalion (Matilda) – Commanded by Lt-Col. David Robertson, 246 1st Class servicemen, 383 2nd Class servicemen, 144 in reserve, total of 773
- 3rd Battalion (Mountain) – Commanded by Lt-Col. Edward Brouse, 210 1st Class servicemen, 256 2nd Class servicemen, 64 in reserve, total of 530
- 4th Battalion (Winchester) – Commanded by Lt-Col. John Pliny Crysler, 188 1st Class servicemen, 368 2nd Class servicemen, 128 in reserve, total of 624

Total strength of regiment: 2,855

== Volunteer Militia and Amalgamation ==
With the outbreak of the Crimean War in 1854, the garrison of regular British soldiers left Canada to fight and the colonial government issued the Militia Act to raise active volunteer militia companies in Canada for the defence of the province. A number of such volunteer companies were proposed and formed in Dundas at this time:

- 1st Williamsburg (Dundas) Rifle Company – Formed originally in Morrisburg on 16 October 1856, under Capt. Martin Carman, William Gordon commissioned Lieutenant, William Casselman commissioned Ensign, George Dillon commissioned Ensign (1861). Capt. Carman retired in 1857 and was replaced by Capt. James Holden.
- Williamsburg Troop of Volunteer Cavalry – Formed originally on 16 October 1856, under Captain George W. Brouse, J.A. Weegar commissioned Lieutenant, J.G. Merkley commissioned Cornet. The troop was disbanded in 1858
- Volunteer Rifle Company of Winchester - petitioned to be raised in Chesterville on 19 September 1857, under Capt. John McCuaig, Lt. George Ford, and Ens. William Garvey. In November, John Capell replaced Capt. McCuaig, but the company was rejected in 1858 due to lack open positions in the militia.

During the early 1860s there was much fear in the Province about a possible war between Great Britain and the United States. The Trent Affair and Chesapeake Affair caused alarm along the border and more volunteer militia companies were raised in Dundas.

The first 'militia rifle company' raised in Dundas in consequence of the Trent Affair was the Morrisburg Rifle Company, formed on 22 January 1862, under the command of Captain Alexander Farlinger, Asaph Bradley Sherman commissioned Lieutenant, Charles P. Empey commissioned Ensign. This company was disbanded in November 1862

By the mid-1860s there were at least three other volunteer infantry companies joining the 1st Williamsburg Rifles:

- Morrisburg (Dundas) Infantry Company – Formed in Morrisburg on 19 December 1862, under Captain Isaac N. Rose, William D. Meikle commissioned Lieutenant, Samuel Garvey commissioned Ensign
- Dixon's Corners Infantry Company - Formed on 2 January 1863, at Dixon's Corners under Capt. Robert Lowrey, Adam I. Dixon commissioned Lieutenant, Josephus Rose commissioned Ensign.
- 2nd Dundas Drill Association – Formed on 16 January 1863, in Matilda Township under Lt-Col. George Shaver as a ‘drill association’, composed of Officers and NCOs from the 2nd Dundas Militia.

As well as two volunteer artillery companies:

- Volunteer Militia Foot Artillery Company of Morrisburg – under Capt. Thomas S. Rubidge, raised on 14 February 1862, Lt. Henry Merkley, 2nd Lt. Guy Loucks. Reorganized as the Morrisburg Garrison Artillery in November 1865. Became No. 3 Battery, Provisional Brigade of Garrison Artillery of Prescott on 5 October 1866. Renumbered as No. 2 Battery, Provisional Brigade of Garrison Artillery of Prescott on 12 April 1867. The unit was disbanded on 23 October 1868.
- Volunteer Militia Foot Artillery Company of Iroquois – Capt. Alexander McDonell and Capt. John Ross, raised on 8 May 1862, Lt. Rufus Carman, 2nd Lt. Samuel Boyd. Reorganized as the Iroquois Garrison Battery in 1865. Became No. 4 Battery, Provisional Brigade of Garrison Artillery of Prescott on 8 October 1866. Renumbered as No. 3 Battery, Provisional Brigade of Garrison Artillery of Prescott on 12 April 1867. The unit was attached to the 56th Grenville Battalion of Infantry on 14 May 1869. It became an Independent battery on 10 May 1872, and disbanded on 27 March 1874.

The volunteer Infantry and Rifle companies were stood down in April 1864 in consequence of being disorganized

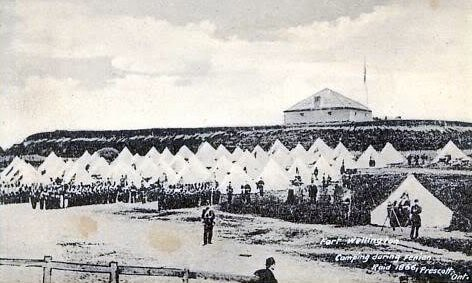
Militia camp at Fort Wellington during the Fenian Raid, 1866

=== Fenian Raids ===
During the Fenian Raids in 1866, the Dundas artillery companies were called out for service along the St Lawrence River frontier, serving at Prescott and Cornwall. According to the book Troublous Times in Canada: A History of the Fenian Raids of 1866 and 1870:

"On the 15th of November, 1865, the following volunteer corps were called out for Frontier Service, and were stationed at the following places, the whole force being under the command of the Lieutenant-General commanding Her Majesty's Forces in North America:"-

"At Prescott:- The Morrisburg Garrison Battery of Artillery: Capt. Thomas S. Rubidge, 1st Lt. Peter A. Eagleson, and 2nd Lt. G. S. L. Stoddart."

In the spring of 1866, an attack on Prescott and subsequent advance to Ottawa was prevented by the presence of a considerable force of volunteers, including two companies from Dundas, and a British gunboat on the river. The Fenians then moved eastward to Malone and vicinity, and an attack on Cornwall was expected, but the presence of three thousand troops there again dissuaded them from attacking. On 1 July 1866, a force of approximately 1,600 Fenians under General O'Neill appeared on the banks of the St. Lawrence across from Morrisburg. Theodore F. Chamberlain of Captain Rose's Dundas Infantry Company was sent by personal orders from Sir John A. Macdonald to follow the Fenians and report back on their positions. After two weeks the threat of invasion was gone and Chamberlain returned to Morrisburg.

James Whitney, MPP for Dundas from 1888 to 1914, served as a Sergeant with the Cornwall Volunteer Infantry alongside the Dundas companies during the Fenian Raids in 1866.

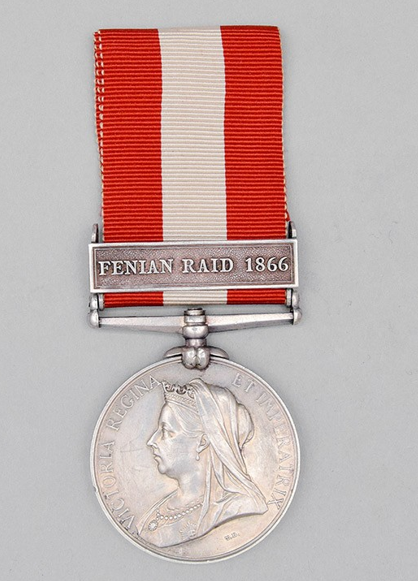
Fenian Raid Medal to Gnr. Almon Casselman, Morrisburg Garrison Artillery

In 1899, veterans of the Fenian Raids were awarded the Canada General Service Medal and the following are names of the men from Dundas County who received the medal for service in 1866 with:

The Morrisburg Garrison Artillery:

- Capt. Thomas S. Rubidge
- Q.M. Sgt. Frederick Carman
- Sgts. Matthias Brice, Henry Moore, James Fox, Joseph Lane
- Cpls. John Pyper, Erastus Heagle, Joseph Sherbenaut, Levi McMartin, David Simpson
- Ptes. Erastus Winegard, Charles Hughes, Gregory Brendstetter, Charles Colligan, Alexander Holmes, Sidney Merkley, James Porteous, William Rice, William James Simpson, Melvin Carman
- Gnrs. Cephrenus Hopper, John Hunter, Silas Hunter, John McPhee, John McMartin, Duncan Armstrong, Almon Casselman, Horace L. Casselman, Edward Cooper, Silas Merkley, Albert Porteous, Pliny Stata, Robert C. Stewart
- Bndsmn. Esra Cutler

The Iroquois Garrison Artillery:

- Lt. Samuel I. Boyd
- Sgts. William Millar, Francis Rourke, Charles Z. Skinner, Edward McRobie,
- Cpls. James Price, J. A. Stewart,
- Ptes. Samuel Morris, James F. Macdonell, John Lahue, Nathan Burley, Guy Shaver, Thomas Warren, Daniel Armstrong, John Black, Angus Grant, Edward Strader, Thomas Campbell, William A. Warren, Alexander Eamon, Thomas Tuergeon, Eugene Serviss, Hiram Serviss, Joseph Hutt
- Gnrs. Charles Shaver, William C. Hartle, Elijah Serviss, Duncan Armstrong, William Jennack, John Kane,
- Bglr. William Moore

Another Fenian Raid was launched on 24 May 1870, and Cornwall was again filled with soldiers. The force consisted of the 59th Cornwall Battalion, 18th Hawkesbury, 41st Brockville, the Ottawa Garrison Artillery and Field Battery and the Iroquois Garrison Artillery, 1,027 men in all. For a few days excitement ran high, but the routing of the Fenians at the Battle of Pigeon Hill and Battle of Trout River forced the early disbandment of the militia. Men from Dundas County served along the St. Lawrence River again during this period.

The following men received the Canada General Service Medal for service in 1870 with the Iroquois Garrison Artillery:

- Sgts. William Millar, Edward McRobie, Joseph F. Millar
- Cpls. Byron M. Hutchison
- Ptes. George W. Armstrong, John N. Caloren, Timothy Caloren, George E. Caloren, John Lahue, James McNairn, Eugene Serviss, Hiram Serviss, Francis Smith, William Lewis Soules, Ed W. Wylie
- Gnrs. Duncan Armstrong, William C. Hartle, Frederick McRobie, Andrew Reichardt, Philip T. Roberts, Jesse Wallace, William Warren

=== Amalgamation ===
Following Confederation, in 1869 the sedentary county militias were formed into a militia reserve of the Non-Permanent Active Militia. The four non-service (sedentary) battalions of the Dundas Militia, as part of the Militia Reserve, was organized into the Regimental Division of Dundas, and consisted of six companies with a total strength of 3,609 men. The Dundas Reserve Militia was commanded by Lt-Col. Alexander G. Macdonell (1st Dundas), Maj. John P. Crysler (4th Dundas), and Maj. George F. Shaver (2nd Dundas) with the following companies:

- 1st (Iroquois & West Matilda) Company - Capt. Nicholas N. Brouse, Lt. Guy Ault, Ens. William J. Shaver
- 2nd (East Matilda) Company - Capt. Sidney Doran, Lt. Samuel Robertson, Ens. Philip Ault. Capt. Doran was replaced by Abraham Van Allen in 1870.
- 3rd (Morrisburg & West Williamsburg) Company - Capt. Isaac N. Rose, Lt. William Deeks, Ens. George H. Marcellus
- 4th (Centre Commons & East Williamsburg) Company - Capt. John Brouse, Lt. Michael W. Hickey, Ens. Alpheus S. Merkley
- 5th (Mountain) Company - Capt. Joseph Hyndman, Lt. John Renwick, Ens. John Price
- 6th (Winchester) Company - Capt. Giles W. Bogart, Lt. David Rae, Ens. Jeremiah Fitzgibbon

In 1880, two new companies were formed (from the 1st and 3rd companies) for the Dundas Reserve Militia:

- 7th (Morrisburg) Company - Capt. James P. Whitney
- 8th (Iroquois) Company - Capt. Homer Hugo Ross

On 30 May 1885, James Whitney was promoted to Major of the Dundas Reserve, succeeding Maj. J.P. Crysler who had died. Jeremiah Fitzgibbon of No. 6 Company was appointed Captain of No. 7 Company, with Charles Bradfield and Charles McMartin being appointed Lieutenants in the company.

On 2 March 1889, Whitney was promoted to Lieutenant-Colonel in command of the Dundas Reserve Militia, replacing Col. Macdonell who had died.

Due to the lack of volunteer infantry or rifle companies in Dundas County in the late 1860s, there was no Active Militia regiment for Dundas from 1870-1890s, so men from Dundas County served alternately with the 59th (Stormont and Glengarry) Battalion of Infantry, or the 56th (Prescott) Battalion of Infantry.

Dr. Robert Reddick (1848-1930), a prominent physician in Winchester, served as a Private with the 56th Grenville Regiment (Lisgar Rifles) during the Fenian Raid of 1870, and later as a Field Surgeon with the Midland Battalion in the North-West Rebellion.

In 1898, a cavalry squadron was raised in Glen Stewart as D Squadron of the 4th Hussars of Canada under Capt. Urias Holmes with Lt. J.W.B. Coates and Lt Garnet H. Irvine. The squadron moved to Hanesville in 1909 and served until after the First World War.

In 1899, an infantry company was raised in Iroquois as No.1 Company of the 56th Grenville Regiment (Lisgar Rifles). The Iroquois Company was commanded by Capt. W.F. Carstairs, with Lt. Duncan A. Macdonell and Lt. W.J. Purkis. Macdonell eventually took command of the company and it was renumbered No.2 Company until it was disbanded in 1906.

In 1908, an infantry company was raised in Morrisburg as B Company of the 59th Stormont and Glengarry Regiment under Capt. W.J. Baker with Lt. G.P.V. Lawless. The company served until after the First World War.

During the First World War, Dundas men served with the 154th (Stormont-Dundas-Glengarry) Battalion, CEF. Due to recruitment by the 154th in all three counties, in the 1920s, the 59th Regiment would officially gain the Dundas recognition as the Stormont, Dundas and Glengarry Highlanders. Dundas residents served honourably during the South African War, First World War, Second World War, and into the modern era.

== Dundas Militiamen ==
=== Roll of Honour ===
Dundas Militia Roll of Honour 1812 - 1864
Soldier	Regiment	Casualty	Action
Unnamed Private	Capt. Ault's Company; 1st Dundas Militia	Killed in action	Battle of Matilda (16 Sept. 1812)
Pte. Frederick Ouderkirk	1st Dundas Militia	Killed in action	Battle of Ogdensburg (22 Feb. 1813)
Capt. Jesse Wright	1st Dundas Militia	Died of disease	Fort Wellington (1 Mar. 1813)
Ens. William Welsh	1st Dundas Militia	Died of disease	(1814)
Pte. Joseph Lurcher	1st Dundas Militia	Died	(1812-13)
Pte. James Seanex	1st Dundas Militia	Died	(1812-13)
Pte. Jeremiah Bouck	Capt. Doran's Company; 2nd Dundas Regiment	Killed in action	Battle of the Windmill (13 Nov. 1838)
Pte. J. McMartin	2nd Dundas Regiment	Killed in action	Battle of the Windmill (13 Nov. 1838)
Pte. Richard Boulton	2nd Dundas Regiment	Died of wounds	Battle of the Windmill (13 Nov. 1838)
Gnr. Macdonell	Iroquois Garrison Artillery	Died from drowning	Fort Wellington (2 Dec. 1864)
Unnamed Gunner	Iroquois Garrison Artillery	Died from drowning	Fort Wellington (2 Dec. 1864)
Unnamed Gunner	Iroquois Garrison Artillery	Died from drowning	Fort Wellington (2 Dec. 1864)

=== Militia veterans ===
Photos of some veterans of the Dundas Militia
Name	Notes	Photo
Richard Duncan Fraser	Lieutenant in the Dundas Militia and Captain of the Provincial Light Dragoons during the Battle of Crysler's Farm. Commanded the Grenville Militia at the Battle of the Windmill.	
John Hickey	Private in the 2nd Flank Company, Dundas Militia, who fought at the Battle of Ogdensburg	
John Van Camp	Private in the 1st Flank (Ault's) Company of the Dundas Militia and veteran of the War of 1812	
John Froats	Corporal in Lt. Crysler's Company of the Dundas Militia at the Battle of Crysler's Farm	
John Shaver	Private in the Dundas Militia and veteran of the Battle of Crysler's Farm wearing the Military General Service Medal	
Conrad Kintner	Private in the Dundas Militia and Captain Fraser's Provincial Dragoons, awarded the Military General Service Medal	
John Cook	Corporal in the Dundas Militia during the War of 1812 and Captain in the 3rd Battalion, Dundas Militia during the Upper Canada Rebellion	
Peter Shaver	Private in the Dundas Militia during the War of 1812, Captain of the Dundas Cavalry Troop from 1822 to 1840, and Lt-Col. of the 3rd Battalion, Dundas Militia, 1846-1856	
George W. Brouse	Private in the Dundas Militia during the War of 1812, Captain in the 2nd (Matilda) Battalion, Dundas Militia in 1850	
John Strader	Private in the 1st Flank (Ault's) Company of the Dundas Militia who fought in the War of 1812 and the Upper Canada Rebellion, awarded the Military General Service Medal	
John W. Loucks	Burned the Nash Creek Bridge to prevent the American advance through Dundas, fought at the Battle of Crysler's Farm as a private in Captain Fraser's Provincial Dragoons and as an ensign in Capt. Crysler's Company, 1st Dundas Regiment at the Battle of the Windmill. Promoted to lieutenant and captain in the militia in the 1840s-50s	
Warner Casselman	Private in Captain Doran's Company, 2nd Dundas Regiment, at the Battle of the Windmill	
William Errington	Private in Captain Chrysler's Company, 1st Dundas Regiment, wounded at the Battle of the Windmill	
Allan McIntosh	Private in Captain Shaver's Company, 2nd Dundas Regiment at the Battle of the Windmill	
Charles McIntosh	Private in Captain Doran's Company, 2nd Dundas Regiment at the Battle of the Windmill	
David McIntosh	Sergeant in Captain Doran's Company, 2nd Dundas Regiment at the Battle of the Windmill, Ensign in the 2nd (Matilda) Battalion in 1847	
John Adam Shaver	Sergeant in Capt. Crysler's Company, 1st Dundas Regiment at the Battle of the Windmill, Captain in the 4th (Winchester) Battalion	
Giles Winfield Bogart	Private in the Grenville Militia at the Battle of the Windmill, Ensign in the 3rd Battalion, Dundas Militia in 1847, Captain of a company of the Dundas Militia in 1869	
John Pliny Crysler	Captain in the Dundas Militia during the Upper Canada Rebellion and Commanding Officer of the 4th (Winchester) Battalion, Dundas Militia 1859-1860s	
John Van Allen	Private in Captain Robertson's Company, 2nd Dundas Regiment at Fort Wellington in November 1838	
Peter Droppo	Private in Captain Doran's Company, 2nd Dundas Regiment in 1839	
Pembroke G. Crysler	Lieutenant in the 1st (Williamsburg) Battalion, Dundas Militia in the 1840s-50s	
David Rae	Private in the Glengarry Militia during the Upper Canada Rebellion and Lieutenant in the 4th (Winchester) Battalion, Dundas Militia in 1863	
Isaac Newton Rose	Lieutenant in the Dundas Militia at the Battle of the Windmill, Captain of the Dundas Infantry Company from 1862 to 1865, and commanded a battalion of the Dundas Militia in 1869	
James Holden	Captain of the 1st Williamsburg (Dundas) Rifles, 1857-1864	
William S. Van Allen	Private in the 1st Williamsburg (Dundas) Rifles, 1857-1861, Private in the Morrisburg Garrison Artillery 1862	
Alexander Farlinger	Captain who raised the Morrisburg Volunteer Rifle Company during the Trent Affair, in 1862	
Thomas Stafford Rubidge	Captain who raised the Morrisburg Garrison Artillery during the Trent Affair in 1862, and commanded it in the Fenian Raids in 1866, awarded the Canada General Service Medal	
Joseph Sherbenaut	Corporal in the Morrisburg Garrison Artillery during the Fenian Raids of 1866, awarded the Canada General Service Medal	
Peter Bogart	Ensign in the 4th (Winchester) Battalion, Dundas Militia, 1863	
Robert Kyle	Ensign in the 4th (Winchester) Battalion, Dundas Militia, 1863	
Alexander Stallmire	Lieutenant in the 4th (Winchester) Battalion, Dundas Militia, 1863	
Henry W. Moad	Ensign in the 4th (Winchester) Battalion, Dundas Militia, 1863	
Almon Casselman	Gunner in the Morrisburg Garrison Artillery during the Fenian Raids of 1866, awarded the Canada General Service Medal	
John Henry McPhee	Gunner in the Morrisburg Garrison Artillery during the Fenian Raids of 1866, awarded the Canada General Service Medal	
William Millar	Sergeant in the Iroquois Garrison Artillery during the Fenian Raids of 1866 and 1870, awarded the Canada General Service Medal	
Theodore F. Chamberlain	Lieutenant in the Dundas Infantry Company during the Fenian Raids	
Joseph Hyndman	Captain in the Dundas Militia during the Fenian Raids, commanded a battalion in 1869	

== Battle honours ==
In the list below, the battle honours that were earned by the Dundas Militia, and perpetuated by the Stormont, Dundas and Glengarry Highlanders are shown.

=== War of 1812 ===
- Defence of Canada – 1812–1815
- Crysler's Farm

=== Rebellions of 1837-38 ===
- Windmill Point

=== Fenian Raids ===
- Defence of Canada – 1862–1865
- Fenian Raids 1866-70

== See also ==
- Dundas County, Ontario
- Canadian Militia
- Canadian units of the War of 1812
- Battle of Crysler's Farm
- Battle of the Windmill
