= Salmon River Raid =

1814 raid of the War of 1812

- Part of War of 1812
Date	February 14–24, 1814
Location	Salmon River and French Mills, New York, United States
Result	British victory

Belligerents
United Kingdom; Lower Canada, Upper Canada; Mohawk	United States

Commanders and leaders
Joseph Morrison; Hercules Scott; Francis Cockburn	Jacob Brown

Units involved
Canadian Fencibles; 89th Regiment of Foot; 103rd Regiment of Foot; 1st Dundas Militia; 1st Stormont Militia; Glengarry Militia; Mohawk Warriors	New York Militia; Brown's Brigade

Strength
1,200+	200+

Casualties and losses
70 deserters	No casualties Supplies captured

The Salmon River Raid was a raid conducted by British forces in February 1814 against the recently abandoned American bases along the Salmon River near French Mills, New York. A previous raid and battle at French Mills had been conducted in 1812.

== Background ==
The British forces, commanded by Lieutenant Colonel Joseph Morrison, had been anxious along the St. Lawrence front since the defeat of the Americans on November 11, and their abandonment of Cornwall on November 13. The American force under Gen. Jacob Brown had gone into winter quarters around Malone and French Mills on the Salmon River, but in early February 1814 began to retreat to Plattsburgh to rendezvous with the rest of James Wilkinson's Army.

The British force in the Cornwall area consisted of regulars from the Canadian Fencibles and the 89th and 103rd Regiments of Foot, as well as local militia and native warriors, and it waqs decided to launch a series of raids against the winter encampments in New York.

Earlier in February, Capt. Reuben Sherwood had launched a Raid on Madrid and successfully captured a wealth of American supplies, convincing Morrison that it was the right time to conduct a larger scale raid.

== Raid ==
On February 14, 1814, the small force of Regulars under Col. Hercules Scott captured some supplies from French Mills, but realized that there was much more to be taken with the retreat of Brown's American army. Thus on February 19, a large British force of over 1200 set out from Cornwall to raid along the Salmon River. Sleighs were impressed from Dundas and Stormont farms, and the British traversed the frozen St. Lawrence into New York.

A detachment of Militia was dispatched to Four Corners, while the main army under Scott and Morrison pulled into Malone during the evening of the 19th and proceeded to search the neighbourhood for arms and provisions left behind by Wilkinson's forces. The British remained for two days, during which some public buildings were destroyed, although there appears to have been a considerable degree of leniency shown to the local inhabitants. Capturing suitable supplies, they advanced to French Mills while the Militia at Four Corners had arrived early on the morning of the 20th, and soon discovered a large cache of provisions, amounting to 150 to 200 barrels of flour, beef, pork, and whiskey. Moreover, thirty-two civilian teamsters with their sleds and teams were arrested at the local tavern and impressed to haul the freight back to Canada. The militia and their captured prisoners then set out to rendezvous with the main column, burning the bridges behind them. Elements of the forced advanced as far as the Marble River to prevent a messenger from delivering news of the raid to Plattsburgh and Wilkinson's army there.

Col. Scott learned of large stores of flour at Hopkinton, and he delayed plans to leave French Mills until the flour there could be secured. This was done by another small detachment of regulars and militia. Unfortunately, they only had the means to transport half the flour and a small stand of muskets and thus a portion of the other 150 barrels were distributed to the townspeople, with the rest were destroyed.

Scott and Morrison returned to Cornwall on February 23 with the captured supplies reaching Summerstown at dusk, having lost only one sleigh with its team and cargo to the river when it broke through the ice. The sleighs delivered the cargo to the government storehouse at Cornwall on February 24.

== Aftermath ==
The raid was a great British success, denying the Americans vital supplies and weapons while bolstering the defence of the St. Lawrence front. The raid was the last military action along the St. Lawrence front in Upper Canada.

70 British soldiers deserted during the two expeditions, mostly from Col. Scott's 103rd Regiment of Foot.
