= Dundas (Province of Canada electoral district) =

Province of Canada electoral district

Dundas Canada West
Province of Canada electoral district

Defunct pre-Confederation electoral district
- Legislature: Legislative Assembly of the Province of Canada
- District created: 1841
- District abolished: 1867
- First contested: 1841
- Last contested: 1863

Dundas was an electoral district of the Legislative Assembly of the Parliament of the Province of Canada, in Canada West, on the north shore of the Saint Lawrence River east of Lake Ontario. It was created in 1841, upon the establishment of the Province of Canada by the union of Upper Canada and Lower Canada.

Dundas was represented by one member in the Legislative Assembly. It was abolished in 1867, upon the creation of Canada and the province of Ontario.

== Boundaries ==
Dundas electoral district was located in Canada West (now the province of Ontario on the north shore of the Saint Lawrence River, east of Lake Ontario. It was midway between Kingston and Montreal, and close to the boundary with Canada East (now the province of Quebec). It was based on the boundaries of Dundas County.

The Union Act, 1840 had merged the two provinces of Upper Canada and Lower Canada into the Province of Canada, with a single Parliament. The separate parliaments of Lower Canada and Upper Canada were abolished. The Union Act provided that the pre-existing electoral boundaries of Upper Canada would continue to be used in the new Parliament, unless altered by the Union Act itself.

Dundas County had been an electoral district in the Legislative Assembly of Upper Canada, and its boundaries were not altered by the Act. Those boundaries had initially been set by a proclamation of the first Lieutenant Governor of Upper Canada, John Graves Simcoe, in 1792:

That the third of the said counties be hereafter called by the name of the county of Dundas; which county is to be bounded on the east by the westernmost boundary line of the county of Stormont, on the south by the river St. Lawrence, and on the west by the easternmost boundary line of the late township of Edwardsburgh, running north twenty-four degrees west until it intersects the Ottawa or Grand river, thence descending the said river until it meets the northwesternmost boundary of the county of Stormont. The said county of Dundas is to comprehend all the islands in the said river St. Lawrence nearest to the said county, in the whole or greater part fronting the same.

The county was subsequently defined by a statute of Upper Canada in 1798:

That the townships of Williamsburg, Matilda, Mountain, and Winchester, with such of the islands in the river Saint Lawrence as are wholly or in greater part opposite thereto, do together constitute and form the county of Dundas.

Since the Union Act did not change the boundaries of Dundas, the new electoral district continued to use those boundaries.

== Members of the Legislative Assembly ==
Dundas had one member in the Legislative Assembly. The following are the representatives from 1841 to 1866:

Assembly	Years	Member	Party
1st	1841-1844	John Cook	Reformer
2nd	1844-1847	George Greenfield Macdonell	Conservative
3rd	1848-1851	John Pliny Crysler	Conservative
4th	1851-1854	Jesse W. Rose	Liberal
5th	1854-1857	John Pliny Crysler	Conservative
6th	1858-1861	James William Cook	Reformer
7th	1861-1863	John Sylvester Ross	Conservative
8th	1863-1866	John Sylvester Ross	Conservative

== Abolition ==
The district was abolished on July 1, 1867, when the British North America Act, 1867 came into force, creating Canada and splitting the Province of Canada into Quebec and Ontario. It was succeeded by electoral districts of the same name in the House of Commons of Canada and the Legislative Assembly of Ontario.
