= Battle of Point Iroquois =

- Part of War of 1812
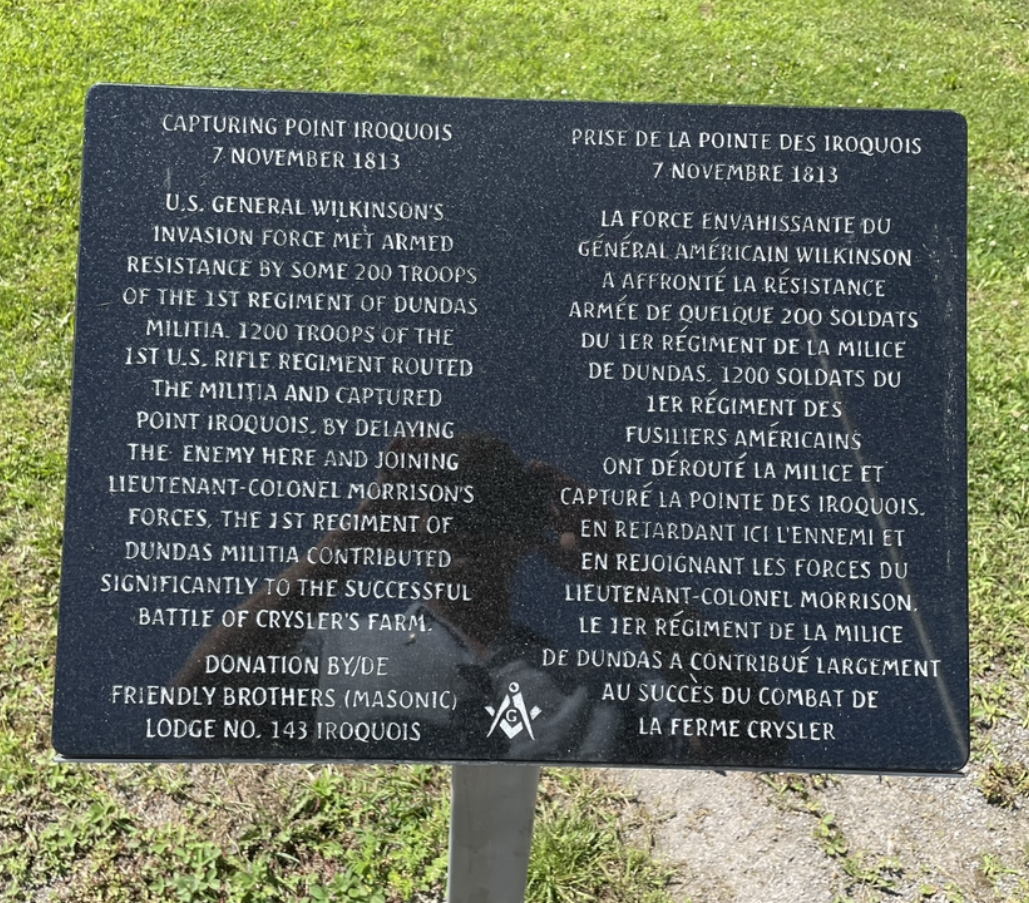
- Plaque (with erroneous date) commemorating the battle at the Iroquois locks
Date	November 8, 1813
Location	Point Iroquois, Dundas County, Upper Canada
Result	American victory

Belligerents
United Kingdom; Upper Canada	United States

Commanders and leaders
Capt. Michael Carman III; Capt. Monroe; Capt. George Merkley; Capt. Jacob Van Allen	Col. Alexander Macomb; Col. Winfield Scott; Maj. Benjamin Forsyth

Units involved
1st Regiment of Dundas Militia; Royal Artillery	3rd U.S. Artillery; 20th U.S. Infantry; 1st U.S. Rifles; Albany Volunteers

Strength
200	1,200

Casualties and losses
Several wounded and captured	Some wounded and killed

The Battle of Point Iroquois was a small skirmish fought on the morning of November 8, 1813, as part of Wilkinson's advance up the St. Lawrence towards Montreal. The skirmish occurred on the shores of the St. Lawrence River at Point Iroquois, Dundas County, where the river reached its narrowest point, only 500 yards across.

== St. Lawrence Campaign ==
Gen. James Wilkinson's campaign up the St. Lawrence was part of a combined attack on Montreal, in conjunction with Gen. Hampton's advance through Quebec. Wilkinson was to advance up the river capturing Cornwall and then moving on to join Hampton to take Montreal. His force left their base at Sackett's Harbour in September, and by the end of October was planning his advance along the Canadian shore.

=== Duncan Clark's Ride ===
On November 5, as Wilkinson's force began their movements on the river, Lt. Duncan Clark of the Incorporated Militia, formerly an Ensign in Capt. Ault's Flank Company of the 1st Dundas Regiment, was on duty on the shoreline and under orders to raise the alarm upon any American movements. Seeing the mass of boats moving down the river, Lieutenant Clark commandeered a sturdy plough horse from a nearby farm and rode the length of the front from Elizabethtown to Prescott alerting the local militia and civilians with the cry "The enemy is at hand!". His ride along the front was likened to the ride of Paul Revere in 1775, and Duncan Clark has since been heralded as the "Canadian Paul Revere".

On November 6, while at the settlement of Hoags, Wilkinson received the news that Gen. Hampton had been repulsed at the Chateauguay River on October 26. He sent fresh instructions to Hampton to march westward from his present position at Four Corners, New York and rendezvous at Cornwall.

Wilkinson's force successfully bypassed the British post at Prescott late on November 7. The troops and ammunition were disembarked and marched around Ogdensburg on the south bank of the river, while the lightened boats ran past the British batteries under cover of darkness and poor visibility. Only one boat was lost, with two killed and three wounded.

Early on the morning of November 8, Wilkinson ordered Macomb to take his brigade to the Canadian side of the river and march eastwards as an advance party for the main American force.

== Battle ==
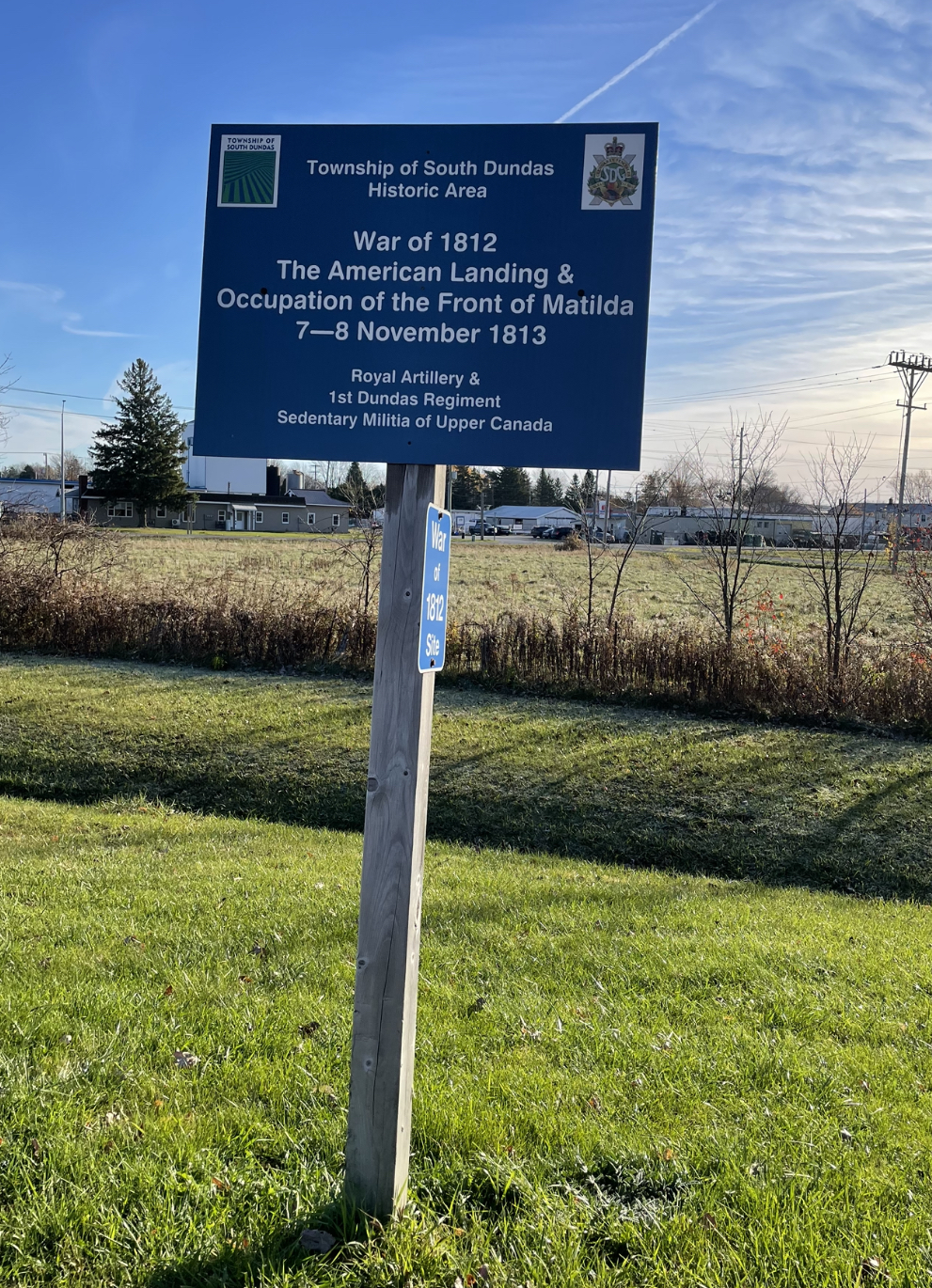
Sign commemorating the American landing and occupation of Matilda and Point Iroquois, 1813

All along the St. Lawrence front the local militia had been alert and keenly waited for the advancing American army. As Point Iroquois was the narrowest section of the river it was a likely spot for any crossing by American troops, and since the winter of 1812 the Dundas Militia had been building breastworks on the heights to command the area. The fortified position was known as Fort Matilda, Fort Iroquois, or according to an 1813 map; Fort Provost and before any advance up the river or shore could be made, the Americans needed to capture the breastworks. Piquets from the 1st Dundas Militia were on guard all along the shoreline and at the point, and as Macomb's Brigade landed on the Canadian shore the alarm was raised.

Pte. Peter Brouse and Pte. Jacob Brouse, brothers of George Brouse, were the first to sight and fire upon the American army as they landed on the shores of Dundas County. The Americans were at first thrown into confusion, but men from Col. Rudolph's 20th Infantry advanced from the shoreline into the wooded area around the breastworks, forcing back the scattered militia piquets, as Scott's artillery and Forsyth's riflemen came ashore. All companies of the Dundas Militia were hastily called out and approximately 200 militiamen gathered under Captains Monroe and Carman in a hollow on the point to resist the American army, along with a small detachment from the Royal Artillery.

The Dundas Militia fired a volley on the 20th Infantry and 1st U.S. Rifles as they advanced towards the breastworks, and a sharp firefight broke out with the American forces. Outnumbered and outgunned by the accuracy of the riflemen, the Militia quickly retired from their positions at Point Iroquois and Fort Matilda and retreated eastwards to Mariatown.

== Aftermath ==
Some members of the Dundas Militia were wounded, and the Americans suffered some killed and wounded but no definitive casualty count exists.

The Americans captured the Point and destroyed the breastworks of Fort Matilda, encamping below the village of Iroquois for the night before continuing their advance through Dundas towards Cornwall, but the delaying action fought by the Dundas Militia gave Morrison vital time in gathering and preparing his forces to attack the Americans. Macomb's Brigade would be joined by the rest of Wilkinson's Army and Gen. Boyd's brigades and would be decisively defeated by the British/Canadian forces at Crysler's Farm three days later.

An American detachment of dragoons would be defeated by the Dundas and Glengarry Militias at the Skirmish at Doran's Farm on the night of November 8/9, not far from Point Iroquois.

The determination and loyalty of the local militias during the series of battles and skirmishes in November 1813 was noted by General Wilkinson who wrote from his headquarters on the Salmon River on November 16:

"The enemy deserve great credit for their zeal and intelligence, which, with the active universal hostility of the male inhabitants of the country, enabled them to employ to the greatest advantage."

=== Legacy ===
A 1977 CBC TV film called the Ambush at Iroquois Point was loosely based on the battle and events of the American invasion of Dundas in 1813. R. H. Thomson stars as Edward Casselman, a conflicted Dundas Militiaman and son of Dundas Militia captain John Casselman, played by Ken Pogue.
