= Merkley =

Merkley may refer to:

- Henry Merkley (1758–1840), an Upper Canada politician
- Jeff Merkley (b. 1956), a United States senator
- John Alexander Merkley (1877–1944), a Saskatchewan politician
- Larry Merkley (b. 1943), a Canadian Curler
- Nick Merkley (b. 1997), a Canadian ice-hockey player
- Ryan Merkley (businessman), Canadian-born business and non-profit executive
- Ryan Merkley (ice hockey) (b. 2000), a Canadian ice-hockey player
- 22132 Merkley, an asteroid
