= George Macdonell =

George Macdonell may refer to:

- George Macdonell (British Army officer), British Army officer in the War of 1812
- George Greenfield Macdonell, politician in Upper Canada
- George Alcock MacDonnell, Anglican clergyman and chess player
- George Hugh Macdonell, contractor and political figure in Ontario, Canada
