= Jacob Weager =

Loyalist soldier and Upper Canada politician

MLA for Dundas
- In office 1800–1804
- Preceded by: Thomas Fraser
- Succeeded by: John Crysler

Personal details
- Born: 26 September 1755 Rhinebeck, Dutchess County, Province of New York (Thirteen Colonies)
- Died: 10 July 1827 (aged 71) Dundas County, Upper Canada
- Occupation: Soldier

Military service
- Allegiance: Great Britain; Upper Canada
- Branch/service: British Army; Canadian militia
- Years of service: 1777 - 1784; 1800 - 1814
- Rank: Sergeant; Lieutenant; Captain
- Unit: King's Royal Regiment of New York; Dundas County Militia
- Battles/wars: American Revolution: Northern New York Campaign; War of 1812: Battle of Ogdensburg; Battle of Crysler's Farm

Jacob Weager (September 26, 1755 - July 10, 1827) was a farmer and political figure in Upper Canada. He represented Dundas in the Legislative Assembly of Upper Canada from 1800 to 1804.

Jacob Weager, was a British Army Captain and Upper Canadian politician. He was born in the Rhinebeck, Dutchess County, Province of New York, the son of Everhart Weager and married to Mary Hare in 1784. He served in the King's Loyal Regiment of New York during the American Revolution. Weager married Mary Hare, the daughter of Henry Hare of the Indian Department. He lived in Williamsburgh Township. Weager served in the Dundas County Militia, reaching the rank of captain, and was a justice of the peace in the Eastern District.

Weager died in Dundas in 1827.
