= Assault on Ogdensburg =

1812 Canadian militia attack on the American defences

- Part of War of 1812
Date	October 4, 1812
Location	Ogdensburg, New York, United States
Result	American victory

Belligerents
United Kingdom; Upper Canada	United States

Commanders and leaders
Col. Robert Lethbridge; Capt. Reuben Sherwood	General Jacob Brown Major Benjamin Forsyth; Joseph York; Lt. Church

Units involved
Glengarry Light Infantry; 1st Leeds Militia; 1st Dundas Militia; 1st Stormont Militia	1st U.S. Rifles; Ogdensburg Volunteers; New York Militia

Strength
700+	500+

Casualties and losses
3 killed 10+ wounded	None

The Assault on Ogdensburg, also known as the First Battle of Ogdensburg or the Battle of Prescott, was an attack by Canadian militia on the American defences at Ogdensburg on October 4, 1812.

== Background ==
With the outbreak of the War of 1812, commerce between New York and Upper Canada along the St. Lawrence River continued regularly, and besides the Battle of Matilda, there had been little military action.

On September 21, 1812, American riflemen conducted the Raid on Gananoque, plundering the town before returning to New York. This raid enraged the British commander at Prescott, Colonel Robert Lethbridge. Lethbridge pled with General George Prevost to launch a retaliatory raid on the strategic town of Ogdensburg, but Prevost forbade any offensive actions along the river.

== Assault ==
Col. Lethbridge finally decided to go against the orders from Prevost and launch an assault against the Americans in October. He gathered a force of 150 Glengarry Light Infantry and approximately 600 militia from Dundas, Leeds, and Stormont and planned to cross the river and amphibiously take the town.

Early on the morning of October 4, the guns at Fort Wellington in Prescott opened up a cannonade against the Fort in Ogdensburg. Under the bombardment, Lethbridge took his force and put into the river with 25 bateaux and 2 gun boats.

The American defences were commanded by General Jacob Brown and Sheriff Joseph York, and consisted of the 1st Rifle Regiment, New York Militia, and the Ogdensburg Volunteers. The Fort also had an iron 12-pounder cannon and a brass 6-pounder cannon, commanded by Sheriff York and Lt. Church.

When Lethbridge and the Canadian boats crossed the middle of the river, the Americans opened fire with their cannons and muskets, and after a sharp exchange, forced the Canadians to turn back and return to Prescott under heavy fire.

== Aftermath ==
3 Canadians were killed in the assault, including Private Mott of the 1st Leeds Militia, and over 10 were wounded.

John Kilborn of the Leeds Militia was present during the assault, and recounted in later years:

Assistance from the Brockville men was asked for, and with about forty others, I volunteered and marched to Prescott during the night, under the command of Reuben Sherwood and Lieutenant William Morris. Boats were made ready, and, early in the morning, led by Colonel Lethbridge, with part of a company of regulars, the attack was made. The boat I was in was commanded by William Morris. After getting near the batteries (which they plied constantly), and in front of the town [Ogdensburg], we failed to effect a landing and returned to Prescott. The loss in our boat was one killed and eight wounded.

For disobeying orders and failing to achieve a victory, Col. Lethbridge was stripped of his command by General Prevost and assigned to a desk job in Montreal, and command of Prescott was turned over to Colonel Thomas Pearson.

Tensions remained high along the St. Lawrence, and the Forsyth's rifleman once again raided along the river in February, raiding Elizabethtown. In response to this raid, Pearson ordered another attack on Ogdensburg, resulting in the Battle of Ogdensburg.
