= John McIntosh (farmer) =

Canadian farmer

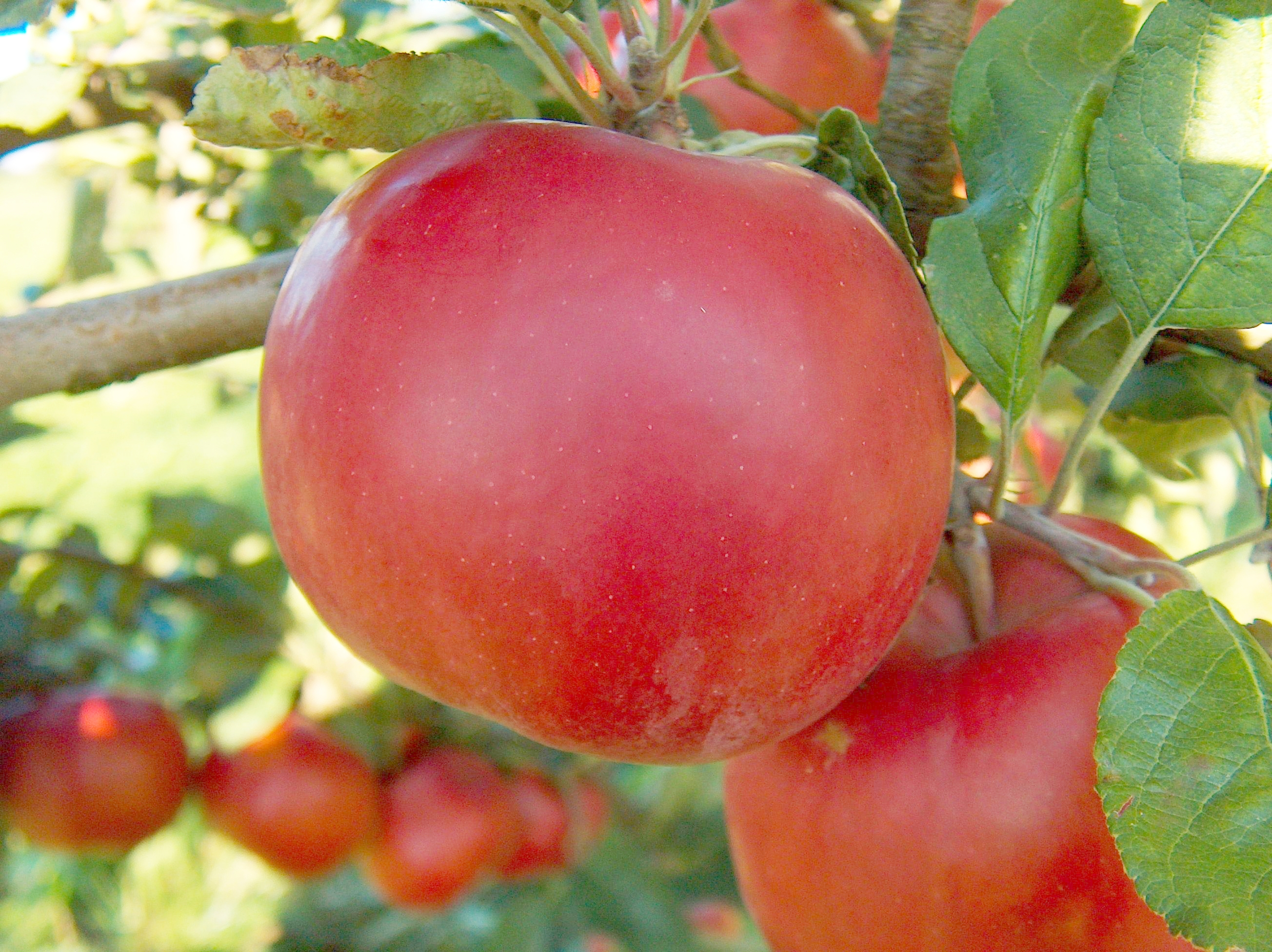
"McIntosh" on a tree

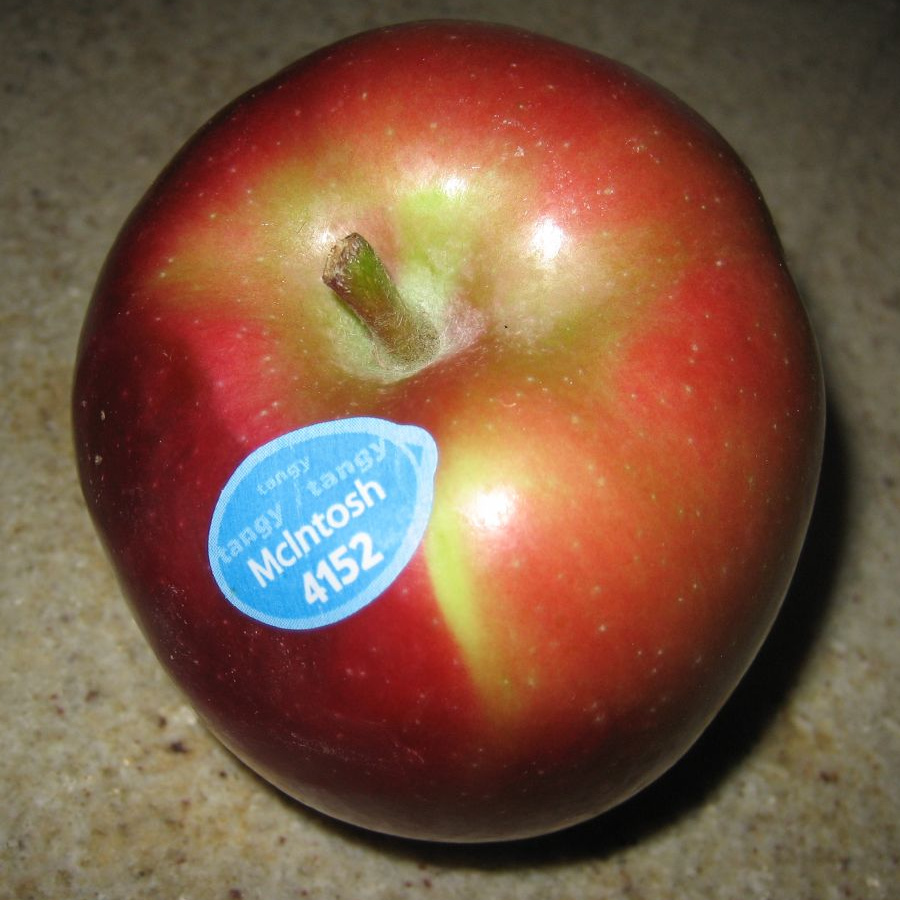
McIntosh Red apple as bought

John McIntosh (August 15, 1777 – c. 1845) was a Scottish-Canadian farmer and fruit breeder, credited with discovering the McIntosh Red apple. Through the apple, his surname is the eponym of the Macintosh (or Mac) computers and operating systems by Apple Inc.

== Early life ==
John McIntosh was born in Mohawk Valley near Harpersfield in the Province of New York in 1777, the son of Alexander McIntosh and Janet Mutrie, Scottish immigrants, loyalist during the American Revolution. McIntosh emigrated to Upper Canada sometime between 1795 and 1801 and settled in Matilda Township, now part of South Dundas Township. He married Hannah Doran on 19 April 1801, in South Dundas, Stormont Dundas and Glengarry, Ontario, Canada. They were the parents of at least 7 sons and 6 daughters. His four sons, David, Charles, Allan, and John served with the Dundas County Militia during the Upper Canada Rebellion, fighting at the Battle of the Windmill in 1838. His son Allan would continue growing the apples and expanded the orchards.

== Discovery of the McIntosh apple ==
While clearing his property, McIntosh discovered a number of seedling apple trees growing wild. He transplanted them to his garden, and by the following year only one had survived. Several years later, the tree was producing the crisp, delicious fruit that is now well known. The discoverer eventually dubbed it the 'McIntosh Red', which is still the apple's official name.

McIntosh farmed the original property until his death, sometime between September 19, 1845, and January 10, 1846, near St. Lawrence Valley, Ontario.

== Original tree ==
The original tree that spawned this legacy was damaged by fire in 1894. The McIntosh family nursed the old tree along until 1908; the last year it produced a crop; and, in 1910, it fell over. A flat headstone now marks the spot where the stump had remained for years. At least three plaques commemorating the site's historic value are also located in the vicinity. In 1962, the Ontario Heritage Foundation erected a plaque outside the former McIntosh homestead.

In 2001 the Historic Sites and Monuments Board of Canada unveiled another plaque in a nearby park and declared the apple's discovery and development an "event of national historic importance." The park, which belongs to the Township of South Dundas, also features a large hand-painted mural depicting the apple's history.
