= Surrender of French Mills =

- Part of War of 1812
Date	22 November 1812
Location	French Mills New York
Result	British victory

Belligerents
United Kingdom; Upper Canada	United States

Commanders and leaders
Lt. Col. Alex McMillan	Unknown

Strength
150	50

Casualties and losses
None	50 captured

The Battle of French Mills or First Salmon River Raid was a raid and battle fought on November 22, 1812. 100 American soldiers stationed at French Mills led a successful attack against 45 Canadian voyageurs on 23 October at the Battle of St. Regis. Half returned to French Mills while the other half departed for Plattsburgh, New York. In retribution, a mix of Canadian regulars and militia amounting to 150 men attacked the 50 Americans at French Mills forcing their surrender.

== Background ==
In early July 1812, the American soldiers began constructing a blockhouse at French Mills on the St. Lawrence River. The 100 Americans at French Mills, commanded by Major Guilford Dudley Young, launched an attack against 45 Canadian Voyageurs camped outside the village of St. Regis. Their purpose was to watch for American attacks as well as provide confidence to the Mohawks at St. Regis. The attack was a success killing 5 while capturing the remaining 40 at the Battle of St. Regis. After the battle 50 of the Americans departed for Plattsburgh New York while the other 50 returned to French Mills.

== Action ==
A month after the attack on St. Regis a company of Glengarry Light Infantry Fencibles, Stormont militia, Dundas Militia, and Glengarry Militia numbering 150 left Cornwall, Ontario for French Mills. They were under command of Lt. Col. Alex McMillan of the Glengarry Militia. In the middle of the night, they approached the Americans. The Americans, seeing they were heavily outnumbered, retreated to the blockhouse. They didn't fire their weapons allowing the Canadians to entirely surround them. Seeing the hopelessness of the situation the Americans surrendered.

== Aftermath ==
The Canadians looted 4 river boats and 57 muskets. All the muskets were broken in half and thrown into the St. Lawrence River. The American prisoners were escorted by the Glengarry company to Fort Coteau-du-Lac and from there to Montreal. They were released in an exchange for York Militiamen who had been captured by Americans.

== Sources ==
- Hannings, Bud (2012). The War of 1812: A Complete Chronology with biographies of 63 General Officers. McFarland and Company Inc. ISBN 9780786463855.
- Pudwell, Jesse (August 2009). "The Battle of French Mills". Glengarry Light Infantry Fencibles.
