= Rolland Macdonald =

Rolland Macdonald (March 1810 – 1881) was a lawyer, judge and political figure in Canada West. He represented Cornwall in the Legislative Assembly of the Province of Canada from 1844 to 1846.

He was born in Fort William, the son of John MacDonald of Garth and his half-Indian country wife, Nancy Small. He was educated in Montreal. Macdonald was called to the bar in 1832 and set up practice in Saint Catharines in partnership with George Greenfield Macdonell.

He was an unsuccessful candidate for the Cornwall seat in the assembly in 1841. Macdonald resigned his seat in 1846 to allow John Hillyard Cameron to run for a seat in the assembly. In 1856, he was named Queen's Counsel. Macdonald served as Clerk of the Peace and County Crown Attorney for Lincoln. He was a captain in the local militia during the Upper Canada Rebellion, later reaching the rank of lieutenant-colonel. In 1873, Macdonald was named judge in the court for Welland County.
