= James William Cook =

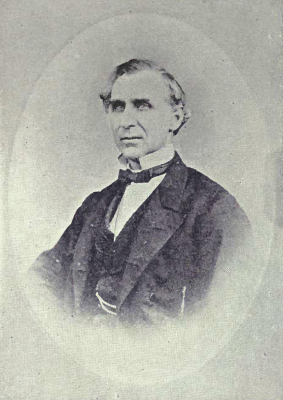

Member of the Legislative Assembly for Dundas
- In office 1857–1861
- Preceded by: Unknown
- Succeeded by: Unknown

Personal details
- Born: January 11, 1820 Williamsburgh Township, Upper Canada
- Died: May 21, 1875 (aged 55) Morrisburg, Canada West
- Children: Ella Cook
- Relatives: John Cook (uncle); Hermon Henry Cook (brother); Simon Cook (brother)
- Occupation: Lumber merchant, politician

James William Cook (January 11, 1820 – May 21, 1875) was a lumber merchant and political figure in Canada West.

He was born in Williamsburgh Township in Upper Canada in 1820. His family operated a timber business along the South Nation and Castor Rivers in the eastern part of the province. The firm's main office was in Morrisburg. The business expanded to include operations near Quebec City, Toronto and Barrie. In 1857, he was elected to the 6th Parliament of the Province of Canada representing Dundas.

His uncle John Cook had earlier represented Dundas in the Legislative Assembly. His brother Hermon Henry served in the federal and provincial legislatures and his brother Simon served in the Legislative Assembly of Ontario.

Both his father George and uncle John, had served in the Dundas Militia during the War of 1812, receiving the Military General Service Medal with clasp for Crysler's Farm.

He died at Morrisburg in 1875.

His daughter Ella later married Joseph Philippe Baby Casgrain, a land surveyor and politician from Quebec.
