= Raid on Madrid =

1814 raid of the War of 1812

- Part of War of 1812
Date	February 6, 1814
Location	Madrid, New York, United States
Result	Canadian victory

Belligerents
United Kingdom; Upper Canada	United States

Commanders and leaders
Capt. Reuben Sherwood	Unknown

Units involved
Royal Marines; Incorporated Militia of Upper Canada; 1st Dundas Militia	South Madrid Militia

Strength
50+	100+

Casualties and losses
No casualties	No casualties Supplies captured

The Raid on Madrid was a small raid by Canadian Militia and Royal Marines on the village of Madrid, New York, during the War of 1812.

== Background ==
With the withdrawal of Wilkinson's Army from their winter quarters along the Salmon River, the British and Canadians believed it was a good time to launch a raid and attempt to capture any supplies that had been abandoned in the American retreat.

Capt. Reuben Sherwood of the 1st Leeds Militia formulated a plan to raid the village of Madrid for any vital supplies.

== Raid ==
Late in the evening on February 6, 1814, Sherwood took a force of 23 Royal Marines, 11 members of the Incorporated Militia of Upper Canada, and 20 men from the Dundas Militia and crossed the St. Lawrence River in boats manned by the Dundas men. They marched through Hamilton and then turned and marched 14 miles to Madrid, arriving late that night. There they recovered property belonging to Kingston merchants which had been seized when their seven bateaux were captured near Cornwall in late October by privateers from Hamilton.

Sherwood and his men commandeered as many sleighs as possible from the area and loaded them full with supplies and stores from Madrid. They began their return to the river on the morning of February 7, and crossed back over that afternoon in boats once again manned by men of the Dundas Militia.

== Aftermath ==
The raid was successful, though 20 sleigh loads had to be left behind due to lack of space in the boats. The supplies were taken to Cornwall and Gen. Morrison was convinced to launch a larger scale raid in the area, resulting in the Salmon River Raid later that month.
