= Skirmish at Doran's Farm =

- Part of War of 1812
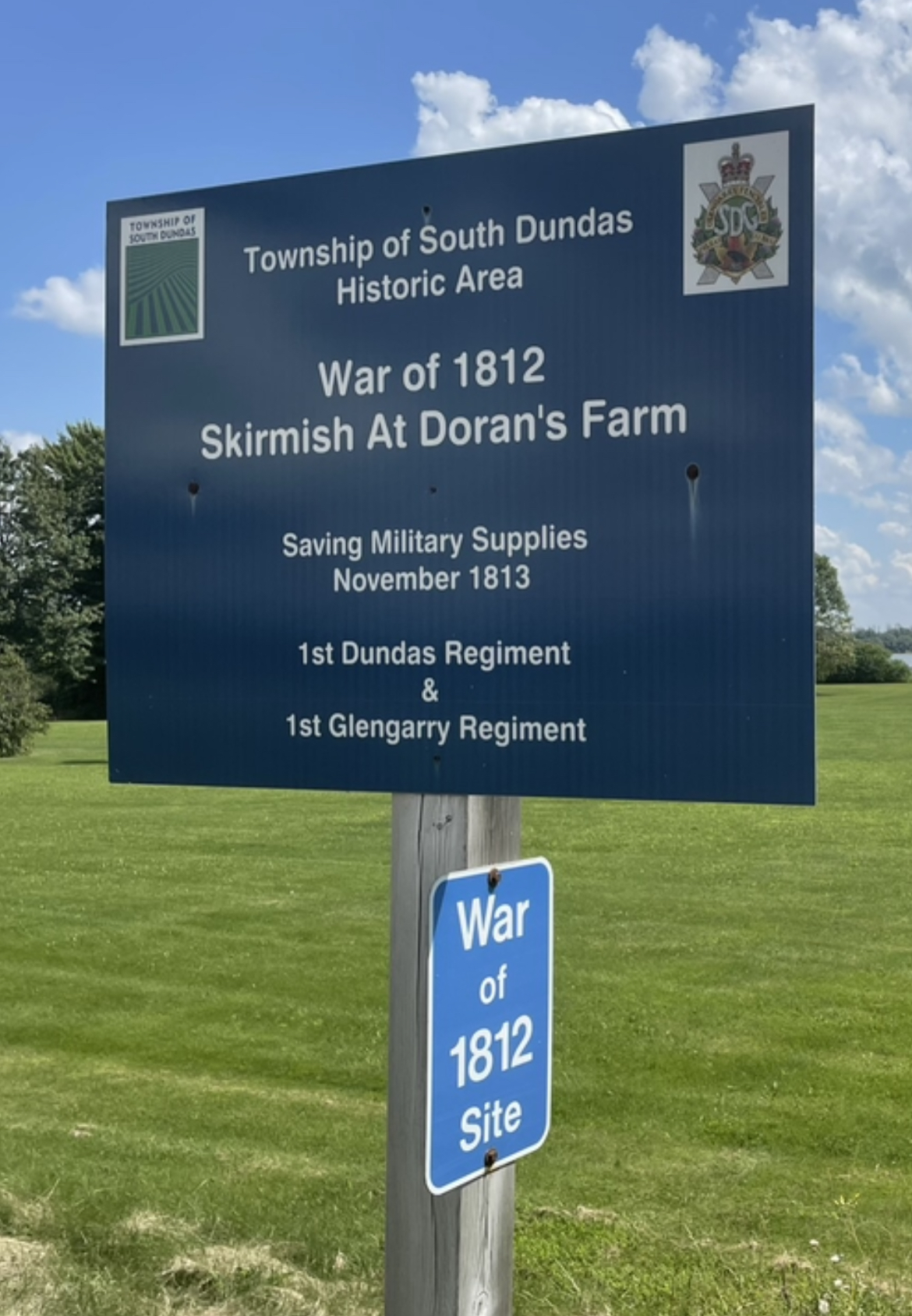
- Commemorative sign at Doran's Farm, the site of the skirmish
Date	November 8–9, 1813
Location	Iroquois, Dundas County, Upper Canada
Result	British victory

Belligerents
United Kingdom; Upper Canada	United States

Commanders and leaders
Capt. George Merkley; Capt. Alex McMillan	Maj. John Woodford

Units involved
1st Regiment of Dundas Militia; 2nd Regiment of Glengarry Militia	2nd U.S. Light Dragoons

Strength
200	250+

Casualties and losses
No casualties	11 killed and wounded several taken prisoner

The Skirmish at Doran's Farm was a small skirmish during the War of 1812 fought during Wilkinson's advance up the St. Lawrence.

== Background ==
After defeating the force of Dundas Militia at the Battle of Point Iroquois on the morning of November 8th, the bulk of Wilkinson's army crossed the St. Lawrence and landed in Dundas County. Advance parties were dispatched eastwards as far as Mariatown to scout for British and Canadian forces.

At the same time, a line of British supply boats under military escort set out from Montreal to ascend the St. Lawrence River and bring much needed supplies to the forces at Prescott. An American force posted on Ogden's Island noticed the approaching convoy and decided to capture the supplies. Suspecting danger, the British force brought their boats to a halt and the supplies destined for Prescott were landed just above Mariatown where the services of the farmers in the vicinity were secured and around 10 pm the stores were all placed in wagons, by which manner they were to be taken to Prescott, while the boats were to return to Cornwall.

== Skirmish ==
As the wagons were being loaded, a militia scout arrived and reported the presence of a force of approximately 250 dismounted American dragoons. The loaded wagons were removed some distance from the river where they delayed for a time before proceeding to Prescott. Instructions were given to those in charge of the boats to drop down the river as far as Hoople's Creek.

Around 11 pm, a force of two companies from the 1st Dundas Militia under Capt. George Merkley and the 2nd Glengarry Militia under Capt. Alexander McMillan, already worn out with fatigue, started marching west from Mariatown to meet the enemy. The militiamen spotted the advancing American forces at the Doran family farm near Iroquois and at once concealed themselves in the wood lines near a creek. As the Americans drew near and marched across the field, the militia opened up a steady fire, killing and wounding 11.

James Croil in his history of Dundas recalled the events of the skirmish:

The night was cold, and the roads in a fearful state of mud, while the moon shone fitfully through the lowering clouds, at times lighting up their [Dundas and Glengarry Militias] path, and anon leaving them in darkness. When near Doran's, a glimpse of moonlight disclosed to them a formidable party approaching, recognized to be the enemy by their white trousers and the tuft of white horsehair which surmounted their brass helmets. Placing themselves in ambush, they allowed them to come within pistol shot, when they opened a well-directed fire upon them. Unable to see their foe, the invaders were seized with a sudden panic and retired with the loss of eleven killed and wounded, and several prisoners.

== Aftermath ==
The dragoons were disorganized and surprised and were forced to retreat back towards the main army at Point Iroquois. Besides the 11 killed and wounded, several American dragoons were taken prisoner by the militia who marched back to Mariatown at dawn on November 9th.

=== Burning of the Nash Creek Bridge ===
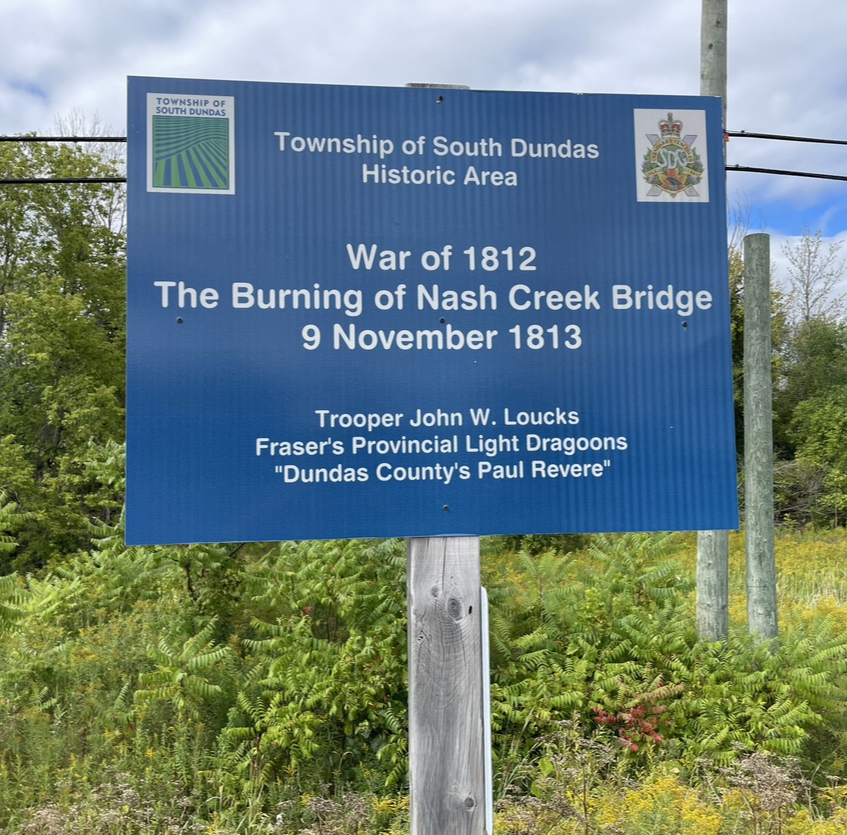
Sign commemorating the burning of the Nash Creek Bridge in Morrisburg

The small skirmish did not deter Wilkinson from advancing towards Cornwall on the 9th, and by late afternoon his army had marched through Matilda and Williamsburg townships. As the American forces pushed east through Williamsburg township, Trooper John W. Loucks of Fraser's Provincial Light Dragoons, formerly of the 1st Dundas Regiment, was on duty at the bridge over Nash Creek. When the advance parties of the American army came into view, Trooper Loucks set fire to the Nash Creek Bridge to prevent their advance and to signal the position of the enemy. He then rode east to alert the Dundas and Stormont Milita before riding north and west around the American force to contact the British forces coming from Kingston under Gen. Morrison.
