= Battle of Matilda =

Early military engagement of the War of 1812

- Part of War of 1812
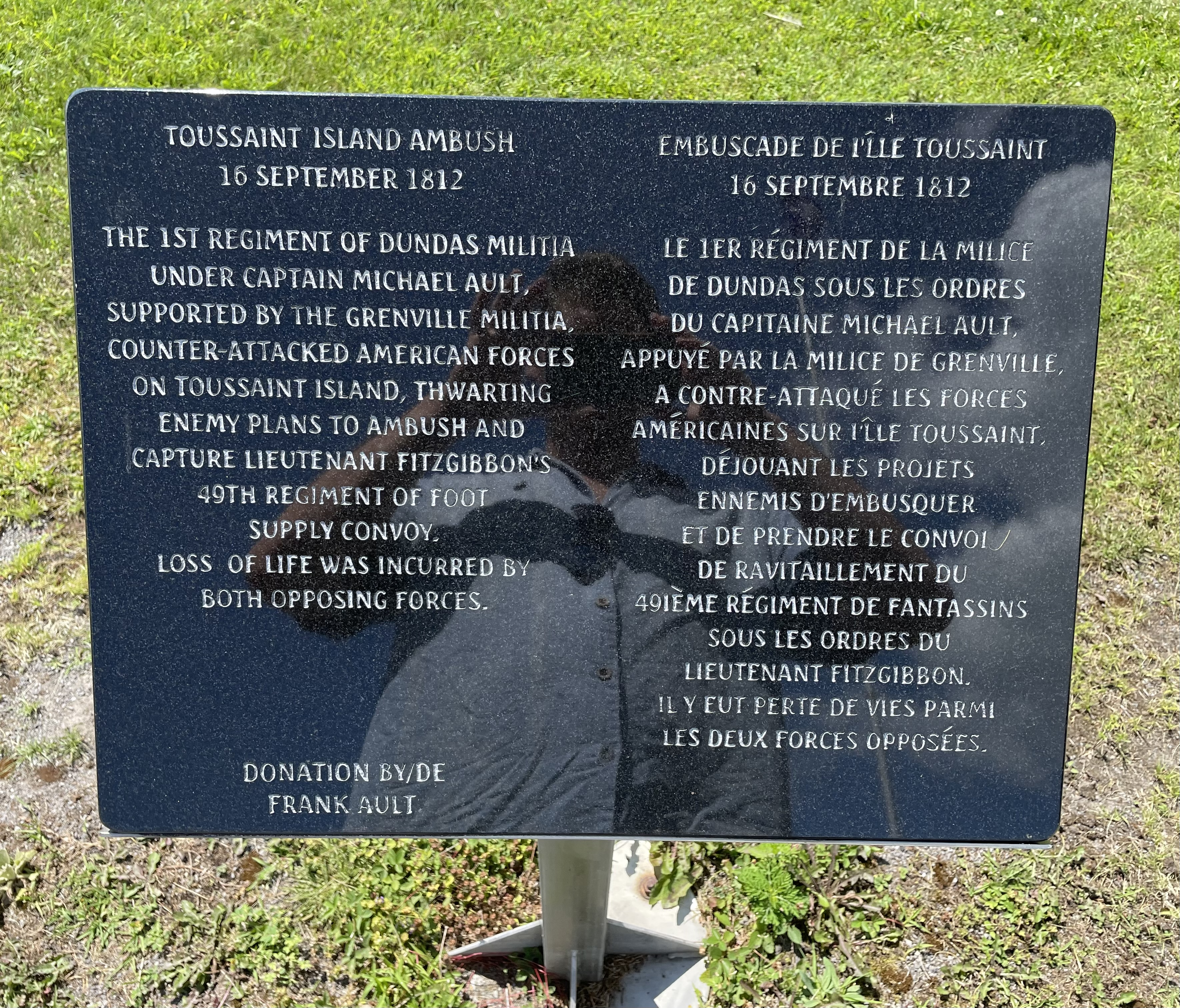
- Plaque commemorating the Battle of Matilda (Toussaint's Island)
Date	September 16, 1812
Location	Matilda, Dundas County, Upper Canada
Result	British victory

Belligerents
United Kingdom; Upper Canada	United States

Commanders and leaders
Maj. Rowland Heathcote; Col. Allan MacDonell; Capt. Michael Ault	Capt. Griffin; Lt. Church

Units involved
Royal Newfoundland Fencibles; 1st Dundas Militia; 1st Grenville Militia	New York Militia; 1 Gun boat

Strength
200+	500+

Casualties and losses
1 killed several wounded	Some wounded and killed

The Battle of Matilda, also known as the Battle of Toussaint's Island, was an early skirmish of the War of 1812 fought on September 16, 1812 between American and Canadian militia in the St. Lawrence River near the township of Matilda, in Dundas County.

== Background ==
With the outbreak of the War of 1812 in June, the county militias along the St. Lawrence River began to muster and assemble for active service. Men of the Dundas Militia and Grenville Militia guarded the shoreline from Prescott to the Long Sault rapids, and closely monitored any movement on the New York shore. The militia also assisted supply convoys, providing protection for the boats travelling from Cornwall to Kingston.

The New York militia began to muster and likewise served duty along the banks of the river, and began to plan raids across the river.

== Battle ==
On September 16, 1812, soldiers from the 1st Flank Company of the 1st Dundas Regiment under Capt. Michael Ault and Ens. Duncan Clark, as well as soldiers under Maj. Rowland Heathcote from the Royal Newfoundland Regiment, were escorting a shipment of supplies from Montreal to Kingston when they were attacked in the St. Lawrence River near Matilda by 500 American Militia, under the command of Capt. Griffin, who were hiding on Toussaint Island.

A company of the Dundas Militia under Ens. Clark landed on Presqu'ile Island just as an American force landed on the same island and a sharp exchange of fire occurred. The Americans were pinned down by accurate fire from the Dundas men, concealed amongst the bushes and trees, and they were forced to retreat back to Toussaint's Island. During their hasty retreat, one of the American boats drifted away from their force and was captured by the Dundas militia. The boat contained 7 muskets, 2 swords, and a number of necessary provisions.

Soon, drawn to the noise of battle, more Dundas militiamen arrived on Presqu'ile to bolster the Canadian positions in case of a second invasion. Col. Allan MacDonell in command of the Dundas Militia, along with Capt. Shaver and Capt. Ault were joined by two companies of Grenville Militia under Capts. Monroe and Dulmage and Lt. Richard Duncan Fraser who brought along a 9-pounder artillery piece from Prescott that had originally been captured during the Battle of the Thousand Islands. After a few rounds of fire from the cannon and muskets, the Americans abandoned the island and retreated across the St. Lawrence River to the New York side.

== Order of battle ==
British forces

- 1st Regiment of Dundas Militia – Col. Allan MacDonell
  - 1st Flank Company – Capt. Michael Ault, Ens. Duncan Clark
  - Sedentary Company – Capt. Adam Shaver
  - Sedentary Company – Capt. John Munro
- 1st Regiment of Grenville Militia
  - 1st Flank Company – Capt. Hugh Monroe (Munro)
  - 2nd Flank Company – Capt. Philip Dulmadge
- 2nd Regiment of Grenville Militia (detachment)
  - 2nd Flank Company – Lt. Richard D. Fraser
- Royal Newfoundland Fencibles – Maj. Rowland Heathcote

American forces

- New York Militia – Capt. Giffin, Lt. Church
- Gun Boat

== Aftermath ==
Canadian losses were one killed and several wounded, while the Americans suffered considerable losses.

The St. Lawrence front was quiet again until September when the Americans raided Gananoque, and the militia would retaliate in October with the Assault on Ogdensburg.
