= John Kilborn =

Upper Canada politician

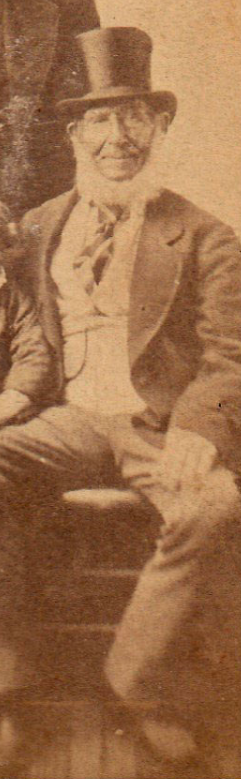
- Col. John Kilborn

Member of the Legislative Assembly of Upper Canada for Leeds
- In office 1828–1830

Brockville Postmaster
- In office 1852–1853

Associate Judge of Assize for Brockville
- In office 1853–1855

Personal details
- Born: June 27, 1794 Elizabethtown Township, Leeds
- Died: March 25, 1888 (aged 93) Newboro, North Crosby, Leeds
- Party: Reformer
- Occupation: Soldier; politician; merchant; justice of the peace

Military service
- Allegiance: Upper Canada
- Branch/service: Canadian militia
- Years of service: 1812–1850
- Rank: Sergeant; Ensign; Captain; Lt-Colonel
- Unit: 1st Flank Company, Leeds Militia (1812-13); Incorporated Militia of Upper Canada (1813-15); 1st Battalion, Leeds Militia (1818-29); 4th Battalion, Leeds Militia (1830-37); 2nd Battalion, Leeds Militia (1837-45)
- Commands: 8th Battalion, Leeds Militia (1846-50)
- Battles/wars: War of 1812: First Battle of Ogdensburg; Battle of Lundy's Lane (POW); Rebellions of 1837–1838

John Kilborn (June 27, 1794 – March 25, 1888) was a militiaman, merchant, lumberman and political figure in Upper Canada, and was an early settler of Newboro, North Crosby.

== Early life ==
He was born in Elizabethtown Township, Upper Canada, the son of David Kilborn and Hannah White, and was educated near Brockville. He was of United Empire Loyalist stock.

== War of 1812 ==
=== Leeds Militia ===
During the War of 1812, Kilborn enlisted as a private in the 1st Flank Company of the Leeds Militia in Brockville. He later recalled:

I, with other men volunteered to serve in the First Flank Company of the County of Leeds, under Captain John Stuart, late Sheriff of Johnstown District, for six month’s service, and I happened to be the first man placed on duty by Lieutenant William Morris to guard the Kingston road, near the bridge at the West end of Brockville. I continued on duty with the company, being drilled daily by Lieutenant Morris.

He served on duty in Brockville and fought in the First Battle of Ogdensburg on October 4, 1812, which was launched from Prescott:

Assistance from the Brockville men was asked for, and with about forty others, I volunteered and marched to Prescott during the night, under the command of Reuben Sherwood and Lieutenant William Morris. Boats were made ready, and, early in the morning, led by Colonel Lethbridge, with part of a company of regulars, the attack was made. The boat I was in was commanded by William Morris. After getting near the batteries (which they plied constantly), and in front of the town [Ogdensburg], we failed to effect a landing and returned to Prescott. The loss in our boat was one killed and eight wounded.

He may also have fought with the Leeds Militia at the Second Battle of Ogdensburg in February 1813, afterwards being promoted to Sergeant in the Flank Company.

=== Incorporated Militia ===
On April 17, 1813, Kilborn was appointed an Ensign in Captain Thomas Fraser's Company of the Incorporated Militia of Upper Canada and served at Prescott as a Quarter Master for the Incorporated Militia of the Eastern District. He recalled:

That winter, the Parliament of Upper Canada passed a law to raise a Provincial Regiment, to serve during the war. Unsolicited and unexpected, I received recruiting orders from the commanding officer at Prescott, to enlist a certain number of men, and get a commission in the new Battalion. In this I succeeded, and received an ensign’s commission in Captain Thomas Fraser’s company, the first one organized of the regiment. I was soon appointed to act as quartermaster, with pay and allowances increased to that grade. In this capacity I served until the month of March following, when the regiment was ordered to York, to be more perfectly drilled and disciplined.

Kilborn remained in Prescott until early 1814, being posted to York on March 7, 1814, to join the Incorporated Militia there. From May 25 until June 1, he was on duty at Fort George, but with the defeat at Chippewa on July 6 the Militia marched hastily towards Niagara. He recalled:

The next day we marched for Chippewa. The day being hot, on reaching the Falls, we stacked arms, and rested for half-an-hour, when, again starting for our destination, we were soon met by our troops from Chippewa, they having destroyed and abandoned our works there bringing all the guns and stores that teams could be got to draw, accompanied by hundreds of women and children, besides men on foot and vehicles, making their way to Fort George, as a place of safety, the enemy being in pursuit, and not far behind. Our regiment, having had a slow and fatiguing march already, wheeled about, and was given a special privilege and benefit of marching in front. Retracing our steps as fast as possible, we reached the foot of the mountain, at Queenston, a little after dark, where a short halt was made, and where we got a drink of muddy sulphur water that crossed the road, and had served to each man and officer about half-a-pound of bread that had been brought in an open wagon, and was pretty well filled with dust and gravel, gladly eating and drinking such as could be got. Having rested awhile, the march was continued for Fort George, seven miles distance.

After starting for Fort George, we were halted at McFarland’s, a large deserted brick house, about a mile outside the fort, as a piquet guard, until morning, the remainder of our force passing on to the fort. After placing sentries, all found a resting place on the floor of the house and ground of the orchard near by, until daylight, from whence we could see the tents of the enemy, established on the mountain, six miles from us.

After daylight we were marched to Niagara, and encamped within range of the fort, remaining there several days. During that time, the Americans had advanced to McFarland’s, and placed guards and piquets, nearly surrounding us with sentries. We, of course did the same, which brought them and our sentries within speaking distance of each other. On several occasions, attempts were made, particularly at night, to capture our sentries and guards.

=== Lundy's Lane ===
Kilborn then fought at the Battle of Lundy's Lane with the Incorporated Militia. He stated:

Our men standing exposed in the open field to their fire until the approaching darkness and smoke hid them from view, except what could be seen by the fire of their muskets. In this position,, our men falling fast around us, we stood until some time after darkness had come on: how it was on our right I could not see.

Before too dark our line had advanced nearer the woods in front, and I could frequently see the enemy moving to our right, apparently for the purpose of outflanking us and getting to our rear – nor was I mistaken. Some time after dark, Lieutenant McDougall, of the Grenadier Company, which was on the right of our company and nearer the main road, came to me saying that I was too far in advance, that our men on the right had fallen back some distance and were likely to fire into us from behind. I told him what I suspected, that they were trying to outflank us and get in our rear. He at once proposed to extend our line towards the river, and, at the same time falling back to regain our line to the right. While doing so, I came directly on a company of Americans formed two deep, the front rank with bayonets charged and the rear rank presented ready to fire. I was within twenty feet of them when discovered.

The officer at the head of the company demanded a surrender. I hesitated for a short time, but seeing no possibility of escape, I told the men near me to thrown down their muskets. Three or four others that were much farther from them than we were attempted to escape, also Lieutenant McDougall. They were shot down and probably killed, except Lieutenant McDougall, who was reported in the General’s order the next day as being mortally wounded with six buckshot. He recovered, however, and lived many years after. After I had, with five or six men, surrendered, the lieutenant in command of the company of about sixty men, formed his men in a hollow square, placed his prisoners within it, and marched us round near the river, and up by the Falls in rear of their army, and beyond the reach of a shot from either side.

During the battle he was captured by American forces and held as a prisoner of war until the end of the conflict in 1815, when he returned to Canada.

== Post-war ==
In 1816, Kilborn married Elizabeth Baldwin. He lived in Brockville, later settling at Kilmarnock. He remained in the militia, being appointed an Ensign in the 1st Battalion, Leeds Militia in 1818, and subsequently Captain in the 4th Battalion, Leeds Militia in 1830.

Kilborn represented Leeds in the Legislative Assembly of Upper Canada from 1828 to 1830 as a Reformer alongside William Buell Jr. He was named a justice of the peace for the Johnstown District in 1833, and owned a lumber business in Kilmarnock supplying the government with wood for the Rideau Canal. In the mid-1830s, Kilborn moved to Newboro in North Crosby township and was a prominent local merchant.

During the Rebellion of 1838, he commanded a company of the 2nd Battalion, Leeds Militia at Gananoque for six months. He was appointed a Major in the 2nd Leeds Militia in 1841, and Lieutenant-Colonel commanding the 8th Battalion, Leeds Militia in 1846. The 8th Leeds Militia may have been based in North Crosby Township.

In 1852, he was named postmaster at Brockville and served as associate judge of assize at Brockville from 1853 to 1855. He eventually returned to Newboro where he worked as a merchant and gained local prominence. Part of his 1832 home remains as the Stirling Lodge in Newboro and the local store "Kilborn's on the Rideau" bears his name.

John Kilborn died in Newboro on March 25, 1888.
