= Richard Duncan (Upper Canada politician) =

Legislative Council of Upper Canada for Williamsburg
- In office 1792–1805

Personal details
- Born: 1740 Berwick-upon-Tweed, England
- Died: February 1819 (aged 78–79) Schenectady, New York
- Occupation: Judge, local official, soldier

Military service
- Allegiance: Great Britain; Upper Canada
- Branch/service: British Army; Canadian militia
- Years of service: 1758 - 1761; 1765 - 1768; 1777 - 1783; 1793
- Rank: Ensign; Captain; Colonel
- Unit: 44th Regiment of Foot; 55th Regiment of Foot; King's Royal Regiment of New York; Dundas County Militia
- Battles/wars: French and Indian War: Battle of Carillon; Battle of Fort Niagara; Montreal Campaign; American Revolution: Northern New York Campaign; Battle of Klock's Field; Spanish Armament of 1793

Richard Duncan (died February 1819) was a soldier, judge and political figure in Upper Canada.

He was born in Berwick-upon-Tweed, England. He came to New York state in 1755 with his father, who was a lieutenant in the 44th Regiment of Foot in the British Army, and joined the army himself in 1758. From 1765-1767 he served as an Ensign with the 55th (Westmorland) Regiment of Foot in Ireland. After the end of the Seven Years' War, he was involved in the fur trade in the Great Lakes area. He fought with the King's Royal Regiment of New York during the American Revolution, being appointed Captain on June 19, 1776. After John Burgoyne's surrender at Saratoga, he went to Quebec and joined the loyalist troops there. He commanded a company in the KRRNY during the Valley Campaigns in 1779 - 1781, including at the Battle of Klock's Field where he performed with "great gallantry and success".

In 1788, he became a judge and a member of the land board in the Lunenburg District. In 1792, he became the County Lieutenant of Dundas and a member of the Legislative Council of Upper Canada. He was the first Colonel of the Dundas County Militia, and commanded the militia during the Spanish Armament tensions in 1793-94.

Though he was granted large plots of land in Upper Canada as a Loyalist, including the land which would become the village of Chesterville, Duncan spent much of his time looking after his business interests in New York and was dropped from the Legislative Council for non-attendance in 1805.

Duncan was mostly residing in New York after 1809 or 1810 and died at his father's estate near Schenectady, New York in 1819.
