= Henry Merkley =

Loyalist soldier and Upper Canada politician

Member of the Legislative Assembly of Upper Canada for Dundas
- In office 1808–1812

Personal details
- Born: March 24, 1756 Albany, New York
- Died: July 29, 1836 (aged 80) Williamsburg, Dundas County
- Occupation: Soldier, politician, farmer

Military service
- Allegiance: Great Britain; Upper Canada
- Branch/service: British Army; Canadian militia
- Years of service: 1777 - 1784; 1803 - 1814
- Rank: Private; Lieutenant; Lieutenant-Colonel
- Unit: King's Royal Regiment of New York; Dundas County Militia
- Battles/wars: American Revolution: Northern New York Campaign; War of 1812: Battle of Crysler's Farm

Henry Merkley (1756–1836) was a farmer and political figure in Upper Canada. He represented Dundas in the Legislative Assembly of Upper Canada from 1808 to 1812.

He was born in the Thirteen Colonies, the son of Christopher Merkley, of German descent, and served in the King's Royal Regiment of New York. After the American Revolution, Merkley came to Montreal and later settled in Williamsburgh Township. He was a Major in the Dundas County Militia during the War of 1812, later reaching the rank of lieutenant-colonel. Merkley was present at the Battle of Crysler's Farm.
