= Richard Duncan Fraser =

Canadian politician

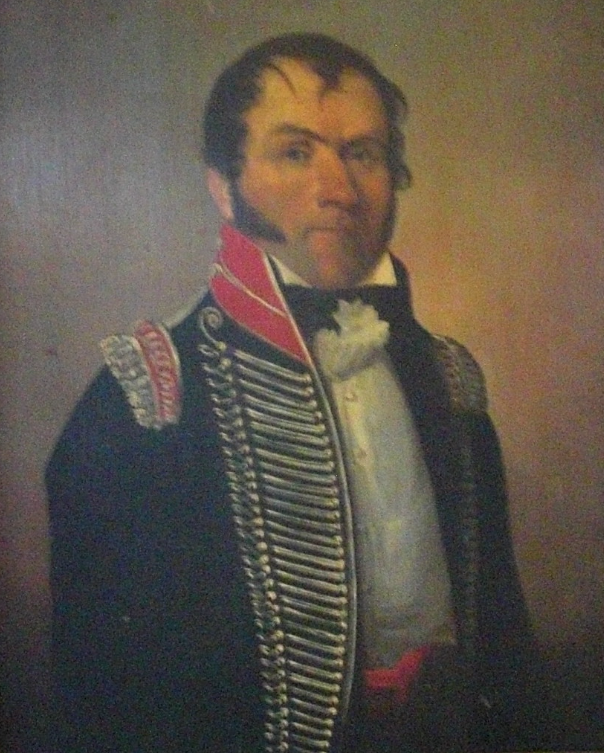
- Col. Richard D. Fraser

MLA for Grenville
- In office 1830–1831
- Preceded by: George Longley
- Succeeded by: Hiram Norton

Personal details
- Born: 1784 Quebec, Lower Canada
- Died: April 1, 1857 (aged 72–73) Grenville County, Upper Canada
- Relatives: Thomas Fraser (father)
- Occupation: Soldier

Military service
- Allegiance: Upper Canada
- Branch/service: Canadian militia
- Years of service: 1812 - 1815; 1837 - 1838
- Rank: Lieutenant; Captain; Colonel
- Unit: Grenville County Militia; Dundas County Militia; Captain Fraser's Provincial Light Dragoons
- Battles/wars: War of 1812: Battle of Matilda; Battle of Ogdensburg; Battle of Crysler's Farm; Upper Canada Rebellion: Battle of the Windmill

Richard Duncan Fraser (ca. 1784 – April 1, 1857) was a fur trader, businessman, farmer and political figure in Upper Canada.

He was born in Quebec around 1784, the son of Thomas Fraser, and grew up in Edwardsburgh Township in Upper Canada. He worked from 1802 to 1806 as a clerk for the North West Company with Duncan Cameron at Lake Nipigon. He returned to Upper Canada in 1807 and settled at Johnstown. He served as lieutenant in the Dundas County Militia during the War of 1812, becoming captain in 1813 and raising his own Troop of Provincial Light Dragoons, and fought at the Battle of Crysler's Farm. Fraser was named justice of the peace in the Johnstown District in 1816. In 1818, he was fined for an assault on Robert Gourlay who was holding meetings in the eastern part of Upper Canada. He was elected to the Legislative Assembly of Upper Canada in 1830 for Grenville. In 1832, he was appointed customs collector at Brockville. He was Colonel of the Grenville County Militia and commanded the overall combined militia regiments at the Battle of the Windmill in 1838. In 1839, Fraser triggered some friction between Canada and the United States when he seized an American schooner for failing to declare a cannon to customs. By 1840, several banks had secured judgements against him for unpaid loans and the government was pressing him for customs duties that he had collected but not provided. He lost his post as customs collector and justice of the peace in 1843. He retired to the farm that he had named Fraserfield located on the Saint Lawrence, where he died in 1857.
