= George Greenfield Macdonell =

Mayor of Cornwall
- In office 1847–1848
- Preceded by: Office established
- Succeeded by: Charles Rattray

Member of the 2nd Parliament of the Province of Canada for Dundas
- In office November 28, 1844 – December 1847
- Preceded by: John Cook
- Succeeded by: John Pliny Crysler

Judge Surrogate for Stormont, Dundas and Glengarry
- In office 1847–1857

Captain Loyal Glengarry Highlanders
- In office January 8, 1838. – Before January 1, 1845

Personal details
- Born: June 4, 1808 North West Territory
- Spouse: Sarah Chesley
- Relations: Alexander Macdonell of Greenfield, father John Macdonell of Greenfield, uncle Donald Macdonell of Greenfield, uncle
- Children: Angus R. Greenfield Macdonell; George A. J. Greenfield Macdonell; Plomer-Young Greenfield Macdonell; Sarah C. Greenfield Macdonell; Catherine J. Greenfield Macdonell; Margaret Greenfield Macdonell
- Occupation: Lawyer

George Greenfield Macdonell (June 4, 1808–before 1878) was from a prominent family in Upper Canada. He was the first son of Alexander Macdonell of Greenfield, a nephew of John Macdonell of Greenfield and Donald Macdonell of Greenfield, and a great-nephew of Sir Hugh MacDonell of Aberchalder and John McDonell of Aberchalder.

In the tradition of his forefathers George entered military service obtaining the rank of Captain, serving under his uncle Lieutenant-Colonel Donald McDonell of Greenfield. Most notably George led the Lancaster Glengarry Highlanders during the 1838 Battle of the Windmill George's brother Angus (later a Lieutenant) had served under him as an Ensign during the battle. Angus was injured which ultimately led to his untimely death in 1843. One of the individuals who battled alongside George was Plomer Young. George would name a son in his honor.

George later wrote of the battle in detail stating: “…we received orders to take charge which we did and put an end to the engagement, killing numbers taking prisoners and forcing the residue of the enemy to retreat into the Windmill, from whence they were forced to surrender in three days afterwards;…”

George was one of just a few participants in the battle who were singled out by the Lieutenant Governor of Upper Canada, Sir George Arthur, Bt. who wrote “The Major-General also offers his warmest thanks to Colonel the Honourable Henry Dundas, R.A., for the able disposition of his force and his indefatigable exertions; to Colonel McBean, R.A.; to Colonel R. Duncan Fraser; to Lieutenant-Colonel Gowan and Captain George Greenfield Macdonell and to all the officers of the militia…”

During the Battle of the Windmill George would serve alongside others with whom he would also later serve in Parliament including Ogle Robert Gowan, who represented Leeds in the 2nd Parliament and John Pliny Crysler who succeeded George as the member for Dundas in the 3rd Parliament.

George entered the practice of law and was called to the bar in 1830 in Glengarry County. He subsequently was to practice for some years in St. Catharines in partnership with Rolland Macdonald whom he had also served with in the 2nd Parliament. Rolland was the son of John MacDonald of Garth, who had worked very closely with George's father Alexander in the North West Company. Both George and Rolland were born in the Northwest Territory of fur trading fathers and Métis mothers.

In 1841 George married Sarah Chesley, daughter of John Chesley and niece of Solomon Yeomans Chesley.

Throughout his life George filled a number of public service roles including serving as a Judge Surrogate from 1847 - 1857. In 1847 he was elected as one of the first councilors to the Cornwall Board of Police following a new act that had come into force under his leadership as Chairman the prior year. This council then selected George as the first Mayor of Cornwall for a term of one year. In 1860 George became the Warden for the District.

Following in the footsteps of his father and numerous uncles and cousins George was also to serve as a Member of Parliament. Elected in 1844, George served a period of four years as the representative for Dundas during the 2nd Parliament of the Province of Canada (after the union of the Provinces of Upper Canada and Lower Canada in 1841).
