= Battle of St. Regis =

Battle

- Part of War of 1812
Date	October 23, 1812
Location	Akwesasne
Result	American victory

Belligerents
United Kingdom; Lower Canada	United States

Commanders and leaders
Captain Louvigny de Montigny (surrendered)	Major Guilford Dudley Young

Strength
45	200

Casualties and losses
5 killed 40 captured	None

The Battle of St. Regis was a military skirmish during the War of 1812, occurring on October 23, 1812, on the Saint Lawrence River front at the U.S.–Canadian border. Two miles outside of St. Regis, 45 Canadian voyageurs were stationed in a house to watch for American attacks and provide confidence to the Mohawks in the area. A larger American force under Major Guilford Dudley was able to surprise the Canadians and take most of them captive.

== Background ==
The village of St. Regis was on land belonging to the Mowhawk first nation tribe. Forty-five Canadian voyageurs were stationed 2 miles from St. Regis to watch for American attacks and give confidence to the Natives in the area. Seven miles away the Americans built a blockhouse at French Mills. One hundred Americans commanded by Major Guilford Dudley Young left their Blockhouse at French Mills and marched against the Canadians at St. Regis.

== Action ==
At 5:00 am, the Americans arrived a half-mile from the Canadians and hid behind a small hill. They rested, prepared, and made a plan of attack. Most of the Canadians were sleeping in a house except for a few on guard duty. The plan of attack was for Captain Lyon to lead a detachment on their right to go up the St. Regis River and to the rear of the house. Captain Dilden led a detachment whose goal was to move along the St. Lawrence River and capture the Canadians' boats. The main force under Young advanced directly towards the house. Youngs' force stopped 150 yards from the house and opened fire on the guards. Lyon's force also engaged with Canadians at the rear of the house. After the first volley from Young and Lyon's men the Canadians surrendered. Five Canadians had been killed and another 40 were taken prisoner.

== Aftermath ==
The victorious Americans looted the house the Canadians were staying in as well as the dead Voyageurs. While many of the Americans involved were ordered to Plattsburgh many stayed at French Mills. British and Canadian soldiers would lead a successful attack on French Mills killing or capturing many of the Americans who were at St. Regis.

== Sources ==
- Hannings, Bud (2012). The War of 1812: A Complete Chronology with biographies of 63 General Officers. McFarland and Company Inc. ISBN 9780786463855.
- Bonaparte, Darren (September 12, 2018). "October 23, 1812: The Skirmish at St. Regis". Indian Country Today.
