= John Crysler =

Upper Canada politician

Member of the Legislative Assembly of Upper Canada for Dundas
- In office 1804–1808

Member of the Legislative Assembly of Upper Canada for Dundas
- In office 1812–1820

Member of the Legislative Assembly of Upper Canada for Dundas
- In office 1825–1828

Personal details
- Born: July 24, 1770 Schoharie, New York
- Died: January 18, 1852 (aged 81) Stormont County, Ontario
- Relatives: John Pliny Crysler (son)
- Occupation: Soldier, politician, miller, justice of the peace

Military service
- Allegiance: Great Britain; Upper Canada
- Branch/service: British Army; Canadian militia
- Years of service: 1780 - 1784; 1812 - 1838
- Rank: Drummer; Lieutenant; Colonel
- Unit: Butler's Rangers; 1st Regiment of Dundas Militia
- Battles/wars: American Revolution: Northern New York Campaign; War of 1812: Battle of Crysler's Farm; Upper Canada Rebellion: Battle of the Windmill

John Crysler (July 24, 1770 – January 18, 1852) was a businessman and political figure in Upper Canada.

He was born in Schoharie, New York in 1770, the son of German immigrants; the family name was originally spelled Krausler or Kruessler. His father served in the King's Royal Regiment of New York during the American Revolution under Sir John Johnson; and John Crysler was a drummer boy with Butler's Rangers. They both settled in Williamsburgh Township after the war. Crysler operated a tavern, cut timber to supply the Royal Navy with masts and built gristmills and sawmills. In 1804, he was elected to the Legislative Assembly of Upper Canada, representing Dundas for one term until 1808. In 1806, he was appointed justice of the peace in the Eastern District. He served with the Dundas County Militia during the War of 1812, becoming captain. His home was used as the British headquarters during the Battle of Crysler's Farm, which gave the battle its name, though the battle itself was fought on the neighbouring properties to the east. He again represented Dundas in the Legislative Assembly from 1812 to 1820 and from 1825 to 1828. In 1825, some of his employees were jailed for cutting timber on clergy reserves. He became lieutenant-colonel in command of the Dundas County Militia in 1838 and led his regiment into combat at the Battle of the Windmill.

He died in Finch Township in 1852. The village of Crysler was named after him. His son John Pliny served in the Legislative Assembly of the Province of Canada. The former location of his farm was submerged when the St. Lawrence Seaway was built; a monument erected in 1895 on the site of the battle was moved to Upper Canada Village in 1958.
