= Dundas County, Ontario =

County in the province of Ontario, Canada

Coordinates: 45°00′N 75°17′W

Dundas County is a former county in the province of Ontario, Canada. It was named after Henry Dundas, 1st Viscount Melville, who was the British Home Secretary (1791–1794), with responsibility for the colonies.

Dundas was first settled by individuals of European background in 1784, when German Loyalists who had fought with Sir John Johnson in the American Revolutionary War re-settled in Canada. The settlers were descendants of the Palatine immigrants to America in 1710.

== Boundaries ==
In 1792, Dundas County was formally established by a proclamation of the Lieutenant Governor of Upper Canada, John Graves Simcoe, which established several counties in Upper Canada including Dundas. The boundaries of Dundas county were defined as follows:

That the third of the said counties be hereafter called by the name of the county of Dundas; which county is to be bounded on the east by the westernmost boundary line of the county of Stormont, on the south by the river St. Lawrence, and on the west by the easternmost boundary line of the late township of Edwardsburgh, running north twenty-four degrees west until it intersects the Ottawa or Grand river, thence descending the said river until it meets the northwesternmost boundary of the county of Stormont. The said county of Dundas is to comprehend all the islands in the said river St. Lawrence nearest to the said county, in the whole or greater part fronting the same.

Dundas originally stretched farther to the north, but in 1800, when Carleton County was established, parts of Dundas County were made part of Carleton County. The new boundaries for Dundas were as follows:

That the townships of Williamsburg, Matilda, Mountain, and Winchester, with such of the islands in the river Saint Lawrence as are wholly or in greater part opposite thereto, do together constitute and form the county of Dundas.

In 1850, Dundas united with Stormont and Glengarry to form the regional government United Counties of Stormont, Dundas and Glengarry.

== Original townships ==
- Matilda (area 62,327 acres (252 km^{2})), was first settled in 1784 by German Loyalists. The Township was formally organized in 1787. The Township was named in honour of the Princess Royal, Charlotte Augusta Matilda, who married the King of Württemberg in 1797. During the War of 1812 a wooden fort and earthwork was established at Point Iroquois and named Fort Provost or Fort Needless, and three battles occurred in the vicinity: the Battle of Matilda, Battle of Point Iroquois, and the Skirmish at Doran's Farm. This Township is now part of South Dundas
  - Community centres: Iroquois, Irena, Dundela, Glen Stewart, Brinston, Hulbert and Pleasant Valley
- Mountain (area 57,778 acres (234 km^{2})), was organized in 1798 and named in honour of the first Church of England Bishop of Quebec, Rev. Jacob Mountain. This Township is now part of North Dundas
  - Community centres: Mountain, South Mountain, Hallville, and Inkerman
- Williamsburgh (area 59,482 acres (241 km^{2})), was settled in 1784 it became a Township in 1787. Named in honour of Prince William Henry, third son of George III, afterwards King William IV. The famous Battle of Crysler's Farm was fought on Lot 12, Concession I on the Fetterly and Crysler farms. A monument was placed there in 1895. This Township is now part of South Dundas.
  - Community centres: Morrisburg, Williamsburg, Aultsville, Frostburg, Bouck’s Hill, Dunbar and Archer
- Winchester (area 56,844 acres (230 km^{2})), was opened in 1798 and named after the English city of Winchester. This Township is now part of North Dundas.
  - Community centres: Winchester, Chesterville, Morewood, Winchester Springs, North Winchester (Cannamore), Ormond, Melville and Cass Bridge

== See also ==
- List of Ontario census divisions
- List of townships in Ontario
