= North Dundas, Ontario =

North Dundas
- Township (lower-tier)
- Township of North Dundas
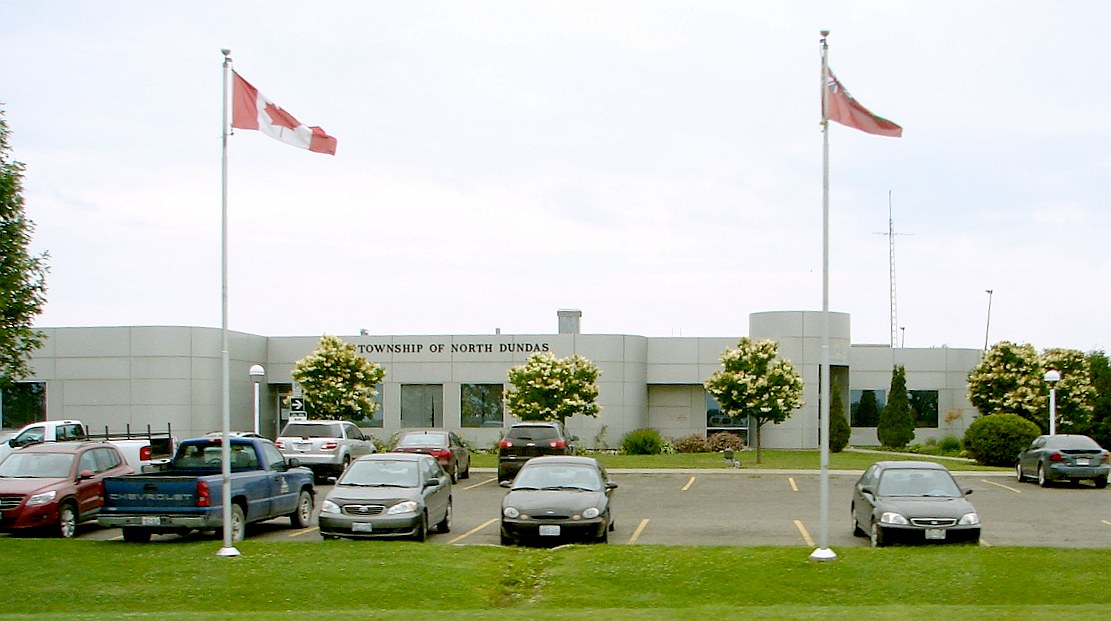
- North Dundas township office in Winchester

- Location within United Counties of Stormont, Dundas and Glengarry Location within Southern Ontario
- Coordinates: 45°05′00″N 75°20′51″W
- Country: Canada
- Province: Ontario
- County: Stormont, Dundas and Glengarry
- Founded: 1798 (as Winchester and Mountain townships)
- Formed: January 1, 1998

Government
  - Type: Township
  - Mayor: Tony Fraser
  - Deputy Mayor: Theresa Bergeron
  - Federal riding: Stormont—Dundas—Glengarry
  - Prov. riding: Stormont—Dundas—South Glengarry

Area
  - Land: 502.41 km^{2} (193.98 sq mi)

Population (2021)
  - Total: 11,782
  - Density: 23.5/km^{2} (61/sq mi)
- Time zone: UTC−05:00 (EST)
  - Summer (DST): UTC−04:00 (EDT)
- Postal code FSA: K0C
- Area codes: 613, 343
- Website: www.northdundas.com

North Dundas is a township in Eastern Ontario, Canada, in the United Counties of Stormont, Dundas and Glengarry.

North Dundas is located approximately 50 km (31 mi) south of downtown Ottawa, midway between Ottawa and Morrisburg. It is primarily rural with a few small villages. It is spread across the South Nation River and the East Castor River watersheds.

The township was incorporated on January 1, 1998, by amalgamating the former townships of Mountain and Winchester with the independent villages of Chesterville and Winchester. The village of Winchester is the township's primary administrative centre.

== Communities ==
The township of North Dundas comprises a number of villages and hamlets, including the following communities:

- In the former Mountain Township: Hallville, Harmony, Inkerman, Mountain, South Mountain; Belmeade, Inkerman Station, North Mountain, Reid's Mills, Rosehaven, Van Camps; Baldwins Bridge, Cloverdale, Mulloys, Oak Valley, Vinegar Hill; Hyndman's Ridge, Kerr's Ridge
- In the former Winchester Township: Chesterville, Marionville (partially), Morewood, Mountain, Ormond, Winchester; Cannamore (partially), Cass Bridge, Connaught, Melvin, North Winchester, Winchester Springs (partially); Annable, Bethune Bush, Forward, Limerick, Maple Ridge, Nation Valley, The Boyne, The Ninth, Toyes Hill.

The township administrative offices are located in Winchester.

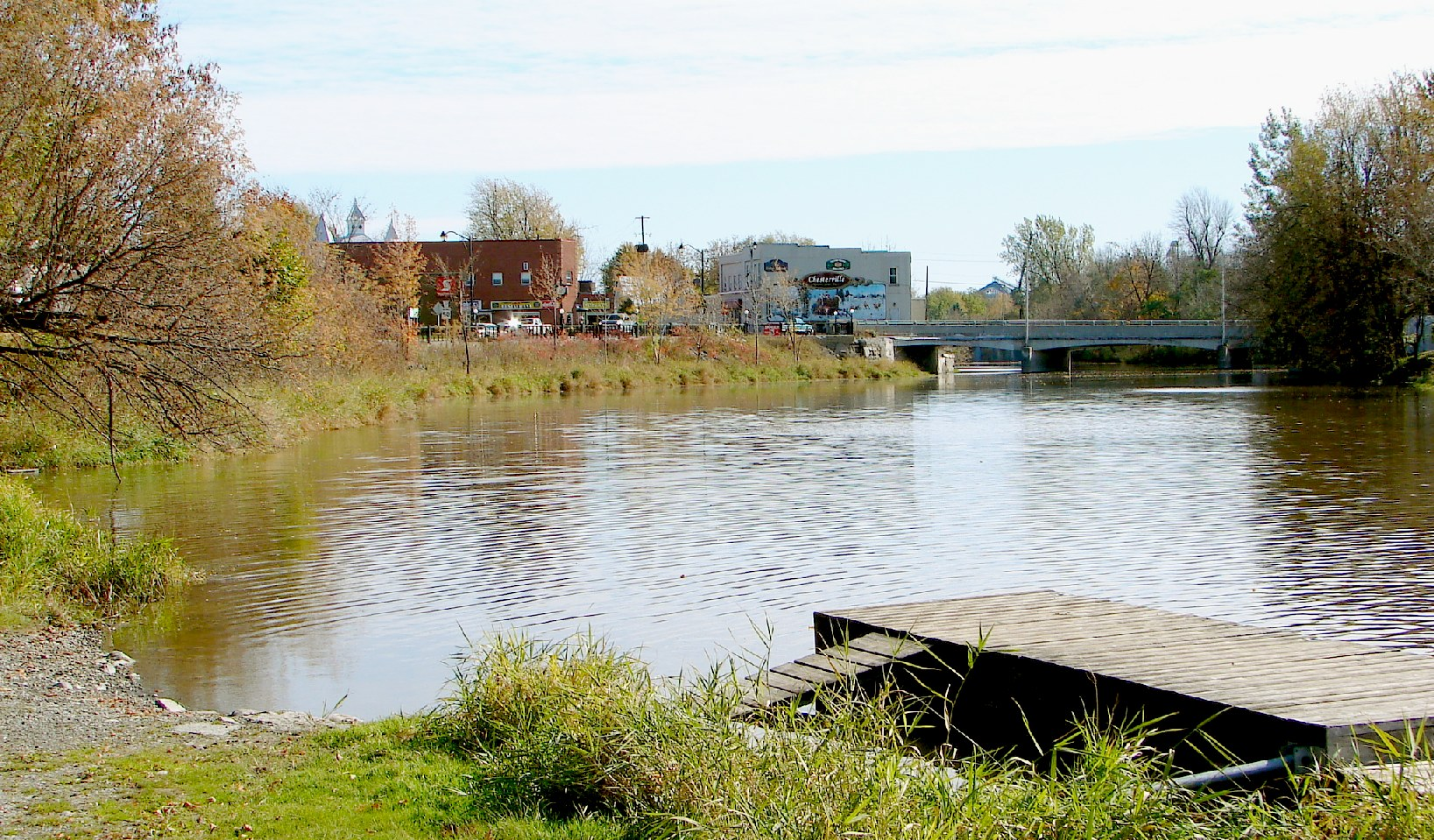
Chesterville on the South Nation River

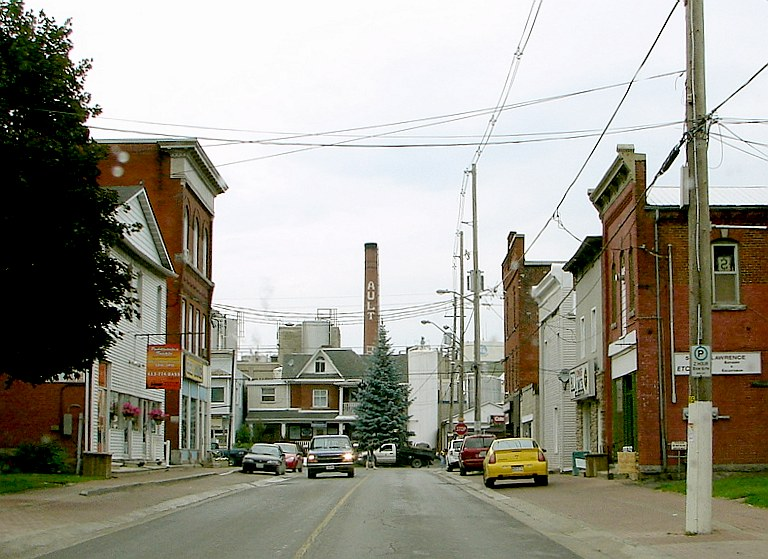
Winchester

== Demographics ==
In the 2021 Census of Population conducted by Statistics Canada, North Dundas had a population of 11,304 living in 4,537 of its 4,673 total private dwellings, a change of 0.2% from its 2016 population of 11,278. With a land area of 502.41 km^{2} (193.98 sq mi), it had a population density of 22.5/km^{2} (58.3/sq mi) in 2021.

Canada census – North Dundas community profile

	2021	2016	2011
Population	11,782 (+4.5% from 2016)	11,278 (+0.5% from 2011)	11,225 (+1.2% from 2006)
Land area	502.41 km^{2} (193.98 sq mi)	503.08 km^{2} (194.24 sq mi)	503.21 km^{2} (194.29 sq mi)
Population density	23.5/km^{2} (61/sq mi)	22.4/km^{2} (58/sq mi)	22.3/km^{2} (58/sq mi)
Median age	44.8 (M: 44, F: 46)	45.3 (M: 44.1, F: 46.4)	45.3 (M: 44.2, F: 46.2)
Private dwellings	4,880 (total) 4,739 (occupied)	4,642 (total)	4,518 (total)
Median household income	$90,000	$78,192

Notes: 2021 data based on revised population and dwelling counts.
References: 2021 2016 2011

Historical census populations – North Dundas, Ontario

Year	Pop.	±%
1851	5,329	—
1861	7,774	+45.9%
1871	7,349	−5.5%
1881	8,515	+15.9%
1891	8,780	+3.1%
1901	9,045	+3.0%
1911	8,487	−6.2%
1921	8,462	−0.3%
1931	7,801	−7.8%

Year	Pop.	±%
1941	7,791	−0.1%
1951	7,332	−5.9%
1956	7,699	+5.0%
1961	8,089	+5.1%
1966	7,984	−1.3%
1971	8,085	+1.3%
1976	8,760	+8.3%
1981	9,239	+5.5%
1986	9,851	+6.6%

Year	Pop.	±%
1991	10,661	+8.2%
1996	11,064	+3.8%
2001	11,014	−0.5%
2006	11,095	+0.7%
2011	11,225	+1.2%
2016	11,278	+0.5%
2021	11,782	+4.5%

2021 population figure based on revised count. Population numbers prior to 1998 are totals for the Townships of Mountain and Winchester and the Villages of Chesterville and Winchester.
Source: Statistics Canada

== Politics ==
In 1998, the Villages of Winchester and Chesterville and the Townships of Winchester and Mountain were amalgamated into the Township of North Dundas. The Township of North Dundas Council replaced the councils of the four former municipalities.

North Dundas Township Officers
Year	Mayor & Deputy Mayor	Councillors
1998–2000	Claude Cousineau	Ward 1 (Winchester Township): Alvin Runnalls; Martin Schoones; Ward 2 (Mountain Township): Keith Fawcett; Estella Rose; Ward 3 (Winchester Village): Bob Riddell; David Sloane; Ward 4 (Chesterville Village): Gail Parker; Roger Cole
2000–2003	Claude Cousineau	Ward 1: Alvin Runnalls; Martin Schoones; Ward 2: Keith Fawcett; Estella Rose; Ward 3: Allan Armstrong; David Sloane; Ward 4: Gail Parker; Roger Cole
2003–2006	Alvin Runnalls; Bill Smirle	Allan Armstrong; Estella Rose; Martin Schoones
2006–2010	Alvin Runnalls; Estella Rose	Allan Armstrong; Eric Duncan; John Thompson
2010–2018	Eric Duncan; Gerry Boyce	Allan Armstrong; Tony Fraser; John Thompson
2018–2022	Tony Fraser; Allan Armstrong	Gary Annable; Tyler Hoy; John Thompson
2022–2026	Tony Fraser; Theresa Bergeron	Gary Annable; John Lennox; Matthew Uhrig

== Events ==
There are a number of major summer fairs and festivals that take place in the Township of North Dundas. Every summer, Chesterville holds a summer agricultural fair. The Village of Winchester hosts "Dairyfest" in early August and the Village of South Mountain hosts their summer agricultural fair also in August.

The Village of Chesterville hosts the Chesterville Farmer's Market on the waterfront every Saturday during the summer months, and an annual Art on the Waterfront in June.

== Education ==
There are three public elementary schools, one Catholic elementary school, and one public high school in North Dundas:

- Winchester Public School (JK-Grade 6): 547 Louise Street South, Winchester. Winchester Public School was founded in 1890. The original building burned down in 1927 and a new school was built on the same lot later that year.
- Chesterville Public School (JK-Grade 6): 38 College Street, Chesterville. Chesterville Public School was founded in 1902. The original building was demolished in 1963 to make way for a larger, more modern school. Happy Face Nursery School operates out of this location, offering the following programs: Toddler (18–30 months of age), Preschool (2.5–6 years of age), Kindergarten (6–8 years of age), and School Age (8–13 years of age).
- Nationview Public School (JK-Grade 6): 3045 County Road 1, South Mountain. Nationview Public School was founded in 1971. The school formerly taught students from kindergarten to grade 8, but this ended in June 2011 due to declining enrolment. After this, grade 7 and 8 students were primarily split between North Dundas Intermediate School in Chesterville and Seaway High School in Iroquois. Happy Face Nursery School operates out of this location, offering the following programs: Infant (0–18 months of age), Toddler (18–30 months of age), Preschool (2.5–6 years of age), Kindergarten (6–8 years of age), and School Age (8–13 years of age).
- St. Mary's Catholic School (JK-Grade 6): 67 Main Street South, Chesterville. St. Mary's Catholic School was founded in 1903. From 1907 to 1972, the Sisters of Providence taught at the school. The original school was demolished in 1963 to make way for a larger, more modern school.
- North Dundas District High School (Grades 7–12): 12835 County Road 43, Chesterville. North Dundas District High School was founded in 1963. Following a fire in 1962 that destroyed Winchester High School (founded 1914), the North Dundas District High School Board (later part of the SDG Board of Education, then the Upper Canada District School Board) built an amalgamated high school to service both Winchester and Chesterville, as well as the surrounding areas. As a consequence, Chesterville High School (founded 1911), was demolished in 1963. Due to declining enrolment, Maple Ridge Senior Elementary School closed in 2011 and the North Dundas Intermediate School was created for grades 7 and 8. The Intermediate School is located on the second floor of NDDHS.

== Media ==
The community has been served by a number of newspapers over the years.

- West Winchester Directory (1881-1888) and Winchester Press (1888–2020). The West Winchester Directory was a weekly newspaper founded by Eli Lester White in 1881. In 1887, it was sold to Rolla Law Crain of Merrickville, who owned it only a year before selling to Byron Lane in 1888. With the recent incorporation of the village under the name of Winchester, Lane renamed the newspaper the Winchester Press. The first edition of the Press was published in April or May of 1888. George H. Challies, who later served as MPP for the area, was a newspaper boy for the Press in 1894. The Press was sold in 1912 to George C. Lacey, who later sold it in 1915 to James H. Ross after buying the Chesterville Record. The business was devastated in 1921 when a fire destroyed their office, which was located on the south side of Main Street West, directly beside the store owned by Aaron Sweet (now Sweet Corner Park), but it soon re-established itself. For the next 30 years, it had several homes, including the Dixon pump factory (Church Street), a building that used to be at the current site of the Winchester Legion, and the Lannin Block (north side of Main Street West). After Ross' death in 1935, the paper was operated by his widow, Blanche Gardner Ross, and his stepson, William Agnew. In 1943, it was taken over by William Fernland "Fern" Workman, who had worked at the Press since 1918 and served as editor since 1939. The Press moved to a new office in October 1951 on the north-east corner of St. Lawrence and Clarence Streets, where it would remain until 2020. Following Fern's death on March 30, 1957, his sons Reginald and Ronald became co-owners. They sold the newspaper in August 1981 to John and Robin Morris, who co-owned 2woMor Publications Inc. Robin eventually left to create his own company, leaving John as the sole owner. John Morris died on June 5, 2004 and ownership of the Press then transferred to Morris' wife, Beth, who owned it until the newspaper's closure in January 2020. The last edition was published on January 1, 2020.
- Chesterville Record (1894–present). The Chesterville Record is a weekly newspaper that was founded by Robert L. Harrop, the Chesterville station master. It was first published on December 12, 1894, and Thomas T. Shaw purchased the newspaper the following year. The Record office burned in the Great Fire of 1909 and was given a new home in 1910 when an office was built on King Street, where the business remained until 2018. T. T. Shaw sold the Record to George C. Lacey in 1915, who owned it until 1950. Lacey's daughter Helen, along with her husband Keith Graham, then became the co-publishers until they sold the newspaper to Blake Feeley and Wayne LaPrade in 1969. In 1976, the Record was sold to 2woMor Publications Inc., co-owned by brothers John and Robin Morris. Robin Morris eventually split from the St. Lawrence Printing Company and established Etcetera Publications, under which he continued to publish the Chesterville Record. Robin Morris acted as editor of the Record for many years until his death on December 9, 2014. In August 2018, the newspaper was purchased by Linda Vogel, AJ Al-Rajab, and Donald Good. In June of that year, the business moved to 29 King Street and in December, the long-time office at 7 King Street was demolished.
- Eastern Ontario Agri-News (1978–present). Eastern Ontario Agri-News is a monthly tabloid published by Etcetera Publications (owner of the Chesterville Record). It was first published in late February 1978 by John and Robin Morris, who at the time were co-owners of 2woMor Publications Inc. When Robin Morris broke off from the company and established Etcetera Publications, he continued to publish Agri-News.
- Nation Valley News (2016–present). Nation Valley News is an all-digital news and advertising company founded and operated by Nelson Zandbergen.

== Notable people ==
- John (Jack) Wesley Ault, founder of Ault Foods, now known as Lactalis Canada, in Winchester. Lactalis is a major employer in North Dundas and processes much of the milk of dairy farmers in the area.
- Lorne W. R. Mulloy (1876–1932), Military hero in the Boer War, professor at the Royal Military College of Canada, and lawyer. He was born on a farm near Winchester and Chesterville.
- Hudson Allison (1881–1912), Montreal stock-broker and victim of the Titanic disaster. He was born in Chesterville in 1881 and worked as a clerk in Chester Casselman's general store. His wife, Bess Waldo Daniels, and their daughter, Helen "Lorainne", also perished in the sinking. Their infant son, Hudson "Trevor" Allison, survived the sinking. Hudson's body was recovered by the Mackay-Bennett and interred at Maple Ridge Cemetery, Chesterville.
- Larry Robinson, Stanley Cup winner and Hockey Hall of Fame member, was born in Winchester in 1951.
- George Beverly "Bev" Shea (1909–2013) was born on February 1, 1909, in Winchester. He is a Grammy Award-winning gospel singer and hymn composer. Shea has often been described as "America's beloved Gospel singer" and is considered "the first international singing 'star' of the gospel world" as a consequence of his solos at Billy Graham Crusades and his exposure on radio, records, and television. According to the Guinness Book of Records Shea holds the world record for singing in person to the most people ever, with an estimated cumulative live audience of 220 million people.
- Dewey Martin of the rock band Buffalo Springfield was born in Chesterville in 1940.
- Matt Carkner, a former professional hockey player who played for the National Hockey League (NHL)'s Ottawa Senators, San Jose Sharks and New York Islanders and scored one of the greatest goals in Ottawa Senators history, a triple overtime winner in the 2010 playoffs vs the Pittsburgh Penguins
- Slater Koekkoek, a professional hockey player who grew up in the Township and was born in Winchester, was selected tenth overall by Tampa Bay Lightning during the 2012 NHL entry draft. He currently plays for the Edmonton Oilers and made his NHL debut on March 31, 2015, against the Toronto Maple Leafs.

=== Politicians ===
- Andrew Broder (1845–1918), MPP for Dundas (1875–1886), MP for Dundas (1896–1917). He was a long-time merchant in Winchester. His store was located on the south-west corner of Main and St. Lawrence Streets, the current site of Sweet Corner Park. He was the uncle of Aaron Sweet.
- Jacob Erratt (1847–1928), 18th mayor of the city of Ottawa from 1889 to 1890.
- Aaron Sweet (1854–1937), MPP for Dundas (1923–1926). In 1888, he served as the first Reeve of the newly incorporated village of Winchester. He was a merchant in Winchester for many years. His store, formerly located on the south-west corner of Main and St. Lawrence Streets, was previously owned by his uncle, Andrew Broder. Sweet Corner Park, which now occupies the space where the store was, was named in his honour.
- Alexander Cameron Rutherford (1857–1941), first Premier of Alberta, MLA for Strathcona was born in Ormond.
- Orren D. Casselman (1861–1950), MP for Dundas (1917–1921), was born in Chesterville. He was the half-brother of William H. Casselman.
- William H. Casselman (1868–1941), MPP for Dundas (1919–1923). He was born in Chesterville and served as Reeve from 1931 until his death. He was the half-brother of Orren D. Casselman.
- Preston Elliott (1876–1939), MP for Dundas (1921–1925), was born in Chesterville.
- George Holmes Challies (1884–1976), MPP for Dundas (1929–1934) and Grenville-Dundas (1934–1955), was born in Winchester. He was active in the establishment of the Winchester District Memorial Hospital.
- Frederick McIntosh Cass (1913–2000), MPP for Grenville-Dundas (1955–1971), Minister of Highways (1959–1961), Minister of Municipal Affairs (1961–1962), Attorney-General of Ontario (1962–1964), and Speaker of the Legislative Assembly of Ontario (1968–1971), was born in Chesterville.
- Eric Duncan (born 1987), MP for Stormont-Dundas-South Glengarry (2019–present), was born in North Dundas. He served as the mayor of North Dundas from 2010 to 2018.

== See also ==
- Winchester District Memorial Hospital
- List of townships in Ontario
- List of francophone communities in Ontario
