= Andrew Broder =

Canadian politician

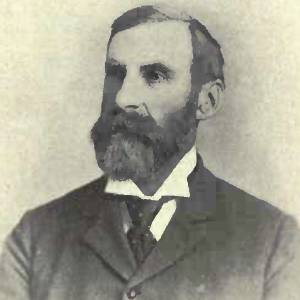

Member of Parliament for Dundas
- In office 1896–1917
- Preceded by: Hugo Homer Ross
- Succeeded by: Orren D. Casselman

Ontario MPP
- In office 1875–1886
- Preceded by: Simon S. Cook
- Succeeded by: Theodore F. Chamberlain
- Constituency: Dundas

Personal details
- Born: April 16, 1845 Franklin, Huntingdon County, Canada East
- Died: January 4, 1918 (aged 72) Morrisburg, Ontario
- Party: Conservative
- Spouse: Caroline Summers (1860-1895)
- Children: 4
- Occupation: Merchant

Military service
- Allegiance: Canada
- Branch/service: Canadian militia
- Years of service: 1866
- Rank: Private
- Unit: Franklin Infantry Company
- Battles/wars: Fenian Raids

Andrew Broder (April 16, 1845 – January 4, 1918) was an Ontario farmer, merchant and political figure. He represented Dundas in the Legislative Assembly of Ontario from 1875 to 1886, and then served in the House of Commons of Canada as Member of Parliament for the Dundas (federal electoral district) from 1896 to 1917, both as a Conservative member.

He was born in Franklin, Huntingdon County, Canada East in 1845, the son of Irish immigrants. He was educated at academies in Huntington and nearby Malone, New York. Broder served in the Franklin Infantry Company during the time of the Fenian raids. He settled at West Winchester, Ontario in 1868 and set up in business there and was involved in the community.

In January 1875, the same month West Winchester became Winchester, he defeated incumbent Simon S. Cook in the 1875 Ontario general election, but under 100 votes. The vote (as well as another 22 of the 88 ridings) was appealed but he was reelected in the by-election that followed (without Mr. Cook on the ballot) that September, and he represented Dundas in the provincial assembly for eleven years, being re-elected in 1879, and 1883 with margins of victory of 83 and 152 votes, respectively.

At the end of 1886, he lost the riding by 25 votes to his 1879 rival Theodore F. Chamberlain, who had served as mayor of Morrisburg, Ontario, and was an unsuccessful federal candidate in the 1882 Canadian federal election, (losing to Charles Erastus Hickey); in 1904, Chamberlain would challenge Brodner once again; that time at the federal level. The 25 vote margin was challenged, Chamberlain was unseated in March 1887, and the by-election not held into early 1888. Brodner was not the Conservative candidate this time; Sir James Plimey Whitney won the by-election, and was the incumbent until his death in 1914, by that time, assuming the role of Leader of the Opposition in 1896, and after 1905, the 6th Premier of Ontario, and Knighted by King George V.

Broder was a customs agent at nearby Morrisburg from 1892 to 1896, resigning this post to run for the seat in the House of Commons. He married Caroline Summers in 1884, and his son Fred later became customs collector at Morrisburg. Sadly, Mrs Broder died in childbirth in 1895. The family is buried at Fairview Cemetery in Mariatown, near Morrisburg.

The following year, he was elected to the House of Commons of Canada in the 1896 Canadian federal election for the Dundas (federal electoral district), succeeding Hugo Homer Ross for the party nomination. He was re-elected in 1900, 1904, 1908, and in 1911, his only tenure on the Government side. In 1917, he declined to run for re-election, and was replaced in the election by Orren D. Casselman under the Unionist banner. His death occurred 18 days after the election.

He was the maternal uncle of Aaron Sweet, who also served as MPP for Dundas, from 1923-26, following the lengthy tenure of Sir James P. Whitney (1888-1914).

== Electoral history ==
1875 Ontario general election: Dundas
Party	Candidate	Votes	%	±%
Conservative	Andrew Broder	1,458	51.67	+7.75
Liberal	Simon S. Cook	1,364	48.33	−7.75
Turnout		2,822	74.99	−1.29
Eligible voters		3,763		
Election voided
Source: Elections Ontario

Ontario provincial by-election, September 1875: Dundas Previous election voided
Party	Candidate	Votes	%	±%
Conservative	Andrew Broder	1,505	54.16	+10.24
Independent	Mr. Rose	1,274	45.84	
Total valid votes		2,779		
Conservative gain from Liberal		Swing		+10.24
Source: History of the Electoral Districts, Legislatures and Ministries of the Province of Ontario

1879 Ontario general election: Dundas
Party	Candidate	Votes	%	±%
Conservative	Andrew Broder	1,674	51.24	−2.92
Liberal	Theodore F. Chamberlain	1,593	48.76	
Total valid votes		3,267	77.29	
Eligible voters		4,227		
Conservative hold		Swing		−2.92
Source: Elections Ontario
