= William Gibson (Dundas County, Ontario politician) =

Canadian politician

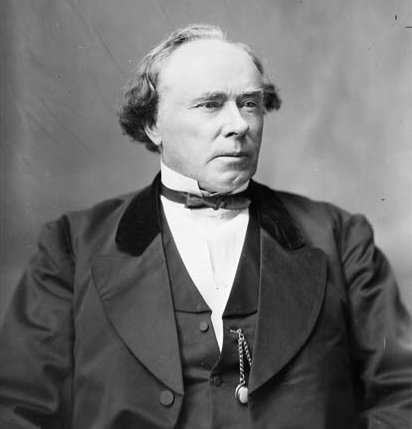

Member of the Canadian Parliament for Dundas
- In office 1872–1878
- Preceded by: John Sylvester Ross
- Succeeded by: John Sylvester Ross

Personal details
- Born: September 11, 1815 Dumfriesshire, Scotland
- Died: February 7, 1900 (aged 84) Morrisburg, Ontario
- Party: Independent Liberal
- Spouse: Eliza Kennedy m 1844, Jane Gillespie m 1854.
- Children: 6.

William Gibson (September 11, 1815 – February 7, 1890) was a Canadian politician.

Born in Dumfriesshire, Scotland and educated in Scotland, Gibson came to British North America in 1839 and first settled at Burrit's Rapids where he operated a flour mill. He then moved to Spencerville where he built and operated another mill. In 1827, he settled in Morrisburg, where he purchased a mill from Benjamin Chaffey and later built another mill. He was also a director of the Ottawa Agricultural Fire Insurance Company. Miller served on the town council for Morrisburg. He was elected to the House of Commons of Canada in 1872 as an Independent Liberal defeating incumbent John Sylvester Ross in a two candidate contest. Ross who was a member of John A. Macdonald's Liberal-Conservative faction. Gibson was re-elected in 1874 representing Dundas electoral district. He retired from office at the subsequent election.

Gibson was married twice: to Eliza Kennedy (1828–1852) in 1843 and to Jane Gillespie (1834–1867) in 1854. A granddaughter, Jean Kennedy Gibson (1885-1929), from his son Matthew (1844-1915), was wife of George Holmes Challies. MPP for Dundas and Grenville-Dundas from 1929-1955.
