= Hugo Homer Ross =

Canadian politician

Hugo Homer Ross (August 11, 1847 – July 11, 1913) was an educator, merchant and political figure in Ontario, Canada. He represented Dundas in the House of Commons of Canada from 1891 to 1896 as a Conservative member. His name also appears as Homer Hugo Ross.

He was born in Iroquois, Canada West, the son of John Sylvester Ross and Charlotte Carman, and educated at the University of Toronto. He was headmaster for high schools in Gananoque and Perth.

In 1880, he was appointed Captain in command of No. 8 (Iroquois) Company, Dundas Division of Reserve Militia.

He then entered the hardware business in Iroquois with his brother Allan J. Ross. Ross served three years on the municipal council for Iroquois. He married Mary M. Redmond. Ross died in Brockville.

Parliament of Canada
Preceded by Charles Erastus Hickey	Member of Parliament for Dundas; 1891–1896	Succeeded by Andrew Broder
