= John Sylvester Ross =

Canadian politician

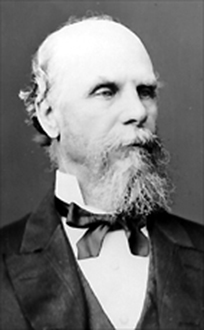

Member of the Legislative Assembly for Dundas
- In office 1861–1866
- Preceded by: James William Cook
- Succeeded by: Position terminated

Member of Parliament for Dundas
- In office 1867–1872
- Preceded by: Position established
- Succeeded by: William Gibson

Member of Parliament for Dundas
- In office 1879–1882
- Preceded by: William Gibson
- Succeeded by: Charles Erastus Hickey

Personal details
- Born: June 16, 1821 Osnabruck Township
- Died: June 1, 1882 (aged 60) Iroquois, Ontario
- Party: Conservative
- Spouse: Charlotte Carman
- Children: Hugo Homer Ross
- Occupation: Miller, politician, merchant

Military service
- Allegiance: Canadian Militia
- Branch/service: Volunteer Militia Foot Artillery Company of Iroquois
- Rank: Captain
- Battles/wars: Trent Affair (1862)

John Sylvester Ross (July 16, 1821 – July 1, 1882) was a miller and political figure in Ontario. He was a Liberal-Conservative member of the House of Commons of Canada who represented Dundas from 1867 to 1872 and from 1879 to 1882.

He was born in Osnabruck Township Upper Canada in 1821, the son of Michael Ross, and settled in the village of Iroquois where he set up a general store. He married Charlotte Carman, the granddaughter of Peter Shaver, in 1845. Ross served on the council for Matilda Township and was reeve in 1856. In 1861, he was elected to the Legislative Assembly of the Province of Canada representing Dundas; he was reelected in 1863. He was president of the Iroquois Milling Company. Ross was also secretary-treasurer and president for the High School Board. He died in Iroquois at the age of 61.

His son Hugo also represented Dundas in the House of Commons.
