= Irwin Foster Hilliard =

Canadian politician

Ontario MPP
- In office 1914–1919
- Preceded by: James Whitney
- Succeeded by: William H. Casselman
- Constituency: Dundas

Personal details
- Born: February 2, 1863 Osnabruck Township, Canada West
- Died: November 23, 1948 (aged 85) (Note: Disappeared on November 23, 1948, presumed drowned. Body recovered from Lake Ontario on December 22, 1948.) Lambton, Toronto, Ontario
- Resting place: Fairview (Hanes) Cemetery, South Dundas, Ontario
- Party: Conservative
- Spouse: Anna Caroline McAmmond (m. 1893)
- Children: 3
- Occupation: Lawyer

Irwin Foster Hilliard (February 2, 1863 – November/December 1948) was an Ontario lawyer and political figure. He represented Dundas in the Legislative Assembly of Ontario from 1914 to 1919 as a Conservative member.

== Background ==
He was born in Osnabruck Township, Canada West, the son of Thomas Foster Hilliard, and was educated in Morrisburg. He articled in law in the office of James Pliny Whitney and was called to the bar in 1885. Hilliard set up practice in Iroquois and then Morrisburg. In 1893, he married Anna Caroline McAmmond. He served on the Board of Education and the village council. In 1910, he was named King's Counsel. He was elected in a 1914 by-election held after the death of J.P. Whitney and was defeated in the 1919 general election. He was Master in Chambers at Osgoode Hall until he returned to practice in Morrisburg in 1935. In 1945, he retired from his practice and moved to Toronto.

On November 23, 1948, Hilliard went missing from his Toronto home after he left his home on a shopping trip. At the time it was believed that he may have drowned in Lake Ontario. His body was recovered on December 22, 1948, near Lambton. He was 85. His grave can be found at Fairview (Hanes) Cemetery.

== See also ==
- List of solved missing person cases
- List of unsolved deaths
