= George Smyth (Canadian politician) =

Canadian politician

Ontario MPP
- In office 1926–1929
- Preceded by: Aaron Sweet
- Succeeded by: George Holmes Challies
- Constituency: Dundas

Personal details
- Born: November 1, 1864 Matilda Township, Canada West
- Died: 1938 (aged 73–74)
- Party: Liberal-Prohibitionist
- Spouse: Mary Dickey (m. 1900)
- Occupation: Farmer

George Smyth (November 1, 1864 – 1938) was an Ontario farmer and political figure. He was elected in the 1926 provincial election representing Dundas in the Legislative Assembly of Ontario as a Liberal-Prohibitionist member and sat until 1929. The 1926 election was largely fought on the Conservative government's proposal to repeal the Ontario Temperance Act.

He was born in Matilda Township, Canada West, the son of Oliver Smyth. He was educated in Morrisburg. In 1900, he married Mary Dickey, the daughter of a former county warden. Smyth served as reeve for Matilda from 1922 to 1924 and was warden for the United Counties of Stormont, Dundas and Glengarry in 1924.
