= Simon S. Cook =

Canadian politician

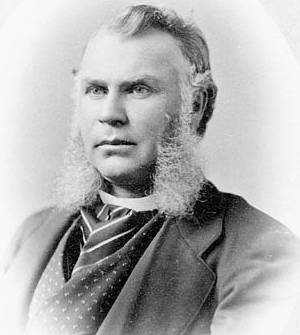

Ontario MPP
- In office 1867–1874
- Preceded by: Riding established
- Succeeded by: Andrew Broder
- Constituency: Dundas

Personal details
- Born: September 15, 1831 Williamsburgh, Dundas County, Upper Canada
- Died: May 15, 1892 (aged 60) Merchant
- Party: Liberal
- Relations: James William, brother Hermon Henry, brother

Simon Sephrenus Cook (September 15, 1831 – May 15, 1892) represented Dundas in the Legislative Assembly of Ontario as a Liberal member from 1867 to 1874.

He was born in Williamsburgh in Dundas County in Upper Canada in 1831 and educated at the Potsdam Academy in Potsdam, New York. He lived in Morrisburg and was involved in the timber trade. In 1881, he was appointed registrar for the county. His brother James William represented Dundas in the Legislative Assembly of the Province of Canada and his brother Hermon Henry served in both the federal and provincial legislatures.

== Electoral history ==
1867 Ontario general election: Dundas
Party	Candidate	Votes	%
Liberal	Simon S. Cook	1,162	53.57
Conservative	Mr. Doran	1,007	46.43
Total valid votes		2,169	79.42
Eligible voters		2,731	
Liberal pickup new district.			
Source: Elections Ontario

1871 Ontario general election: Dundas
Party	Candidate	Votes	%	±%
Liberal	Simon S. Cook	1,216	56.09	+2.52
Conservative	Mr. McDonald	952	43.91	−2.52
Turnout		2,168	76.28	−3.14
Eligible voters		2,842		
Liberal hold		Swing		+2.52
Source: Elections Ontario

1875 Ontario general election: Dundas
Party	Candidate	Votes	%	±%
Conservative	Andrew Broder	1,458	51.67	+7.75
Liberal	Simon S. Cook	1,364	48.33	−7.75
Turnout		2,822	74.99	−1.29
Eligible voters		3,763		
Election voided
Source: Elections Ontario
