= Simon Cook =

Simon Cook may refer to:

- Simon Cook (English cricketer) (born 1977), English cricketer
- Simon Cook (Australian cricketer) (born 1972), Australian cricketer
- Simon S. Cook (1831–1892), Canadian lumber merchant and political figure
- Simon Cook (actor), British actor and politician

== See also ==
- Simon Cooke, New Zealand sailor
