= Aaron Sweet =

Canadian politician

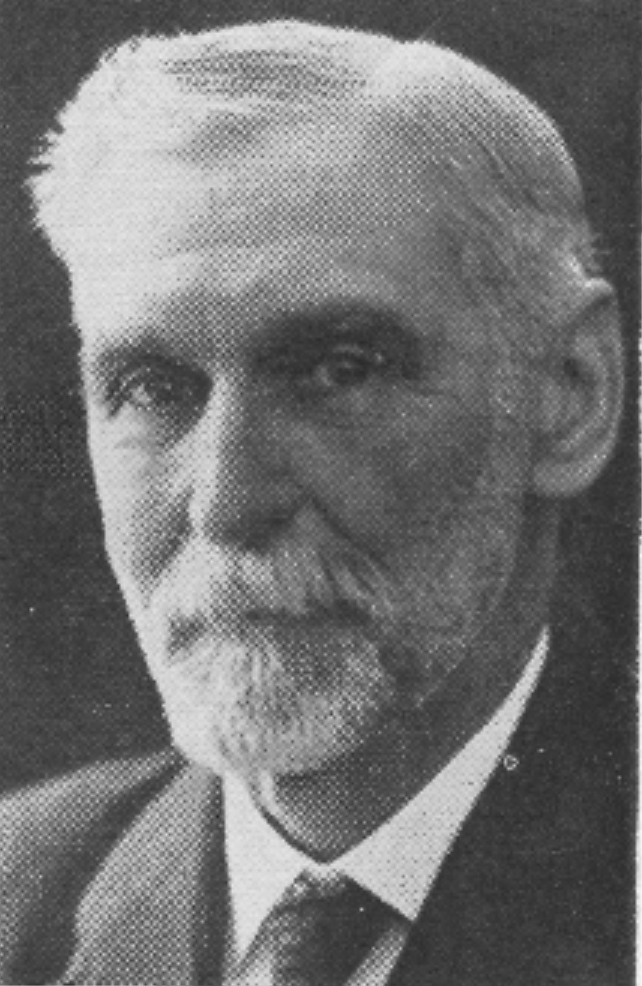

Ontario MPP
- In office 1923–1926
- Preceded by: William H. Casselman
- Succeeded by: George Smyth
- Constituency: Dundas

Personal details
- Born: February 12, 1854 Hemmingford, Canada East
- Died: January 8, 1937 (aged 82)
- Party: Conservative
- Spouse: Mary Esther Boyd (m. 1881)
- Occupation: Merchant

Aaron Sweet (February 12, 1854 – January 8, 1937) was an Ontario merchant and political figure. He represented Dundas in the Legislative Assembly of Ontario as a Conservative member from 1923 to 1926.

He was born in Hemmingford, Canada East, the son of Richard Sweet and Eleanor Broder (sister of Andrew Broder). Sweet was educated in Morrisburg. Sweet moved to Winchester as a young man to live with his uncle, who had opened a general store there in 1868. On October 11, 1881, Sweet married Mary Esther Boyd, daughter of Abraham and Mary Boyd. Their only child was their daughter Mabel Sweet, born December 20, 1882.

Sweet was an active member of the community for many years. He was the first Reeve of Winchester, serving in 1888, and was later a councillor from 1908 to 1909. He succeeded his uncle in running the general store, which he continued to do up until his death. The store continued to run until it burned down in the early 1980s, having been managed by a number of different people. Sweet was also a director of the Beach Foundry Company, and served as treasurer for the Winchester Public Library from 1905 to 1909.

Sweet Corner Park, located at the corner of St. Lawrence and Main Streets in Winchester (the former site of the store) was named after Sweet.
