= James Whitney (politician) =

Canadian politician (1843–1914)

The Honourable Sir James Whitney KCMG KC
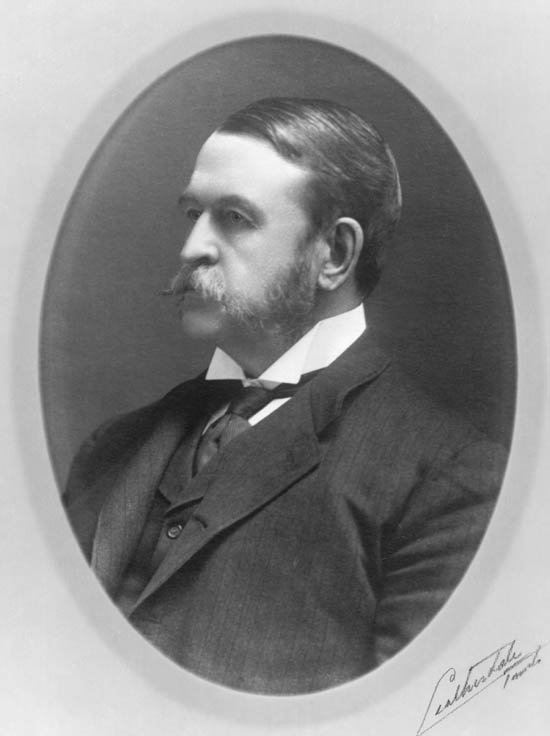
- Whitney in 1905

6th Premier of Ontario
- In office February 8, 1905 – September 25, 1914
- Monarchs: Edward VII; George V
- Lieutenant Governor: William Mortimer Clark; John Morison Gibson; John Strathearn Hendrie
- Preceded by: George William Ross
- Succeeded by: William Howard Hearst

Member of the Legislative Assembly
- In office January 31, 1888 – September 25, 1914
- Preceded by: Theodore F. Chamberlain
- Succeeded by: Irwin Foster Hilliard
- Constituency: Dundas

Personal details
- Born: James Pliny Whitney; October 2, 1843 Williamsburgh Township, Canada West
- Died: September 25, 1914 (aged 70) Toronto, Ontario
- Resting place: Holy Trinity Anglican Cemetery, Morrisburg, Ontario
- Party: Ontario Conservative Party
- Spouse(s): Alice Park (1846-1921), m 1877.
- Awards: Canada General Service Medal

Military service
- Allegiance: Canadian Militia
- Branch/service: Cornwall Volunteer Infantry; No. 7 Company, Dundas Reserve Militia
- Rank: Sergeant; Captain; Lieutenant-Colonel
- Battles/wars: Trent Affair (1862); Fenian Raids (1866)

Sir James Pliny Whitney KCMG KC (October 2, 1843 – September 25, 1914) was a Canadian politician and lawyer in the province of Ontario. He served as Conservative member of the legislature for Dundas in Eastern Ontario from 1888 and as the sixth premier of Ontario from 1905 until his death in 1914. He is the only premier of Ontario to have died while in office.

== Early life and education ==
Whitney was born in Williamsburgh Township, Canada West, on October 2, 1843, and attended Cornwall Grammar School before articling at the law office of John Sandfield Macdonald in the 1860s, but did not resume his legal studies until 1871. He was called to the bar in 1875, and practised law in Morrisburg.

Whitney was active in the militia at Cornwall, serving as a private in a volunteer company during the Trent Affair and then a sergeant with the Cornwall Volunteer Infantry during the Fenian Raids. He continued to serve in the militia, being appointed Captain of No. 7 (Morrisburg) Company of the Dundas Reserve Militia in 1880. He was promoted to major in 1885, and eventually promoted to lieutenant colonel in command in 1889, an appointment he held until his death.

== Early political career ==
Whitney was elected to the Ontario legislature in a January 31, 1888, by-election in the riding of Dundas, defeating incumbent Theodore F. Chamberlain, following a challenge of his 1886 Ontario general election victory over Andrew Broder by 25 votes, resulting in the pending by-election. Following re-election in both 1890, and 1894, he became leader of Ontario's Conservative Party in 1896, following a brief, and non-electoral tenure of George Frederick Marter. His mentor was former (to 1894) leader William Ralph Meredith, who deeply influenced many of Whitney's later measures as premier, such as workers' compensation and dealing with the University of Toronto, (ironically chancellor of that University 1900-1923), and appointed Chief Justice of Ontario by Premier Whitney in 1913. In 1898, Whitney's leadership saw an increase of 19 seats, but trailed Premier Arthur Sturgis Hardy by 9 seats (51-42); Hardy retired in 1899, and was replaced as premier by George William Ross, who narrowly won in 1902, that led to the 1905 election victory.

== Premiership ==
In the 1905 election, he led his party to victory for the first time in 33 years by defeating the tired Liberal government of George William Ross. It was a decisive majority, where 21 more caucus members were added, and grew after 1908 to plateau in 1911, and 1914, which was his final contest.

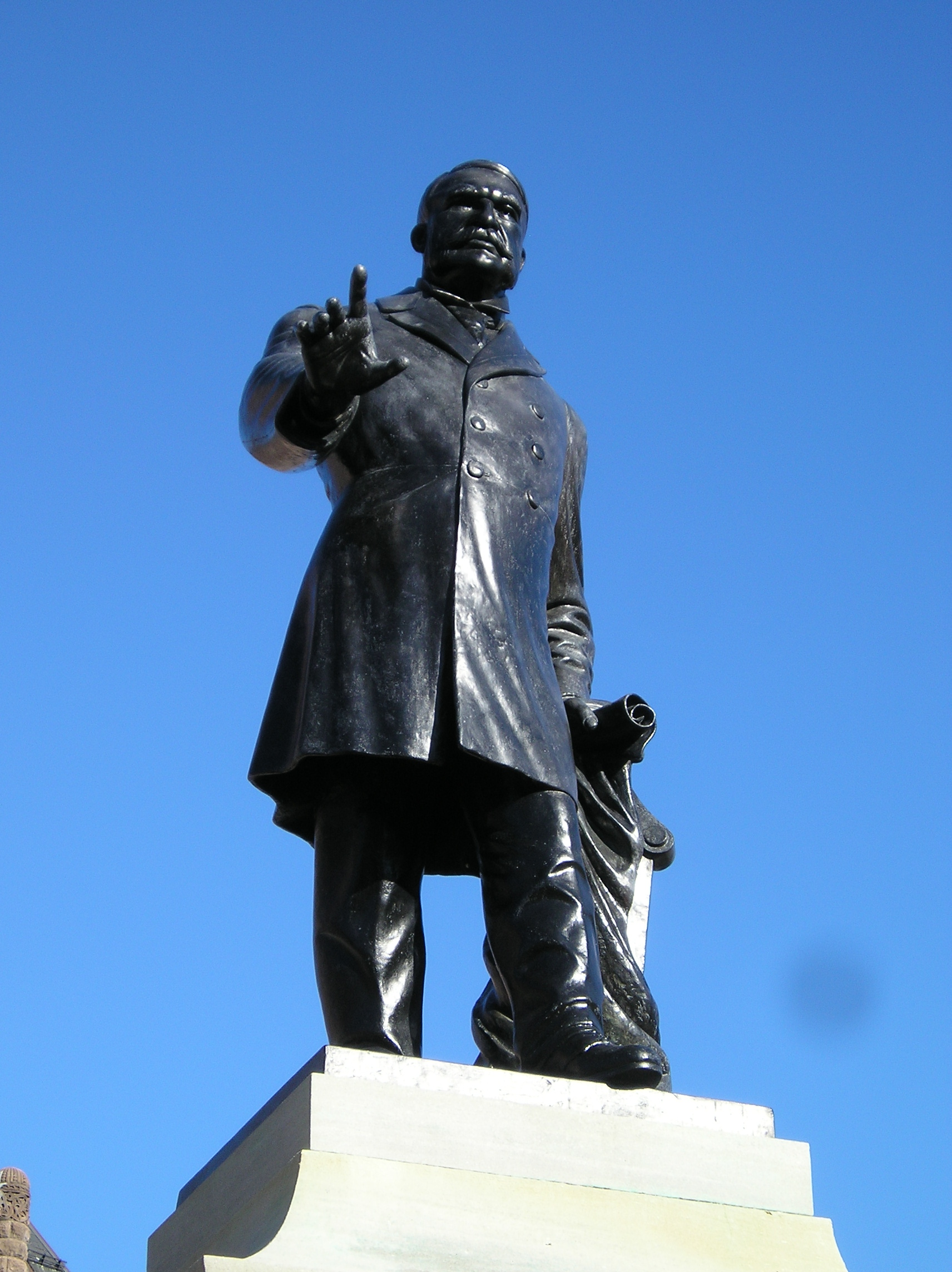
Statue of Sir James Whitney by Hamilton MacCarthy, Queen's Park, Toronto.

Whitney's government laid the basis for Ontario's industrial development by creating the Hydro-Electric Power Commission of Ontario, with Adam Beck as its chairman and driving force. His government created the Ontario Railway and Municipal Board in 1906 and also passed significant temperance and workmen's compensation legislation.

Early in his premiership, Whitney sought to remedy the troubled University of Toronto by improving its finances and finding a successor to its unpopular president James Loudon. According to his biographer, "The legislation for the University of Toronto has to be ranked as one of the major achievements of Whitney's entire period as Premier of Ontario. It provided the institution with a foundation for growth in the twentieth century and it represented a complete break with almost every aspect of Liberal policy towards the University of Toronto."

He also supported the anti-Catholic and anti-French-Canadian sentiments of supporters of the Orange Order in his caucus (such as George Howard Ferguson) by passing Regulation 17, which banned the teaching of French in schools beyond the first three years of school. The measure inflamed French-Canadian opinion across Canada, particularly in Quebec, and divided the country as it entered World War I.

== Death and legacy ==
Whitney died in office, on September 25, 1914, aged 70, shortly after he had won the 1914 election. Whitney had a suspected heart attack during his convalescence in New York City in 1913 and returned to Toronto staying at Toronto General Hospital.

A 1920s government building across from Queen's Park is named the Whitney Block after him. A statue of him stands on the Queen's Park grounds. Whitney Hall, a residential building at nearby University College, of the University of Toronto, is also named after him.
