= Orren D. Casselman =

Canadian politician

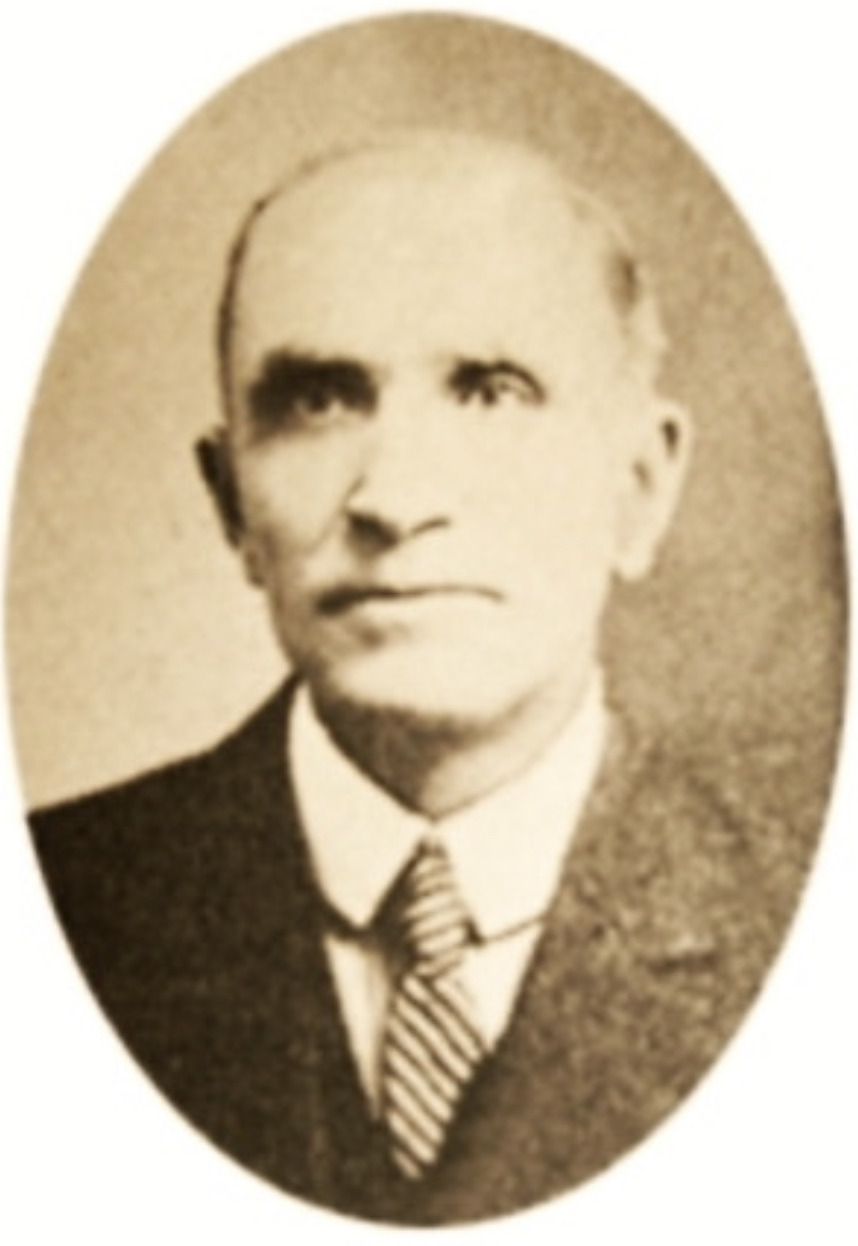

Member of Parliament for Dundas
- In office December 1917 – December 1921
- Preceded by: Andrew Broder
- Succeeded by: Preston Elliott

Personal details
- Born: November 3, 1861 Chesterville, Canada West
- Died: November 15, 1950 (aged 89) Chesterville, Ontario, Canada
- Party: Unionist Party
- Spouse(s): Mary Olive Sanders m 5 Sep 1905
- Profession: merchant

Military service
- Allegiance: Canada
- Branch/service: Canadian militia
- Years of service: 1914 - 1918
- Rank: Recruiting Officer
- Unit: No. 3 Military District
- Battles/wars: First World War

Orren D. Casselman (November 3, 1861 – November 15, 1950) was an Ontario merchant and political figure. He represented Dundas in the House of Commons of Canada from 1917 to 1921 as a Unionist member.

He was born in Chesterville, Canada West, the son of James C. Casselman, and was educated in Morrisburg and Hamilton. He taught school for two years before opening a general store in Chesterville. In 1905, he married Alin Sanders. Casselman was a recruiting officer and served overseas during World War I. He was defeated in the 1921 general election.

His half-brother William H. Casselman served in the Ontario provincial assembly.
