= Dundas (federal electoral district) =

Former federal electoral district in Ontario, Canada

Ontario electoral district

Defunct federal electoral district
- Legislature: House of Commons
- District created: 1867
- District abolished: 1924
- First contested: 1867
- Last contested: 1921

Dundas was a federal electoral district in Ontario, Canada, that was represented in the House of Commons of Canada from 1867 to 1925. It was created by the British North America Act 1867.

It consisted initially of Dundas County. In 1914, it was expanded to include the townships of Finch and Osnabruck, and the village of Finch from neighbouring Stormont County, which had previously been in the riding of Stormont.

The electoral district was abolished in 1924 when it was merged into Grenville—Dundas riding.

== Members of Parliament ==
This riding has elected the following members of Parliament:

Parliament	Years	Member	Party
1st	1867–1872	John Sylvester Ross	Liberal–Conservative
2nd	1872–1874	William Gibson	Independent Liberal
3rd	1874–1878	William Gibson	Independent Liberal
4th	1878–1882	John Sylvester Ross	Liberal–Conservative
5th	1882–1887	Charles Erastus Hickey	Conservative
6th	1887–1891	Charles Erastus Hickey	Conservative
7th	1891–1896	Hugo Homer Ross	Conservative
8th	1896–1900	Andrew Broder	Conservative
9th	1900–1904	Andrew Broder	Conservative
10th	1904–1908	Andrew Broder	Conservative
11th	1908–1911	Andrew Broder	Conservative
12th	1911–1917	Andrew Broder	Conservative
13th	1917–1921	Orren D. Casselman	Government (Unionist)
14th	1921–1925	Preston Elliott	Progressive
Riding dissolved into Grenville—Dundas

== Election results ==
1867 Canadian federal election
Party	Candidate	Votes
Liberal–Conservative	John Sylvester Ross	acclaimed
Source: Elections Canada

1872 Canadian federal election
Party	Candidate	Votes	%
Independent Liberal	William Gibson	1,350	51.7
Liberal–Conservative	John Sylvester Ross	1,262	48.3
Total valid votes		2,612	
Source: Elections Canada and Canada Elections Database

1874 Canadian federal election
Party	Candidate	Votes	%
Independent Liberal	William Gibson	1,389	51.3
Unknown	H. G. Merkley	1,316	48.7
Total valid votes		2,705	
Turnout (based on valid votes; total votes not available		2,705	82.55
Eligible voters		3,277	
Source: Elections Canada and Canada Elections Database

1878 Canadian federal election
Party	Candidate	Votes	%	±%
Liberal–Conservative	John Sylvester Ross	1,727	52.7	
Unknown	A. J. LaFlamme	1,548	47.3	
Total valid votes		3,275		
Total rejected ballots		58		
Turnout		3,333	82.19	+0.36
Eligible voters		4,055		
Source: Elections Canada and Canada Elections Database

1882 Canadian federal election
Party	Candidate	Votes	%
Conservative	Charles Erastus Hickey	1,719	51.3
Unknown	Theodore F. Chamberlain	1,630	48.7
Total valid votes		3,349	
Source: Elections Canada and Canada Elections Database

1887 Canadian federal election
Party	Candidate	Votes	%
Conservative	Charles E. Hickey	2,079	51.5
Liberal	Adam Johnston	1,960	48.5
Total valid votes		4,039	
Source: Elections Canada and Canada Elections Database

1891 Canadian federal election
Party	Candidate	Votes	%
Conservative	Hugo H. Ross	2,086	50.7
Liberal	Adam Johnston	2,026	49.3
Total valid votes		4,112	
Source: Elections Canada and Canada Elections Database

1896 Canadian federal election
Party	Candidate	Votes	%
Conservative	Andrew Broder	1,932	45.0
Liberal	Adam Johnston	1,870	43.5
McCarthyite	James P. Fox	494	11.5
Total valid votes		4,296	
Source: Elections Canada and Canada Elections Database

1900 Canadian federal election
Party	Candidate	Votes	%
Conservative	Andrew Broder	2,376	52.9
Liberal	Adam Johnston	2,118	47.1
Total valid votes		4,494	
Source: Elections Canada and Canada Elections Database

1904 Canadian federal election
Party	Candidate	Votes	%
Conservative	Andrew Broder	2,366	54.9
Liberal	Theodore F. Chamberlain	1,945	45.1
Total valid votes		4,311	
Total rejected ballots		49	
Turnout		4,360	81.54
Eligible voters		5,347	
Source: Elections Canada and Canada Elections Database

1908 Canadian federal election
Party	Candidate	Votes	%	±%
Conservative	Andrew Broder	2,308	55.5	
Liberal	Wesley Byron Lawson	1,848	44.5	
Total valid votes		4,156		
Total rejected ballots		29		
Turnout		4,185	78.18	-3.36
Eligible voters		5,353		
Source: Elections Canada and Canada Elections Database

1911 Canadian federal election
Party	Candidate	Votes	%
Conservative	Andrew Broder	2,262	58.3
Liberal	John Alexander Campbell	1,618	41.7
Total valid votes		3,880	
Source: Elections Canada and Canada Elections Database

1917 Canadian federal election
Party	Candidate	Votes	%
Government (Unionist)	Orren D. Casselman	4,236	61.2
Opposition (Laurier Liberals)	Alexander W. MacIntyre	2,806	39.8
Total valid votes		7,042	
Source: Elections Canada and Canada Elections Database

1921 Canadian federal election
Party	Candidate	Votes	%
Progressive	Preston Elliott	5,732	51.0
Conservative	Orren D. Casselman	5,499	49.0
Total valid votes		11,231	
Source: Elections Canada and Canada Elections Database

== See also ==
- List of Canadian electoral districts
- Historical federal electoral districts of Canada
