= Theodore F. Chamberlain =

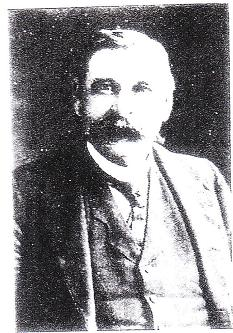

Ontario MPP
- In office 1886–1887
- Preceded by: Andrew Broder
- Succeeded by: James Whitney
- Constituency: Dundas

Personal details
- Born: July 6, 1838 Smith's Mills, Upper Canada
- Died: March 5, 1927 (aged 88) Chaffeys Locks, Ontario
- Party: Liberal
- Spouse: Annette Jane Parish (m. 1862)
- Occupation: Physician

Military service
- Allegiance: Upper Canada
- Branch/service: Canadian militia
- Years of service: 1866
- Rank: Lieutenant
- Unit: Dundas Infantry Company
- Battles/wars: Fenian Raids

Theodore F. Chamberlain (July 6, 1838 – March 5, 1927) was an Ontario physician, businessman and political figure. He represented Dundas in the Legislative Assembly of Ontario from 1886 to 1887 as a Liberal member.

== Early life and career ==
He was born in Smith's Mills, Upper Canada (later Harlem, Ontario) in 1838, the son of Dr. Asher Augustus Chamberlain who was also the local postmaster. Chamberlain studied dentistry in Ottawa and practiced in Leeds County and then in New York state. In 1858, he returned to Canada and studied medicine at Queen's College. Chamberlain received his medical degree in 1862 and set up practice in Morrisburg. He also ran a drug store and served as the village's officer of health and as coroner for Stormont, Dundas and Glengarry United Counties. He married Annette Jane Parish in 1862. Chamberlain was reeve for Morrisburg from 1877 to 1881 and warden for the United Counties in 1879. He served as a Lieutenant in the Dundas Infantry Company during the Fenian Raids. Chamberlain also was a master in the local masonic lodge and a supporter of temperance.

In partnership with his wife's brother, he owned three cheese factories. Chamberlain was also a director of the Parry Sound Lumber Company, owned by John Classon Miller, the husband of his sister Adelaide Augusta.

Chamberlain ran unsuccessfully for a seat in the provincial assembly in 1879 and for a federal seat in 1882. His election in 1886 was appealed and he lost the by-election that followed to James Pliny Whitney in 1888. In 1890, he was named inspector for prisons, hospitals and charities for Ontario, serving until 1904. He helped establish legislation which required each county to establish a poorhouse rather than using the local jail to house those without funds. In 1904, he ran unsuccessfully for a seat in the House of Commons. From 1906 to 1908, he was federal health inspector for public works.

In 1909, Chamberlain returned to his medical practice at Morrisburg. He died of pneumonia at Chaffeys Locks in 1927. His son Watson Parish also became a doctor and practised in Morrisburg.

The township of Chamberlain in Timiskaming District was named in his honour.

== Electoral history ==
1879 Ontario general election: Dundas
Party	Candidate	Votes	%	±%
Conservative	Andrew Broder	1,674	51.24	−2.92
Liberal	Theodore F. Chamberlain	1,593	48.76	
Total valid votes		3,267	77.29	
Eligible voters		4,227		
Conservative hold		Swing		−2.92
Source: Elections Ontario
