= Spencerville Fair =

Annual harvest celebration in Eastern Ontario

The Spencerville Fair, also known as "The Biggest-Little Fair in Eastern Ontario", is an annual celebration of harvest which unites the surrounding community of Spencerville, Ontario every second weekend in September. The first fair was held in December 1855 on the south side of the South Nation River. Today, the fair is held at the fair grounds in the middle of the village. These grounds contain a grandstand, race track, various show barns and a multimillion-dollar community building.

The Spencerville fair is a much-anticipated event attended by over 30,000 people annually. Attractions include the many rides and games, the Saturday parade, numerous exhibits, the giant pumpkin contest, teen and adult dances, cotton candy, bands, horse races, barbecues, midway, socials, and the fair Royalty Show, which consist of the Little Sir, Little Miss, Junior Ambassador and Ambassador competitions.

The Spencerville Agricultural Society organizes this event and is made up of numerous community volunteers. The hard work and dedication of these members, as well as the families and visitors who attend this event annually have allowed this fair to continue and prosper for 162 years.

== History ==
In 1854, the Leeds and Grenville County council passed a resolution granting the founding of agricultural societies within the two counties, one of which was the Township of Edwardsburg Agricultural Society (Now, Spencerville Agricultural Society). A year later, in 1855 the first fair was held on property settled by David Spencer. The following year, the fair changed locations to land donated to the society by David Spencer's daughter, Marcy Fairbairn.

According to the fair's website, which compiled its information from the local newspaper archives and the Grenville historical society, in 1877 a delegation from Toronto visited the fair to observe how the fair operated in regards to allotting prize money and the handling of exhibits. This helped lead to the founding of the Canadian National Exhibition in 1879.
