= Winchester District Memorial Hospital =

Coordinates: 45.0885°N 75.3532°W

Winchester District Memorial Hospital (WDMH) is a rural teaching hospital located in Winchester, Ontario. WDMH has a 24/7 emergency, childbirth centre and diagnostic imaging facilities including digital mammography and CT scans. It offers in-patient medical and surgical services, as well as day surgery and outpatient specialty clinics. WDMH is a hub site for cancer care, dialysis and cataract surgery. WDMH leads the Centre of Excellence for Rural Health and Education - a collaborative that brings together the hospital, local physicians, long-term care, and health and community services.

== Hospital Characteristics ==
- 23,125 emergency room visits
- 557 inpatient procedures
- 4,327 day surgery procedures
- 646 births
- 36,424 diagnostic imaging procedures
- 2,528 Ontario breast screening program patient
- 1,913 colonoscopies
- 1,911 chemotherapy visits
- 16,243 ambulatory care visits

== History ==
- 1948 - Winchester District Memorial Hospital officially opened on December 8, 1948. The two-storey building had 32 beds. In the first year, staff and physicians treated 1300 patients and delivered 245 babies.
- 1955 - A new administration wing was added at a cost of $36,000. In the same year, a blood bank was established.
- 1960 - The first major expansion was complete, going from 35 to 89 beds at a cost of $700,000. The new south wing included medical, surgical and maternity beds, more and larger operating rooms, x-ray and lab facilities, a new delivery suite, a cafeteria, a modern kitchen, new laundry and board rooms, a new nurses lounge and a pharmacy.
- 1964 - Funds from the Harvey S. Dillabough estate made possible the construction of a $140,000 nurses' residence.
- 1968 - A $1.6 million expansion included a 35-bed chronic care unit, relocation of the dietary unit, a boiler room and the addition of a 16-bed paediatric unit.
- 1972 - A new modern incinerator was built at a cost of $100,000.
- 1977 - $225,000 was spent to create a new x-ray room, family lounge, pharmacy and nursing office. The bed count had increased to 120 beds.
- 1980 - The Extended Care Unit expanded to four beds at a cost of $105,000.
- 1985 - A $600,000 project created a new lab, a renovated x-ray department and emergency and out-patient departments.
- 1992 - The HELP campaign raised funds for infrastructure changes such as ventilation systems, code upgrades and plumbing.
- 2009 - The new Winchester District Memorial Hospital was officially opened.
