= William H. Casselman =

Canadian politician (1868–1941)

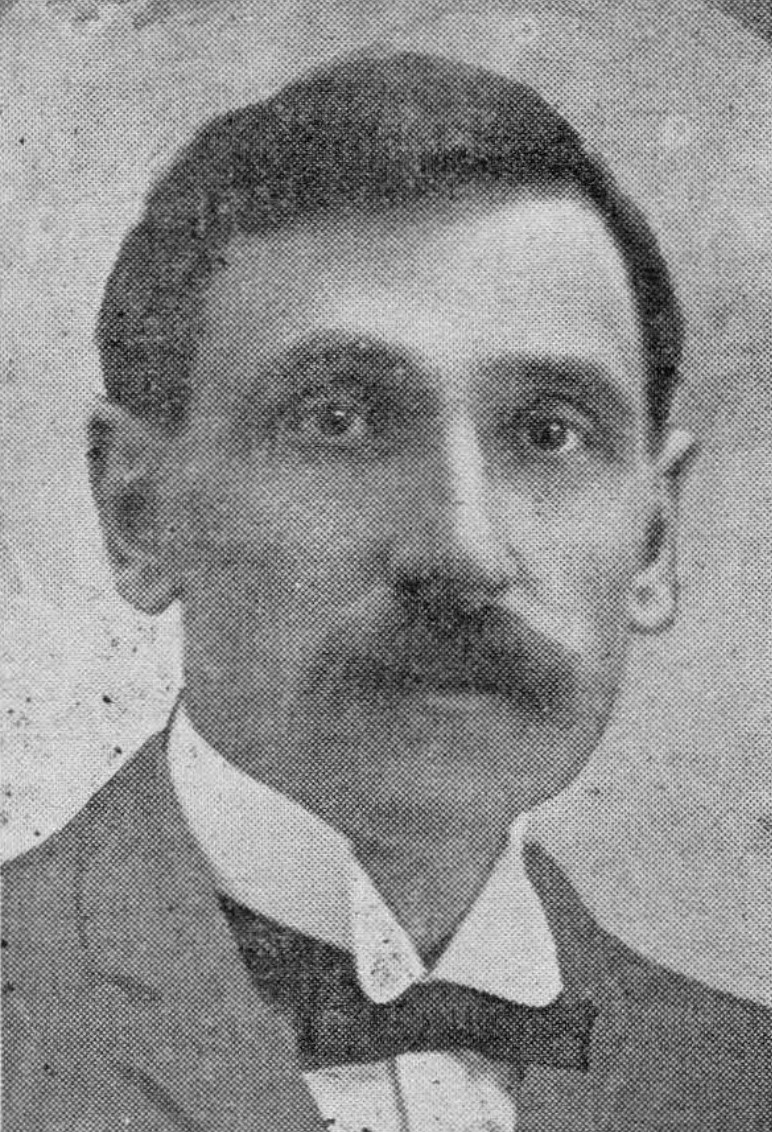

Ontario MPP
- In office 1919–1923
- Preceded by: Irwin Foster Hilliard
- Succeeded by: Aaron Sweet
- Constituency: Dundas

Personal details
- Born: July 26, 1868 Chesterville, Ontario
- Died: July 2, 1941 (aged 72–73) Chesterville, Ontario
- Party: United Farmers
- Spouse: Flora Carlyle (m. 1897)
- Relations: Orren D. Casselman, brother
- Occupation: Farmer

William H. Casselman (July 26, 1868 – July 2, 1941) was an Ontario farmer and political figure. He represented Dundas as a United Farmers of Ontario member from 1919 to 1923.

He was born in Chesterville, Ontario, the son of James C. Casselman, and was educated in Chesterville and Morrisburg. In 1897, he married Flora Carlyle. He was defeated in the 1923 general election by Aaron Sweet. From 1931 until his death, he served as Reeve of the Village of Chesterville. He died in an accident on the farm while unloading hay.

His half-brother Orren D. Casselman served in the House of Commons.
