= Spencerville, Ontario =

Spencerville
- Rural community
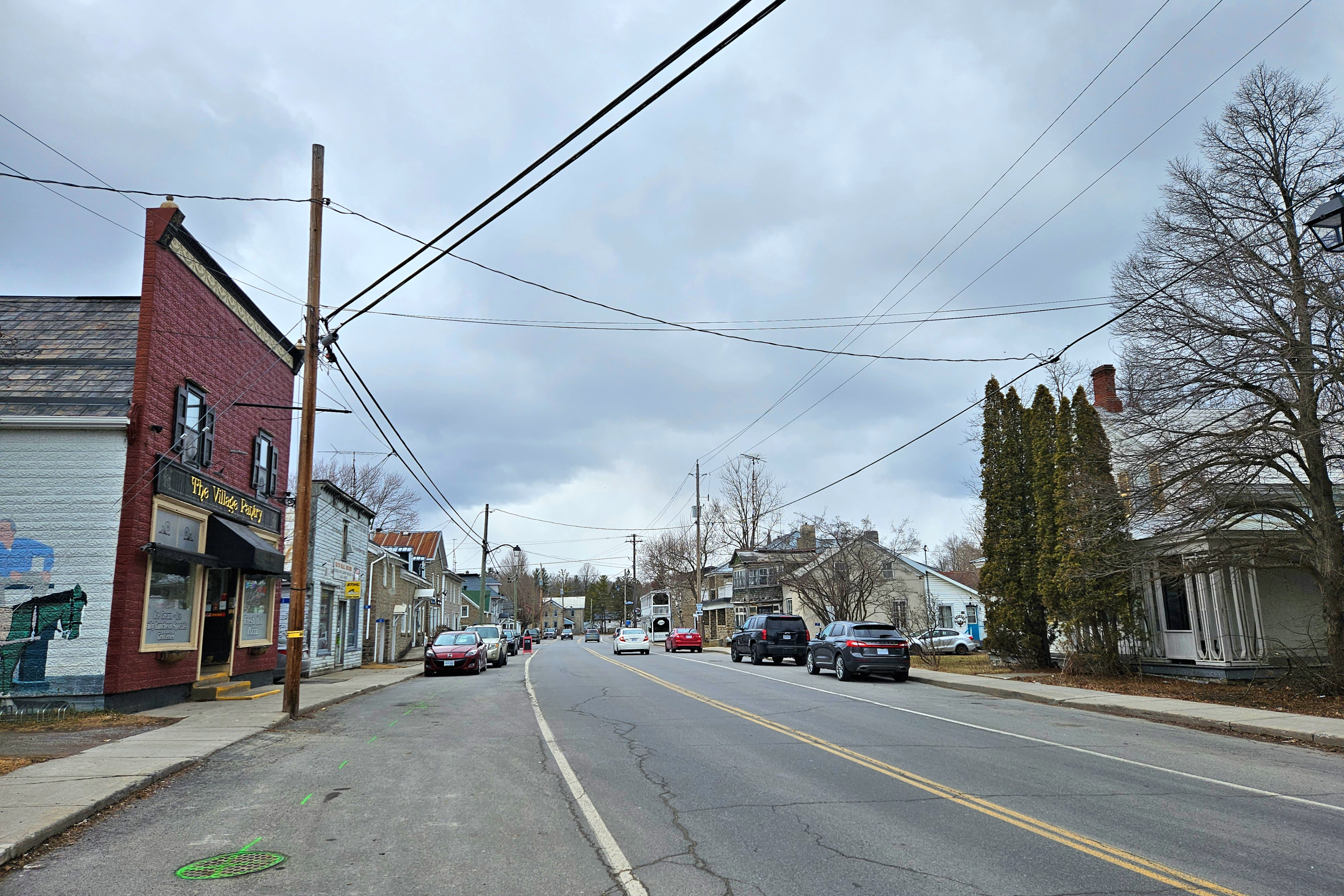
- Etymology: Named for David Spencer
- Location within United Counties of Leeds and Grenville Location within Southern Ontario
- Coordinates: 44°50′30″N 75°32′50″W
- Country: Canada
- Province: Ontario
- County: Leeds and Grenville
- Township: Edwardsburgh/Cardinal

Population (2021)
  - Total: 756
- Time zone: UTC-5 (Eastern (EST))
- Postal Code FSA: K0E
- Area codes: 613

Spencerville is a rural community located in Eastern Ontario, within Edwardsburgh/Cardinal township in the United Counties of Leeds and Grenville. The village lies about 80 kilometers south of downtown Ottawa on Highway 416. The South Nation River runs through the village.

David Spencer is the founder of the village and the village is named after him. Spencer's father built the first mill there in 1811 which inspired further settlement, and a village gradually grew surrounding the property.

Spencerville is a historical village with many old houses, churches, farms, cemeteries, and other buildings dating back to the 1800s. The most notable old structure is the Spencerville Mill, a stone gristmill on the site of the Spencer family's original mill.

The village is known for its annual fair held every September called the Spencerville Fair. The fair has been an annual community event since the 19th century.

== History ==
Spencerville was first settled at the start of the 1800s when a man named Peleg Spencer established a mill along the South Nation River in 1811, which a village subsequently grew around. By 1821, the Spencer family had constructed a sawmill and gristmill to replace the first mill, and in 1837 they constructed an inn and tavern called the Victoria Hotel. In 1831, David Spencer, the son of Peleg, became the owner of the mills and is generally credited as being the founder of the village.

By the 1850s, Spencerville had a population of around 250 individuals and numerous pioneer tradespeople and businesses were operating from the village as well as 2 churches, a school, and a post office. Mid-century, the village was home to three general stores, three shoemakers, three carriage shops, two inns, a cooperage, a tannery, a blacksmithing shop, as well as a carpenter, doctor, and tailor. The Spencer family had three mills in operation: a grist and oat mill, a sawmill, and a fulling and carding mill. In addition, an oat, grist, and sawmill operated on the outskirts of the village. In the 1850s, the Bytown and Prescott Railway was laid through the village, which led to the construction of a train station.

At the end of the 1800s, Spencerville's population had risen to 350 and several new businesses were established. A third church was constructed in the 1880s, and around the 1890s new businesses included a bakery, millinery, a harness shop, dressmaker, a pharmacy, and a cheese factory.

== Education and schools ==
Spencerville is currently home to one elementary school, Centennial '67 Public School. For secondary education, students in the area commute to high schools in nearby Kemptville or Prescott.

Spencerville was a designated school section by 1822, number fifteen in the township. The first school in the village was built in 1827 on land belonging to David Spencer and was known as S.S. #15. This school was replaced in 1849 by a one-room stone schoolhouse located northwest of Goodin Road and County Road 44. In 1872, S.S. #15 was replaced a third time by a two-room stone structure to compensate for overcrowding. A second floor was added in 1899 to serve the older students as a continuation school. Another addition was added in 1914 which allowed the school to house three elementary school classes downstairs and two continuation classes in the upper level. As overcrowding was still a concern, some elementary students attended classes in the old town hall until a fire destroyed the building in 1948. Continuation school classes ran until 1954 when students were transported to Prescott, Kemptville, or other nearby towns for high school. S.S. #15 remained open as an elementary school until 1967 when Centennial ’67 Public School opened in the village. The building was used for various commercial purposes before being converted into apartments in the 1990s. Centennial ’67 Public School was constructed in 1967 along Henderson Street, off of County Road 44. The rectangular, brick school has multiple classrooms and was a modern replacement for the one-room schoolhouses in the village and the surrounding area. The school is one of three active elementary schools located in the township of Edwardsburgh/Cardinal. Formerly, Centennial ‘67 served students in kindergarten and grades one through eight. Around 2008, the area school board made numerous changes to area schools, which included moving grades 7 and 8 from Centennial ’67 to South Grenville District High School. As of the 2009 school year, Centennial ’67 only serves students from kindergarten through to grade six.

== Churches ==
Spencerville is currently home to three active churches. Within the village, there is a Roman Catholic, Presbyterian, and a United Church; these churches are known as St. Laurence O’Toole, St. Andrew's Knox, and Spencerville United, respectively.

Prior to the construction of St. Laurence O’Toole Church, Spencerville's Roman Catholic congregation was served by the Prescott parish. In 1882, the congregation began planning the construction of their own church within the village. Construction began the following year, 1883, and by February 1884 the church was formally opened. A rectory and parish hall were built beside the church and in 1888, a burial ground was added. Although the rectory still stands, the parish hall was demolished in the 1980s. As of 2016, this church is still in use.

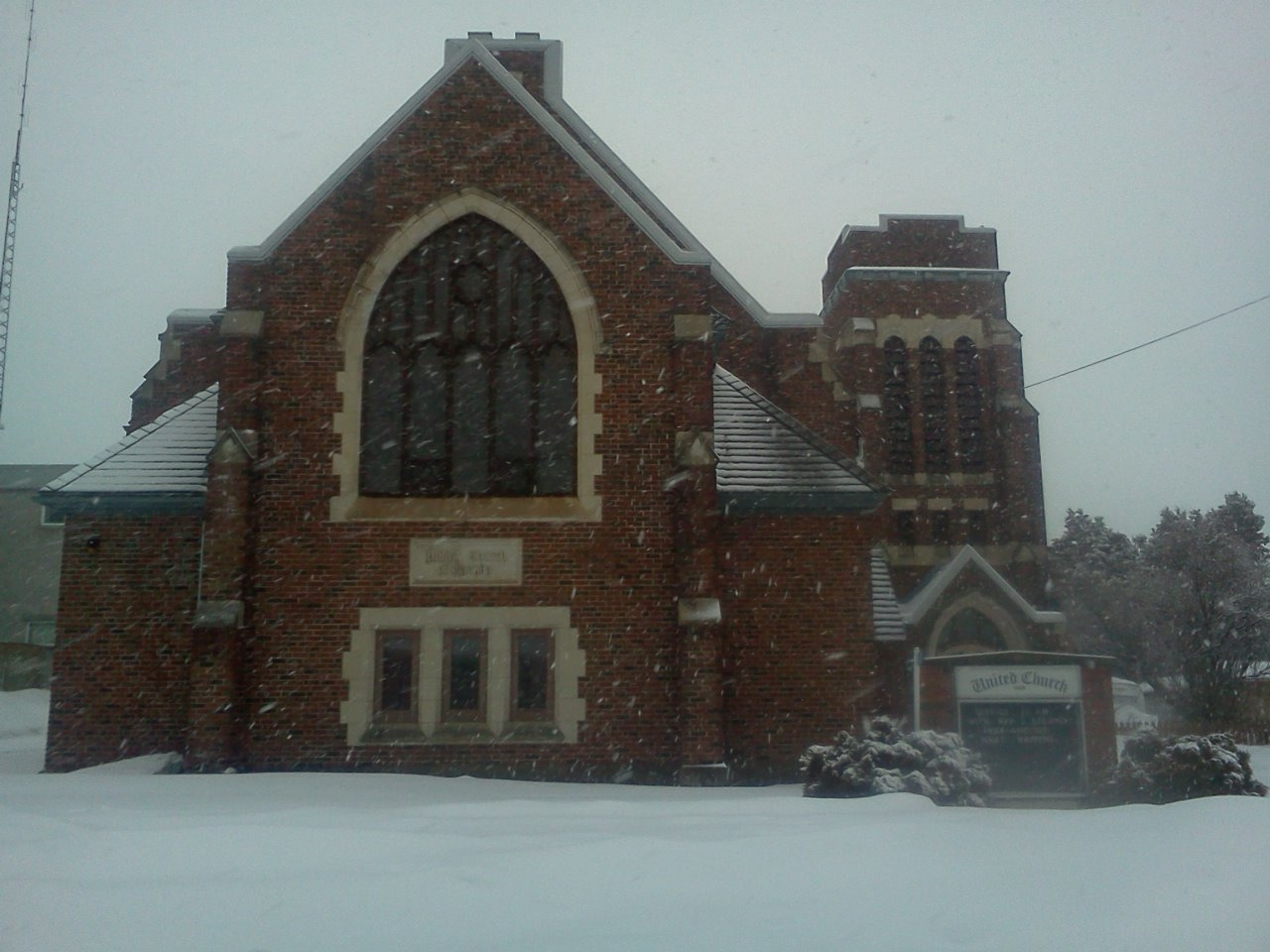
Spencerville United Church

The Spencerville United Church is a brick church located on Centre Street. Prior to becoming the Spencerville United Church, the Methodist church in Spencerville was a Wesleyan-Methodist church. The first Methodist church was located where the masonic lodge currently sits and was built around 1845 for the Wesleyan-Methodist congregation. In 1871, the church was relocated to the current site of the United Church, and the building replaced with construction finishing in 1872. In 1925, the congregation amalgamated with other Methodist denominations to become a United church. In 1929, the current church was constructed on the same site as the former church, which was demolished. As of 2016, this church is still in use.

St. Andrew's Presbyterian Church, also known as St. Andrew's Knox, is located along County Road 44 in the village. The current church structure is the fourth church building erected on that site. The church is accompanied by a cemetery. The first Presbyterian church was established in 1835 and was constructed of logs. This church was replaced two years later, in 1837, by a stone structure. The third church replaced the second in 1876 as the former church had become too small. The third church was built of cut stone and had a capacity of 450 individuals. The third church was gutted by fire in 1974, with only the exterior wall surviving. The fourth and current church was rebuilt two years after the fire within the original wall. A basement was added to the new building during construction and in 1977 the steeple was replaced. As of 2016, this church is still in use.

== Cemeteries ==
There are three cemeteries located within the village of Spencerville: Spencerville Union Cemetery, St. Laurence O’Toole's Cemetery, and St. Andrew's Presbyterian Cemetery.

Spencerville Union Cemetery is a non-denominational cemetery located along Goodin Road. It is unknown when burials first took place at this location. Some of the oldest legible stones date from around the 1820s. This cemetery is currently maintained by a board of volunteers and remains in use.

St. Andrew's Presbyterian Cemetery is located on the land surrounding the village's Presbyterian church. This burial ground was established in 1835, the same year the first log church was established on that site. The cemetery is currently maintained by the church and is still in use.

St. Laurence O’Toole's Cemetery is a Roman Catholic cemetery located behind St. Laurence O’Toole's Church on Centre Street. The cemetery was established in 1883, and the first burial took place in 1888. This cemetery is currently still in use and is maintained by the Roman Catholic Church.

== Attractions ==
=== Spencerville Mill ===
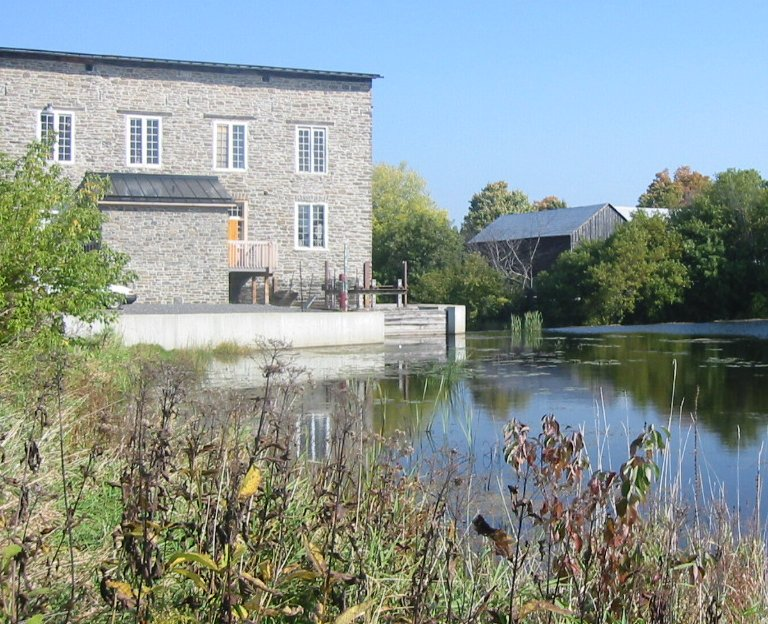
Spencerville Mill

One of the most notable pieces of architecture in the village of Spencerville is the stone mill, located along the South Nation River. The mill is considered an important historical structure, as the mill's construction was largely responsible for the village's settlement, and remained the economic backbone of the community for much of its early history.

The first mill was erected on the site of the current mill around 1811, by Peleg Spencer. The first mill is thought to have closed in 1814 when it disappeared from maps and records. In 1821, the Spencer family replaced the mill with a saw and a grist mill on the south bank of the river. The mills became the property of Peleg's son, David, in 1822. Around 1833, the mills were replaced by a stone building. By the 1850s, David Spencer began to expand his operation, adding a carding and fulling mill to the north bank of the river.

In 1859, a fire destroyed all three of the mills. David Spencer, who was apparently in poor health, was both unable and unwilling to rebuild the mills and sold the property to his daughter in 1862. Around 1864 a man named Robert Fairbairn, the son-in-law of David Spencer, rebuilt the stone grist mill. Fairbairn operated the rebuilt mill with a steam engine, which allowed the mill to operate even when water levels were low in the river. In 1882, Fairbairn's son became the owner of the mill. In 1886, the building was gutted by fire and the interior was reconstructed within the original walls.

The mill changed hands several times between the 1880s and 1903. In 1903, the Barnard family became in possession of the mill, who held onto it until its closure operating it as a grist mill. While operated by the Barnards, the mill underwent several upgrades: the wooden dam was replaced by a concrete dam, the steam engine was replaced with a gasoline engine, and the waterwheel was replaced by a turbine in 1934. In the 1950s, a store operated from the mill selling farm supplies such as fertilizer or grain, as well as hardware. In 1972, the mill ceased operations permanently.

The mill was purchased by the South Nation Conservation Authority in 1985 and is presently owned and cared for by the Spencerville Mill Foundation which is a volunteer organization. Since 1985, the mill had undergone several restoration projects and has been converted into a museum illustrating the history of the mill. The mill now hosts community or private events such as weddings or small concerts.

=== Spencerville Fair ===
The Spencerville Fair is an annual event, organized by the Spencerville Agricultural Society, which takes place on the second weekend in September. In 1854, the agricultural society was established, and the first fair was organized and held a year later in 1855. The fair began as an agricultural show, exhibiting items and events relating to agriculture such as equipment or livestock. The fair has been held in the same location since the second annual fair, off of Sloan and Ryan Street. Into the 1900s, the fair began to offer events and entertainment unrelated to agriculture in addition to its agricultural events. As of the 2000s, the fair has a parade, a midway, and an entertainment tent which serves as an outdoor bar and concert venue. Other events and attractions vary from year to year, but in recent years have included helicopter rides, petting zoos, and a blacksmith.

==== Other annual events ====
From 2004 until 2014, the community held an annual Christmas event called ‘A Country Christmas Remembered’. The event celebrated old-fashioned Christmas or winter traditions. During the event, volunteers decorated the village's mill and old homes in a manner typical of 1930s-era rural villages around Christmas. Events varied from year to year, but included horse-drawn carriage rides, family skating, and craft shows.

Beginning in June 2004, Spencerville also began hosting another new annual event, the Veterans Memorial Highland Games, featuring highland games, piping and drumming, and other events.

== Notable people ==
- Ernest M. McSorley, Master Captain of the lake freighter SS Edmund Fitzgerald, born in Spencerville on September 29, 1912.
