= Preston Elliott =

Canadian farmer and politician

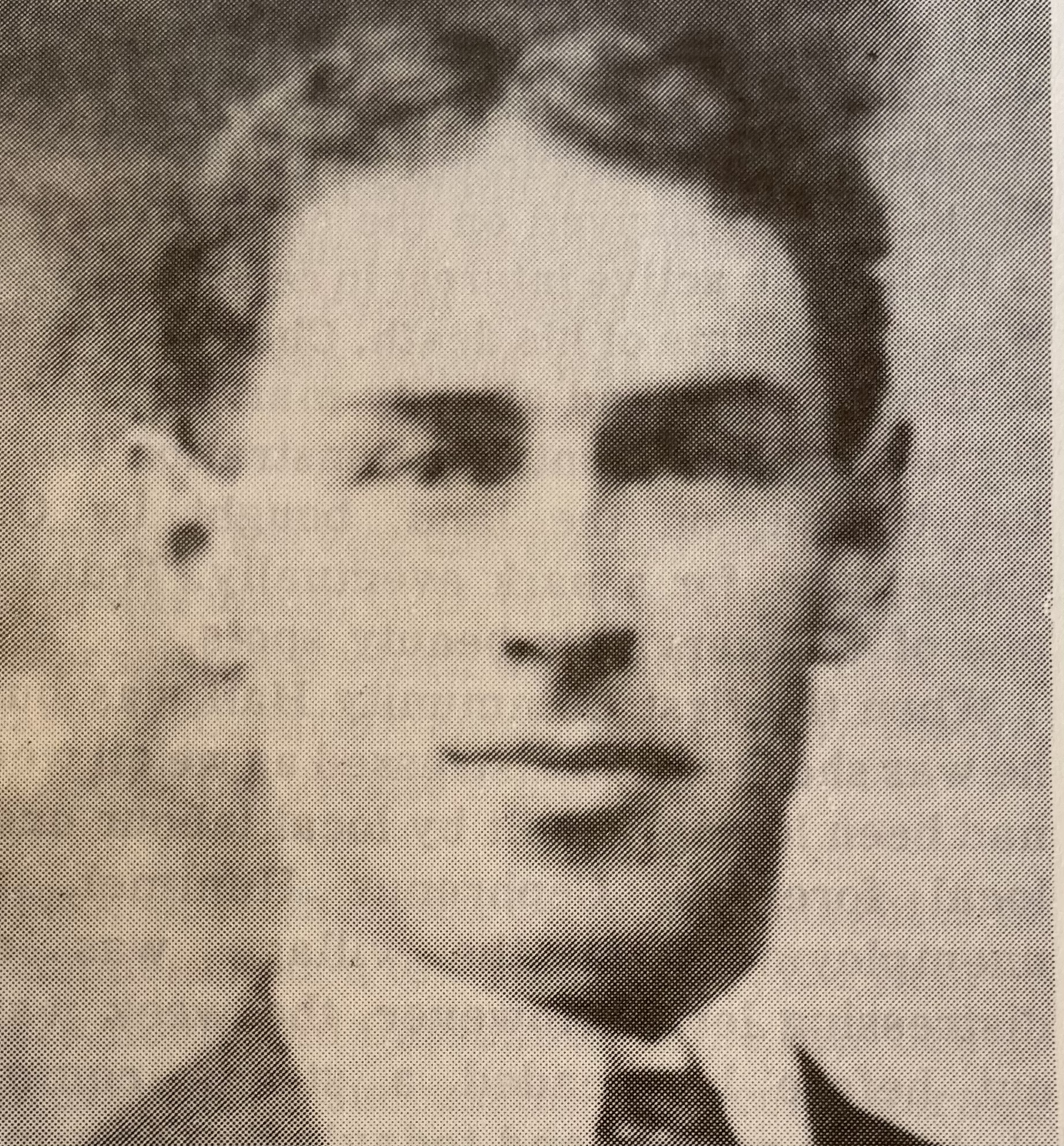

Member of the Canadian Parliament for Dundas
- In office 1921–1925
- Preceded by: Orren D. Casselman
- Succeeded by: none (riding abolished)

Personal details
- Born: May 1, 1875 Chesterville, Ontario
- Died: January 12, 1939 (aged 63)
- Party: Progressive Party of Canada

Preston Elliott (May 1, 1875 – January 12, 1939) was a Canadian farmer and politician from Ontario. Born in Chesterville, Ontario to William Elliott and Mary Agnes Rae, he served in the House of Commons of Canada for the Dundas electoral district as a member of the Progressive party. He was elected in 1921, but was defeated in the 1925 federal election. He was a Progressive candidate in 1926 and a Liberal in 1935, but lost both attempts at re-election. He was a member of the Ginger Group.
