= Dundas (provincial electoral district) =

Former provincial electoral district in Ontario, Canada

Ontario electoral district

Defunct provincial electoral district
- Legislature: Legislative Assembly of Ontario
- District created: 1867
- District abolished: 1933
- First contested: 1867
- Last contested: 1929

Dundas was an electoral riding in Ontario, Canada. It was created in 1867 at the time of confederation and was abolished in 1933 before the 1934 election. It was redistributed into the riding of Grenville-Dundas.

== Members of Provincial Parliament ==
Dundas
| Assembly | Years | Member | Party |
|---|---|---|---|
| 1st | 1867–1871 | Simon S. Cook | Liberal |
| 2nd | 1871–1874 | Simon S. Cook | Liberal |
| 3rd | 1875–1879 | Andrew Broder | Conservative |
| 4th | 1879–1883 | Andrew Broder | Conservative |
| 5th | 1883–1886 | Andrew Broder | Conservative |
| 6th | 1886–1887 | Theodore F. Chamberlain | Liberal |
| 6th | 1888–1890 | James Whitney (politician) | Conservative |
| 7th | 1890–1894 | James Whitney (politician) | Conservative |
| 8th | 1894–1898 | James Whitney (politician) | Conservative |
| 9th | 1898–1902 | James Whitney (politician) | Conservative |
| 10th | 1902–1904 | James Whitney (politician) | Conservative |
| 11th | 1905–1908 | James Whitney (politician) | Conservative |
| 12th | 1908–1911 | James Whitney (politician) | Conservative |
| 13th | 1911–1914 | James Whitney (politician) | Conservative |
| 14th | 1914–1919 | Irwin Foster Hilliard | Conservative |
| 15th | 1919–1923 | William H. Casselman | United Farmers |
| 16th | 1923–1926 | Aaron Sweet | Conservative |
| 17th | 1926–1929 | George Smyth | Prohibitionist |
| 18th | 1929–1934 | George Holmes Challies | Conservative |
Sourced from the Ontario Legislative Assembly
Merged into Grenville—Dundas before the 1934 election

== Election results ==
1929 Ontario general election
| Party | Candidate | Votes | % | ±% |
|---|---|---|---|---|
| Conservative | George Holmes Challies | 3,362 | 44.31 | –0.47 |
| Prohibitionist | Norman Wright Beach | 2,363 | 31.15 | – |
| Liberal | J. Wesley Hamilton | 1,862 | 24.54 | – |
| Total valid votes | | 7,587 | 99.28 | |
| Total rejected ballots | | 55 | 0.72 | –0.03 |
| Turnout | | 7,642 | 73.23 | –3.53 |
| Eligible voters | | 10,435 | | |
| Conservative gain from Liberal-Prohibitionist | | Swing | | –0.23 |
Source: Elections Ontario

1926 Ontario general election
| Party | Candidate | Votes | % | ±% |
|---|---|---|---|---|
| Liberal-Prohibitionist | George Smyth | 4,407 | 55.22 | – |
| Conservative | John McCormick | 3,574 | 44.78 | –9.29 |
| Total valid votes | | 7,981 | 99.25 | |
| Total rejected ballots | | 60 | 0.75 | –1.51 |
| Turnout | | 8,041 | 76.76 | +10.32 |
| Eligible voters | | 10,475 | | |
| Liberal-Prohibitionist gain from Conservative | | Swing | | – |
Source: Elections Ontario

1923 Ontario general election
| Party | Candidate | Votes | % | ±% |
|---|---|---|---|---|
| Conservative | Aaron Sweet | 3,773 | 54.07 | +13.52 |
| United Farmers | William H. Casselman | 3,205 | 45.93 | –13.52 |
| Total valid votes | | 6,978 | 97.74 | |
| Total rejected ballots | | 161 | 2.26 | –1.60 |
| Turnout | | 7,139 | 66.45 | –9.73 |
| Eligible voters | | 10,744 | | |
| Conservative gain from United Farmers | | Swing | | +13.52 |
Source: Elections Ontario

1919 Ontario general election
| Party | Candidate | Votes | % | ±% |
|---|---|---|---|---|
| United Farmers | William H. Casselman | 4,792 | 59.45 | – |
| Conservative | Irwin Foster Hilliard | 3,268 | 40.55 | –10.21 |
| Total valid votes | | 8,060 | 96.15 | |
| Total rejected ballots | | 323 | 3.85 | +3.85 |
| Turnout | | 8,383 | 76.17 | – |
| Eligible voters | | 11,005 | | |
| United Farmers gain from Conservative | | Swing | | – |
Source: Elections Ontario

Ontario provincial by-election, December 7, 1914 Death of James Whitney
| Party | Candidate | Votes | % | ±% |
|---|---|---|---|---|
| Conservative | Irwin Foster Hilliard | 2,084 | 50.75 | –8.22 |
| Liberal | John Alexander Campbell | 2,022 | 49.25 | +8.22 |
| Total valid votes | | 4,106 | 100.00 | |
| Total rejected ballots | | – | | |
| Turnout | | 4,106 | – | – |
| Eligible voters | | | | |
| Conservative hold | | Swing | | –8.22 |
Source: Elections Ontario

1914 Ontario general election
| Party | Candidate | Votes | % | ±% |
|---|---|---|---|---|
| Conservative | James Whitney | 2,212 | 58.97 | –3.98 |
| Liberal | Robert Stewart Muir | 1,539 | 41.03 | +3.98 |
| Total valid votes | | 3,751 | 99.55 | |
| Total rejected ballots | | 17 | 0.45 | +0.28 |
| Turnout | | 3,768 | 86.13 | +17.80 |
| Eligible voters | | 4,375 | | |
| Conservative hold | | Swing | | –3.98 |
Source: Elections Ontario

1911 Ontario general election
| Party | Candidate | Votes | % | ±% |
|---|---|---|---|---|
| Conservative | James Whitney | 2,239 | 62.95 | +0.27 |
| Liberal | Robert Stewart Muir | 1,318 | 37.05 | –0.27 |
| Total valid votes | | 3,557 | 99.83 | |
| Total rejected ballots | | 6 | 0.17 | –0.66 |
| Turnout | | 3,563 | 68.32 | –7.46 |
| Eligible voters | | 5,215 | | |
| Conservative hold | | Swing | | +0.27 |
Source: Elections Ontario

1908 Ontario general election
| Party | Candidate | Votes | % | ±% |
|---|---|---|---|---|
| Conservative | James Whitney | 2,260 | 62.67 | – |
| Liberal | Thomas McDonald | 1,346 | 37.33 | – |
| Total valid votes | | 3,606 | 99.17 | |
| Total rejected ballots | | 30 | 0.83 | – |
| Turnout | | 3,636 | 75.78 | – |
| Eligible voters | | 4,798 | | |
| Conservative hold | | Swing | | +0.00 |
Source: Elections Ontario

Ontario provincial by-election, February 21, 1905 Ministerial By-election on appointment as Premier and Attorney-General
| Party | Candidate | Votes |
|---|---|---|
| Conservative | James Whitney | acclaimed |
Source: Elections Ontario

1905 Ontario general election
| Party | Candidate | Votes | % | ±% |
|---|---|---|---|---|
| Conservative | James Whitney | 2,293 | 57.87 | +2.19 |
| Liberal | G. L. Brown | 1,669 | 42.13 | –2.19 |
| Total valid votes | | 3,962 | 99.12 | |
| Total rejected ballots | | 35 | 0.88 | –0.15 |
| Turnout | | 3,997 | 75.63 | – |
| Eligible voters | | 5,285 | | |
| Conservative hold | | Swing | | +2.19 |
Source: Elections Ontario

1902 Ontario general election
| Party | Candidate | Votes | % | ±% |
|---|---|---|---|---|
| Conservative | James Whitney | 2,470 | 55.68 | +4.31 |
| Liberal | W. G. Smythe | 1,966 | 44.32 | –4.31 |
| Total valid votes | | 4,436 | 98.97 | |
| Total rejected ballots | | 46 | 1.03 | +0.20 |
| Turnout | | 4,482 | – | – |
| Eligible voters | | | | |
| Conservative hold | | Swing | | +4.31 |
Source: Elections Ontario

1898 Ontario general election
| Party | Candidate | Votes | % | ±% |
|---|---|---|---|---|
| Conservative | James Whitney | 2,354 | 51.37 | –1.06 |
| Liberal | Wesley Byron Lawson | 2,228 | 48.63 | – |
| Total valid votes | | 4,582 | 99.18 | |
| Total rejected ballots | | 38 | 0.82 | +0.38 |
| Turnout | | 4,620 | 86.40 | +9.19 |
| Eligible voters | | 5,347 | | |
| Conservative hold | | Swing | | –0.53 |
Source: Elections Ontario

1894 Ontario general election
| Party | Candidate | Votes | % | ±% |
|---|---|---|---|---|
| Conservative | James Whitney | 2,010 | 52.44 | +0.51 |
| Conservative-Patron | James P. Fox | 1,823 | 47.56 | – |
| Total valid votes | | 3,833 | 99.56 | |
| Total rejected ballots | | 17 | 0.44 | +0.07 |
| Turnout | | 3,850 | 77.22 | –0.94 |
| Eligible voters | | 4,986 | | |
| Conservative hold | | Swing | | +0.26 |
Source: Elections Ontario

1890 Ontario general election
| Party | Candidate | Votes | % | ±% |
|---|---|---|---|---|
| Conservative | James Whitney | 2,104 | 51.92 | +1.58 |
| Liberal | George Perry Graham | 1,948 | 48.08 | –1.58 |
| Total valid votes | | 4,052 | 99.63 | |
| Total rejected ballots | | 15 | 0.37 | +0.37 |
| Turnout | | 4,067 | 78.15 | – |
| Eligible voters | | 5,204 | | |
| Conservative hold | | Swing | | +1.58 |
Source: Elections Ontario

Ontario provincial by-election, January 31, 1888 Void Election
| Party | Candidate | Votes | % | ±% |
|---|---|---|---|---|
| Conservative | James Whitney | 2,065 | 50.34 | +0.66 |
| Liberal | Theodore F. Chamberlain | 2,037 | 49.66 | –0.66 |
| Total valid votes | | 4,102 | 100.00 | |
| Total rejected ballots | | – | | |
| Turnout | | 4,102 | – | – |
| Eligible voters | | | | |
| Conservative gain from Liberal | | Swing | | +0.66 |
Source: Elections Ontario

1886 Ontario general election
| Party | Candidate | Votes | % | ±% |
|---|---|---|---|---|
| Liberal | Theodore F. Chamberlain | 1,977 | 50.32 | +2.52 |
| Conservative | James Whitney | 1,952 | 49.68 | –2.52 |
| Total valid votes | | 3,929 | 99.14 | |
| Total rejected ballots | | 34 | 0.86 | –0.29 |
| Turnout | | 3,963 | 81.54 | +4.22 |
| Eligible voters | | 4,860 | | |
| Liberal gain from Conservative | | Swing | | +2.52 |
Source: Elections Ontario

1883 Ontario general election
| Party | Candidate | Votes | % | ±% |
|---|---|---|---|---|
| Conservative | Andrew Broder | 1,798 | 52.21 | +0.97 |
| Liberal | Mr. McDonald | 1,646 | 47.79 | –0.97 |
| Total valid votes | | 3,444 | 98.85 | |
| Total rejected ballots | | 40 | 1.15 | +1.15 |
| Turnout | | 3,484 | 77.32 | +0.03 |
| Eligible voters | | 4,506 | | |
| Conservative hold | | Swing | | +0.97 |
Source: Elections Ontario

1879 Ontario general election
| Party | Candidate | Votes | % | ±% |
|---|---|---|---|---|
| Conservative | Andrew Broder | 1,674 | 51.24 | −2.92 |
| Liberal | Theodore F. Chamberlain | 1,593 | 48.76 | |
| Total valid votes | | 3,267 | 77.29 | |
| Eligible voters | | 4,227 | | |
| Conservative hold | | Swing | | −2.92 |
Source: Elections Ontario

Ontario provincial by-election, September 1875 Previous election voided
| Party | Candidate | Votes | % | ±% |
|---|---|---|---|---|
| Conservative | Andrew Broder | 1,505 | 54.16 | +10.24 |
| Independent | Mr. Rose | 1,274 | 45.84 | |
| Total valid votes | | 2,779 | | |
| Conservative gain from Liberal | | Swing | | +10.24 |
Source: History of the Electoral Districts, Legislatures and Ministries of the Province of Ontario

1875 Ontario general election
| Party | Candidate | Votes | % | ±% |
|---|---|---|---|---|
| Conservative | Andrew Broder | 1,458 | 51.67 | +7.75 |
| Liberal | Simon S. Cook | 1,364 | 48.33 | −7.75 |
| Turnout | | 2,822 | 74.99 | −1.29 |
| Eligible voters | | 3,763 | | |
Election voided
Source: Elections Ontario

1871 Ontario general election
| Party | Candidate | Votes | % | ±% |
|---|---|---|---|---|
| Liberal | Simon S. Cook | 1,216 | 56.09 | +2.52 |
| Conservative | Mr. McDonald | 952 | 43.91 | −2.52 |
| Turnout | | 2,168 | 76.28 | −3.14 |
| Eligible voters | | 2,842 | | |
| Liberal hold | | Swing | | +2.52 |
Source: Elections Ontario

1867 Ontario general election
| Party | Candidate | Votes | % |
|---|---|---|---|
| Liberal | Simon S. Cook | 1,162 | 53.57 |
| Conservative | Mr. Doran | 1,007 | 46.43 |
| Total valid votes | | 2,169 | 79.42 |
| Eligible voters | | 2,731 | |
| Liberal pickup new district. | | | |
Source: Elections Ontario
