= Charles Erastus Hickey =

Canadian politician

Charles Erastus Hickey (March 24, 1840 – September 19, 1908) was a physician and political figure in Ontario, Canada. He represented Dundas in the House of Commons of Canada from 1882 to 1891 as a Conservative member.

He was born in Williamsburg, Upper Canada, the son of John Hickey. Hickey was educated at Victoria University in Cobourg and McGill University. In 1873, he married Mary Elizabeth Beers. Hickey also served as an inspector of schools.
