= South Dundas =

- Municipality (lower-tier)
- Municipality of South Dundas
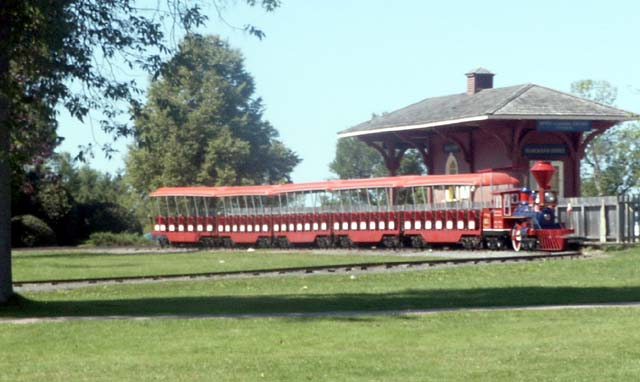
- Upper Canada Village in Morrisburg

- Location within United Counties of Stormont, Dundas and Glengarry Location within Southern Ontario
- Coordinates: 44°55′N 75°16′W
- Country: Canada
- Province: Ontario
- County: Stormont, Dundas and Glengarry
- Settled: 1785
- Incorporated: 1792 (Royal Townships)
- Incorporated: 1998 (South Dundas)

Government
  - Type: Municipality
  - Mayor: Jason Broad
  - Federal riding: Stormont—Dundas—Glengarry
  - Prov. riding: Stormont—Dundas—South Glengarry

Area
  - Land: 521.54 km^{2} (201.37 sq mi)

Population (2021)
  - Total: 11,044
  - Density: 21.2/km^{2} (55/sq mi)
- Time zone: UTC-5 (EST)
  - Summer (DST): UTC-4 (EDT)
- Postal code FSA: K0C, K0E
- Area code: 613
- Website: www.southdundas.com

South Dundas is a municipality in eastern Ontario, Canada, in the United Counties of Stormont, Dundas and Glengarry along the north shore of the St. Lawrence River. It is located approximately 100 kilometres (62 miles) south of Ottawa and is midway between Kingston and Montreal, Quebec.

== Communities ==
The Municipality of South Dundas comprises a number of villages and hamlets, including the following communities:

- The western portion, in the former Matilda Township: Brinston, Dixons Corners, Dundela, Glen Stewart, Hanesville, Hulbert, Irena, Iroquois, Stampville; Haddo, Pleasant Valley, Rowena, Toyes Hill; Iroquois Beach, New Ross, Oak Valley (partially), Pinetree Point, Rapide Plat Point, Robertson Point, Straders Hill
- The eastern portion, in the former Williamsburg Township: Dunbar, Elma, Glen Becker, Morrisburg, Riverside Heights, Williamsburg, Winchester Springs (partially); Archer, Beckstead, Boucks Hill, Colquhoust, Froatburn, Grantley (partially), Hoasic, Mariatown, Nudell Bush, Orchardside; Colquhoun, Crysler Beach, Doran Point, Marina Bay, Morrisburg Beach, Muttonville, The Sixth, Whitney Point, Upper Canada Village,

The municipal administrative offices are located in Morrisburg.

== History ==
The county was named in 1792 to honour Henry Dundas, who was Lord Advocate for Scotland and Colonial Secretary at the time. Matilda and Williamsburgh were two of Upper Canada's original eight Royal Townships. The northern portions of Matilda and Williamsburg townships were separated in 1798 to form the new townships of Mountain and Winchester within Dundas County.

The McIntosh apple was discovered and cultivated in South Dundas near Williamsburg. John McIntosh's parents emigrated from Inverness, Scotland to the Mohawk Valley in New York, and John moved to Upper Canada in 1796. In 1811 he acquired a farm in Dundela, and while clearing the land of second growth discovered several apple seedlings. He transplanted these, and one bore the superior fruit which became famous as the McIntosh Red apple. John's son Allan established a nursery and promoted this new species extensively. It was widely acclaimed in Ontario and the northern United States, and was introduced into British Columbia about 1910.

During the War of 1812, several battles were fought in Dundas County, present day South Dundas. The Battle of Matilda, Battle of Point Iroquois, Skirmish at Doran's Farm, and the Battle of Crysler's Farm were all fought in Dundas County along the St. Lawrence River. As well, the Dundas Militia built numerous earthworks and breastworks along the river to fortify the area from attack, in 1814, the earthwork at Point Iroquois was expanded to include a blockhouse, but due to the construction so late in the war, and the relative peace, the fort was called Fort Needless.

Morrisburg took its name from James Morris, Canada's first postmaster general. Morris also played an important role in canal-building in the area.

James Pliny Whitney, Ontario's sixth premier, is buried here in the cemetery of Holy Trinity Anglican Church in Riverside Heights, just east of Morrisburg and north of County Road 2 (formerly Highway 2). Whitney was born in Williamsburg in 1843, represented Dundas County in the Legislature from 1888 to 1914 and served as Premier from 1905 to 1914.

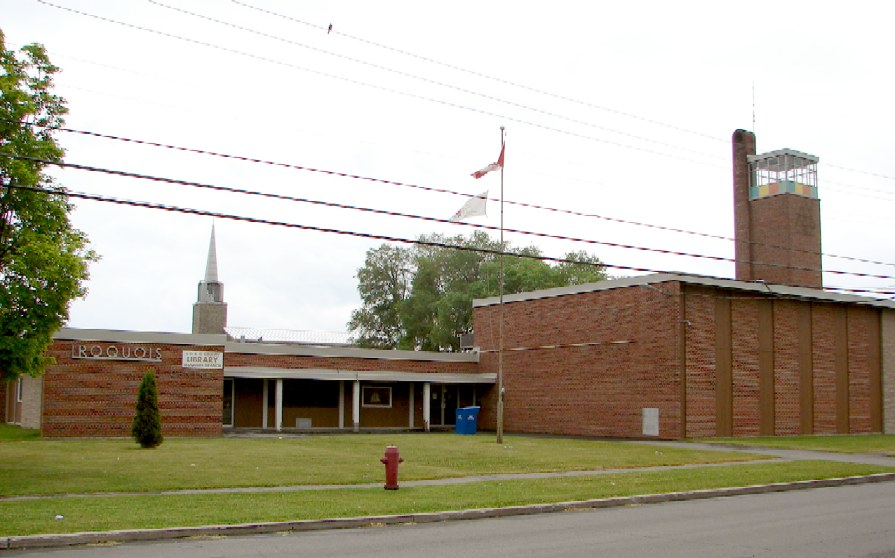
Iroquois library and fire station at the new townsite

Morrisburg and Iroquois were partially flooded by the creation of the St. Lawrence Seaway in 1958. Unlike the Lost Villages of Cornwall and Osnabruck Townships, however, the two towns were simply relocated to higher ground in the same area. There was an international design competition in 1954 to design the new Iroquois townsite. Canadian-British architect Wells Coates was among those who submitted redevelopment concepts.

An artificial lake, Lake Saint Lawrence, now extends from a hydroelectric dam at Cornwall to the control structure at Iroquois, and replaces the formerly narrow and turbulent section of river that was impassable to large vessels. It replaces, in part, the Long Sault rapids.

Several buildings from the Lost Villages were moved to a site near Morrisburg to create Upper Canada Village, a living museum which depicts 19th century life in Upper Canada.

In 1976, stuntman Ken Carter attempted to jump a one-mile portion of the St. Lawrence River by taking a one million dollar Lincoln Continental rocket car off an eight-storey ramp. This was billed as The Super Jump. The ramp and its runway were located in a field just west of Hanes Road, South of County road 2. The ramp has since been demolished, but the concrete runway still exists as of 2012.

The municipality was established on January 1, 1998, with the amalgamation of the former townships of Matilda and Williamsburg, along with the former villages of Iroquois and Morrisburg.

Charles A. Barkley, who was elected mayor of the municipality in the 2006 municipal elections, died unexpectedly on June 17, 2009. He had been a municipal politician since 1981, when he joined the Township of Matilda council. He was succeeded by deputy mayor Robert Gillard.

== Demographics ==
In the 2021 Census of Population conducted by Statistics Canada, South Dundas had a population of 11,044 living in 4,651 of its 4,821 total private dwellings, a change of 1.8% from its 2016 revised population of 10,852. With a land area of 521.54 km^{2} (201.37 sq mi), it had a population density of 21.2/km^{2} (54.8/sq mi) in 2021.

Canada census – South Dundas community profile

	2021	2016	2011
Population	11,044 (+1.8% from 2016)	10,833 (0.4% from 2011)	10,794 (2.5% from 2006)
Land area	521.54 km^{2} (201.37 sq mi)	521.06 km^{2} (201.18 sq mi)	520.10 km^{2} (200.81 sq mi)
Population density	21.2/km^{2} (55/sq mi)	20.8/km^{2} (54/sq mi)	20.8/km^{2} (54/sq mi)
Median age	50.8 (M: 50.0, F: 52.0)	50.0 (M: 49.3, F: 50.6)	47.3 (M: 46.7, F: 48.1)
Private dwellings	4,821 (total) 4,651 (occupied)	4,830 (total)	4700 (total)
Median household income	$78,000	$65,067

References: 2021 2016 2011

Historical census populations

Year	Pop.	±%
1986	9,772	—
1991	10,230	+4.7%
1996	10,900	+6.5%
2001	10,783	−1.1%

Year	Pop.	±%
2006	10,535	−2.3%
2011	10,794	+2.5%
2016	10,833	+0.4%
2021	11,044	+1.9%

Population amounts prior to 2001 are total of Matilda TP, Williamsburgh TP, Iroquois VL, and Morrisburg VL.
Source: Statistics Canada

== Transportation ==
The only provincial highway directly serving the municipality is Highway 401. All other highway routes in the municipality, including Highway 2 and Highway 31, were decommissioned by the province in the 1990s, and were folded into Stormont, Dundas and Glengarry's county road system. Highway 416, the main route from the 401 to Ottawa, has its southern terminus at Johnstown in the neighbouring township of Edwardsburgh/Cardinal.

Morrisburg is served by a small, unattended airport adjacent to Upper Canada Village. Iroquois is served by a small unattended airport near the locks.

== Sport ==
The Morrisburg Lions of the Eastern Ontario Junior B Hockey League play out of the Morrisburg Arena.

Thoroughbred racing pioneer Francine Villeneuve grew up in the community of Winchester Springs.

== See also ==
- List of townships in Ontario
- Royal eponyms in Canada
