= Morrisburg, Ontario =

Morrisburg
- Unincorporated community
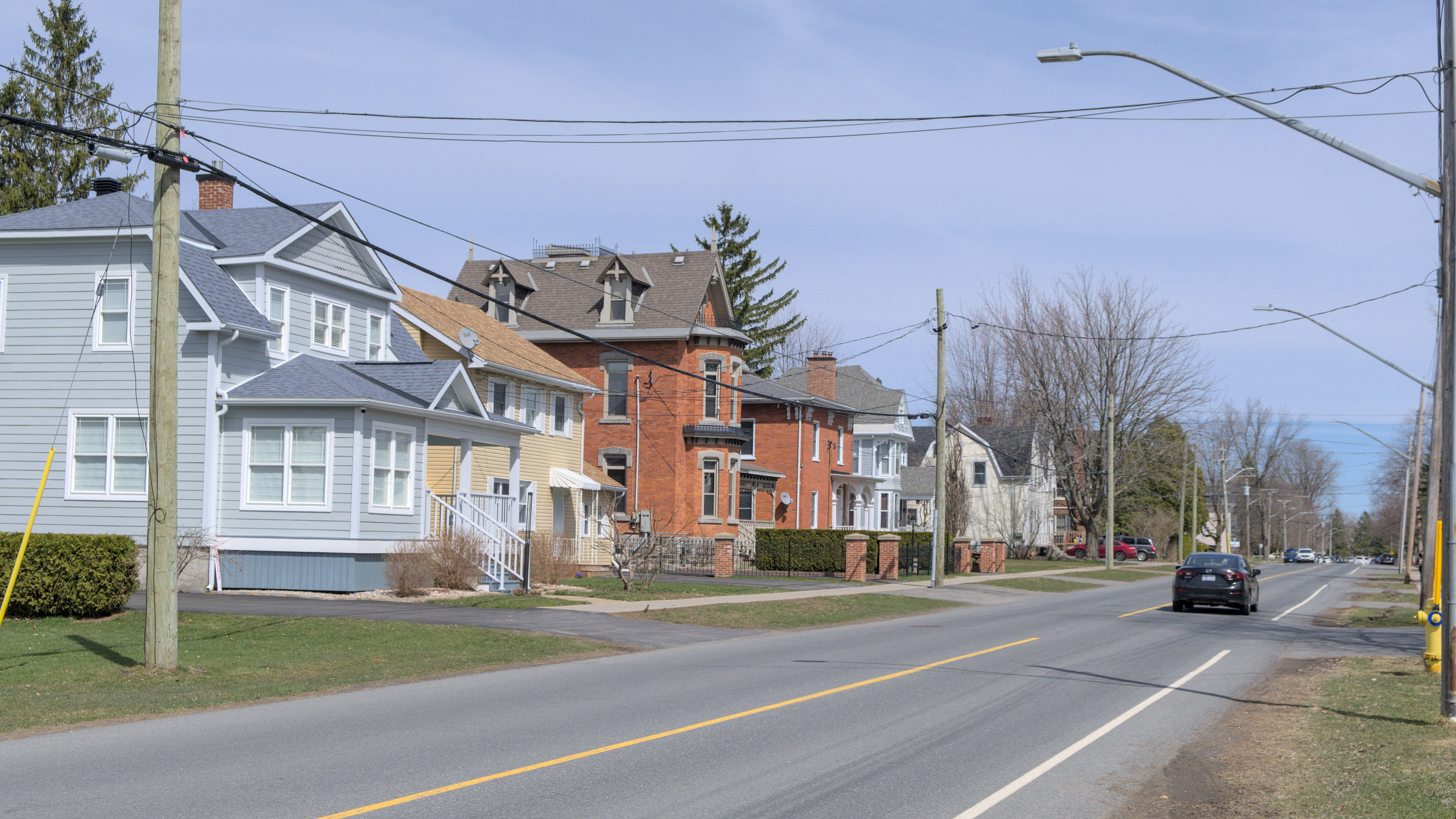
- Lakeshore Drive in Morrisburg

- Location within United Counties of Stormont, Dundas and Glengarry Location within Southern Ontario
- Coordinates: 44°53′50″N 75°11′00″W
- Country: Canada
- Province: Ontario
- County: Stormont, Dundas and Glengarry
- Municipality: South Dundas
- Settled: 1840s
- Incorporated: 1860
- Dissolved (amalgamated): January 1, 1998

Area
  - Land: 1.36 km^{2} (0.53 sq mi)

Population (2021)
  - Total: 2,398
  - Density: 1,759.5/km^{2} (4,557/sq mi)
- Time zone: UTC−05:00 (EST)
  - Summer (DST): UTC−04:00 (EDT)
- Postal Code FSA: K0C
- Area codes: 613

Morrisburg is an unincorporated community in the Municipality of South Dundas, located along the St. Lawrence River in Eastern Ontario, Canada. The population was 2,398 at the 2021 census.

== History ==
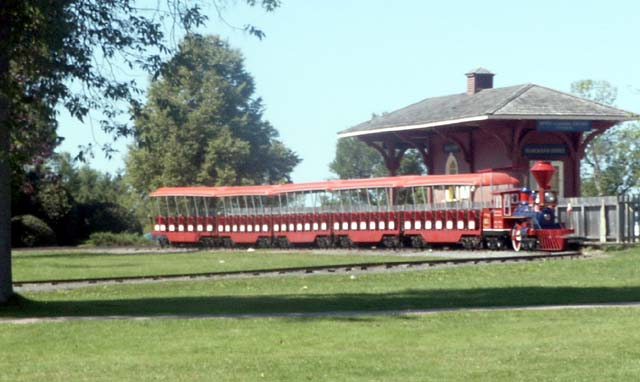
Upper Canada Village near Morrisburg

On November 11, 1813, a small British force repelled an invading American army at the Battle of Crysler's Farm, which took place near what was later to be called Morrisburg.

United Empire Loyalist settlers settled in Dundas County, creating West Williamsburg and was part of the Williamsburg Canal project. Between 1843 and 1856, canals were built on the north side of the St. Lawrence River. West Williamsburg was renamed Morrisburg in 1851, in honour of Brockville, Ontario, politician James Morris, who was named the first Postmaster General of the United Province of Canada. Incorporated as a village in 1860, Morrisburg had a growing manufacturing base consisting of a gristmill, a carding mill and a fanning mill. The Grand Trunk Railway reached Morrisburg in 1855. Eventually a power station was built on the St. Lawrence River.

During the 1950s, portions of Morrisburg were relocated because of expected flooding caused by the St. Lawrence Seaway project. Over 80 homes were moved and the entire downtown business district was demolished and relocated to a shopping plaza. The Canadian National Railway line was moved 1.1 kilometres (0.68 mi) north of its original location. Much of the former railbed was used in the reconstruction of Ontario Highway 2. Buildings and other artifacts were moved and assembled to create Upper Canada Village, a tribute to the area's pioneers.

A notable incident in the history of high-speed rail in Canada took place near Morrisburg in 1979, when a UAC TurboTrain operated by Via Rail on westbound service from Montréal to Toronto caught fire after developing an oil leak. The train was quickly evacuated and ultimately a third of it was destroyed in the fire. The troubled Turbo Trains were retired a few years later, in 1982.

On January 1, 1998, Morrisburg was amalgamated with the Village of Iroquois, along with Matilda and Williamsburg Townships, into the Township of South Dundas.

== Demographics ==
Historical census populations – Morrisburg, Ontario [Population centre]

Year	Pop.	±%
1871	1,156	—
1881	1,719	+48.7%
1891	1,859	+8.1%
1901	1,693	−8.9%
1911	1,696	+0.2%
1921	1,444	−14.9%
1931	1,420	−1.7%
1941	1,575	+10.9%

Year	Pop.	±%
1951	1,858	+18.0%
1956	2,131	+14.7%
1961	1,820	−14.6%
1966	1,938	+6.5%
1971	2,055	+6.0%
1976	2,188	+6.5%
1981	2,308	+5.5%
1986	2,351	+1.9%

Year	Pop.	±%
1991	2,429	+3.3%
1996	2,538	+4.5%
2001	2,568	+1.2%
2006	2,725	+6.1%
2011	2,756	+1.1%
2016	2,385	−13.5%
2021	2,398	+0.5%

Population counts are not adjusted for boundary changes. Population counts prior to 1998 are for Morrisburg Village.
Source: Statistics Canada
