= Alexander G.F. Macdonald =

Canadian soldier and publisher

Lieutenant Colonel Alexander George Fraser Macdonald
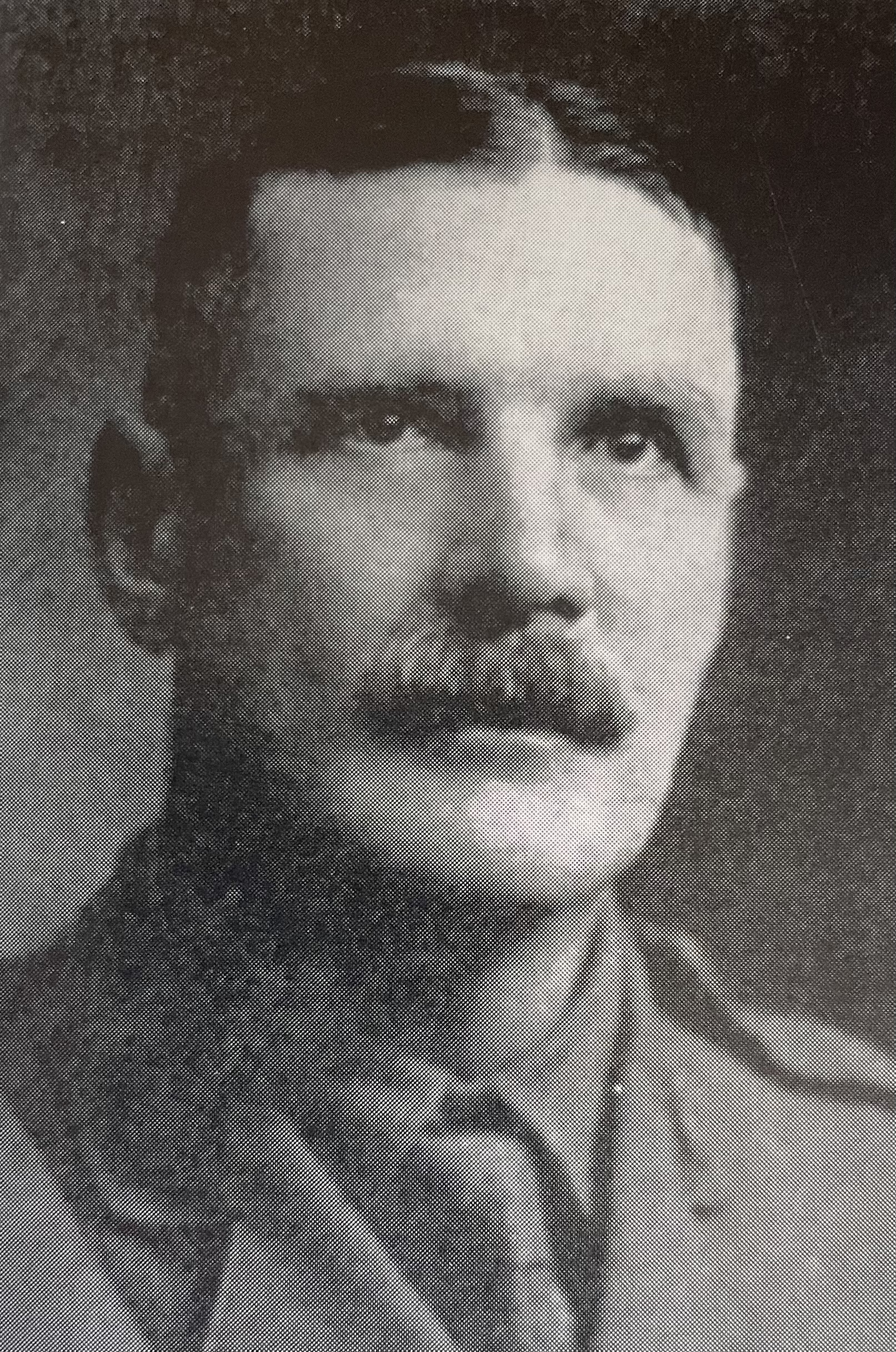
- Born: August 23, 1863; Alexandria, Glengarry County
- Died: June 24, 1948 (aged 84); Cartierville, Quebec
- Burial place: Alexandria
- Education: Upper Canada College; Loyola College
- Spouse: Marie Justine Eugenie Hubert
- Relatives: Donald Alexander Macdonald (father); John Sandfield Macdonald (uncle); Alexander Francis Macdonald (uncle); Colonel Alexander Fraser (grandfather); Robert Abercrombie Pringle (cousin)
- Military career
- Allegiance: Canada
- Branch: Non-Permanent Active Militia; Canadian Expeditionary Force
- Service years: 1897 - 1948
- Rank: Lieutenant Colonel; Honorary Colonel
- Nickname: George Sandfield
- Unit: 3rd (Special Service) Battalion
- Commands: 59th Stormont and Glengarry Regiment; 154th Battalion, CEF
- Conflicts: Second Boer War; Halifax Garrison; First World War; St. Lawrence Canal Patrol; England

Alexander George Fraser Macdonald (August 23, 1863 – June 24, 1948) was a Canadian soldier and publisher who commanded the 154th Battalion, CEF during the First World War. He was also a good friend of Sir Sam Hughes.

== Early life ==
Alexander George Fraser Macdonald was born on August 23, 1863, in Alexandria, Glengarry County, to Donald Alexander Macdonald and Catherine Grant Fraser. His father served as the 4th Lieutenant Governor of Ontario from 1875 to 1880. His mother was the daughter of Colonel Alexander Fraser, a politician and militiaman from Glengarry County.

In 1875, Macdonald began studying at Upper Canada College and in 1880 he attended Loyola College. Upon graduation he lived in Montreal, marrying Eugenie Hubert (1865–1934) in 1890. Her father, Richard Hubert, had fought as a rebel at the Battle of Saint-Denis during the Lower Canada Rebellion. Alexander and Eugenie moved to Alexandria in 1890, settling at the manor house of the Macdonalds: Garry Fen.

In 1892, while living in Alexandria, Macdonald became the editor and publisher of a local newspaper, The Glengarry News. The newspaper has been continuously published since 1892 and is one of the prominent local papers.

=== Family ===
Alexander and Eugenie Macdonald had eleven children:

- Donald Macdonald, K.C., K.G. (1891–)
- George Fraser Macdonald (1894–1916), who served as a Lieutenant with the 50th Battalion (Calgary), CEF and was killed in action at the Battle of the Ancre
- Marie Hermine Marguerite Macdonald (1895–1920)
- Hubert Sandfield Macdonald (1899–1981), who served as a Lance Corporal under his father in the 154th Battalion, CEF
- Marie Beatrice Macdonald (1900–1979)
- Katherine Ida Mary Macdonald (1901–1935)
- Ian Bruce Francis Macdonald (1903–1944), who served as a Sergeant in the S., D.& G., Highlanders and Medical Corps during the Second World War and died of a brain tumor in England
- Mary Louise Hilda Macdonald (1904–1971)
- Ronald Eugene Robert Macdonald (1906–1989)
- John Sandfield Macdonald (1910–1941)
- Eugene Alexander Macdonald (1911–1988)

== Military career ==
=== Early service ===
Following in the footsteps of his father, uncle, and grandfather who had all been officers in the Glengarry Militia, Macdonald joined the local 59th Stormont and Glengarry Regiment as a Second Lieutenant in No.3 Company on May 14, 1897. In 1898, he attended the School of Infantry in Saint-Jean-sur-Richelieu in order to be appointed Lieutenant and on June 21 he commanded No.3 Company of the 59th at the military camp at Kingston. On September 13, 1898, Macdonald was promoted to captain in command of No.3 Company.

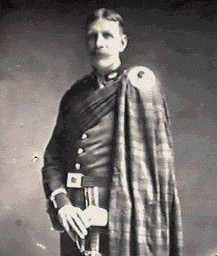
Col. Macdonald, commanding the 59th Stormont and Glengarry Regiment

=== Boer War ===
With the outbreak of the Second Boer War in 1899 and the departure of soldiers from Canadian garrisons to South Africa, a new militia battalion was raised to serve guard duty in Halifax. This battalion was titled the 3rd (Special Service) Battalion, Royal Canadian Regiment of Infantry and served in the garrison at the Halifax citadel and Wellington Barracks. On March 16, 1900, Macdonald was appointed a captain in command of B Company, 3rd (Special Service) Battalion and proceeded to Halifax. He served in the garrison at Halifax until early 1901 when he returned to Glengarry. He attended the military camps with No.3 Company at Kingston in 1901 and Niagara in 1902, before being promoted to Major. In 1905 he commanded the company at the Rockliffe Camp in Ottawa and in April 1910 he was promoted to Lieutenant Colonel and appointed to command of the 59th Regiment.

With the appointment of his friend, Sir Sam Hughes, as the Minister of Militia and Defence in 1911, Macdonald lobbied for a new armoury to be built in Alexandria for the use of the 59th Regiment. There was not enough funds to construct an armoury however and the 59th continued to drill at Garry Fen that year. In 1913, Macdonald and Hughes attended military training demonstrations in Britain and later that year Hughes visited Alexandria where he was greeted by the pipes and drums of the 59th and escorted from the railway station to Mill Square where he inspected a guard of honour before dining with the Officers at Garry Fen. At a concert that evening the Minister thanked Macdonald and thanked the town for the donation of land to build an Armoury and confirmed that Alexandria and the 59th Regiment would indeed get their Armoury. The Armoury was functional by the outbreak of war in August 1914 and officially opened with a grand ball in October of that year. The cost of the armoury was $18,896.15.

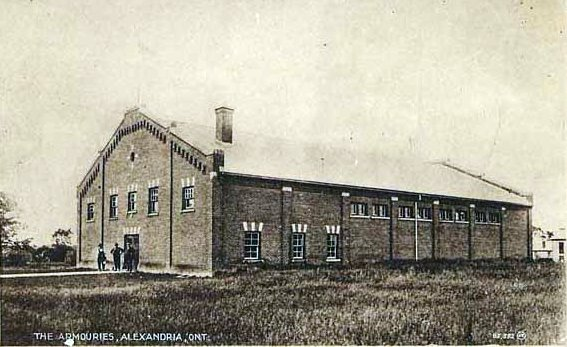
Alexandria Armoury, c.1915

=== First World War ===
With the outbreak of war on August 4, 1914, ”A” and “B” Companies of the 59th Stormont and Glengarry Regiment were instructed to place military guards on the locks on the St Lawrence Canal at Morrisburg, Farran's point and Cornwall. On August 8, Lt-Colonel Macdonald was placed in command of all troops on guard duty from Prescott to Cornwall, with his headquarters in the offices of the Morrisburg Leader newspaper. The force consisted of 22 officers and 258 other ranks, from the 59th Stormont and Glengarry Regiment, 56th Grenville Regiment, and the 4th Hussars and in October the force was renamed as the St. Lawrence Canal Patrol.

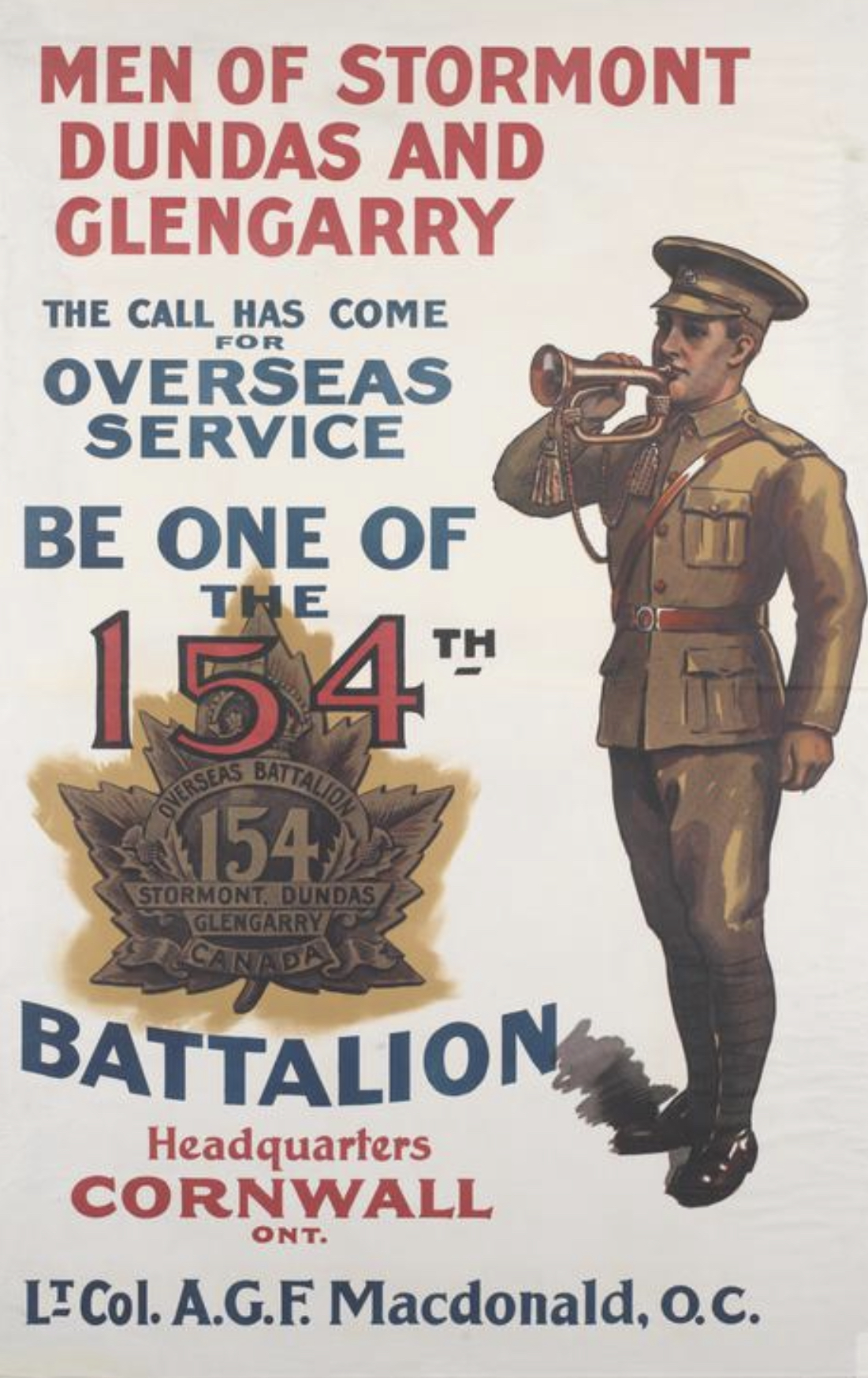
Recruiting poster for the 154th Battalion

On November 5, 1915, Parliament approved the recruitment of 150,000 more men for the CEF, and on December 1, Lt-Col. Macdonald was asked to form the 154th Overseas Battalion of men from Stormont, Dundas, Glengarry, Prescott, and Russell counties. Macdonald would serve as Commanding Officer, with Maj. W.H. Magwood of the 59th Stormont and Glengarry Regiment serving as Second-in-Command. Throughout the winter, the various village detachments trained as best was possible and on May 31, 1916, the entire Battalion concentrated at Barriefield Camp with 1150 men of all ranks present. At Barriefield, the Battalion was brigaded with the 155th (Belleville-Quite) Battalion and the 156th (Leeds and Grenville) Battalion. On September 14, 1916, the Battalion, consisting of 27 officers and 928 other ranks under the command of Colonel Alexander Macdonald, was inspected by Maj.-Gen. F.L. Lessard and pronounced fit for overseas duty. On October 5, the battalion was restyled as the 154th Overseas Battalion, Highlanders in honour of the Scottish history of Stormont, Dundas & Glengarry, and was finally ready to proceed overseas.

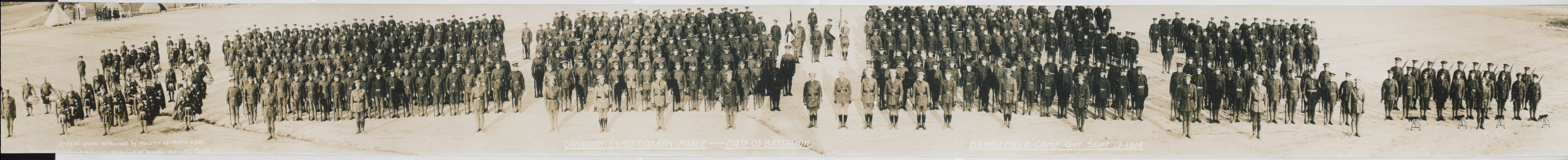
154th Battalion, Barriefield Camp, Ontario, Sept. 13, 1916

Colonel Macdonald and the 154th boarded the trains at Kingston on October 21, 1916, arriving in Halifax on October 24 and embarking on the HMT Mauretania the night of October 25–26. The battalion docked in Liverpool, England, on October 31 and Colonel Macdonald marched the regiment through the pouring rain to Bramshott Camp. In England, the battalion conducted daily training consisting of physical training, bayonet fighting, squad drill, platoon and company drill, musketry, anti-gas drills, entrenching, field works, and route marching. Men from the battalion were detached to other CEF battalions as reinforcements were required for the front lines.

Throughout their service in England under the command of Macdonald, the 154th Battalion was stationed at Bramshott, Whitley, and East Sandling military camps from November 1916 to January 1917. On January 31, 1917, the battalion was broken up and absorbed into the 6th Reserve Battalion at East Sandling. On 6 March 1917, Macdonald lost all that remained of his command when the headquarters of the 154th Battalion was dissolved. His great work with the regiment had existed for 427 days. The men of the 154th Battalion were distributed among the frontline units in France, but Macdonald returned home to Glengarry.

During early May 1917, Archibald Cameron Macdonell, commanding 7th Brigade arranged for Macdonald to visit his headquarters in France. He was taken to the recent battlefield of Vimy Ridge. He then went to visit his son Fraser's grave on the Somme and on July 25, 1917, returned home again.

== Later life ==
Upon his return in 1917, he was appointed to serve as a Militia Department member on the Exemption Tribunal for those wishing to avoid conscription in 1917 and 1918. He continued to serve as commanding officer of the 59th Regiment until 1920.

From 1925 until 1942, Macdonald served as the Honorary Lieutenant Colonel of the Stormont, Dundas and Glengarry Highlanders and as the Honorary Colonel from 1942 until his death in 1948.

Colonel Alexander George Fraser Macdonald died on June 24, 1948, in Cartierville, Quebec, and is buried in the family cemetery in Alexandria, Glengarry County.

== Legacy ==
In his honour, a Royal Canadian Legion branch was opened in Alexandria in 1946 and named the A.G.F. Macdonald Branch 423.

Macdonald donated an acre of land in Alexandria to serve as the local cenotaph in memory of his son who died in 1916. The Glengarry Soldiers Memorial was dedicated by the Governor General, Lord Byng of Vimy on Oct. 1, 1923. A second plaque, honouring those soldiers, sailors and airmen from the County who died in the Second World War was unveiled on Nov. 6, 1957, by Governor General Vincent Massey.
