= 154th (Stormont-Dundas-Glengarry) Battalion, CEF =

154th Battalion
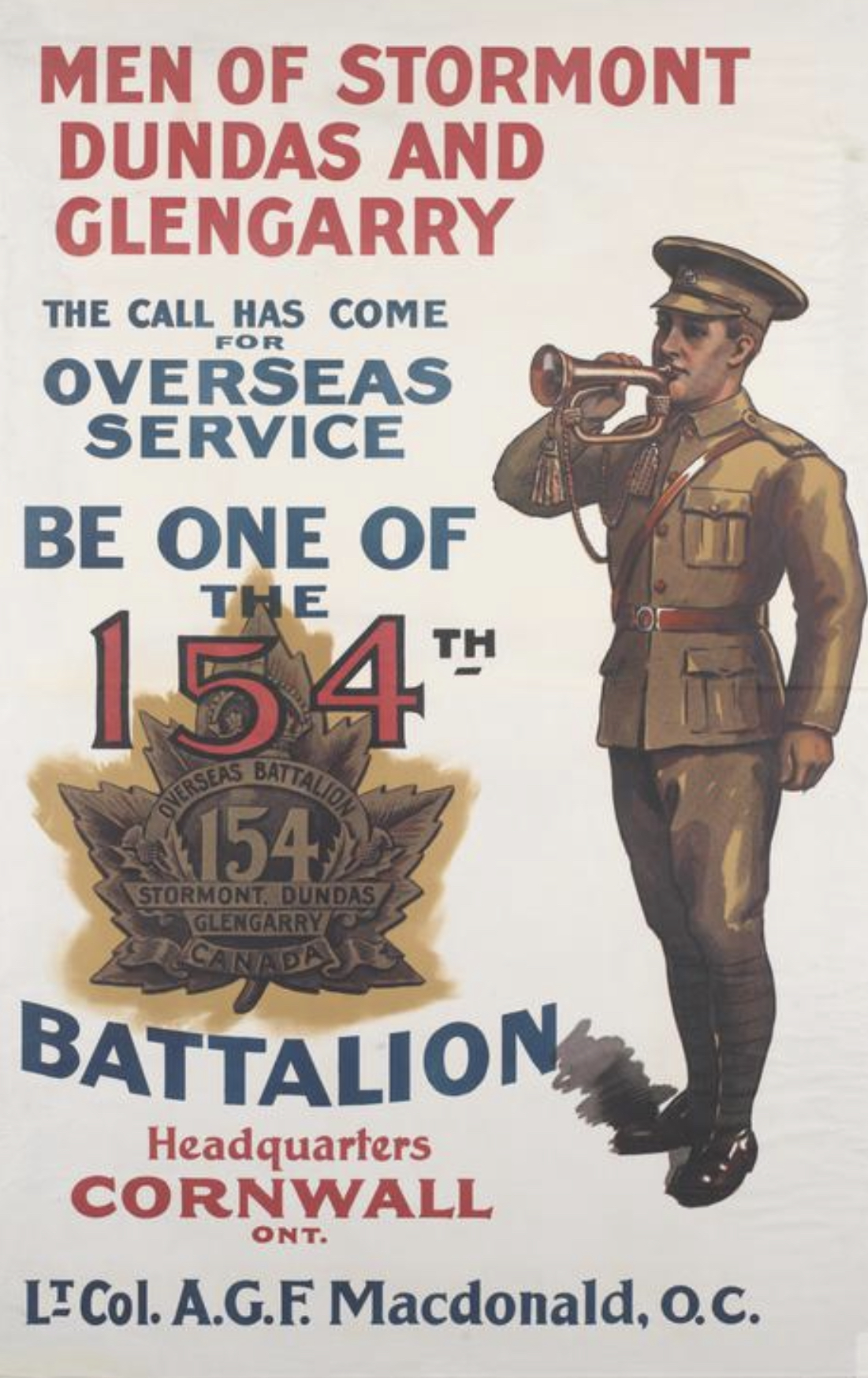
- Recruiting poster for the 154th Battalion
- Active: 1915–1917
- Country: Canada
- Type: Infantry (Highlanders)
- Mobilization headquarters: Cornwall, Ontario
- Engagements: First World War: St. Lawrence Canal Patrol 1914-15; England 1916-17

Commanders
- Notable commanders: Lt-Col. Alexander G.F. Macdonald

The 154th Battalion, CEF was a unit in the Canadian Expeditionary Force during the First World War. Based in Cornwall, Ontario, the unit began recruiting in late 1915 from the 59th Stormont and Glengarry Regiment and in Stormont, Dundas, and Glengarry Counties. The battalion is perpetuated by the Stormont, Dundas and Glengarry Highlanders.

== Outbreak of war ==
With the outbreak of the First World War on August 4, 1914, guards and pickets from the Canadian Militia were placed along the St. Lawrence River canal system and at public buildings in Stormont, Dundas, and Glengarry counties. The following positions were guarded by the militia:

Militia pickets 1914
| Regiment | Company | Location |
|---|---|---|
| 4th Hussars of Canada | 'D' Squadron | Mounted patrol from Prescott to Cornwall |
| 56th Grenville Regiment | | Guard at the Iroquois and Cardinal locks |
| 59th Stormont and Glengarry Regiment | 'A' and 'B' Companies | Guard at the Morrisburg lock, Farran's Point, and Cornwall |

On August 8, Lieutant-Colonel Alexander G.F. Macdonald, commanding officer of the 59th Regiment and son of Donald Alexander Macdonald, was appointed to command of all troops on guard duty from Prescott to Cornwall and established his headquarters in Morrisburg. By October, there were 22 officers and 258 men detailed for guard duty on the St. Lawrence Canal Patrol. Men from Stormont, Dundas, and Glengarry served on duty along the St. Lawrence and with other CEF battalions until late 1915, when authorization was given to raise an overseas battalion within the counties.

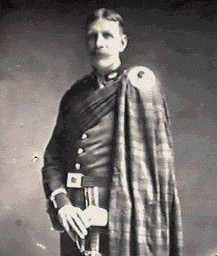
Col. Macdonald, commanding officer of the 154th Battalion

On November 5, 1915, Parliament approved the recruitment of 150,000 more men for the CEF, and on December 1, Macdonald was asked to form the 154th Overseas Battalion of men from Stormont, Dundas, Glengarry, Prescott, and Russell counties. Macdonald served as commanding officer, with Major W.H. Magwood of the 59th Stormont and Glengarry Regiment serving as second-in-command.

== Training ==
Recruitment was conducted throughout the harsh winter of 1915–16, and the officers often used a horse-drawn sled or cutter to traverse the snow-covered roads of the counties. Officers were sent to the major village centres in each county to recruit and the following officers were sent:

Recruiting locations 1915–1916
| Location | Recruiting officers |
|---|---|
| Cornwall | Capt. G.A. McNaughton; Lt. J.R. MacDonald; Lt. B.L. Irwin |
| Alexandria | Capt. J.A. Gillies; Lt. A.D. McInnes |
| Maxville | Lt. G.D. Gillie |
| St. Andrews | Lt. A.H. Wylie |
| Martintown and Williamstown | Lt. W. Govan; Lt. J.A. Raymond |
| Morrisburg | Capt. E.J. Glasgow |
| Iroquois | Lt. W. Thwaite |
| Winchester | Lt. F.S. Broder |
| Chesterville | Lt. W.J. Baker |
| Mountain | Lt. W.J. Franklin |
| Hawkesbury | Maj. J.A. Cameron; Lt. D.J. MacDonald |
| Vankleek Hill | Lt. J.L. Stevenson |
| Russell | Lt. R.W. Porteous |

Throughout the winter, the various village detachments trained as best was possible, and on May 31, 1916, the entire battalion concentrated at Barriefield Camp with 1150 men of all ranks present. At Barriefield, the battalion was brigaded with the 155th (Belleville-Quite) Battalion and the 156th (Leeds and Grenville) Battalion.

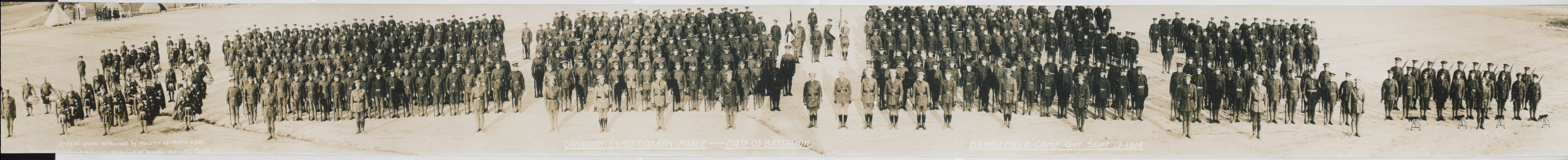
154th Battalion, Barriefield Camp, Ontario, Sept. 13, 1916

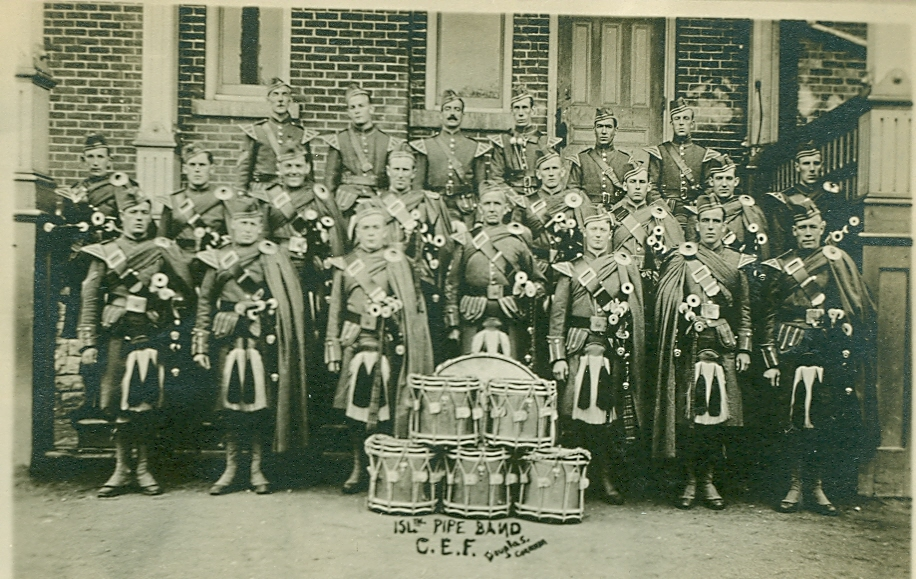
Pipe Band of the 154th, c.1916

At this time a battalion pipe band was raised and funded by John McMartin. Throughout the summer of 1916, the men trained in camp and conducted marches to Collins Bay and Gananoque before returning to Cornwall on August 23. Upon their return to Cornwall on August 23, the battalion paraded to St. Lawrence Park, where the IODE presented them with a set of colours.

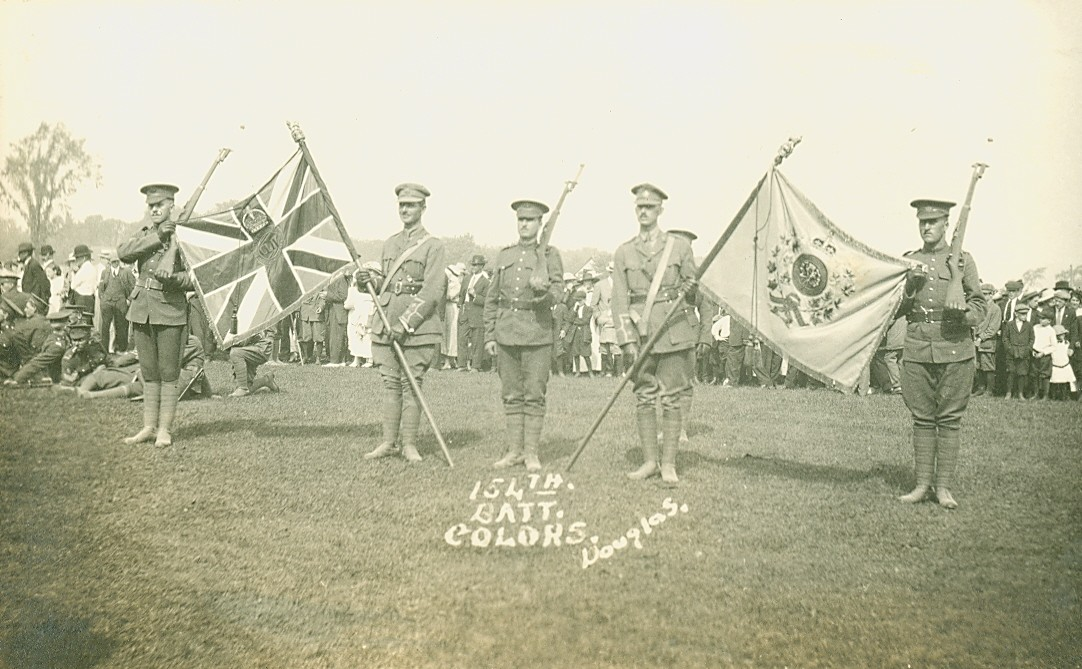
Presentation of colours to the 154th, August 1916

On September 14, 1916, the battalion, consisting of 27 officers and 928 other ranks, was inspected by Maj.-Gen. F.L. Lessard and pronounced fit for overseas duty. On October 5, the battalion was restyled as the 154th Overseas Battalion, Highlanders in honour of the Scottish history of SD&G, and was finally ready to proceed overseas.

== Overseas ==
The 154th Battalion boarded the trains at Kingston on October 21, 1916, arriving in Halifax on October 24 and embarking on the HMT Mauretania the night of October 25–26. The battalion docked in Liverpool, England, on October 31 and marched through the pouring rain to Bramshott Camp.

In England, the battalion conducted daily training consisting of physical training, bayonet fighting, squad drill, platoon and company drill, musketry, anti-gas drills, entrenching, field works, and route marching. Men from the battalion were detached to other CEF battalions as reinforcements were required for the front lines.

Throughout their service in England, the 154th Battalion was stationed at Bramshott, Whitley, and East Sandling military camps from November 1916 to January 1917. On January 31, 1917, the battalion was broken up and absorbed into the 6th Reserve Battalion at East Sandling. The officers and men of the 154th Battalion served in combat in the following front line units:

Front-line battalions of the soldiers from the 154th Battalion
| Battalion | Number of 154th Battalion men |
|---|---|
| 1st Infantry Battalion | 10 |
| 2nd Infantry Battalion | 156 |
| 3rd Infantry Battalion | 4 |
| 21st Infantry Battalion | 182 |
| 22nd Infantry Battalion | 17 |
| Princess Patricia's Canadian Light Infantry | 46 |
| 4th Canadian Mounted Rifles | 120 |
| 58th Infantry Battalion | 20 |
| 47th Infantry Battalion | 17 |
| 38th Infantry Battalion | 110 |
| Machine gun battalions | 32 |

== Post-War ==
The Stormont, Dundas and Glengarry Highlanders perpetuate the 154th Battalion and its battle honours.

Battle casualties from the men of the 154th Battalion were:

Casualties
| Type of Casualty | Number |
|---|---|
| Killed in action or died of wounds | 143 |
| Wounded | 397 (78 men were wounded more than once) |

Decorations awarded to men of the 154th Battalion were:

Medals and Decorations
| Decoration | Number |
|---|---|
| Military Cross | 7 |
| Distinguished Conduct Medal | 1 |
| Military Medal | 15 (including 1 bar) |
| Meritorious Service Medal | 1 |

Five officers of the 154th Battalion subsequently served as the Commanding Officer of the Stormont, Dundas and Glengarry Highlanders:

- Lt-Col. W.H. Magwood V.D. (1920–24)
- Lt-Col. J.A. Gillies V.D. (1924–29)
- Lt-Col. F.G. Robinson M.C., V.D. (1929–32)
- Lt-Col. W.J. Franklin M.C., V.D. (1932–34)
- Lt-Col. G.D. Gillie M.C., E.D. (1938–1940)

== Battle honours ==
For its service in England the 154th Overseas Battalion Highlanders, CEF, was awarded the battle honour

- The Great War, 1916-17

For the services of the men of the 154th Battalion, the Stormont, Dundas and Glengarry Highlanders were awarded the following battle honours:

- Hill 70
- Ypres, 1917
- Amiens
- Arras, 1918
- Hindenburg Line
- Pursuit to Mons
