= Darby Bergin =

Canadian politician

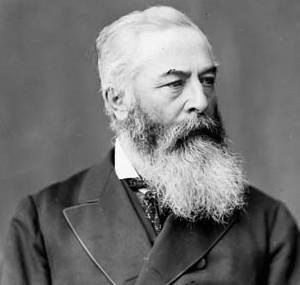

Member of Parliament for Cornwall
- In office 1872–1874
- Preceded by: John Sandfield Macdonald
- Succeeded by: Alexander Francis Macdonald

Member of Parliament for Cornwall and Stormont
- In office 1882–1896
- Preceded by: Riding established
- Succeeded by: John Goodall Snetsinger

Surgeon General of Canada
- In office 1885–1896
- Preceded by: Position established
- Succeeded by: John Louis Hubert Neilson

Personal details
- Born: September 7, 1826 York, Upper Canada
- Died: October 22, 1896 (aged 70) Cornwall, Ontario
- Party: Liberal-Conservative
- Occupation: Soldier, politician, physician

Military service
- Allegiance: Upper Canada; Canada
- Branch/service: Canadian militia
- Years of service: 1850 - 1885
- Rank: Captain; Major; Colonel; Surgeon General
- Unit: 3rd Stormont Militia (1850-51); 4th Stormont Militia (1851-62)
- Commands: 1st Cornwall Rifle Company (1862-68); 59th Stormont and Glengarry Battalion (1868-85); North-West Field Force Medical Services (1885)
- Battles/wars: Trent Affair; Fenian Raids; North-West Rebellion

Colonel Darby Bergin (September 7, 1826 – October 22, 1896) was an Ontario physician and political figure. He represented Cornwall from 1872 to 1874 and from 1878 to 1882 and then Cornwall and Stormont from 1882 to 1896 in the House of Commons of Canada as a Liberal-Conservative member. He was the 1st Canadian Surgeon General.

== Early life ==
Darby Bergin was born in York (later Toronto), Upper Canada in 1826, the son of William Bergin, a York merchant who had immigrated from Ireland. He studied at Upper Canada College and McGill College, receiving his MD.CM in 1847. Bergin set up practice at Cornwall. He was founder and president of the Eastern District Medical Association, president of the St. Lawrence and Eastern District Medical Association and examiner for the College of Physicians and Surgeons of Ontario, also serving president of the council for the college from 1881 to 1882 and from 1885 to 1886. With his brother John, he also raised horses and cattle.

== Political career ==
Bergin represented Cornwall from 1872 to 1874 and from 1878 to 1882 and then Cornwall and Stormont from 1882 to 1896 in the House of Commons of Canada as a Liberal-Conservative member. He was defeated by Alexander Francis Macdonald, the brother of Donald Alexander Macdonald, in 1874. He opposed the Canada Temperance Act of 1878, feeling that, in the end, it increased, rather than prevented, the consumption of alcohol. Bergin also introduced private member's bills to regulate working conditions for women and children, even though it was believed by some that labour regulations fell under provincial control; his efforts led to the introduction of legislation regulating labour conditions in Ontario factories.

With Joseph Kerr, he promoted the development of the Ontario Pacific Railway, serving as president from 1886 until his death in 1896, when his brother John succeeded him. Bergin also helped promote the expansion of the Cornwall Canal.

== Military career ==
Bergin was very active with the Canadian Militia. He was appointed a Surgeon in the 3rd Battalion, Stormont Militia in 1850 and in 1851 transferred to the 4th Battalion. In 1862 during the Trent Affair, he raised and commanded the 1st Cornwall Rifle Company, which served on active duty as No. 3 Company, 3rd Provisional Battalion, in La Prairie from December 1863 to April 1864, and during the St. Albans Raid.

He commanded the company on active duty in Cornwall during the Fenian Raid in 1866, and when the 59th Stormont and Glengarry Battalion was created on July 3, 1868, Major Bergin was appointed the first Commanding Officer. He commanded the battalion in the garrison at Cornwall during the Fenian Raid of 1870, and remained in command of the regiment until 1885. He was succeeded by Colonel J.H. Bredin.

On April 1, 1885, Colonel Bergin was appointed to command of the medical services for the North-West Field Force that was mobilizing for service in the North-West Rebellion. He was appointed Surgeon General and served with Middleton's expedition in 1885. Although he was unsuccessful in persuading the government to create a permanent militia medical corps following the North-West Rebellion, the Royal Canadian Army Medical Corps was later established in 1904.

== Death ==
On October 22, 1896, Darby Bergin died in Cornwall while still in office after succumbing to an unidentified illness.

== Electoral record ==
1878 Canadian federal election: Cornwall
| Party | Candidate | Votes |
|---|---|---|
| Liberal–Conservative | Darby Bergin | 575 |
| Liberal | Donald McLennan | 537 |
Source: Canadian Elections Database

On Mr. Bergin being unseated on petition, 24 December 1879:

By-election on 27 January 1880
| Party | Candidate | Votes |
| Liberal–Conservative | BERGIN, Darby | 624 |
| Liberal | MCLENNNAN, D.B. | 447 |
