= Occupation of Cornwall =

- Part of War of 1812
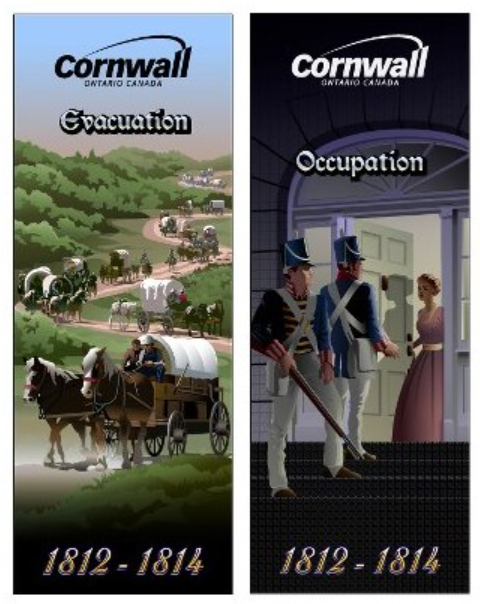
- Bicentennial banners commemorating the evacuation and occupation of Cornwall
Date	November 11–13, 1813
Location	Cornwall, Stormont County, Upper Canada
Result	American Withdrawal; Defeat of the Campaign against Montreal

Belligerents
United Kingdom; Upper Canada; Mohawk	United States

Commanders and leaders
Col. Neil McLean	Gen. James Wilkinson; Gen. John Boyd; Maj. Benjamin Forsyth

Units involved
1st Regiment of Stormont Militia; St. Regis Mohawk Warriors; Glengarry Militia	Wilkinson's Army; Boyd's Command

Strength
200+	1,500+

Casualties and losses
No casualties	Several prisoners

The Occupation of Cornwall was the capture and occupation of the town of Cornwall, Ontario, during the War of 1812, following the Battle of Crysler's Farm.

== Background ==
The American army under Gen. Boyd, defeated by the British at Crysler's Farm on November 11, continued advancing towards Cornwall, unpursued by Morrison's force. Boyd had hoped to meet up with the remainder of Wilkinson's flotilla who had descended the St. Lawrence River through the Long Sault Rapids, and continue their combined advance to Montreal.

Morrison's force was exhausted from the battle and remained encamped at John Crysler's farm, with only small patrols sent out to harass the American rear guard.

== Evacuation ==
The inhabitants and soldiers of Cornwall had largely evacuated and removed the strategic military supplies to Martintown while the armies had fought at Hoople's Creek and Crysler's Farm, and the town was left to be defended by the 1st Stormont Militia and native warriors from St. Regis.

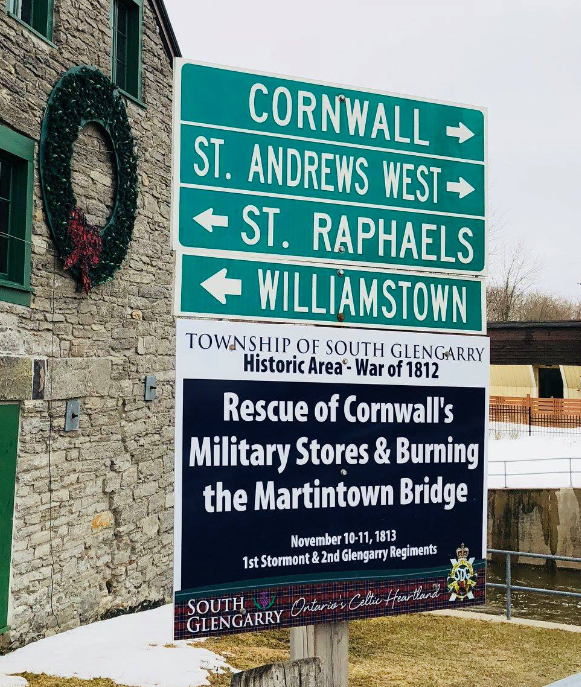
Sign commemorating the evacuation of military supplies from Cornwall to Martintown in 1813

The Stormont Militia loaded the military supplies onto 150 wagons and left Cornwall late on the night of November 10. The wagons were driven through St. Andrews to Martintown and was intended to be transported to the safety of the Fort at Coteau-du-Lac. When the supplies arrived in Martintown, the Stormont and Glengarry Militia burned the Martintown bridge to prevent an American force from pursuing and capturing them.

== Occupation ==
Early on the morning of November 11, the 2nd U.S. Light Dragoons occupied Barnhart's Island and the western end of Cornwall. The small force of militia and native warriors were driven back by the Dragoons and elements of Boyd's advance regiments. The American officers began occupying local farmhouses while the soldiers encamped in the fields of the town.

Facing a population of largely women and children, the Americans were remained civil, however some of the soldiers believed they should raid the town and strip it of any vital supplies before proceeding to Montreal. Historian Jacob Pringle wrote that the Americans “looked very little like soldiers … most of whom appeared more anxious to get home than to fight.” Some of the soldiers looted the locality, and took food stores to eat. To fuel the fires in their encampments, “every stick of fence on farms was burned”. The possibility that the Americans would sack and burn the town before abandoning it was a real threat, but the American officers reassured the townspeople that the town would be safe.

Local legend tells that Peggy O'Sullivan Bruce, who operated the St. Andrew's and St. Patrick's Tavern in Cornwall, was questioned by the occupying Americans how to get to Martintown so that they might capture the military supplies that had been evacuated. Bruce told them to follow the road to St. Andrews, and then go east until they reached Martintown, but: "She implored them to be careful as the Priest’s Bush south of St. Andrews was full of British Regulars and Glengarry militia and far the worst of all the St. Regis Indians who were waiting to scalp all good Americans who came by. She dwelt earnestly on the blood-thirsty ways of the Indians and the unpleasantness of being scalped", relates a local historian, "There wasn’t a soldier or an Indian within miles of St. Andrews but the Americans did not know that and they gave up the intended attack on Martintown, saving the vital supplies".

On November 12, Wilkinson himself landed in Cornwall and learned that Gen. Hampton would not make the rendezvous at St. Regis, having retreated with his army to the safety of Plattsburgh. Wilkinson was infuriated and hastily convened a war council in Cornwall with Boyd, Macomb, and his other generals, deciding that it would be impossible to advance and capture Montreal alone. The Americans would instead cross back across the St. Lawrence River and go into winter quarters at French Mills on the Salmon River.

== Aftermath ==
With the campaign to capture Montreal cancelled, Wilkinson's army began to abandon Cornwall, with the 2nd Dragoons and U.S. Artillery being ferried across the river throughout the afternoon and evening of November 12. The main American army began to cross the river on the morning of the 13th, and the last regiment to cross from Cornwall was the 15th U.S. Infantry from Brown's 2nd Brigade.

As the Americans were embarking and leaving Cornwall, the Stormont and Glengarry Militias were observing from the woods just beyond the town. As the last elements began to cross, a force of Glengarry Militia charged and captured some American cavalrymen, keeping the horses for themselves.

Thus the occupation of Cornwall was over and the last hope for an American victory on the St. Lawrence front during the war was dashed, but the bases on the Salmon River and at Madrid would be subjected to British raids early in 1814, and the war would continue for a further year and half.

A wooden fort was constructed on the edge of the town to guard against any future attacks, and in the 1830s a stronger, stone fort was built and named Fort Augustus. The fort was manned during the Rebellion of 1838.
