= Cornwall and Stormont =

Former federal electoral district in Ontario, Canada

Cornwall and Stormont was a federal electoral district represented in the House of Commons of Canada from 1882 to 1904. It was located in the province of Ontario. This riding was created in 1882 from parts of Cornwall and Stormont ridings.

It consisted of the town of Cornwall and the townships of Cornwall, Osnabruck, Finch and Roxborough.

The electoral district was abolished in 1903 when it was merged into Stormont riding.

== Members of Parliament ==
This riding elected the following members of Parliament:

Parliament	Years	Member	Party
Riding created from Cornwall and Stormont
5th	1882–1887	Darby Bergin	Liberal–Conservative
6th	1887–1891	Darby Bergin	Liberal–Conservative
7th	1891–1896	Darby Bergin	Liberal–Conservative
8th	1896–1896	Darby Bergin	Liberal–Conservative
8th	1896–1900	John Goodall Snetsinger	Liberal
9th	1900–1904	Robert Abercrombie Pringle	Conservative
Riding dissolved into Stormont

== Election results ==
1882 Canadian federal election
Party	Candidate	Votes
Liberal–Conservative	Darby Bergin	1,819
Unknown	James Bethune	1,370

1887 Canadian federal election
Party	Candidate	Votes
Liberal–Conservative	Darby Bergin	2,077
Liberal	Donald B. McLennan	1,906

1891 Canadian federal election
Party	Candidate	Votes
Liberal–Conservative	Darby Bergin	2,152
Liberal	John Goodall Snetsinger	1,934

1896 Canadian federal election
Party	Candidate	Votes
Liberal–Conservative	BERGIN, Darby	1,838
Patrons of Industry	ADAMS, John G.	1,513
Liberal	SNETSINGER, John G.	1,456

On Mr. Bergin's death, 22 October 1896:

By-election on 19 December 1896
Party	Candidate	Votes
Liberal	SNETSINGER, J.G.	2,617
Conservative	LEITCH, James	2,025

1900 Canadian federal election
Party	Candidate	Votes
Conservative	PRINGLE, Robert A.	2,562
Liberal	MULHERN, Ambrose F.	2,411

== See also ==
- List of Canadian electoral districts
- Historical federal electoral districts of Canada
