= Stormont (Province of Canada electoral district) =

Canadian parliamentary electoral district

Stormont Canada West
Province of Canada electoral district

Defunct pre-Confederation electoral district
- Legislature: Legislative Assembly of the Province of Canada
- District created: 1841
- District abolished: 1867
- First contested: 1841
- Last contested: 1863

Stormont was an electoral district of the Legislative Assembly of the Parliament of the Province of Canada, in Canada West (now Ontario). It was created in 1841, upon the establishment of the Province of Canada by the union of Upper Canada and Lower Canada. Stormont was represented by one member in the Legislative Assembly. It was abolished in 1867, upon the creation of Canada and the province of Ontario.

== Boundaries ==
Stormont electoral district was based on Stormont County, Canada West (now part of the United Counties of Stormont, Dundas and Glengarry, Ontario). It was located in the eastern part of Canada West, on the Saint Lawrence River.

The Union Act, 1840 had merged the two provinces of Upper Canada and Lower Canada into the Province of Canada, with a single Parliament. The separate parliaments of Lower Canada and Upper Canada were abolished. The Union Act provided that the pre-existing electoral boundaries of Upper Canada would continue to be used in the new Parliament, unless altered by the Union Act itself.

Stormont County had been an electoral district in the Legislative Assembly of Upper Canada, and its boundaries were not altered by the Union Act. Those boundaries had originally been set by a proclamation of the first Lieutenant Governor of Upper Canada, John Graves Simcoe, in 1792:

That the second of the said counties be hereafter called by the name of the county of Stormont; which county is to be bounded on the east by the westernmost line of the county of Glengary, on the south by the river St. Lawrence, to the westernmost boundary of the late township of Osnaburg, and on the west by the easternmost boundary line of the late township of Williamsburgh, running north twenty-four degrees west until it intersects the Ottawa or Grand river, then descending the said river until it meets the northwesternmost boundary of the county of Glengary. The said county of Stormont is to comprehend all the islands in the said river St. Lawrence nearest to the said county, in the whole or greater part fronting the same.

The boundaries had been further defined by a statute of Upper Canada in 1798:

That the townships of Cornwall, Osnaburg, Finch and Roxburg, together with such of the Islands in the river Saint Lawrence as are wholly or in greater part opposite thereto, shall constitute and form the County of Stormont.

The effect of these boundaries was to reduce the size of Stormont County, with several townships removed to form the new Russell County, Ontario.

Since Stormont County was not changed by the Union Act, those boundaries continued to be used for the new electoral district. Stormont electoral district was represented by one member in the Legislative Assembly.

== Members of the Legislative Assembly ==
Stormont was represented by one member in the Legislative Assembly. The following were the members for Stormont.

Parliament	Years	Members	Party
1st Parliament; 1841–1844	1841–1844	Alexander McLean	Moderate Tory

== Abolition ==
Stormont electoral district was abolished on July 1, 1867, when the British North America Act, 1867 came into force, creating Canada and splitting the Province of Canada into Quebec and Ontario. It was succeeded by two electoral districts named Stormont, one in the House of Commons of Canada and one in the Legislative Assembly of Ontario.
