= Archibald McLean (judge) =

Canadian politician

The Honourable Archibald McLean
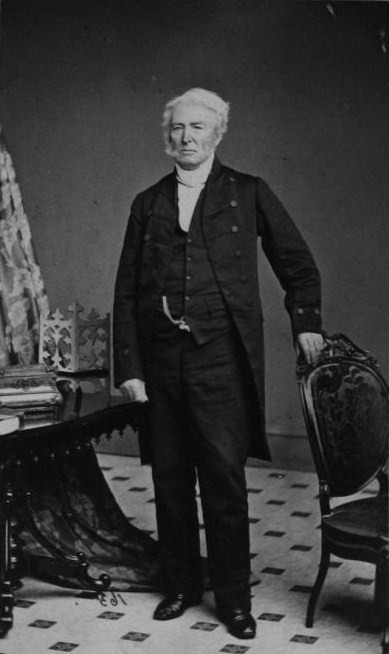

Speaker of the Legislative Assembly of Upper Canada
- In office 1831–1834
- Preceded by: Marshall Spring Bidwell
- Succeeded by: Marshall Spring Bidwell

Speaker of the Legislative Assembly of Upper Canada
- In office 1836–1836
- Preceded by: Marshall Spring Bidwell
- Succeeded by: Allan MacNab

Personal details
- Born: April 5, 1791 St. Andrews, Ontario, Canada
- Died: October 24, 1865 (aged 74) Toronto, Ontario, Canada
- Parent: Neil McLean (father)
- Relatives: Alexander McLean (brother)
- Military Service
- Allegiance: Upper Canada
- Branch: Canadian Militia
- Service years: 1812-14; 1837
- Rank: Subaltern; Colonel
- Units: 3rd Regiment of York Militia; Toronto Volunteers
- Conflicts: War of 1812; Battle of Queenston Heights (WIA); Battle of Lundy's Lane; Upper Canada Rebellion; Battle of Montgomery's Tavern

Archibald McLean (April 5, 1791 – October 24, 1865) was a Canadian lawyer, judge and politician who was the speaker of the Legislative Assembly of Upper Canada from 1831 to 1834 and in 1836.

== Early life ==
McLean was born at St. Andrews in the Lunenburg District in 1791, the son of Lt.-Col. The Hon. Neil McLean and Isabella McDonell of Leek. He studied at John Strachan's school in Cornwall and articled in law with William Firth.

== War of 1812 ==
On the outbreak of the War of 1812 he joined the 3rd Regiment of York Militia as a Subaltern and was seriously wounded at the Battle of Queenston Heights. He was carried from the battlefield to a nearby village by John Cawthra where his wounds were hurriedly dressed. Because of an infection caused by the late removal of a bullet he was not fit to fight when the Americans attacked York in April, 1813. McLean buried the York militia's colours in the woods and escaped to Kingston, Ontario. He fought again at Battle of Lundy's Lane but was captured by the Americans and held prisoner for the remainder of the war.

== Politics ==
In 1815 he turned down a commission into the British regular army, joining the law firm of William Warren Baldwin before starting his own lucrative law firm in Cornwall, Ontario. In 1820, he was elected to the Legislative Assembly of Upper Canada for Stormont; he held that seat until 1834, shared for the previous four years with his old school friend Philip VanKoughnet. He served as Speaker of the Legislative Assembly, 1831-1834.

He was then elected to represent Cornwall in 1834 and served a second term as Speaker of the Assembly in the 1836 session. He was a leading Tory member and advocated the rights of the Presbyterian Church to be equal to those of the Church of England. Elected for the sixth time in 1836, this time again for Stormont, he soon thereafter is appointed to the Legislative Council and to the King's Bench.

== Upper Canada Rebellion ==
He was named colonel in the militia during the Upper Canada Rebellion and commanded the left flank of the loyalist forces under Colonel James FitzGibbon at the Battle of Montgomery's Tavern. McLean initially opposed the Union of Upper and Lower Canada out of fear that Upper Canadians would be dominated by French Canadians. He saw responsible government as a danger to the British connection and to the ordered freedom and the recognition of class and property of the British tradition, but he quickly adjusted to the new reality.

== Judicial career ==
Appointed to the Legislative Council in 1836, the following year he was named to the Court of King's Bench, his brother Alexander McLean taking his Stormont seat. From 1850 to 1856, he served in the Court of Common Pleas with Sir James Buchanan Macaulay and Robert Baldwin Sullivan.

In the Extradition case of John Anderson, the fugitive slave, McLean argued that 'in administering the laws of a British province, I can never feel bound to recognize as law any enactment which can convert into chattels a very large number of the human race.'

In 1862, he was appointed chief justice of the Court of Queen's Bench for Upper Canada. In 1863, he was appointed judge of the Court of Error and Appeal. For many years McLean had served as president of the St Andrew's Society of Toronto.

He married Joan McPherson and they were the parents of seven children. He died in Toronto in 1865 and was honoured with a public funeral. The Upper Canada Law Journal wrote,

Upon the bench was dignified and courteous; unsuspicious and utterly devoid of anything mean or petty in his own character, his conduct to others was always what he expected from them.

Preceded by Marshall Spring Bidwell	Speaker of the Legislative Assembly of Upper Canada; 1831–1834	Succeeded by Marshall Spring Bidwell

Preceded by Marshall Spring Bidwell	Speaker of the Legislative Assembly of Upper Canada; 1836	Succeeded by Allan MacNab
