= Alexander McLean (Province of Canada politician) =

Canadian politician (1793–1875)

Member of the Legislative Assembly of Upper Canada for Stormont County
- In office 1837–1840 Serving with Donald Æneas MacDonell
- Preceded by: Archibald McLean
- Succeeded by: Position abolished

Member of the Legislative Assembly of the Province of Canada for Stormont
- In office 1841–1844
- Preceded by: New position
- Succeeded by: Donald Æneas MacDonell

Member of the Legislative Assembly of the Province of Canada for Stormont
- In office 1847–1851
- Preceded by: Donald Æneas MacDonell
- Succeeded by: William Mattice

Personal details
- Born: February 14, 1793 St. Andrews, Upper Canada
- Died: April 16, 1875 (aged 82) Cornwall, Ontario
- Party: Sydenham Tory
- Relations: Archibald McLean
- Parent: Lt. Col. Neil McLean (father)
- Occupation: Lawyer, landowner, businessman

Military service
- Allegiance: Britain
- Branch/service: Upper Canada militia
- Rank: Lieutenant
- Battles/wars: War of 1812

Alexander McLean (February 14, 1793 – April 16, 1875) was a political figure in Upper Canada and Canada West.

He was born in St. Andrews in Upper Canada in 1793, the son of Neil McLean. He studied with John Strachan in Cornwall and later settled on a farm near Cornwall. He served as a lieutenant in the local militia during the War of 1812. He was named justice of the peace in the Eastern District in 1832.

In 1837, McLean was elected in a by-election to represent his home county, Stormont, in the Legislative Assembly of Upper Canada. The by-election was triggered when his brother Archibald, who was the member for Stormont, resigned the seat to accept an appointment as judge.

Following the union of Upper Canada and Lower Canada into the Province of Canada in 1841, McLean was elected to represent Stormont in the new Legislative Assembly, serving from 1841 to 1844. In the Assembly, he was a moderate Tory. He voted in favour of the union at the first session, unlike the Compact Tories who were more closely aligned with the Family Compact. He also consistently voted to support measures proposed by the Governor General, Lord Sydenham, and on a key vote in 1843 relating to responsible government, he voted with the governor general, against the Reformers.

He was again elected in the general election of 1847, serving in the Legislative Assembly from 1848 to 1851.

He died in Cornwall in 1875.
