= Jacob Farrand Pringle =

Canadian judge, soldier, and politician

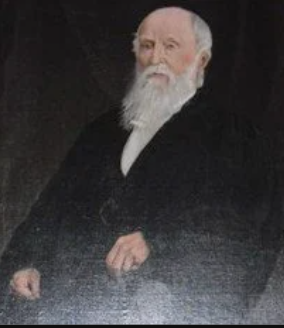

Mayor of Cornwall
- In office 1855–1856

Clerk of the Peace and County Attorney
- In office 1858–1866

Senior Judge of the County Court
- In office 1878–1900

Personal details
- Born: 27 June 1816 Valenciennes, France
- Died: 1 February 1901 (aged 84) Cornwall, Ontario
- Spouse: Isabella Fraser
- Relations: Col. Alexander Fraser (father-in-law); Robert Abercrombie Pringle (son)
- Profession: Judge, soldier, politician

Military service
- Allegiance: Canadian Militia
- Years of service: 1837 - 1866
- Rank: Private; Lieutenant; Captain
- Unit: Cornwall Volunteer Artillery (1838-50)
- Commands: Cornwall Infantry Company (1862-66)
- Battles/wars: Rebellion of 1838; Fenian Raids (1866)

Jacob Farrand Pringle (July 27, 1816 - February 1, 1901) was a Canadian judge, soldier, and politician in Cornwall.

== Early life ==
Jacob Farrand Pringle was born on June 27, 1816, in Valenciennes, France, to James Pringle and Ann Margaret Anderson.

His father, a Scotsman, was a Lieutenant in the 81st Regiment of Foot, then stationed in Valenciennes, who had previously served in the Napoleonic Wars and in Canada during the War of 1812. While serving in Stormont County in 1814, Lt. James Pringle met Ann Margaret Anderson, daughter of Col. Joseph Anderson. The couple were married in Cornwall in 1814 and in 1817 the family returned to settle near the town.

Jacob Pringle's maternal grandfather Col. Joseph Anderson, great-grandfather Capt. Samuel Anderson, and great-uncle Capt. Jacob Farrand all served as Loyalists in the King's Royal Regiment of New York during the American Revolution and in the Stormont and Dundas Militias during the 1790s and War of 1812.

== Political career ==
Pringle's father served as Clerk of the Peace for the United Counties of Stormont, Dundas and Glengarry for many years and inspired young Jacob to pursue politics and law. He studied law in Cornwall beginning in 1833 and in 1838 became an Attorney and Barrister, opening a practice in Cornwall.

He served as a town councilor for Cornwall from 1852 to 1854, and as Mayor of the town in 1855 and 1856. He was made Bencher of the Law Society in 1857 and then Clerk of the Peace and County Attorney from January 1858 to November 1866.

In 1866, he was appointed a Junior Judge for the County Court and in 1878 was appointed as the Senior Judge. In 1882 he was made Local Judge of the High Court, serving until March 1900. At the time of his retirement in 1900, he was the oldest judge in Canada.

== Family ==
In September 1844, he married Isabella Fraser (1825-1910), third daughter of Col. Alexander Fraser and Ann Macdonell. The couple had 10 children including Robert Abercrombie Pringle.

== Military career ==
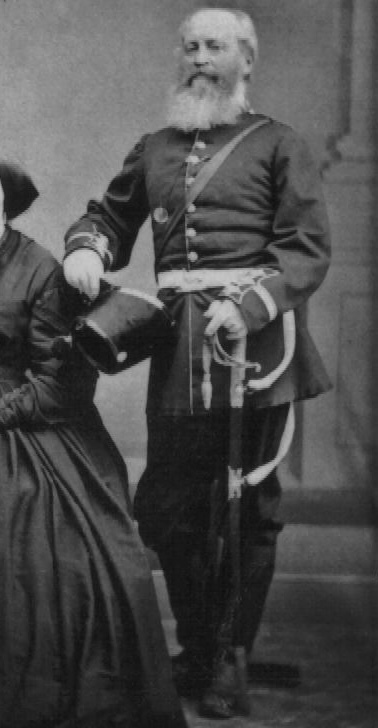
Capt. Pringle commanding the Cornwall Infantry Company, c.1863

Pringle was a prominent militiaman as well, serving as a private in the Cornwall Volunteer Artillery, commanded by his father. He was stationed at Coteau-du-Lac in 1837, and in Cornwall from December 1838 to April 1839 during the Rebellions of 1837–1838. When his father retired from the Cornwall Volunteer Artillery in March 1846, he was promoted to Second Lieutenant and made second in command of the company.

On November 14, 1862, he raised and commanded the Cornwall Infantry Company, serving during the Fenian Raid of 1866. For his services during the Fenian Raid he was awarded the Canada General Service Medal.

== Later life ==
He served many years as a School Trustee for Cornwall, was a Master Mason, Master in the IOOF, a Trustee and Elder in the Presbyterian Church, patron of the Cornwall Curling Club, and an early historian for the United Counties. He authored the local history book: Lunenburgh, or the old Eastern District in 1890.

Judge Pringle died in Cornwall on February 1, 1901.
