= Stormont, Dundas and Glengarry Highlanders =

- Regimental badge
- Active: 1868–present
- Country: Canada
- Branch: Canadian Army
- Type: Infantry
- Role: Light role
- Size: One battalion
- Part of: 33 Canadian Brigade Group
- Garrison/HQ: Cornwall Armoury, 505 Fourth Street East, Cornwall, Ontario
- Motto: Dileas gu bas (Scottish Gaelic for 'faithful unto death')
- March: "Bonnie Dundee"
- Anniversaries: Regimental Birthday 3 July
- Engagements: War of 1812; Rebellions of 1837–1838; Fenian raids; World War I; World War II; Afghanistan
- Battle honours: See #Battle honours

Commanders
- Honorary colonel: Kevin McCormick
- Honorary lieutenant-colonel: Vacant
- Commanding officer: LCol R.P. Hendy, CD
- Regimental sergeant major: CWO M. Gray, CD

Insignia
- Tartan: MacDonnell of Glengarry

Stormont, Dundas and Glengarry Highlanders is a Primary Reserve infantry regiment of the Canadian Army. It is part of 33 Canadian Brigade Group, 4th Canadian Division and is headquartered in Cornwall, Ontario.

== Regimental badge ==
Superimposed upon a background of thistle, leaves and flowers the letters "SDG"; below, a raven on a rock superimposed on a maple leaf. A half scroll to the left of the maple leaf is inscribed "dileas"; another to the right inscribed "gu bas"; above, a semi-annulus inscribed "Glengarry Fencibles" and surmounted by the Crown. The whole is superimposed upon Saint Andrew's cross.

== Lineage ==
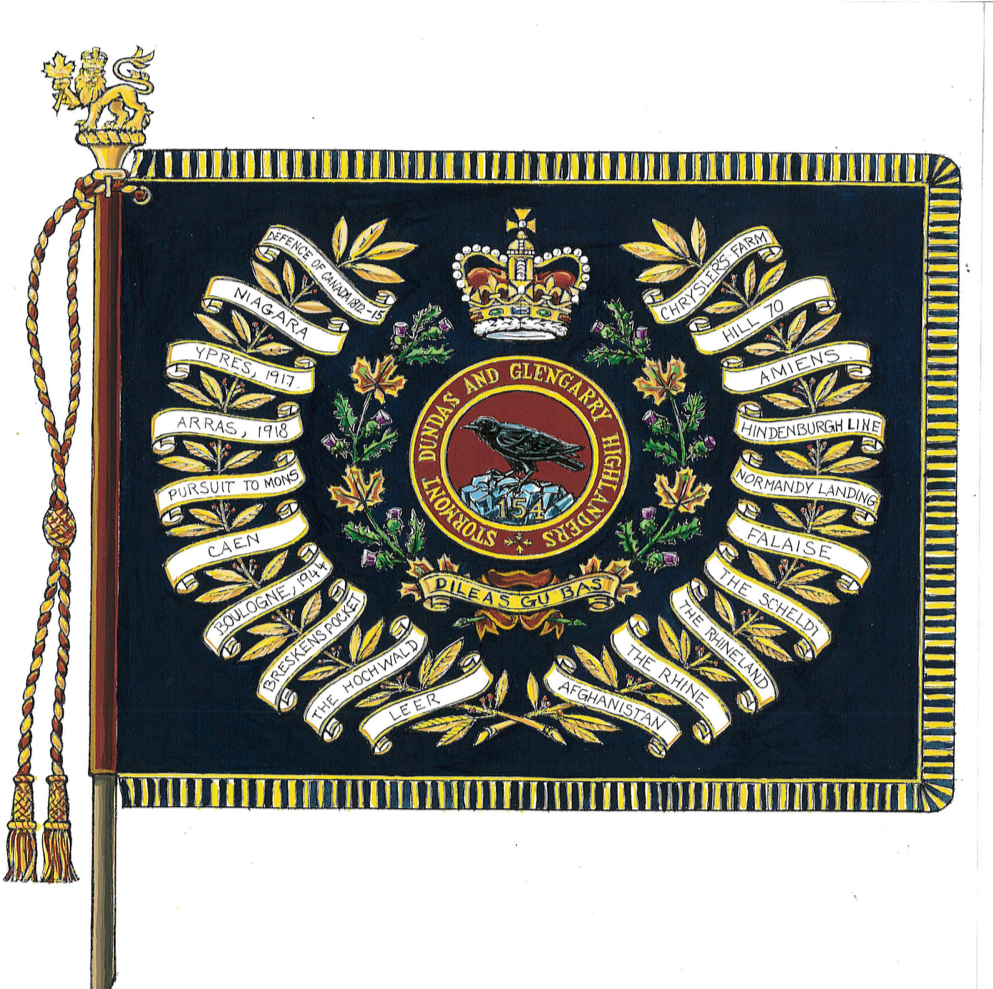
Regimental colour, with additional battle honours (2019).

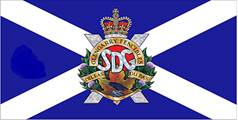
Regimental camp flag

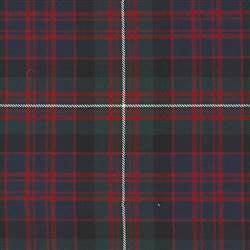
Regimental tartan- MacDonell of Glengarry (modern)

The Stormont, Dundas and Glengarry Highlanders was raised in Cornwall, Ontario, on 3 July 1868, as the 59th "Stormont and Glengarry" Battalion of Infantry. It was redesignated as the 59th "Stormont" Battalion of Infantry on 22 June 1883; as the 59th Stormont and Glengarry Battalion of Infantry on 23 March 1888; and as the 59th Stormont and Glengarry Regiment on 8 May 1900. Following the Great War it was redesignated as The Stormont and Glengarry Regiment on 12 March 1920; as The Stormont, Dundas and Glengarry Highlanders on 15 February 1922; as the 2nd (Reserve) Battalion, The Stormont, Dundas and Glengarry Highlanders on 7 November 1940; as The Stormont, Dundas and Glengarry Highlanders on 24 May 1946; and as The Stormont, Dundas and Glengarry Highlanders (Machine Gun) on 1 September 1954 before returning to its designation as the Stormont, Dundas and Glengarry Highlanders on 1 August 1959.

=== Lineage chart ===
Lineage chart

1812
1815
1862
1868
1870
1883
1888
1900
1915
1917
1920
1922
1936
1940
1940
1945
1946
1954
1959
2012

1st Regt of Dundas Militia
Disbanded
154th "Overseas" Bn, CEF
Absorbed by 6th Reserve Bn, CEF
The Stormont, Dundas and Glengarry Highlanders, CASF
1st Bn, The Stormont, Dundas and Glengarry Highlanders, CASF
Disbanded

1st and 2nd Regts of Glengarry Militia
Disbanded
Independent rifle and infy coys
59th "Stormont and Glengarry Bn of Infy"
Active service (Note: May–June)
59th "Stormont" Bn of Infy
59th Stormont and Glengarry Bn of Infy
59th Stormont and Glengarry Regt
1st Bn (154th Bn, CEF), The Stormont and Glengarry Regt
1st Bn (154th Bn, CEF), The Stormont, Dundas and Glengarry Highlanders
The Stormont, Dundas and Glengarry Highlanders
2nd (Reserve) Bn, The Stormont, Dundas and Glengarry Highlanders
The Stormont, Dundas and Glengarry Highlanders
The Stormont, Dundas and Glengarry Highlanders (MG)
Stormont, Dundas and Glengarry Highlanders
Perpetuates War of 1812 units

1st Regt of Prescott Militia
Disbanded
2nd Bn, (Note: Reserve) The Stormont and Glengarry Regt
2nd Bn, The Stormont, Dundas and Glengarry Highlanders
Disbanded
3rd Bn, The Stormont, Dundas and Glengarry Highlanders, CIC, CAOF
Disbanded

1st Regt of Stormont Militia
Disbanded

== Perpetuations ==
=== War of 1812 ===
- 1st Regiment of Dundas Militia
- 1st Regiment of Glengarry Militia
- 2nd Regiment of Glengarry Militia
- 1st Regiment of Prescott Militia
- 1st Regiment of Stormont Militia
- Glengarry Light Infantry

=== Great War ===
- 154th Battalion (Stormont-Dundas-Glengarry), CEF

== Operational history ==
=== Fenian Raids ===
In 1866, the various companies in the counties were called out for service along the St. Lawrence River frontier, serving at Prescott and Cornwall. The 59th Stormont and Glengarry Battalion was again called out on active service on 24 May 1870. It served on the St. Lawrence River frontier at Prescott and Cornwall until it was removed from active service on 1 June 1870.

=== Great War ===
Details of the 59th Stormont and Glengarry Regiment were placed on active service on 6 August 1914 for local protection duties.

The 154th (Stormont-Dundas-Glengarry) Battalion, CEF was authorized on 22 December 1915 and embarked for Great Britain on 25 October 1916 where it provided reinforcements for the Canadian Corps in the field until 31 January 1917, when its personnel were absorbed by the '6th Reserve Battalion, CEF'. The battalion was subsequently disbanded on 17 July 1917.

=== Second World War ===
Details from the regiment were called out on service on 26 August 1939 and then placed on active service on 1 September 1939, as The Stormont, Dundas and Glengarry Highlanders, CASF (Details), for local protection duties. Those details called out on active service were disbanded on 31 December 1940.

The regiment mobilized The Stormont, Dundas and Glengarry Highlanders, CASF (Canadian Active Service Force) for active service on 24 May 1940. It was redesignated as the 1st Battalion, The Stormont, Dundas and Glengarry Highlanders, CASF on 7 November 1940. The unit embarked for Great Britain on 19 July 1941. On D-Day, 6 June 1944, it landed in Normandy, France, as part of the 9th Infantry Brigade, 3rd Canadian Infantry Division, and it continued to fight in North West Europe until the end of the war. The overseas battalion was disbanded on 15 January 1946.

The regiment mobilized the 3rd Battalion, The Stormont, Dundas and Glengarry Highlanders, CIC, CAOF (Canadian Infantry Corps and Canadian Army Occupation Force) on 1 June 1945 for service with the Canadian Army Occupation Force in Germany. This battalion was disbanded on 24 May 1946.

=== Conflict in Afghanistan ===
The regiment contributed an aggregate of more than 20% of its authorized strength to the various Task Forces which served in Afghanistan between 2002 and 2014.

== History ==
After the surrender at Yorktown, veterans of the King's Royal Regiment of New York (KRRNY) and the 84th Regiment of Foot (Royal Highland Emigrants), were given land on the north bank of the St. Lawrence River so they could defend Upper Canada from the new enemy to the south. In 1804, veterans of the Glengarry Fencibles, a Highland regiment that served in Europe with the British Army, settled just north of the American Revolutionary War veterans. The first militia unit west of Montreal was organized at Cornwall in 1787 under the command of Major John Macdonnell, late of the KRRNY.

=== War of 1812 ===
When the War of 1812 broke out in June 1812, the Militiamen from the area gathered to prevent an invasion of their homeland and the companies were formed into the various county militias. These regiments fought throughout the war, with many men from the regiments being transferred to the Incorporated Battalion of Canadian Militia fighting in the Niagara Peninsula at the Battle of Lundy's Lane.

The militias of Stormont, Dundas, and Glengarry were on active duty within the counties and fought in battles in Dundas County, Stormont County, and New York. Their principle engagements were:

==== 1812 ====
- Battle of Matilda
- First Battle of Ogdensburg
- Battle of French Mills

==== 1813 ====
- Second Battle of Ogdensburg
- Battle of Point Iroquois
- Skirmish at Doran's Farm
- Battle of Hoople's Creek
- Battle of Crysler's Farm
- Occupation of Cornwall

==== 1814 ====
- Raid on Madrid
- Salmon River Raid

For a long time, breaks in unit continuity with the pre-Confederation period denied the regiment the "Niagara" battle honour and the status of oldest anglophone militia regiment in Canada. However, on the occasion of the bicentennial of the War of 1812 in 2012, the Government of Canada permitted Canadian regiments to perpetuate and officially commemorate 1812 militia and Fencible units thus awarding the Stormont, Dundas and Glengarry Highlanders three War of 1812 battle honours, including the battle honour NIAGARA which had been awarded to the Glengarry Light Infantry Fencibles.

After 1814, and Stormont and Dundas counties soon had two militia regiments each and Glengarry County had four.

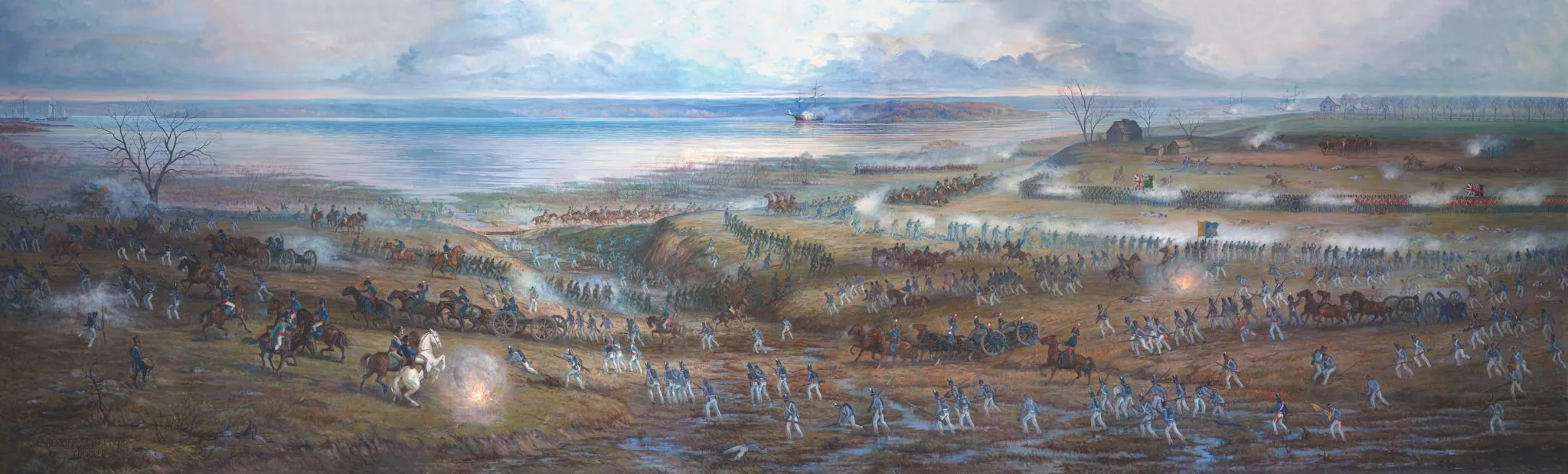
The Battle of Crysler's Farm

=== Rebellions of 1837–1838 ===
All units fought the rebels of 1837–1838, two in Lower Canada at the Battle of Beauharnois and three at the 1838 Battle of the Windmill, where ten militiamen were killed and thirteen wounded.

In 1852, the Department of Militia and Defence published general orders stipulating the uniform for officers of the sedentary militia. Orders published on 16 April 1852, dictate that the Glengarry Battalions of Militia will wear a highland bonnet, tartan scarf, and tartan trousers. Orders from 12 June state that the 3rd and 4th Stormont Battalions of Militia will likewise wear the highland uniform, and that the commanding officers will choose the tartan. This made the Glengarry and Stormont Battalions the first militia units in Canada to be authorized to wear highland uniform.

=== Fenian Raids ===
The 1855 Militia Act introduced voluntary service, and the United Counties raised many independent companies in 1862 following the Trent Affair. The volunteer militia regiments raised in the United Counties of Stormont, Dundas and Glengarry during the 1850s–1860s were:

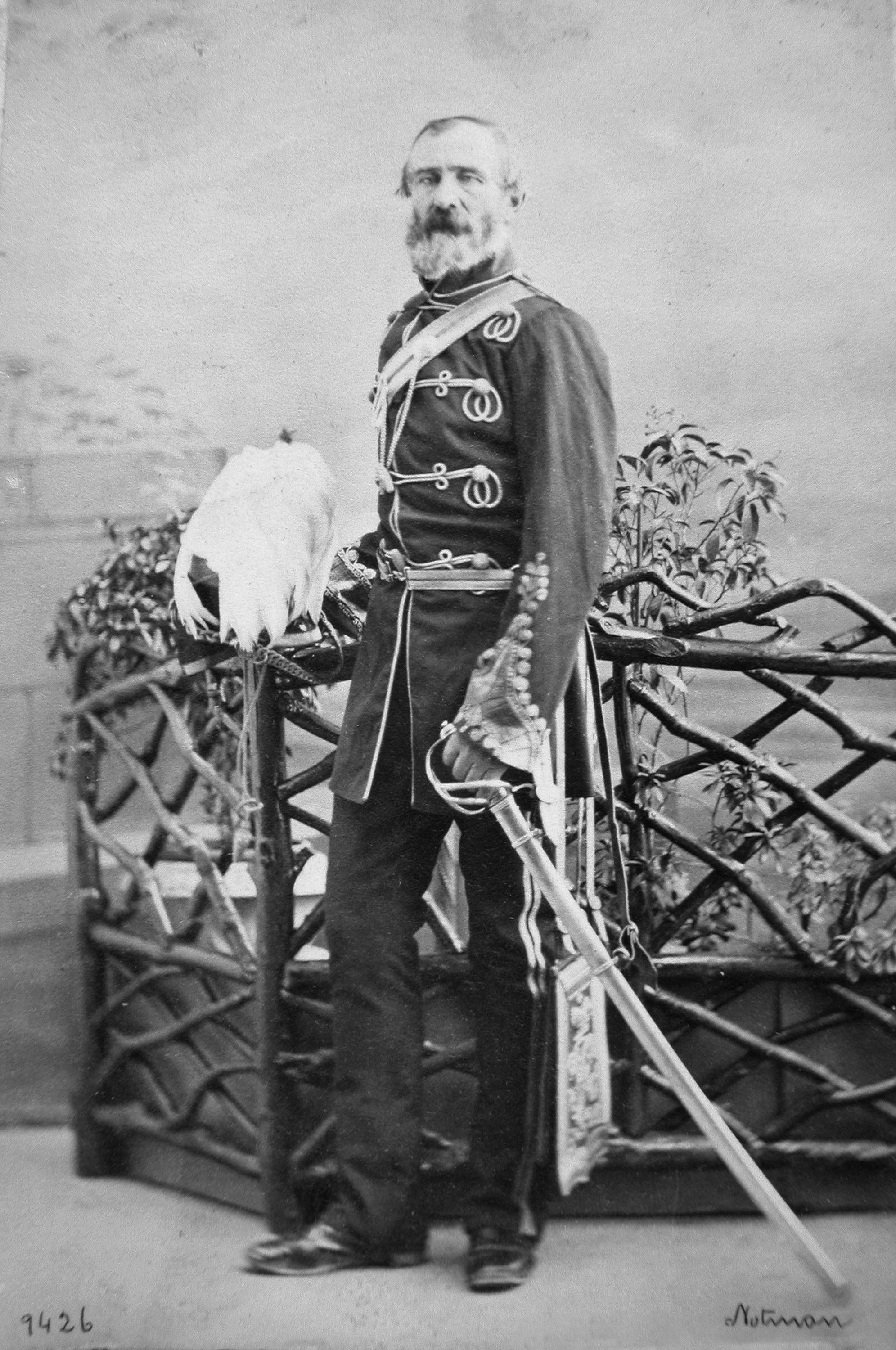
Captain William D. Wood, Cornwall Volunteer Cavalry, c. 1863

- Cornwall Troop of Volunteer Militia Cavalry – raised on 15 February 1856, under Captain James J. Dickinson, with Lieutenant William D. Wood and Cornet John Kewan. The troop provided an honour guard for the visit of the Prince of Wales to Dickinson's Landing in 1860. This troop was disbanded in March 1865
- Williamsburg Troop of Volunteer Militia Cavalry – raised on 16 October 1856, under Captain George W. Brouse, with Lieutenant J.A. Weegar and Cornet J.G. Merkley. This troop was disbanded in 1858
- 1st Volunteer Militia Rifle Company of Williamsburg – raised on 16 October 1856, under Captain Martin Carman, with Lieutenant William Gordon and Ensign William Casselman. Captain Carman was replaced by Captain James Holden in 1857. This company was disbanded in April 1864
- Morrisburg Rifle Company – raised on 22 January 1862, under Captain Alex. Farlinger, with Lieutenant Asaph B. Sherman and Ensign Charles P. Empey. This company was disbanded in November 1862
- 1st Volunteer Militia Rifle Company of Cornwall – raised on 22 January 1862, under Captain Darby Bergin, with Lieutenant James A. Macdonell and Ensign William McGillivray. Formed part of the 59th Battalion in 1868
- 2nd Volunteer Militia Rifle Company of Cornwall – raised on 31 January 1862, under Captain Edward Oliver, with Lieutenant George S. Jarvis and Ensign D.B. MacLennan. Formed part of the 59th Battalion in 1868
- Volunteer Militia Foot Artillery Company of Morrisburg – raised on 14 February 1862, under Captain Thomas S. Rubidge, with Lieutenant Henry G. Merkley and Second Lieutenant Guy N. Loucks. This company was disbanded on 23 October 1868
- Volunteer Militia Foot Artillery Company of Iroquois – raised on 8 May 1862, under Captain Alex. Macdonell, with Lieutenant Rufus Carman and Second Lieutenant Samuel I. Boyd. This company was disbanded on 27 March 1874

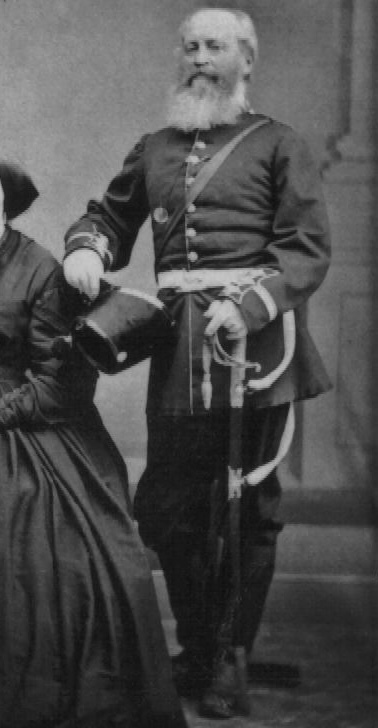
Captain Jacob F. Pringle, Cornwall Infantry Company, c. 1863

- Cornwall Infantry Company – raised on 14 November 1862, under Captain Jacob F. Pringle, with Lieutenant D.B. McLennan and Ensign Hugh R. Macdonell. Formed part of the 59th Battalion in 1868
- Alexandria Infantry Company – raised on 19 November 1862, under Captain Lauchlin McDougald, with Lieutenant William McL. Grant and Ensign D.A. McDonald. This company was disbanded in September 1865
- Morrisburg Infantry Company – raised on 19 November 1862, under Captain Isaac N. Rose, with Lieutenant William D. Mickle and Ensign Samuel Garvey. This company was disbanded in April 1864
- Dixon's Corners Infantry Company – raised on 2 January 1863, under Captain Robert Lowery, with Lieutenant Adam J. Dixon and Ensign Josephus Rose. This company was disbanded in April 1864
- Kenyon Infantry Company – raised on 22 January 1863, under Captain Angus K. Macdonald, with Lieutenant Ronald R. Macdonald and Ensign John A. Macdougald. This company was disbanded in April 1864
- Lancaster Infantry Company – raised on 6 July 1866, under Captain D.B. McLennan, with Lieutenant R. McLennan and Ensign J.J. McNaughton. Formed part of the 59th Battalion in 1868
- Williamstown Infantry Company – raised on 6 July 1866, under Captain George H. McGillivray, with Lieutenant Donald Macmaster. Formed part of the 59th Battalion in 1868
- Aultsville Infantry Company – raised on 20 July 1866, under Captain John J. Adams, with Lieutenant James H. Bredin and Ensign William D. Wilson. This company formed part of the 56th Grenville Battalion
- Dickinson's Landing Infantry Company – raised on 20 July 1866, under Captain William S. Wood, with Lieutenant Oscar Fulton and Ensign C. Archibald. Formed part of the 59th Battalion in 1868
- Dunvegan Infantry Company – raised on 21 August 1868, under Captain Donald McDiarmid, with Lieutenant Duncan J. McCuaig and Ensign John J. McCuaig. Formed part of the 59th Battalion in 1871

In 1866, the various companies in the counties were called out for service along the St. Lawrence River frontier, serving at Prescott and Cornwall. An attack on Prescott and subsequent advance to Ottawa was prevented by the presence of a considerable force of volunteers from Dundas, Stormont, and Glengarry, and a British gunboat on the river. The Fenians then moved eastward to Malone and vicinity, and an attack on Cornwall was expected, but the presence of three thousand troops there again dissuaded them from attacking.

The following local companies served on active duty during the 1866 raid:

- 59th Cornwall Battalion – at Cornwall, would become the 59th Stormont and Glengarry Battalion
- Cornwall Company of Infantry and Rifles – at Cornwall, James Pliny Whitney served with the unit
- Morrisburg Garrison Artillery – at Prescott
- Iroquois Garrison Artillery – at Prescott
- Cornwall Mounted Patrol (Cavalry) – at Cornwall

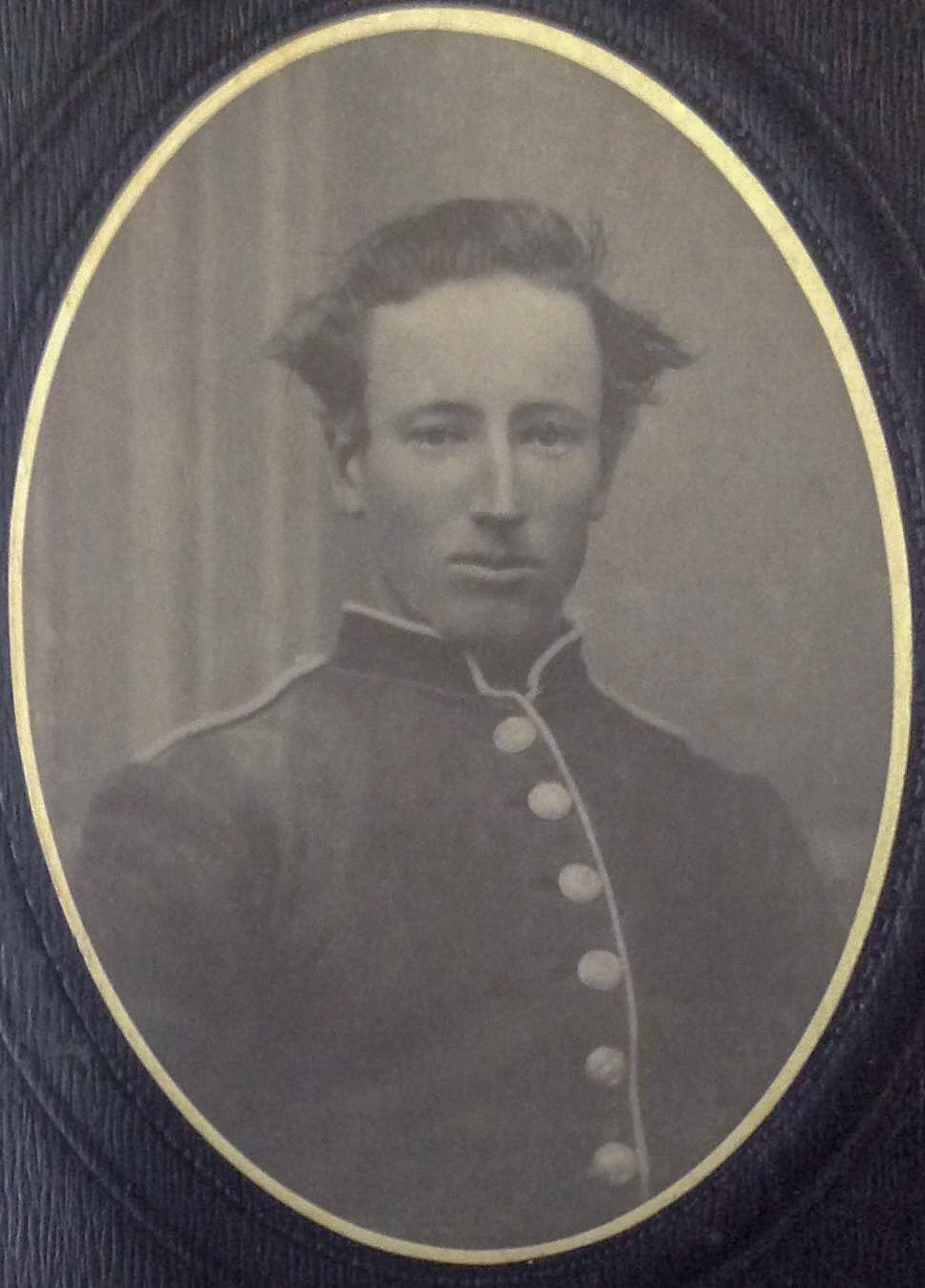
Private Herman Warner of the 59th Stormont and Glengarry Battalion, Fenian Raids 1870

After the 1866 invasion, six of these companies amalgamated in 1868 to form the 59th Stormont and Glengarry Battalion and was again called out on active service on 24 May 1870. It served on the St. Lawrence River frontier at Prescott and Cornwall until it was removed from active service on 1 June 1870. A seventh company was added in the early 1870s, and in 1880, the Vernon Infantry Company, which had been raised in 1866, became No. 8 Company of the 59th Regiment, and its headquarters moved to the village of Finch, but was made independent again later in 1880.

Nine men from the Stormont and Glengarry Regiment served in the Second Boer War.

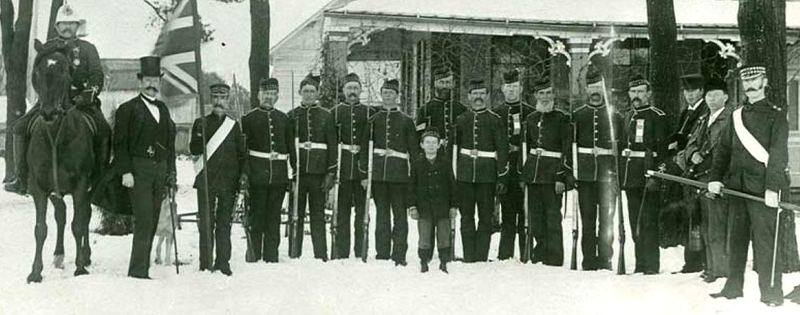
Company of the 59th Stormont and Glengarry Battalion, c. 1880

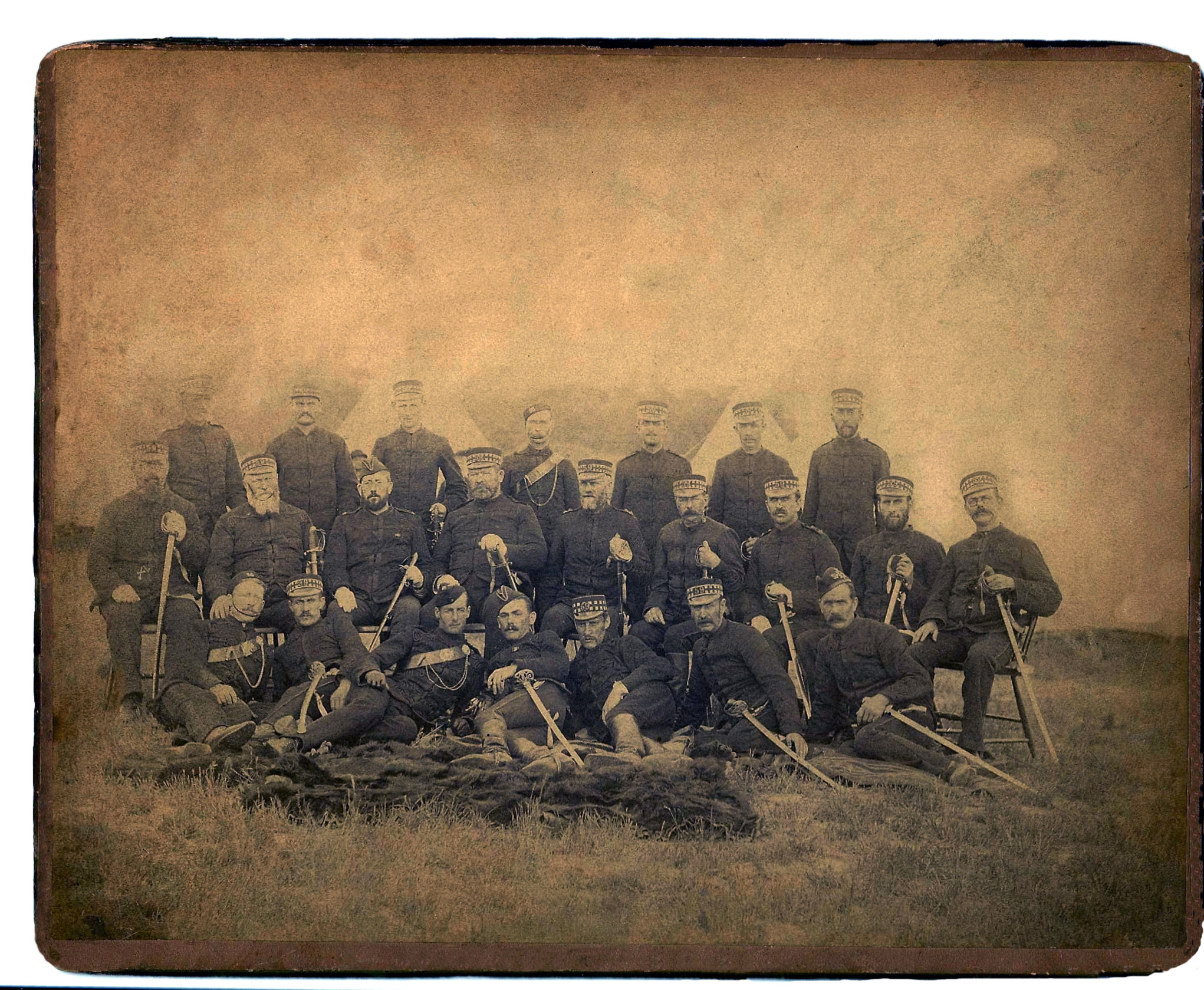
Officers of the 59th Stormont Battalion, c. 1885

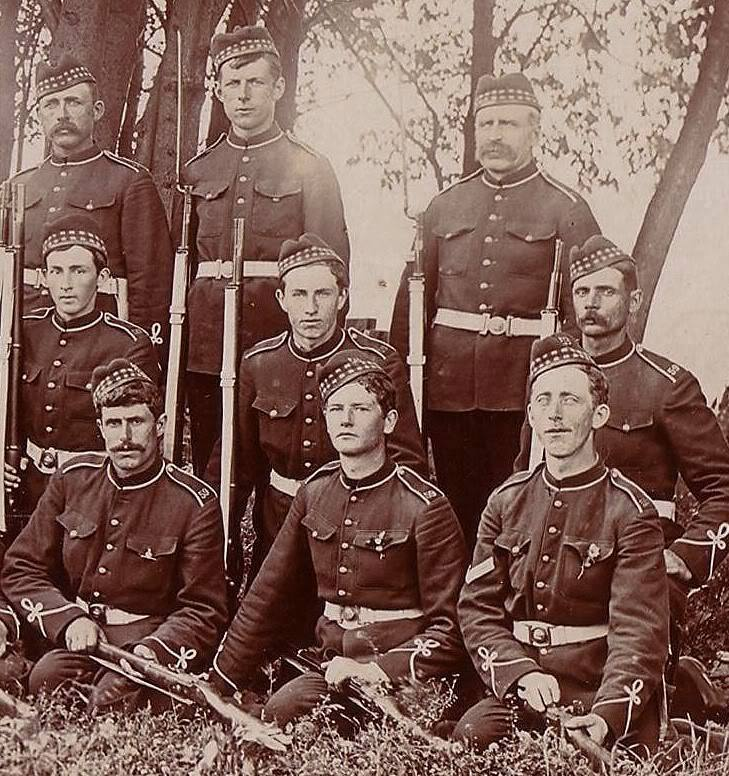
Company of 59th Stormont and Glengarry Highlanders, c. 1890

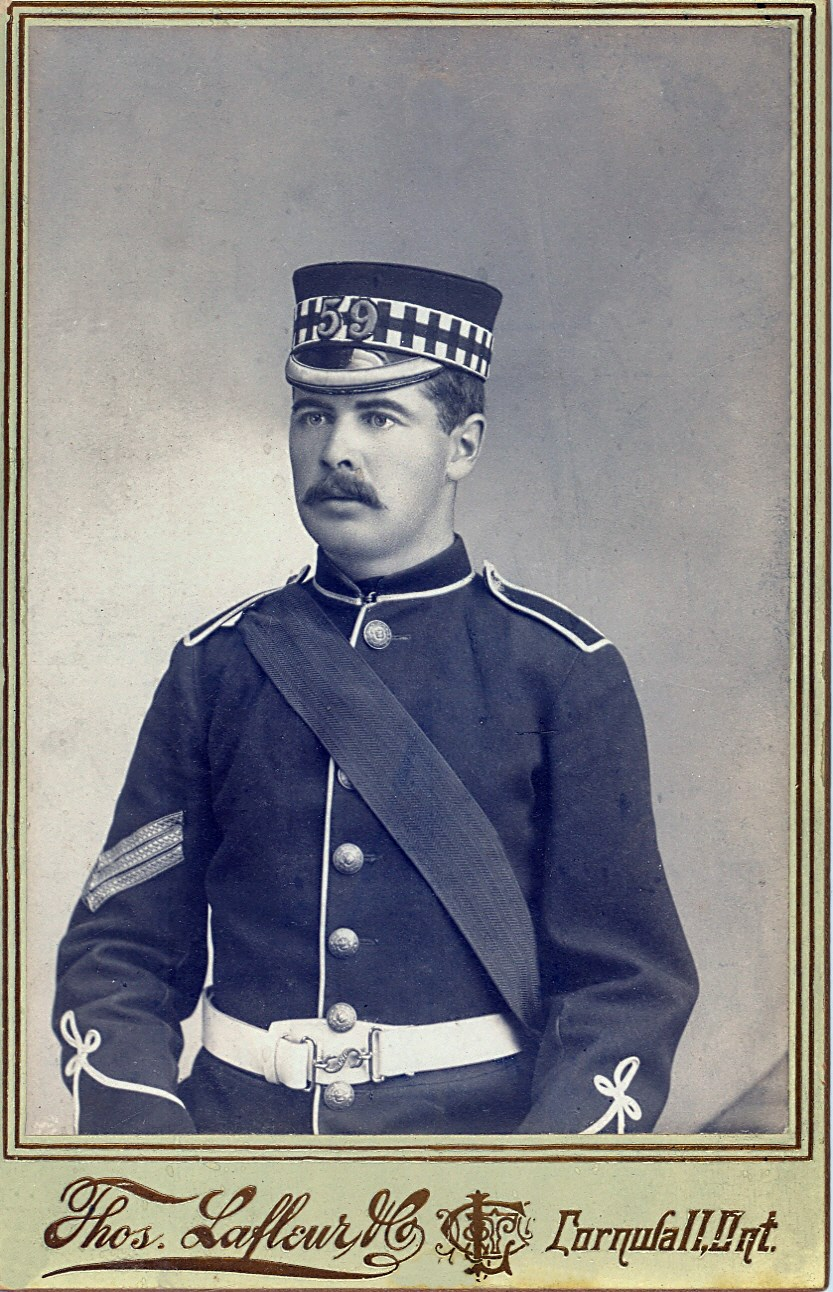
Sergeant of the 59th Stormont and Glengarry Battalion, c. 1895

=== Great War ===
At the outbreak of the Great War, the regiment – in Highland dress since 1904 – guarded the St. Lawrence canals until December 1915, when the United Counties raised the 154th Battalion for the Canadian Expeditionary Force.

The 154th Battalion went overseas but was broken up to reinforce the "Iron Second," the 21st and 38th Battalions and the 4th Canadian Mounted Rifles. Of the 154th Battalion soldiers, 143 were killed and 397 wounded; their efforts are commemorated in 24 decorations and six battle honours.

More than 100 members of the 59th Stormont and Glengarry Regiment were killed while serving with the CEF, including Claude Joseph Patrick Nunney, who won the Victoria Cross in 1918. Nunney joined the 59th in 1913 and was transferred to the 38th Battalion, which is perpetuated by The Cameron Highlanders of Ottawa (Duke of Edinburgh's Own), so the Camerons claim him as well; however, his medals hang today in the Warrant Officers' and Sergeants' Mess of the SD&G Highlanders.

=== Second World War ===
When the Second World War began, the Regiment once again guarded the St. Lawrence canals. Mobilization came in June 1940, and the Regiment absorbed companies from the Princess of Wales' Own Regiment and the Brockville Rifles to form an overseas battalion that went to England in 1941 as part of the 9th Canadian Infantry Brigade, 3rd Canadian Infantry Division.

The SD&G Highlanders landed in Normandy on D Day and was the first regiment to enter Caen, reaching the centre of the city at 1300 hours, July 9, 1944.

Fifty-five days later, 112 SD&G Highlanders had been killed in action and 312 more wounded in the Falaise Gap. The Regiment fought across France via Rouen, Eu, Le Hamel and Boulogne, moved into the Netherlands and took part in the amphibious landing across the Savojaardsplaat, and advanced to Knokke by way of Breskens. It moved next to Nijmegen to relieve the airborne troops, and helped guard the bridge while the Rhine crossing was prepared. The Regiment then fought through the Hochwald and north to cross the Ems-River and take the city of Leer.

At dawn on May 3, 1945, German marine-units launched an attack on two forward companies of the SD&G Highlanders, occupying the village of Rorichum, near Oldersum, that was the final action during the war, Victory in Europe Day (VE Day) found the SD&G Highlanders near Emden.

It was said of the Regiment that it "never failed to take an objective; never lost a yard of ground; never lost a man taken prisoner in offensive action."

Altogether 3,342 officers and men served overseas with the SD&G Highlanders, of whom 278 were killed and 781 wounded; 74 decorations and 25 battle honours were awarded. A total of 3,418 officers and men served in the 2nd Battalion (Reserve); of them, 1,882 went on active service and 27 were killed. A third battalion raised in July 1945 served in the occupation of Germany and was disbanded in May 1946.

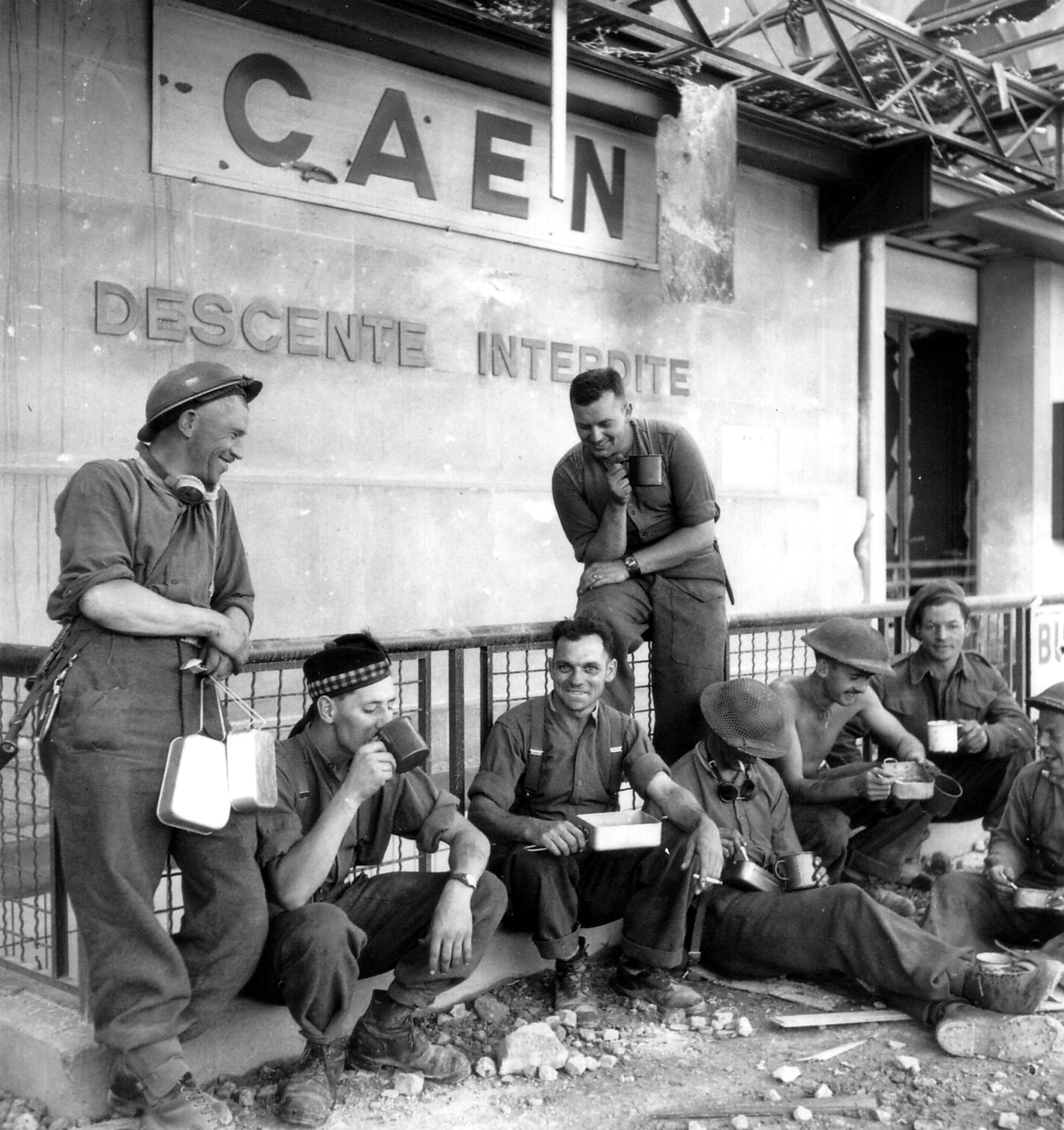
Stormont, Dundas and Glengarry Highlanders resting at Caen station, July 1944.

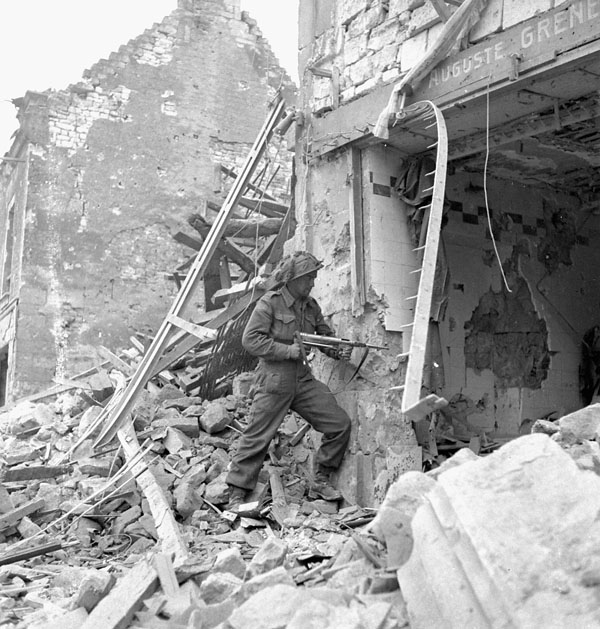
Infantryman of the Stormont, Dundas and Glengarry Highlanders armed with a German Schmeisser MP 40

=== Post war ===
In 1968, to mark the regiment's centenary, the Stormont, Dundas and Glengarry Highlanders received the Freedom of the City of Cornwall.

=== Conflict in Afghanistan ===
The regiment contributed an aggregate of more than 20% of its authorized strength to the various Task Forces which served in Afghanistan between 2002 and 2014. Corporal Eric Monnin was awarded the Medal of Military Valour for his actions on 9 July 2010 in Kandahar, Afghanistan, while serving with the 1st Battalion, the Royal Canadian Regiment.

Sergeant Marc Daniel Leger from Lancaster served as a soldier in the Highlanders from March 1991 to February 1993, when he transferred to Princess Patricia's Canadian Light Infantry (PPCLI).

== Organization ==
=== 59th Stormont and Glengarry Battalion of Infantry (3 July 1868) ===
Maj. Darby Bergin as the first Commanding Officer,

- No. 1 Company (Cornwall) (first raised on 22 January 1862, as the 1st Volunteer Militia Rifle Company of Cornwall) – Capt. Daniel McCourt
- No. 2 Company (Cornwall) (first raised on 31 January 1862, as the 2nd Volunteer Militia Rifle Company of Cornwall) – Capt. D.A. Macdonald
- No. 3 Company (Cornwall) (first raised on 14 November 1862, as the Cornwall Infantry Company ) – Capt. Alex. F. McIntyre
- No. 4 Company (Lancaster) (first raised on 6 July 1866, as the Lancaster Infantry Company) – Capt. Alex. B. McLennan
- No. 5 Company (Williamstown) (first raised on 6 July 1866, as the Williamstown Infantry Company) – Capt. George H. McGillivray
- No. 6 Company (Dickinson's Landing) (first raised on 20 July 1866, as the Dickinson's Landing Infantry Company) – Capt. William S. Wood
- No. 7 Company (Dunvegan) (first formed on 21 August 1868, as the Dunvegan Infantry Company) – Capt. Donald McDiarmid

=== The Stormont, Dundas and Glengarry Highlanders (15 February 1922) ===
- 1st Battalion (perpetuating the 154th Battalion, CEF)
- 2nd (Reserve) Battalion

== Commanding officers ==
Commanding and honorary officers
Name	Years of command	Photo
Surgeon-General Darby Bergin	1868 (first) – 1885	
Lieutenant Colonel James Henry Bredin	1885–1897	
Lieutenant Colonel Roderick R. McLennan	1897–1900	
Lieutenant Colonel Gordon Baker VD	1900–1903	
Colonel Hiram A. Morgan	1903–1908	
Lieutenant Colonel Robert Smith	1908–1910	
Lieutenant Colonel Alexander G.F. Macdonald	1910–1920; Honorary Lieutenant-Colonel 1925–1942; Honorary Colonel 1942–1948	
Lieutenant General Archibald C. MacDonell	Honorary Colonel 1921–1940	
Colonel William H. Magwood	1920–1924	
Colonel John A. Gillies VD	1924–1929	
Lieutenant Colonel Frederick G. Robinson MC, VD	1929–1932	
Lieutenant Colonel William J. Franklin	1932–1934; C.O. 1st Battalion 1940; C.O. 2nd Battalion 1940–1945; Honorary Lieutenant-Colonel 1956–1961; Honorary Colonel 1961–1974	
Lieutenant Colonel Gordon N. Phillips ED	1934–1938	
Lieutenant Colonel George D. Gillie MC, ED	1938–1940	
Colonel Richard T.E. Hicks-Lyne MC, ED	C.O. 1st Battalion 1940–1942	
Lieutenant Colonel W. S. Rutherford ED	C.O. 1st Battalion January 1942 – August 1942	
Brigadier Michael S. Dunn OBE, CD	C.O. 1st Battalion September 1942 – December 1942	
Lieutenant Colonel G.H. Christiansen	C.O. 1st Battalion December 1942 – August 1944	
Colonel R. Rowley DSO, ED	C.O. 1st Battalion August 1944 – March 1945	
Lieutenant Colonel N.M. Gemmell DSO	C.O. 1st Battalion March 1945 – May 1945	
Colonel Donald C. Cameron	C.O. 3rd Battalion 1945–1946	
Lieutenant Colonel Donald R. Dick	1945–1949	
Lieutenant Colonel Arthur M. Irvine MBE, CD	1949–1952	
General H.D.G. Crerar CH, CB, DSO, CD	Honorary Colonel 1951–1956	
Lieutenant Colonel J.P. Donihee CD	1952–1957	
Lionel Chevrier PC, CC, QC	Honorary Lieutenant Colonel 1948–1956; Honorary Colonel 1956–1961	
Colonel Frederick M. Cass CD, QC	Honorary Lieutenant Colonel 1961–1974; Honorary Colonel 1974–1983	
Lucien Lamoureux QC	Honorary Lieutenant Colonel 1974–1980	
Lieutenant Colonel D.C. Stewart MC, CD	1957–1962; Honorary Lieutenant Colonel 1983–1986; Honorary Colonel 1986–1989	
Lieutenant Colonel George E. Edgerton ED, CD	1962–1964; Honorary Lieutenant Colonel 1980–1983; Honorary Colonel 1983–1986	
Lieutenant Colonel John Mullineux CD	1964–1967	
Lieutenant Colonel Donald R. Fitzpatrick CD	1967–1970; Honorary Lieutenant Colonel 1986–1989; Honorary Colonel 1989–1993	
Brigadier General William J. Patterson OMM, CD	1970–1974; Honorary Lieutenant Colonel 1989–1993; Honorary Colonel 1993–present	
Lieutenant Colonel Thomas J. O'Brien CD	1974–1977; Honorary Lieutenant Colonel 1993–present	
Lieutenant Colonel William J. Shearing	1977–1980	
Lieutenant Colonel J.R.W. McLauchlan CD	1980–1982	
Lieutenant Colonel William L. Masson CD	1982–1985	
Lieutenant Colonel James F.C. Sheflin CD	1985–1987	
Lieutenant Colonel J. Keith Simpson CD	1987–1990	
Lieutenant Colonel Robert J. Brooks CD	1990–1994	
Lieutenant Colonel Brent L. Lafave CD	1994–1998	
Lieutenant Colonel A.F. Robertson CD	1998–2000	
Lieutenant Colonel S.L.D. Julien CD	2000–2003	
Lieutenant Colonel A.J.G Rochette CD	2003–2007	
Lieutenant Colonel W.R. Clarke CD	2007–2010	
Lieutenant Colonel R.C. Duda CD	2010–2013	
Lieutenant Colonel S.J. Young CD	2013–2016	
Lieutenant Colonel C.E. French CD	2016–2019	
Lieutenant Colonel R. Hartman CD	2019–2023	
Lieutenant Colonel H.G. Scharf CD	2023–2024	
Lieutenant Colonel R.P. Hendy CD	2024–Present	

== Battle honours ==
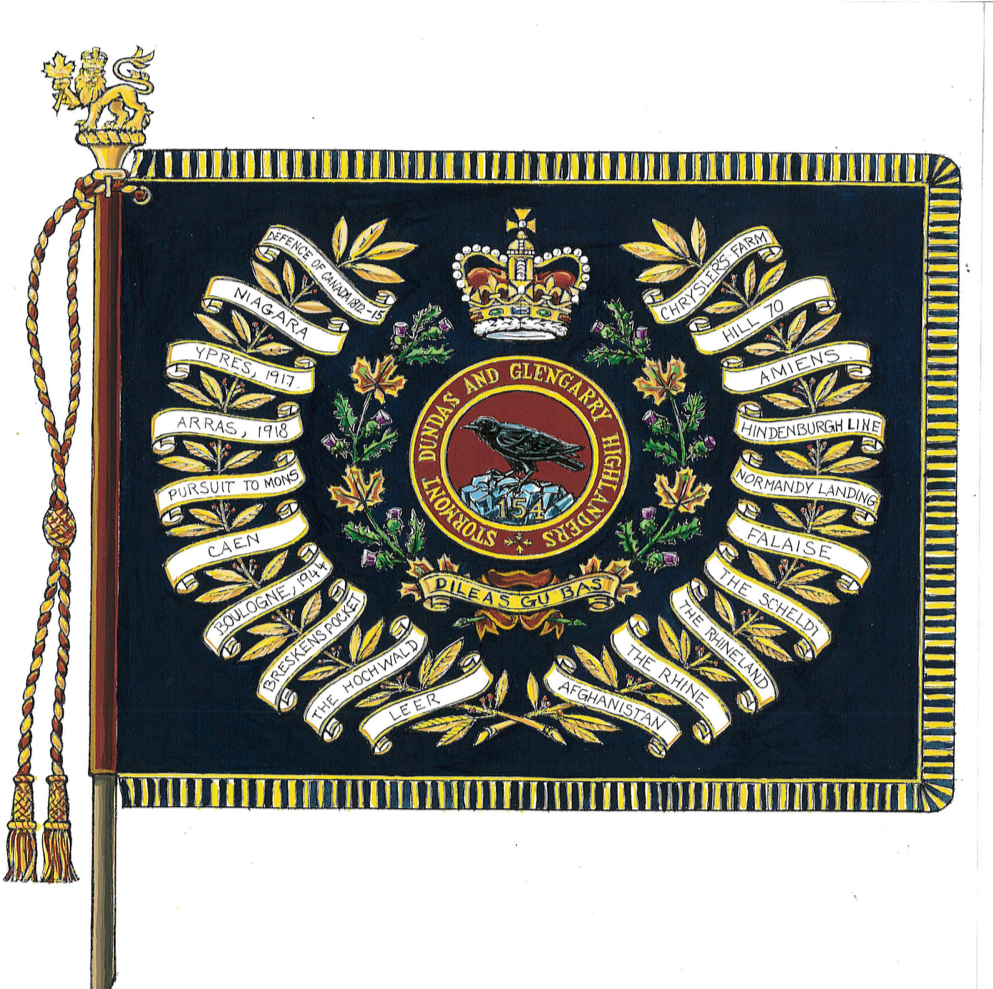
Regimental colour, with additional battle honours (2019)

In the list below, battle honours in capitals were awarded for participation in large operations and campaigns, while those in lowercase indicate honours granted for more specific battles. Those battle honours in italics are emblazoned on the regimental colour.

=== War of 1812 ===
- Defence of Canada – 1812–1815 – Défense du Canada
- Crysler's Farm
- Niagara (awarded in commemoration of the Glengarry Light Infantry Fencibles)
- The non-emblazonable honorary distinction Defence of Canada – 1812–1815 – Défense du Canada

=== Great War ===
- Hill 70
- Ypres, 1917
- Amiens
- Arras, 1918
- Hindenburg Line
- Pursuit to Mons

=== Second World War ===
- Normandy Landing
- Caen
- The Orne (Buron)
- Bourguébus Ridge
- Faubourg de Vaucelles
- Falaise
- The Laison
- Chambois
- Boulogne, 1944
- The Scheldt
- Savojaards Plaat
- Breskens Pocket
- The Rhineland
- Waal Flats
- The Hochwald
- The Rhine
- Zutphen
- Leer
- North West Europe, 1944–1945

=== Conflict in Afghanistan ===
- Afghanistan

== Regimental headquarters ==
Cornwall Armoury; 505 Fourth Street East, Cornwall, Ontario K6H 2J7

Coordinates: 45°1′29″N 74°43′8″W

== Armoury ==
Site	Date(s)	Designated	Location	Description	Image
The Stormont, Dundas and Glengarry Highlanders|Cornwall Armoury 505 Fourth Street East,	1938–9	1996 Recognized – Register of the Government of Canada Heritage Buildings	Cornwall, Ontario	Housing The Stormont, Dundas and Glengarry Highlanders, this centrally located building with a low-pitched gable roof was constructed of buff-coloured brick with stone trim.	

== Regimental museum ==
The museum collects, preserves and exhibits military artifacts and archival material related to the Regiment and its predecessor units in the three counties of Stormont, Dundas and Glengarry as well as material related to the military experiences of the residents of the three counties.

=== Tartan ===
Macdonell of Glengarry

=== Monuments, plaques, badges, honour rolls ===
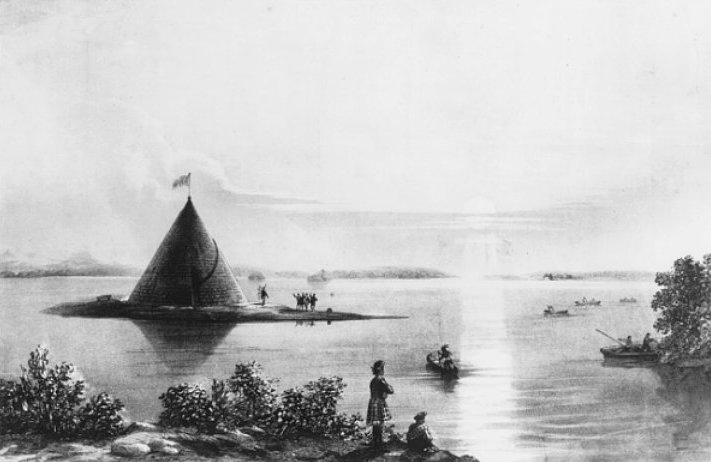
Stormont, Dundas and Glengarry Highlanders Cairn 1843

- Glengarry Fencibles
  - Provincial Plaque at Cornwall Armoury
- 154th Battalion
  - Plaque and Honour Roll at Cornwall Armoury
  - Monument in Alexandria, Glengarry County
- 1st Battalion
  - Plaque and Honour Roll at Cornwall Armoury
  - Honour Roll at Brockville Armoury
  - Plaque and Honour Roll at Royal Canadian Legion Number 9, Kingston
  - Badge at Memorial Centre, Peterborough
  - Badge on D-Day tank "Bold" at Courseulles, France
  - Plaque and Badge on Chateau de Paix de Coeur and
  - Monument at "Rue des Glengarrians", Les Buissons, France
  - Memorial Tablet at Abbaye d’Ardenne
  - Monument, Badge and Plaque at Avenue President, Coty and Rue d’Authie, Caen, France
  - Mannequin at Bayeux Memorial Museum of The Battle of Normandy, France
  - Monument at "Place du Glens" at Urville, France
  - Plaque at Le Mairie
  - Plaque in the Hotel de Ville, Rouen, France
  - Plaque and Badge in the Citadel, Boulonge, France
  - Badge on Belgian Resistance Monument, Knokke/Heist, Belgium
  - Plaque at Town Hall, Breskens, Netherlands
  - Plaque at Town Hall, Hoofdplaat, Netherlands

The 59th Battalion Colours are laid up in the Officers' Mess and the 154th Battalion Colours are laid up in the Trinity Anglican Church, Second Street, Cornwall, Ontario.

== Media ==
- Up the Glens: Stormont, Dundas and Glengarry Highlanders, 1783–1994 by W; Patterson, W J Boss (1995)
- The Stormont, Dundas and Glengarry Highlanders 1783–1951 by Lieut.-Colonel W., C.D. Boss (1952)

== See also ==
- Canadian-Scottish regiment
- List of armouries in Canada
- Military history of Canada
- History of the Canadian Army
- Canadian Armed Forces
- Paul Yakabuski

== Order of precedence ==
Preceded by Brockville Rifles	The Stormont, Dundas and Glengarry Highlanders	Succeeded by Les Fusiliers du S^{t}-Laurent
