= Neil McLean (judge) =

Neil McLean (1759 – September 3, 1832) was a Scottish-born judge, politician and military officer in Upper Canada. He served as sheriff in the Eastern District and was appointed to the Legislative Council of Upper Canada.

== Biography ==
McLean was born in Scotland in 1759, descended from the Chiefs of Mingarry Castle on the Isle of Mull, and came to North America as a young man and ensign with the 84th Regiment of Foot (Royal Highland Emigrants) to fight in the American Revolution. After the war he was granted 2,000 acres (8 km^{2}) and settled near Cornwall in Upper Canada. As a leading Presbyterian and a Highland gentleman and officer, McLean was a prominent figure in the local community.

He served as sheriff in the Eastern District and, in 1788, was named judge in the surrogate court. He served in the Stormont militia during the War of 1812, becoming colonel and commanding at the Battle of Hoople's Creek and the Occupation of Cornwall. In 1815, he was appointed to the Legislative Council of Upper Canada but he never attended. He helped found the Highland Society of Canada in 1818. He died in St. Andrews in 1832.

== Family ==
McLean married Isabella, daughter of John MacDonald of Leek, cadets of the Clan MacDonald of Glengarry, being a descendant of the 7th Chief of Glengarry who died in 1645. MacDonald, who was wounded at the Battle of Culloden (1746), was one of the three brothers who helped form the Glengarry Fencibles under their Chief, Colonel Alexander Ranaldson MacDonald of Glengarry. Neil and Isabella's sons Archibald and Alexander were both members of the Legislative Assembly for the province and Archibald later became its chief justice.
