= Battle of Hoople's Creek =

Coordinates: 45.0169°N 75.0107°W

- Part of War of 1812
Date	November 10, 1813
Location	Hoople's Creek, Stormont County, Upper Canada
Result	American victory

Belligerents
United Kingdom; Upper Canada	United States

Commanders and leaders
Maj. Dennis; Col. Neil McLean; Capt. Donald Macdonell	Gen. Jacob Brown; Maj. Benjamin Forsyth; Gen. Winfield Scott

Units involved
1st Regiment of Stormont Militia; 2nd Regiment of Glengarry Militia; Mohawk Warriors	1st U.S. Rifles

Strength
500	300+

Casualties and losses
1 wounded	Several wounded

The Battle of Hoople's Creek, (also known as Hoople Creek), was a skirmish fought on November 10, 1813, as a precursor to the Battle of Crysler's Farm.

The Stormont and Glengarry Militias fought the 1st U.S. Rifles along the banks of Hoople's Creek in Stormont County, delaying the American advance to Cornwall and allowing for the evacuation important military supplies from the town. The delay also gave Gen. Morrison precious time to consolidate his forces around Crysler's farm for the decisive battle.

Mary Hoople lived on the farm by the creek where the battle was fought and tried unsuccessfully to save the life of an invading American rifleman wounded at the battle on November 10, 1813. After the War, the U.S. government compensated her for compassion.
