= Alexander Fraser (Upper Canada politician) =

Canadian politician

Alexander Fraser MLA
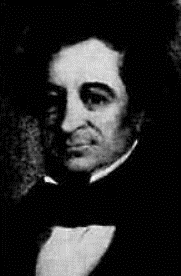

Justice of the Peace for the Eastern District
- In office 1820–1828

Member of Parliament for Glengarry
- In office 1828–1834
- Preceded by: Alexander Macdonell
- Succeeded by: Donald Macdonell

Legislative Councilor for Canada West
- In office 1841–1853

Warden of the Eastern District
- In office 1841–1849

Personal details
- Born: 18 January 1786 Fort Augustus, Scotland
- Died: 12 November 1853 (aged 67) Fraserfield, Williamstown, Glengarry County
- Spouse: Ann Macdonell
- Relations: Jacob Farrand Pringle (son-in-law); Donald Alexander Macdonald (son-in-law); Alexander G.F. Macdonald (grandson); Robert Abercrombie Pringle (grandson)
- Profession: Politician, soldier, judge

Military service
- Allegiance: British Army; Canadian Militia
- Years of service: 1803 - 1850
- Rank: Quartermaster; Captain; Colonel
- Unit: Canadian Regiment of Fencible Infantry (1803-15); Glengarry Militia (1816-36)
- Commands: 1st Glengarry Regiment of Militia (1837-50)
- Battles/wars: War of 1812: St. Lawrence Campaign; Rebellions of 1837–1838: Battle of Beauharnois

Alexander Fraser (January 18, 1786 – November 12, 1853) was a soldier and political figure in Upper Canada.

He was born in Glendoemore, near Fort Augustus, Scotland in 1786. He joined the Canadian Fencibles in Scotland in 1803 and came to Quebec with them in 1805. He served as Quartermaster with them during the War of 1812. In 1816, he settled in Charlottenburgh Township in Glengarry County. He called his farm, located near Williamstown, Fraserfield. He was a co-founder of the Highland Society of Canada in 1818. In 1820, he was appointed justice of the peace in the Eastern District. In 1828, he was elected to the 10th Parliament of Upper Canada representing Glengarry County. In 1836, he became registrar for the county.

He commanded the 1st Glengarry Battalion of Militia during the rebellion of 1837–38 in Lower Canada fighting at the Battle of Beauharnois. In 1839, he became a member of the Legislative Council. In 1841, he became a legislative councilor for the province of Canada and he was appointed the first warden of the Eastern District. He opposed the Rebellion Losses Bill of 1849 and lobbied to ensure that the old Eastern District remained intact in 1849 as the United Counties of Stormont, Dundas and Glengarry.

Fraser married Ann Macdonell (1797-1861), daughter of Archibald Macdonell of Leek (c.1741-1816) who fought with the King's Royal Regiment of New York during the American Revolution and served as the first Colonel of the Stormont Militia in 1792. His daughter Catherine (1821-1865) married Donald Alexander Macdonald and his daughter Isabella (1825-1910) married Jacob Farrand Pringle.

He died at Fraserfield in 1853.
