= Donald Alexander Macdonald =

Canadian politician

The Honourable Donald Alexander Macdonald PC
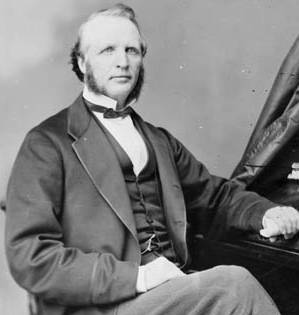

4th Lieutenant Governor of Ontario
- In office May 18, 1875 – June 30, 1880
- Monarch: Victoria
- Governors General: The Earl of Dufferin; Marquess of Lorne
- Premier: Oliver Mowat
- Preceded by: John Willoughby Crawford
- Succeeded by: John Beverley Robinson

Member of the Canadian Parliament for Glengarry
- In office September 20, 1867 – May 18, 1875
- Preceded by: Riding established
- Succeeded by: Archibald McNab

Personal details
- Born: February 17, 1817 St. Raphael, Upper Canada
- Died: June 10, 1896 (aged 79) Montreal, Quebec, Canada
- Party: Liberal
- Relations: Alexander Francis Macdonald, brother John Sandfield Macdonald, brother

Military service
- Allegiance: Upper Canada
- Branch/service: Canadian militia
- Years of service: 1840s-1860s
- Rank: Major; Colonel
- Unit: Glengarry Militia
- Commands: 4th Battalion, Glengarry Militia

Donald Alexander Macdonald PC (February 17, 1817 – June 10, 1896) was a Canadian politician.

Born in 1817 in St. Raphael's, Upper Canada, Donald Alexander Macdonald studied at St Raphael's College under the first Catholic Bishop of Ontario, Alexander Macdonell. He became a railway contractor and was elected as a member of the Legislative Assembly of the Province of Canada from 1857 to 1867. He was the Liberal Member of Parliament for Glengarry in the House of Commons of Canada from 1867 to 1875, and served as Postmaster General of Canada. In 1875 Macdonald was appointed the fourth Lieutenant Governor of Ontario and held that post until 1880. He died in Montreal in 1896.

Macdonald served as a Major in the 4th Battalion, Glengarry Militia, succeeding his brother John as Commanding Officer in 1852.

He was the brother of John Sandfield Macdonald, the first Premier of Ontario, and Alexander Francis Macdonald, the MP for Cornwall from 1874 to 1878.

== Family ==
Hon. Donald Alexander Macdonald, P.C., and Lieutenant-Governor of Ontario, 1875–80, married Catherine Fraser, daughter of Colonel the Hon. Alexander Fraser, M.L.C. of Fraserfield and commanding officer of the 1st Glengarry Militia.

The couple`s daughter Margaret was born at Alexandria, Ont., and educated in Montreal. She married, at Toronto, Ontario September 16, 1875, William Hales Hingston, M.D., F.R.C.S. (Lond.), who, was appointed a Commander of the Roman Order of St. Gregory (1875), was knighted by Queen Victoria in 1895, and was called to the Senate of Canada in 1896.

His son Col. Alexander George Fraser Macdonald (1863–1948) was an officer in the Canadian Militia, serving in the 59th Stormont and Glengarry Battalion from 1897 to 1914. He commanded the 154th (Stormont-Dundas-Glengarry) Battalion, CEF during the First World War.

Government offices
Preceded by John Willoughby Crawford	Lieutenant Governor of Ontario; 1875–1880	Succeeded by John Beverley Robinson
