= Cornwall (federal electoral district) =

Former federal electoral district in Ontario, Canada

Cornwall was a federal electoral district represented in the House of Commons of Canada from 1867 to 1882. It was located in the province of Ontario. It was created by the British North America Act 1867. It consisted of the Town of Cornwall and the Township of Cornwall.

The electoral district was abolished in 1882 when it was merged into Cornwall and Stormont riding.

== Members of Parliament ==
This riding elected the following members of Parliament:

Parliament	Years	Member	Party
1st	1867–1872	John Sandfield Macdonald	Liberal
2nd	1872–1874	Darby Bergin	Liberal–Conservative
3rd	1874–1874	Alexander Francis Macdonald	Liberal
3rd	1874–1878	Alexander Francis Macdonald	Liberal
4th	1878–1880	Darby Bergin	Liberal–Conservative
4th	1880–1882	Darby Bergin	Liberal–Conservative
Riding dissolved into Cornwall and Stormont

== Election results ==
1867 Canadian federal election
Party	Candidate	Votes
Liberal	John Sandfield Macdonald	451
Unknown	? Mattice	295
Source: Canadian Elections Database

Result by subdivision

Subdivision	Macdonald	Mattice	Total vote	Eligible voters
Cornwall (town) East Ward	16	37	53	78
Cornwall (town) Centre Ward	49	59	108	159
Cornwall (town) West Ward	27	18	45	78
Cornwall Township	359	181	540	712
Total	451	295	746	1,027

1872 Canadian federal election
Party	Candidate	Votes
Liberal–Conservative	Darby Bergin	acclaimed
Source: Canadian Elections Database

1874 Canadian federal election
Party	Candidate	Votes
Liberal	Alexander Francis Macdonald	471
Liberal–Conservative	Darby Bergin	448
Source: Canadian Elections Database

On Mr. Macdonald being unseated on petition, 7 September 1874:

By-election on 20 October 1874
Party	Candidate	Votes
Liberal	MACDONALD, Alexander Francis	471
Liberal–Conservative	BERGIN, Darby	448

1878 Canadian federal election
Party	Candidate	Votes
Liberal–Conservative	Darby Bergin	575
Liberal	Donald McLennan	537
Source: Canadian Elections Database

On Mr. Bergin being unseated on petition, 24 December 1879:

By-election on 27 January 1880
Party	Candidate	Votes
Liberal–Conservative	BERGIN, Darby	624
Liberal	MCLENNNAN, D.B.	447

== See also ==
- List of Canadian electoral districts
- Historical federal electoral districts of Canada
