= Alexander Francis Macdonald =

Canadian politician

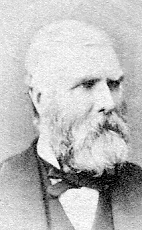

Member of the Canadian Parliament for Cornwall
- In office 1874–1878
- Preceded by: Darby Bergin
- Succeeded by: Darby Bergin

Personal details
- Born: 1818 St. Raphael's, Upper Canada
- Died: April 12, 1913 (aged 94–95) Cornwall, Ontario, Canada
- Party: Liberal
- Occupation: railway contractor

Alexander Francis Macdonald (1818 – April 12, 1913) was a politician and railway contractor.

The son of Alexander Macdonald, he was educated in Cornwall and at St Raphael's College. He settled in Cornwall. Macdonald was president of the Canada Cotton Company. After being elected in the 1874 election on January 22, he was unseated by petition on September 7, 1874, and re-elected on October 20 the same year. Macdonald did not run in the 1878 election. His brothers, John Sandfield Macdonald and Donald Alexander Macdonald, were also Members of Parliament.

Macdonald never married. He died in Cornwall at the age of 95.

== Electoral record ==
1872 Canadian federal election: Cornwall
Party	Candidate	Votes
Liberal–Conservative	Darby Bergin	acclaimed
Source: Canadian Elections Database

On Mr. Macdonald being unseated on petition, 7 September 1874:

By-election on 20 October 1874
Party	Candidate	Votes
Liberal	MACDONALD, Alexander Francis	471
Liberal–Conservative	BERGIN, Darby	448
