= 156th (Leeds and Grenville) Battalion, CEF =

The 156th (Leeds and Grenville) Battalion, CEF was a unit in the Canadian Expeditionary Force during the First World War.

Based in Brockville, Ontario, the unit began recruiting in late 1915 in Leeds and Grenville Counties. After sailing to England in October 1916, the battalion was absorbed into the 2nd, 21st, and 38th Battalions, CEF. A draft was also supplied to Princess Patricia's Canadian Light Infantry, with the remaining men going to the 6th Reserve Battalion. The unit officially ceased to exist on February 15, 1918.

The 156th (Leeds and Grenville) Battalion, CEF had two Officers Commanding: Lieut-Col. T. C. D. Bedell (October 17, 1916 – March 14, 1917) and Lieut-Col. C. M. R. Graham (March 14, 1917 – February 27, 1918).

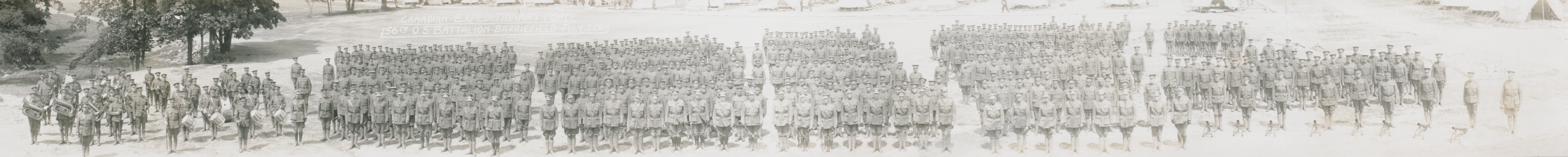
156th O.S. Battalion, Barriefield, July 7, 1916 (HS85-10-32558)
