= History of Prescott, Ontario =

Prescott, Ontario, has been strongly influenced by its geographic position along the Saint Lawrence River. The point at the narrowing of the river led to the persistent use of the area for military fortifications intended to give a degree of control over the river, as well as playing a significant part in regional conflicts of the 18th and early 19th centuries.

The historical navigational challenges downriver from Prescott gave it an uncommon role in Great Lakes shipping and the Saint Lawrence River trade, contributing to the development of its freight forwarding industry, which began in the early 19th century.

Prescott's history continued to be dominated by the transportation industry well into the 20th century, but it also saw the development of a significant brewing and distilling industry which began in the late 19th century.

== French period ==
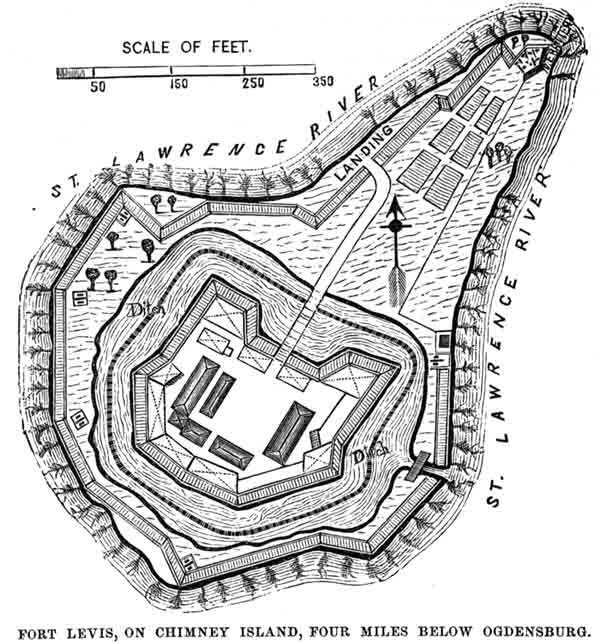
1760 French map depicting Fort de Levis near Prescott, Ontario

Before the arrival of Europeans to the Grenville County area, it was inhabited by the St. Lawrence Iroquois. The French began occupation of the area in the late 17th century, starting with a supply depot and fortified outpost named La Galette en route to Fort Frontenac (Kingston), which was built in the 1670s. Some sources place La Galette at Prescott, while others place it at nearby Johnstown. Fort de La Présentation was later built in 1749 on the other side of the river, at Lighthouse Point near present-day Ogdensburg, New York. This was soon abandoned in favour of Fort Lévis, which was located on Isle Royale (Chimney Island) in the centre of the river.

=== Battle of the Thousand Islands ===
The area became a battleground during the 1754−1763 French and Indian War between Britain and France, as both parties wanted to control what was a strategic stretch of the Saint Lawrence River. This led to the 1760 Battle of the Thousand Islands, when a 10,000-strong British–Iroquois force besieged the French at Fort Lévis. Despite a spirited defense by the 300-strong French garrison, the British took the fort after an extensive artillery bombardment. Afterward, the British occupied the fort, renaming it Fort William Augustus, though they soon abandoned it in favour of the older Fort de La Présentation, which they renamed Fort Oswegatchie. The ruins of Fort Lévis, and the island the fort stood on, were later submerged during the creation of the Saint Lawrence Seaway.

== Arrival of the Loyalists ==
In and around 1775 during the Revolutionary War, America was politically divided. Many Americans were dissatisfied with British rule and sought their independence. Those who sided with the British or who remained neutral were considered to be rebels or traitors known as Loyalists, and this opposition was met with violence. As tensions escalated, the Loyalists were forced from their homes, fleeing north to what would become Upper Canada. The Loyalists were in a terrible position, as they had fled their homes with few to no possessions, and were unable to return to their homes as the Americans had threatened the lives of many Loyalists attempting to return or collect any belongings. The British attempted to negotiate and failed. Eventually, the British needed to do something to accommodate the misplaced soldiers and their families; in 1783, the land was surveyed along the St. Lawrence River surrounding present-day Prescott to be divided amongst the Loyalists as land grants for their loyalty the Crown.

Edward Jessup, born in Stamford, Connecticut in 1735, forfeited 200,000 hectares (500,000 acres) of property near Albany, New York by taking up arms for the King during the Revolutionary War. During the war, he founded the Jessup's Loyal Rangers who served the British. It is this group of soldiers who first settled Prescott and the surrounding townships after disbanding at the end of the war around 1783. For his loyalty and service, Jessup was awarded extensive lands from the Crown. In 1810, Jessup surveyed a townsite on top of his land, the current location of Prescott, which he named after Robert Prescott, Governor-in-Chief of Canada from 1797 to 1807. The townsite was 2.6 square kilometres (1 mi^{2}) in size. Jessup is credited as the town's founder.

The first documented appearance of steam navigation in the Great Lakes area was at Prescott in 1809, when the steamship Dalhousie was launched for service on the St. Lawrence River.

In 1810, Edward Jessup and his son laid out a townsite within Augusta Township near Johnstown, which they named Prescott in honour of General Robert Prescott, who had been governor-in-chief in The Canadas. Prescott had also participated in British campaigns in the area during the French and Indian War, being the aide-de-camp tasked with delivering the news of the fall of Fort Lévis fifty years earlier. Jessup began to take the first steps toward building a concentrated settlement by constructing a log schoolhouse along with a teacher's residence, which was built from stone.

== Fort Wellington ==
=== War of 1812 ===
Following the peace secured by the Jay Treaty, civilian settlers had begun to occupy both sides of the Saint Lawrence in large numbers. Sixteen years after its founding, Ogdensburg had a population of over 1200. There were numerous ties "of blood and trade" on both sides of the border, especially since, for merchants in northern New York, Montreal was the nearest centre of trade. Nathan Ford, the land agent for Samuel Ogden who had overseen much of the settlement of the land around Ogdensburg, was a Federalist who opposed war with Britain. Primary sources from the period discuss cross-border trade, notwithstanding the 1807 United States embargo on Britain and even the start of the War of 1812 itself. Nevertheless, the narrow stretch of the Saint Lawrence between Prescott and Ogdensburg was a strategic corridor which became a regional focal point for military activity.

==== Military buildup and naval engagements ====
In the lead-up to the outbreak of the war, eighty American militiamen were sent to Ogdensburg. War was officially declared in June 1812 and by October, there were over 800 militiamen and United States Army regulars stationed in Ogdensburg along with General Jacob Brown. Brown ordered the reconstruction of "Fort Presentation", which would ultimately never be completed.

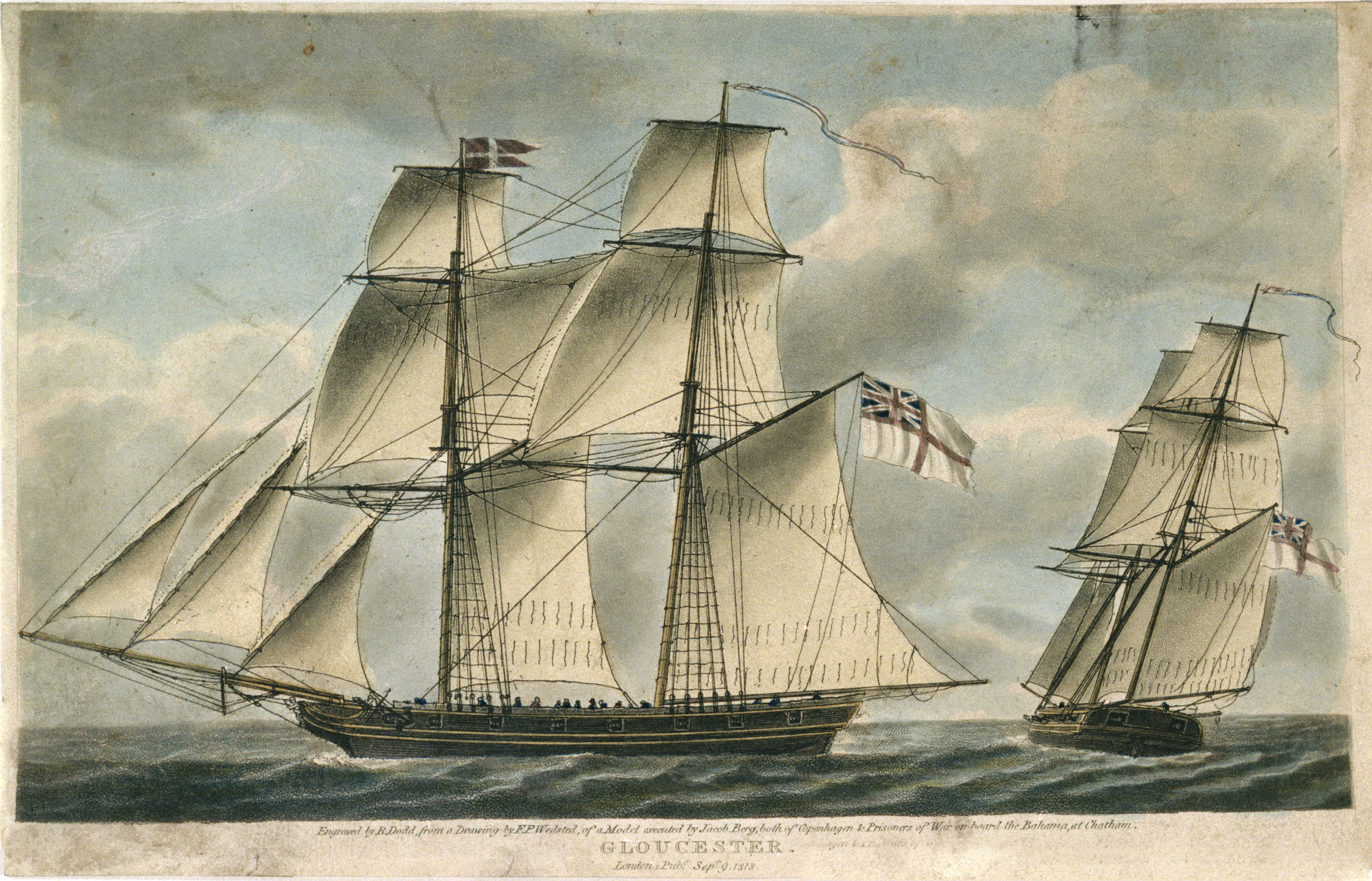
HMS Duke of Gloucester spent time anchored at Prescott during the War of 1812.

At the declaration of war, eight American schooners were docked at the Ogdensburg harbour. Unprotected, the schooners attempted to escape potential capture by sailing to Sackets Harbor, New York, but they were quickly observed and two of them were captured by British forces, who forced the crews and passengers to disembark on an island before burning the ships' cargoes; the remaining schooners retreated to Ogdensburg. In July, the armed schooner USS Julia, along with a Durham boat carrying a US rifle company, was sent downriver from Sackets Harbor to protect the merchant schooners. However, the Julia was intercepted at Morristown by the brig HMS Earl of Moira. The merchant schooners were ultimately able to escape later in the summer of 1812. Two American colonels, Solomon van Rensselaer and Thomas B. Benedict, formed a plan around this time to raid the harbour at Prescott and burn HMS Duke of Gloucester, but this plan never materialized.

==== Fortification efforts ====
These conflicts made authorities of Prescott believe it was necessary to build a fortification in the town. In July, residents were employed to build a stockade which would be the main point of defence between Montreal and Kingston during the war. This would become the first Fort Wellington, consisting of a square blockhouse built of wood and earth with barracks, officers' quarters, stables and storerooms being added shortly after. The first fort needed to be built quickly, and as a result, it was ill-constructed and primitive. The second fort, which still stands today, was built in 1838.

In late August 1812, Prescott received news that General Brock had captured Detroit; however, in September, a surprise raid took place at Gananoque, which was poorly defended. The American raiders seized arms and ammunition, as well as set fire to a storehouse. By the fall of 1812, Prescott and Ogdensburg were maintaining friendly relations; however, in September this changed when the Americans reinforced the town and fired at convoys of bateaux moving up the river with British supplies. The British failed to retaliate at this time. A few months later, in February 1813, the Americans attacked the area again, this time at Elizabethtown (now Brockville); American troops marched to the courthouse and freed the prisoners while taking prominent citizens of the city prisoner.

These attacks by the Americans angered the British troops of Fort Wellington, who decided to take revenge on the Ogdensburg troops for their raids of the area and other provocations. The garrison, led by Lieutenant-Colonel "Red George" MacDonell, set out across the frozen St. Lawrence River on foot so that the American troops would assume they were performing a drill. Instead, the plan was for the Glengarry Light Infantry to attack the fort and barracks, while the Fort Wellington garrison attacked the flank. Initially, the 500 men stationed at the Ogdensburg fort refused to surrender; however, when British troops entered the fort the Americans evacuated the fort and retreated 23 kilometres (14 mi).

According to MacDonell's account of the following events, the troops then burned the old and new barracks, as well as two schooners, the gunboats, guardhouses, scows, and a few houses. Overall, the attack was a success for the Fort Wellington soldiers. Prescott saw no further action, and the war ended soon after in 1814.

=== Battle of the Windmill ===
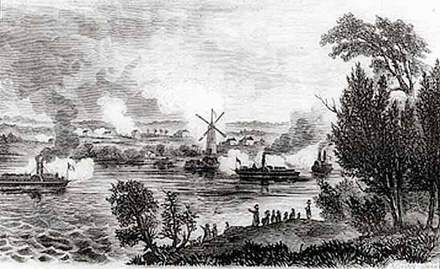
Battle of the Windmill

Fort Wellington became part of its second conflict in 1838, known as the Battle of the Windmill. This battle occurred when a small group of American soldiers called Patriots were convinced that the Canadians across the river in Prescott wanted to be freed from British "oppression" and essentially wanted to restart the rebellion by planning an invasion. Although no war ended up occurring, a battle took place when the Patriots attempted to cross into Prescott. The currents of the St. Lawrence caused problems, trapping their vessels on sandbars before forcing them to land east of Prescott in the new town of Newport, the site of a stone windmill. This gave troops from Fort Wellington plenty of time to prepare for what they assumed was an attack. The Americans eventually surrendered to the British troops, and were sent to Kingston for trial; eleven people, including their leader, were executed as punishment.

== Transport industry ==
=== Freight forwarding ===
Due to Prescott's location at the head of the rapids and its excellent harbour, it became a vital transfer point for freight travelling up the river. In 1810, a wharf and warehouse were built and a forwarding business was established by a William Gilkinson; it was the first of many forwarding operations in the town. Prescott exported large amounts of lumber, potash, and other goods. The forwarding trade led to shipbuilding developments also taking place in Prescott, with many ships being launched from its harbour. Prescott forwarders, by 1833, had formed well-established connections with the steamboat lines running from Prescott to Montreal which allowed the forwarders here to prosper over others in the area.

Forwarding became obsolete in the area much later, with the establishment of the railroads. The original forwarding warehouse built by Gilkinson is still standing, currently used as a museum dedicated to Prescott's forwarding industry. The building is made of stone but has been covered in white stucco. It was used as an American consulate, a lawyer's office, and later a laundromat before being purchased by the historical society in 1970.

=== Railway development ===
The Bytown and Prescott Railway (B&PR) was built between Bytown (which later evolved into the city of Ottawa) and Prescott in the early 1850s. In this era, Bytown was an isolated lumber town, while Prescott was an established community whose harbour was attractive to Bytown businessmen. Construction began at Prescott in late April 1854 and proceeded north toward Bytown. Unofficial passenger trips began almost immediately, and the first official passenger trip was on June 21 and was organized by the local Sons of Temperance. Regular service to Kemptville began on 9 September 1854, with the remainder of the trip to Bytown being by stagecoach and steamship. By November 4, trains had reached Gloucester, just a stagecoach ride away from Bytown. Local oral tradition holds that the first train into Bytown was on Christmas Day of 1854, but other evidence indicates a date no earlier than December 29, and possibly as late as January 1855.

Following the establishment of the Bytown and Prescott Railway, Prescott became the connection point for two significant routes to the outside world. The first, as planned, was the set of connections available at Prescott's harbour, primarily the ferry to Ogdensburg, The ferry between Prescott and Ogdensburg provided a convenient route between Ottawa, which was growing in importance, and New York. There, cars could be transferred to American railways such as the Rome, Watertown and Ogdensburg Railroad, which later became a part of the New York Central Railroad system. For several months, this was the only connecting route available at Prescott, as the Grand Trunk Railway mainline through the area, the second connection to the outside world, had not yet opened. After the Grand Trunk line (which now exists in the form of the CN Kingston Subdivision) opened, an issue presented itself: the connection between the two railways at Prescott Junction represented a break of gauge between the B&PR's standard gauge, and the broad Provincial gauge the Grand Trunk used at the time. This required transshipment of goods by hand between the two railways, which was laborious and time-consuming. The Ogdensburg Railroad was highly motivated to pursue interchange with the Grand Trunk for economic reasons, as lake traffic at smaller harbours like Ogdensburg had declined due to competition from the large east–west railways, such as the Great Western Railway; this made the car ferry service and interchange at Prescott vital to the American railway's continued survival.

=== Car ferry service ===
Solutions to the problem of mixed gauges relied on the cooperation of all three railways: the Grand Trunk, the Ottawa and Prescott, and the Ogdensburg. An agreement between the Ogdensburg and the Grand Trunk was secured in the fall of 1862, and shortly afterward the Grand Trunk negotiated with the Ottawa and Prescott for running rights to the Prescott waterfront. This included the laying of a third rail, creating a short dual gauge system which would accommodate the Grand Trunk's broad-gauge cars. The Ogdensburg Railroad provided a newly built car ferry, the St. Lawrence, (Note: The St. Lawrence was built at the Ogdensburg shipyard of Harrison C. Pearson. It had an iron-sheathed wooden hull, making it capable of winter service. It weighed 244 short tons (218 long tons).) which carried the broad-gauge cars brought by the Grand Trunk to Ogdensburg, where the freight was transferred to standard-gauge cars. The Grand Trunk also pursued adjustable-gauge technology across its whole system throughout the 1860s. By 1871, the Ottawa and Prescott had also developed gauge-changing facilities at Prescott Junction that utilized the Grand Trunk's adjustable-gauge technology, which was "likely for the benefit of Ottawa-bound freight." Ultimately, the Grand Trunk solved the problem throughout its entire system by abandoning Provincial gauge for standard gauge, rendering earlier solutions redundant.

With the mixed gauge problem eliminated, harmonized railway and harbour infrastructure at Prescott continued to develop. Dana Ashdown writes in Railway Steamships of Ontario that "[t]he harbour, because of its position above the St. Lawrence rapids, was also an important grain transfer point between the larger Great Lakes ships and the railways and smaller canal-type ships and barges." Indeed, a 20,000-bushel wooden grain elevator was built in the 1870s, along with a floating transfer elevator, both owned by the St. Lawrence and Ottawa Railway (the Ottawa and Prescott Railway's successor following its 1866 bankruptcy and restructuring).

The Prescott–Ogdensburg connection suffered a serious blow when, in 1873, the St. Lawrence failed a hull inspection and was retired. This time, a Prescott coal merchant named Isaac D. Purkis intervened. Purkis purchased a new ferry, the Transit, (Note: The Transit was built at the Robert Davis and Z. W. Wright shipyard in Clayton, New York. It weighed 141 short tons (126 long tons).) which arrived for service in 1874. The Transit could only carry three rail cars, as opposed to the St. Lawrence's six, but still managed to carry up to fifty freight cars across the river in a single day. Purkis soon acquired steamers to handle passengers and less-than-carload freight. These were the Caribou, (Note: The Caribou was built in 1868 by Augustin Cantin of Montreal. It weighed 114 short tons (102 long tons).) the City of Belleville, (Note: The City of Belleville was a product of the Shickluna Shipyards at St. Catharines. It was built in 1878 and weighed 101 short tons (90 long tons).) the Henry Plumb, and the Outing. In 1880, Purkis purchased a car float named the Jumbo, (Note: The Jumbo was built in Sorel, Quebec. It weighed 150 short tons (130 long tons) and was named after the famous circus and zoo elephant, Jumbo.) which was normally towed by the City of Belleville or the Henry Plumb, providing capacity for an additional three freight cars.

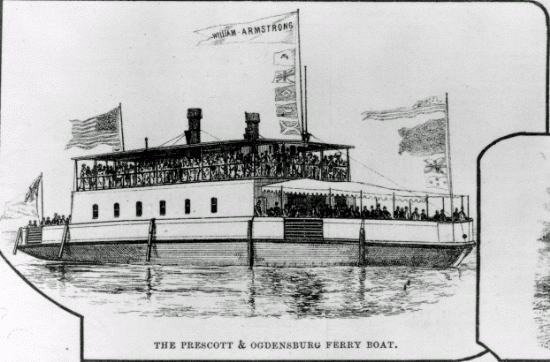
The William Armstrong in an 1878 illustration.

Purkis and the Prescott–Ogdensburg crossing soon had an upriver competitor, however. A Brockville businessman named Captain David H. Lyon commissioned his own passenger steamer, the William Armstrong, (Note: The William Armstrong was launched in November 1876 by the Ogdensburg shopbuilders A. & J. W. Wood.) which provided ferry service between Brockville and Morristown, New York. At the time, Brockville was served by the aging Brockville and Ottawa Railway (soon merged into the Canada Central Railway), which used the first railway tunnel in Canada, the Brockville Tunnel, to access the harbour. Morristown was served by an extension of the Utica and Black River Railroad into the town. The Brockville crossing was at a disadvantage, however, due to its own issues with mismatched gauges, as the Canada Central Railway continued to use broad gauge into the early 1880s. This situation would change significantly when a new railway appeared on the scene: the fledgling Canadian Pacific Railway, chartered with the purpose of constructing a transcontinental route that would unite the disparate Canadian provinces using infrastructure. The Canadian Pacific Railway, eager to gain advantages against its much older and more established competitor, the Grand Trunk, bought up a number of shortlines in Ontario, including the Canada Central. Canadian Pacific had built its own lines using standard gauge from the start, and soon after its acquisition of the Canada Central in 1881, much of the Canada Central's mainline had been converted to standard gauge, allowing the possibility of a convenient car ferry service between Belleville and Morristown. Lyon hastily converted the William Armstrong for car ferry service by cutting out the middle of the ship's superstructure and installing a section of rail track capable of holding three cars. Now a direct competitor of Purkis' ferry line in Prescott, he did not struggle for business. Canadian Pacific (which in 1884 also acquired the St. Lawrence and Ottawa Railway, giving it control over the Canadian side of both crossings) heavily favoured the Belleville route, promoting it as "The Quickest Route between Montreal and the cities of Central and Western New York", but the Belleville crossing still never displaced the Prescott one, which was preferred by shippers. Unwilling to be left out, Lyon soon began operating the William Armstrong at Prescott as well, then in 1888, incorporated his ferry line as the Canadian Pacific Car and Passenger Transfer Company. Purkis, in turn, began operating his ships between Brockville and Morristown, giving both lines a presence at each crossing.

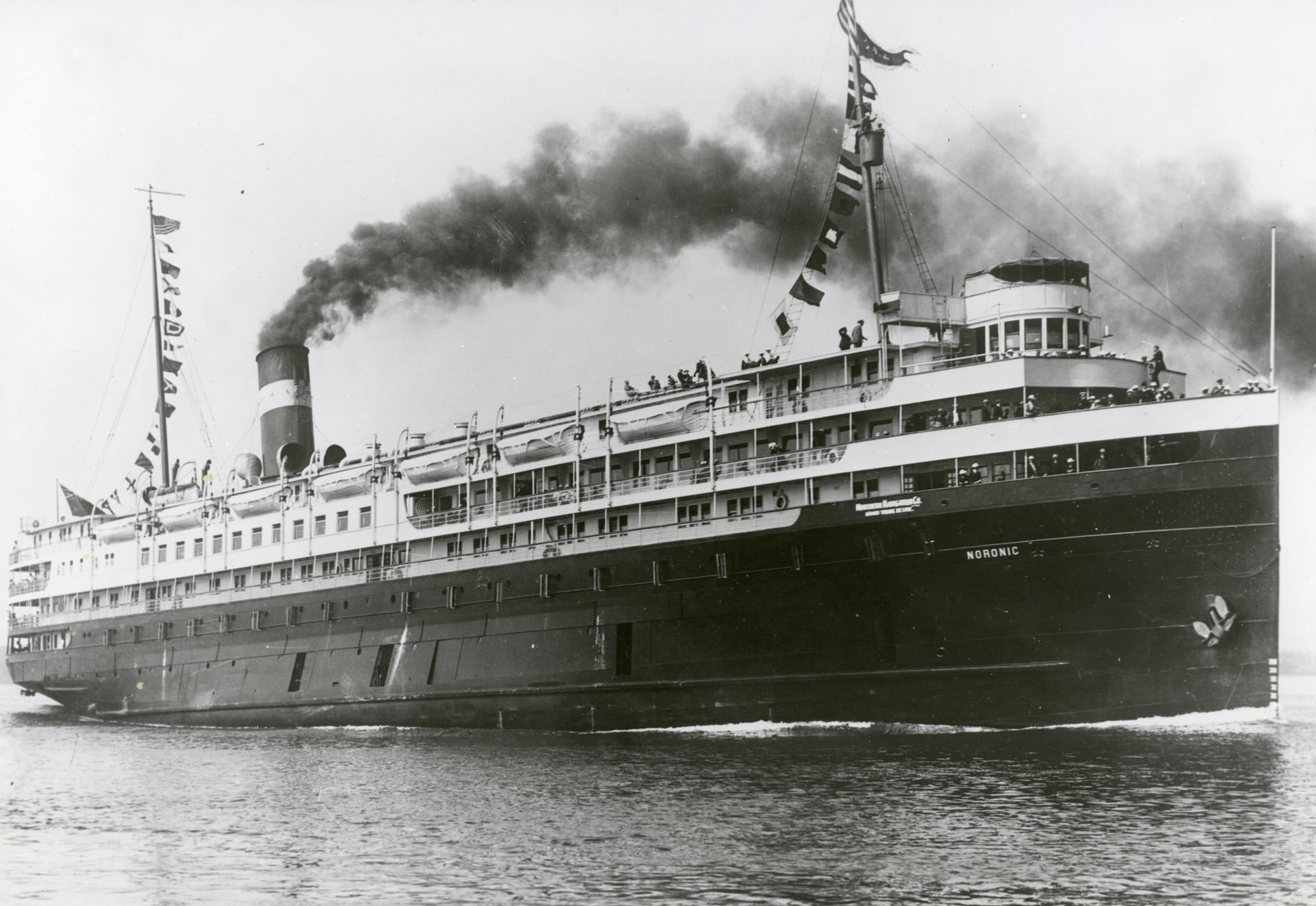
The SS Noronic at Prescott around 1939.

In 1896, Lyon moved his entire operation to Prescott. Freight shipments through Ogdensburg, of which the majority likely also passed through Prescott, reached 307,827 tons in total. (Note: Specifically, 209,875 tons moved north (much of it likely to Prescott) and 97,952 tons moved south (likely having passed through Prescott along the way). The vast majority of northbound freight was composed of coal (115,286 tons) and cereals (69,880 tons), while southbound freight was largely lumber (81,606 tons).) Lyon commissioned a new ferry in 1907, the Charles Lyon, (Note: The Charles Lyon was named after Lyon's father, and before its launch in December 1907, was originally meant to be named the Ogdensburg. It weighed 1,658 short tons (1,480 long tons), making it "larger than all the [Canadian Pacific Car and Passenger Transfer Company]'s previous passenger and car ferries put together." It was constructed in steel by the Polson Iron Works in Toronto. It was remarkable for several unusual design features, such as a three-track deck configuration (different from any other ship operating in the Great Lakes region) which only allowed up to two tracks, with six cars per track, to be loaded. The third centre track was likely intended to avoid imbalances which would affect the ship and cause serious listing. It was also a double-ended ship, which simplified operations by eliminating the need to back the ship into and out of ferry slips.) which could carry up to twelve freight cars.

== Project Jericho ==
In the late 1980s, Prescott became infamous when one of the largest sexual abuse investigations in Canada was conducted, dubbed Project Jericho. The multiple-victim and multiple-offender case began in August 1989, after a young girl disclosed the details of the abuse to her foster parents. Five years later, close to 300 victims and over 100 perpetrators had been named in the investigations. This case was unique, as never before had a multi-victim, multi-offender case of this magnitude been confined to such a small, defined, geographical region without being enclosed within an institution. According to some sources, Project Jericho remains the largest sex abuse investigation in Canadian history. The investigation was a joint effort between many organizations; Project Jericho consisted of members of the Ontario Provincial Police and local police departments, a Special Crown Attorney and victim/witness assistance coordinator, Family and Children's Services of Leeds-Grenville, the town of Prescott council, the Ontario government's Ministry of Community and Social Services, as well as the Adult Mental Health services.

The precise nature of the abuse varied from victim to victim, and is still disputed to this day. According to initial reports, the seven-year-old female who came forward in 1989 stated that on top of the sexual abuse, she and other children were submerged in water, confined beneath the floor, and forced to drink "yucky juice", which some have speculated to be blood. Additionally, adults are said to have terrorized or threatened her and other children with guns, knives and other weapons. Many of these abuses were documented on videotape. In addition to the abuse, victims alleged an infant boy, known only as "Joshua", had been murdered by the accused abusers. Little information is known regarding the infant or the murder, and no body was ever found. Project Jericho was named in honour of the alleged murder victim.

By 1990, arrests were being made with charges against four individuals being laid while 37 individuals were confirmed or suspected victims; some children began to be removed from their homes. By 1994, the total number of child victims had skyrocketed to 162, with the number of perpetrators being 119. Of these offenders, 97 were male and 22 were female. The victims were primarily child victims, around 162 being children; while 113 were adults, who came forward to disclose abuse suffered as children. Of the 65 cases that went to trial, the investigation saw a conviction rate of 91%.

== See also ==
- History of Ontario
- Military history of Canada
