= Benjamin Forsyth =

United States Army officer (c. 1760–1814)

- Born: c. 1760
- Died: June 28, 1814 (aged 53–54); Odell Town, Lower Canada
- Burial place: Glenwood Cemetery, Champlain, New York, U.S.
- Military career
- Branch: United States Army
- Service years: 1800, 1808–1814
- Rank: Brevet Lieutenant-Colonel
- Unit: Regiment of Riflemen
- Battles: War of 1812: Raid on Elizabethtown; Battle of Ogdensburg; Battle of York; Battle of Fort George

Brevet Lieutenant-Colonel Benjamin Forsyth (c. 1760 – June 28, 1814) served as a United States Army officer during the War of 1812. Born in North Carolina, Forsyth joined the United States Army in 1800 as an officer and was a captain of the Regiment of Riflemen at the outbreak of war in 1812. He led raids into Upper Canada along the Saint Lawrence River in 1812–13 before transferring south and taking part in the battles of York and Fort George. Brevetted to lieutenant-colonel, he held command along Lake Champlain. He was mortally wounded at Odell Town, Lower Canada, in 1814.

== Early life and military career ==
Forsyth was born, c. 1760, to James and Elizabeth Forsyth. Area records show he purchased land in Stokes County in 1794. In 1797 he married Bethemia Ladd. He was commissioned as a second lieutenant in the 6th Infantry Regiment on April 24, 1800, and was discharged on June 15, 1800. He was commissioned as a captain in the Regiment of Riflemen on 1 July 1808.

== War of 1812 ==
Based at Ogdensburg, New York during the autumn and winter of 1812, he led the successful Raid on Gananoque and other attacks across the Saint Lawrence River, which threatened the British supply lines to their forces in Upper Canada. In February 1813, the British used a temporary superiority in strength to drive Forsyth from his positions at the Battle of Ogdensburg.

On October 24, 1812, Forsyth wrote to President James Madison that he had served as a captain for four years without promotion and requested a brevet promotion in recognition of his service. Forsyth was promoted (not brevetted) to major on January 20, 1813, and brevetted to lieutenant colonel on February 6, 1813.

The Raid on Elizabethtown occurred on February 7, 1813, when Benjamin Forsyth and 200 men crossed the frozen St. Lawrence River to occupy Elizabethtown and seize military and public stores, free American prisoners, then capture British military prisoners.

Forsyth's company was ordered to join the main American force at Sackett's Harbor rather than reoccupy Ogdensburg. They led the American assault at the Battle of York, and played a major part at the Battle of Fort George.

Later in the year, Forsyth (now a major) and his men took part in the campaign aimed at capturing Montreal, but were not present at the Battle of Crysler's Farm. Forsyth was promoted to brevet Lieutenant Colonel the following winter. He was active in skirmishing and patrolling north of Lake Champlain in the late spring and summer and was killed in June 1814 in a clash at Odelltown, Lower Canada.

== Honors ==
Forsyth County, North Carolina, and Forsyth Street on Manhattan's Lower East Side is named in his honor.
