= Puthuff =

Puthuff is a surname. Notable people with the surname include:

- Hanson Puthuff (1875–1972), American painter
- William H. Puthuff (1768/1769–1824), American soldier, businessman, and politician
