= Regiment of Riflemen =

US military unit of War of 1812 era

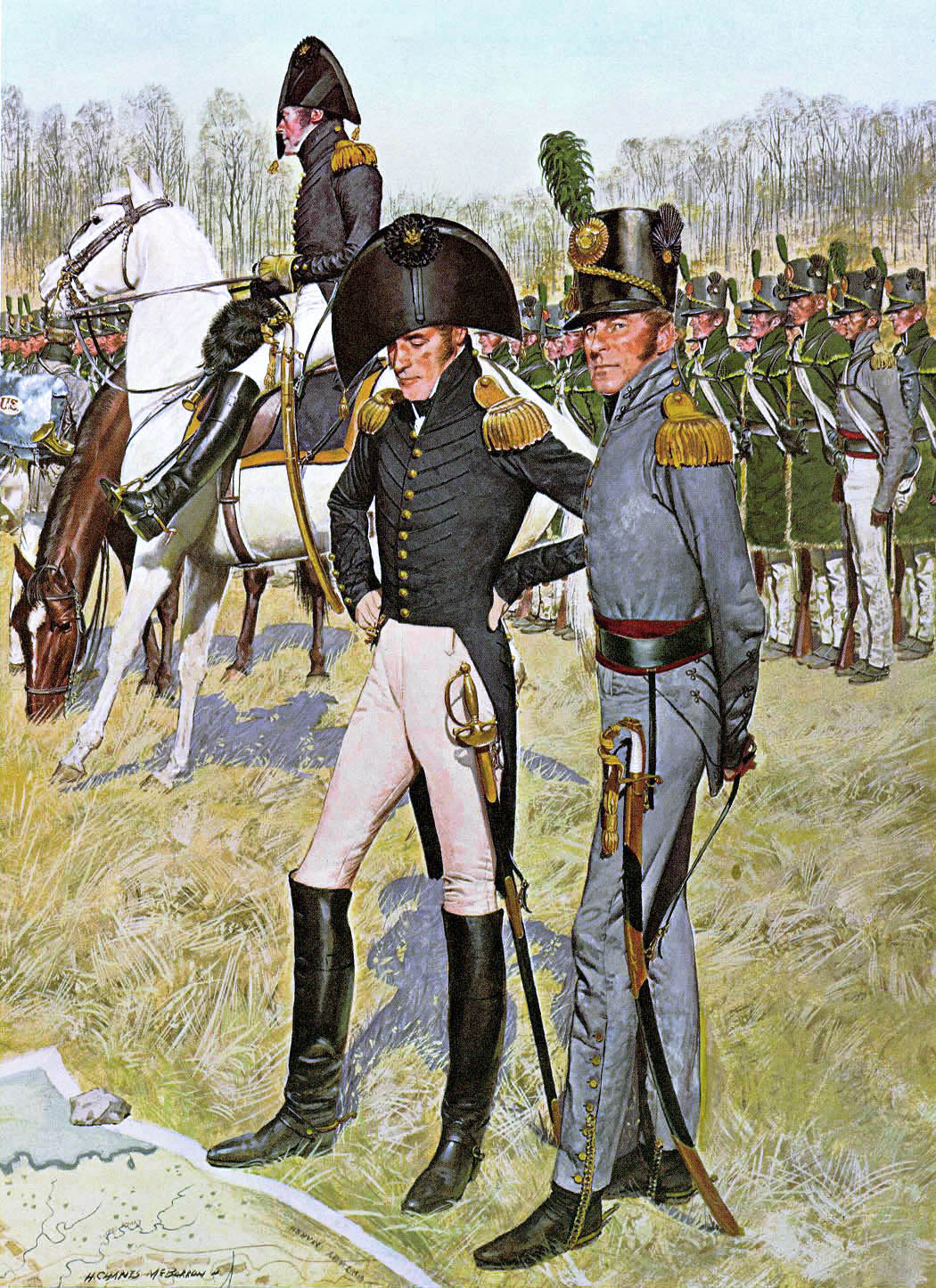
- Regimental troops in 1814
- Active: 1808–1821
- Disbanded: March 2, 1821
- Country: United States
- Branch: United States Army
- Type: Infantry
- Role: Light infantry
- Size: Regiment
- Posts: New Orleans, Territory of Louisiana; Washington, Mississippi Territory; Fort Atkinson, Louisiana Purchase
- Weapons: Harpers Ferry Model 1803; U.S. Model 1814 scalping knife tomahawk,
- Engagements: Tecumseh's War: Battle of Tippecanoe; War of 1812: Raid on Gananoque; Assault on Ogdensburg; Raid on Elizabethtown; Battle of Ogdensburg; Battle of York; Battle of Fort George; Battle of Point Iroquois; Battle of Crysler's Farm; Occupation of Cornwall; Battle of Big Sandy Creek; Battle of Conjocta Creek; Siege of Fort Erie; Battle of Plattsburgh
- Campaigns: Battle of Tippecanoe; War of 1812

Commanders
- Commanders: Alexander Smyth (1808–1812); Thomas Adams Smith (1812–1814, 1815–1818); George Washington Sevier (1814–1815); Talbot Chambers (1818–1821)
- Key Subordinate Commanders: Benjamin Forsyth; Daniel Appling; Lodowick Morgan

Insignia
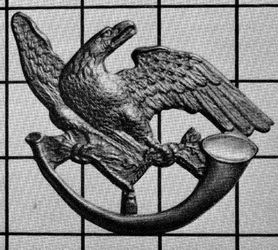
- Cap insignia authorized in 1817

The Regiment of Riflemen was a rifle regiment of the United States Army. Unlike the Army's line infantry regiments which were equipped with smoothbore muskets and blue and white uniforms, the regiment was focused on specialist light infantry tactics, and were accordingly issued rifles and dark green and black uniforms to take better advantage of cover. This was the first U.S. rifleman formation since the end of the American Revolutionary War 25 years earlier.

Where can you find troops more efficient than Morgan's riflemen of the Revolution or Forsyth's riflemen of the last war with Great Britain?

— Major Bennet Riley, U.S. Army, Letter to Lewis F. Linn

The regiment was raised in 1808. During the War of 1812, it was temporarily designated as the 1st Regiment of Riflemen when the United States Department of War raised three additional rifle regiments. The regiment never fought as a unit. Companies, detachment from companies or collections of companies were stationed at a distance from each other and were often allocated to other commands. After the War, the other three regiments were inactivated and the regiment reverted to its unnumbered designation. The regiment was disbanded in 1821.

== Background ==
On April 12, 1808, following the Chesapeake–Leopard affair, the U.S. Congress passed legislation authorizing an increase in the size of the U.S. Army, to include a regiment of riflemen.

== Organization ==
The headquarters of the regiment was authorized one colonel, one lieutenant colonel, one major, and administrative and support officers. The winter uniform of the regiment was green jackets with black collars and cuffs; the summer uniform was green hunting shirts and pantaloons with buff fringe. In 1814, uniform regulations specified gray cloth.

Companies were raised in various jurisdictions: three in New York and Vermont; three in the Louisiana and Mississippi Territories; and four in Ohio, Kentucky, and the Indiana Territory. Each company had an authorized strength of 84, including 68 privates; companies rarely attained their authorized strength. Regimental depots were placed in Shepherdstown, Virginia, and Savannah, Georgia.

On February 10, 1814, an act of Congress raised an additional three regiments of riflemen. The Regiment of Riflemen was subsequently redesignated as the 1st Regiment of Riflemen while the additional three were designated as the 2nd, 3rd and 4th regiments. Nevertheless, the four regiments were consolidated again on March 3, 1815, by a further act of Congress. As a result, the 2nd, 3rd and 4th Regiments of Riflemen were disbanded and the 1st reverted to its unnumbered designation.

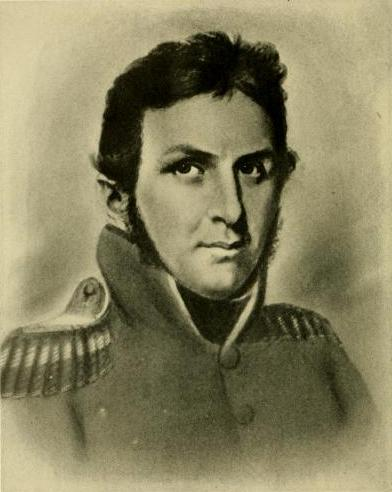
General Thomas Adams Smith

== Service in the Pre-war ==
=== New Orleans ===
By 1810, over half of the regiment's officers and men were stationed in New Orleans or in Washington, Mississippi Territory.

=== Battle at Tippecanoe ===
On November 7, 1811, a detachment of riflemen attached to the 4th Infantry Regiment fought at Tippecanoe. Because rifles took longer to load than muskets, the riflemen were armed with muskets. During a night action, the riflemen inflicted heavy casualties of Native American forces.

== Service in the War of 1812 ==
When war was declared on June 18, 1812, Captain Benjamin Forsyth's company of the regiment was stationed in New York City. In July 1812, Forsyth led his company to Sacketts Harbor, New York from which, on September 20–21, 1812, he, his company and supporting militia attacked British stores at Gananoque, Upper Canada. Forsyth surprised the Canadian militiamen and was able to capture muskets, ammunition and prisoners. Forsyth's party set fire to stores they could not carry and returned safely to Sackets Harbor from the raid. Forsyth's losses were one man killed and one wounded.

In October 1812, two companies of riflemen were assigned to participate in the Battle of Queenston Heights; however disagreement between Major General Stephen Van Rensselaer and Brigadier General Alexander Smyth resulted in those companies being withdrawn because Smyth thought it more important that they clean their camp following a storm. Ultimately, the U.S. attempt to take Queenston failed.

Forsyth was promoted to major during the winter and on February 6–7, 1813, led a multi-company force of the regiment in a raid on Elizabethtown, Upper Canada, from Ogdensburg, New York, which resulted in the freeing of American prisoners, the capture of Canadian prisoners and the re-capture of arms that had been taken by the British at the Battle of Detroit. Forsyth was brevetted to lieutenant colonel for distinguished service with a date of rank of February 6, 1813. Forsyth proved to be an aggravation to the British commanders in Upper Canada and on February 22, 1813, he and his troops were driven out of Ogdensburg by a superior force of British soldiers led by Lieutenant Colonel George MacDonnell after causing heavy casualties to one of the two attacking British columns. Forsyth requested re-enforcements from Colonel Alexander Macomb at Sacketts Harbor to retake Ogdensburg, but Macomb provided no troops and Forsyth led his riflemen back to Sacketts Harbor.

The riflemen under Forsyth later made an amphibious landing under a heavy fire from Indians and other troops near York, Upper Canada on April 27, 1813. The battle lasted nearly 30 minutes during which the British force, including a grenadier company of the 8th (The King's) Regiment of Foot was repulsed with heavy losses. After Brigadier General Zebulon Pike landed re-enforcements, the British retreated to their fortifications. As U.S. troops approached the British, a magazine exploded, resulting in more than 100 casualties, including Pike. The American troops then burnt the York Parliament buildings.

On May 27, 1813, a battalion of the regiment commanded by Forsyth executed another amphibious assault and participated in the capture of Fort George, Upper Canada. After taking the fort, US troops attempted to pursue the retreating British forces but Major General Morgan Lewis recalled the battalion when he feared an ambush. Forsyth's riflemen where then employed as an advance force and on November 7–9, 1813 they engaged a large Canadian force at Hoople's Creek near Cornwall, Upper Canada, concurrent with the Battle of Crysler's Farm. Although the riflemen performed well and the Americans persevered at Hoople's Creek, the Canadians drove the Americans from the farm and Major General James Wilkinson withdrew to winter quarters. Forsyth was killed in action on June 28, 1814.

Riflemen under the command of Major Daniel Appling participated in the Battle of Big Sandy Creek on May 30, 1814, during which they ambushed and captured a large detachment of British sailors, including two Royal Navy captains, and Royal Marines, sparing a shipment of large cannon from capture. Appling was brevetted to lieutenant colonel on May 30, 1814 for gallantry and to colonel on September 11, 1814 for distinguished service.

On August 3, 1814, another detachment of riflemen under the command of Major Ludowick Morgan ambushed and repelled a British raid at Conjockta Creek near Buffalo, New York, prior to the Siege of Fort Erie. Morgan and his troops, along with elements of the 4th Regiment of Riflemen, helped relieve the siege. Morgan was killed in action on August 12, 1814.

The regiment's last wartime action occurred after Britain and the United States agreed to end the war in the Treaty of Ghent. On January 13, 1815, Royal Marines and troops of the 2nd West India Regiment landed near Fort Peter, Saint Marys, Georgia. Captain Abraham A. Massais, who was commanding a force consisting of a company of the Regiment of Riflemen and a company of the 42nd Infantry Regiment, decided his command was outnumbered and executed a fighting retreat. The British demolished Fort Peter and re-embarked.

== Post-war ==
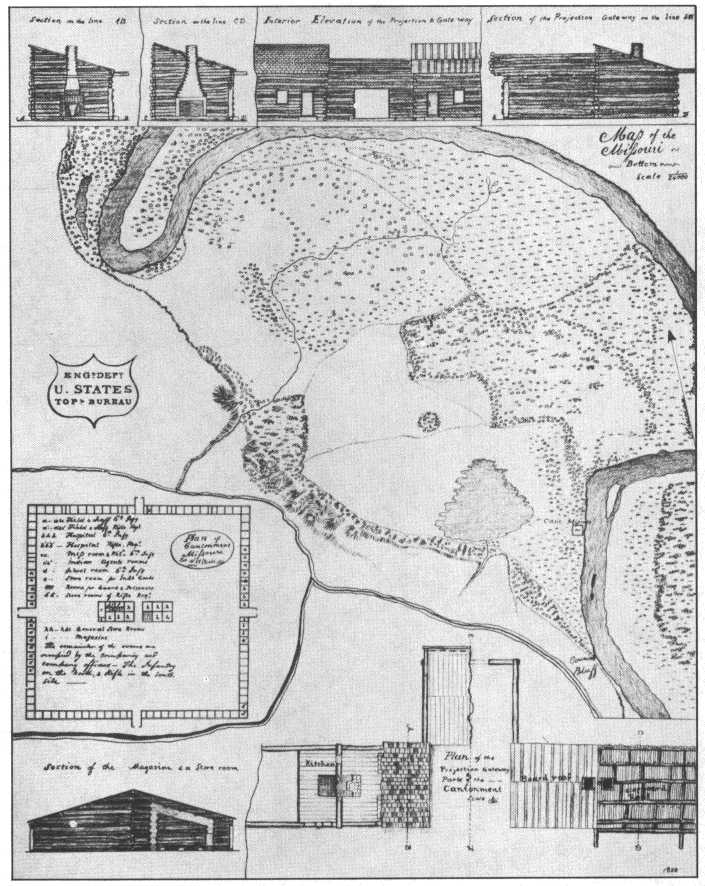
Plan of Cantonment Missouri

Following resumption of peace with Great Britain, the consolidated regiment was assigned to St. Louis, Missouri Territory. By 1817 the riflemen had contributed to the construction of Fort Armstrong, Rock Island, Illinois; Fort Crawford, Prairie du Chien, Wisconsin; Fort Howard, Green Bay, Wisconsin and Fort Smith, Arkansas. The last was named after Thomas Adams Smith.

In 1819, Secretary of War John C. Calhoun ordered the Yellowstone Expedition, commanded by Colonel Henry Atkinson, to act as a warning against British incursions. Companies of the Regiment of Riflemen and elements of the 6th Infantry Regiment worked together to build Fort Atkinson, Nebraska (then an unorganized area of the Louisiana Purchase). In 1820, Congress later declined to fund further advances.

== Inactivation ==
On March 2, 1821, Congress passed an act establishing an Army with no provision for a rifle regiment. The regiment was inactivated on June 1, 1821.

Under an act of Congress dated August 23, 1842 the 2nd Cavalry Regiment was re-designated as the Regiment of Riflemen effective March 4, 1843. This act was repealed on April 4, 1844, and the 2nd Cavalry Regiment reverted to its previous designation. There is no clear connection between the earlier and later regiments.

== External ==
- Insignia (Smithsonian Institution)
- War of 1812 Discharge Certificates
- First Battalion of the US Regiment of Riflemen Orderly Book at St. Louis Public Library
