= Daniel Appling =

United States Army officer (1787–1817)

- Born: August 29, 1787; Columbia County, Georgia
- Died: March 5, 1817 (aged 29); Montgomery County, Alabama
- Relatives: Rebecca C. Appling, Sister
- Military career
- Allegiance: United States
- Branch: United States Army
- Service years: 1805–1816
- Rank: Colonel
- Unit: Regiment of Riflemen
- Battles: Battle of Big Sandy Creek; Battle of Plattsburg

Daniel Appling (August 29, 1787 – March 5, 1817) was an officer in the United States Army during the first two decades of the nineteenth century. He was born and educated in Columbia County, Georgia. After joining the Army at age eighteen, he was commissioned into the Regiment of Riflemen, in which he served for his entire career. He led troops in Florida during the Patriot war and along the Niagara frontier during the War of 1812. Appling resigned his commission in 1816 and moved to Alabama. Appling died in 1817 (or possibly 1818). He died while the State of Georgia was procuring a sword to be presented to him in recognition of his service during the War of 1812. Appling County in Georgia is named after him, and a U.S. Naval vessel after the county.

== Early life and education ==
Appling was born in Columbia County, Georgia, to John and Rebecca (Carter) Appling. His father, prominent in the pioneer period in Upper Georgia, was a member of the convention of 1795 tasked with revising the State Constitution. He was educated in private schools judged to be among the best in Georgia, studying under David Bushnell, among others; his education included Greek and Latin.

== Career ==
=== Operations in Florida ===
In 1805, aged 18, Appling enlisted in the United States Army. On May 3, 1808, Appling was commissioned as a second lieutenant in the Regiment of Riflemen. Appling served as a recruiting officer for some time and was later stationed at Fort Hawkins, near Macon, Georgia under the command of Captain (later Brigadier General) Thomas A. Smith. He marched with his regiment to Point Peter on St. Mary's River in Georgia. He commanded troops on Amelia Island in Florida during the Patriot War. On July 1, 1809, Appling was promoted to first lieutenant, and on April 1, 1812 he was promoted to captain.

=== Battle of Big Sandy Creek ===
During the War of 1812, Appling was ordered to Sackets Harbor in New York. Navy Captain Melancthon Taylor Woolsey was assigned to transport cables and cannons needed to outfit a frigate, USS Superior, and other vessels from Oswego, New York, to Sackets Harbor. The equipment was loaded onto nineteen boats on the evening of May 28, 1814. Appling, who had been promoted to major the previous April 15 and 120 of his riflemen were assigned to support Woolsey. One of the boats was separated from the others and was captured by the British. Captain Sir James Yeo decided to pursue the remaining Americans, who had withdrawn up Big Sandy Creek to fortify their position. On the morning of 30 May, a large British force engaged the Americans. Appling, his riflemen and 120 Oneida Warriors had established an Ambuscade and surprised the British. The Battle of Big Sandy Creek lasted less than ten minutes and resulted in an overwhelming American victory. The Americans captured 143 prisoners (133 men and 10 officers), wounded 20 (18 men and 2 officers); and killed 14 (13 men and one officer). They also captured three gun-boats, one with a 24-pounder and a 63-pounder; two cutters; and one gig. Effective May 30, 1814, Appling was brevetted as a lieutenant colonel for gallant conduct in capturing a superior force of the enemy at the Battle of Big Sandy Creek.

=== Battle of Plattsburgh ===
During the Battle of Plattsburgh, Appling led 110 riflemen against General Sir George Prevost's attack, conducting a number of delaying actions on the Beckmantown Road. For his distinguished service there, he was brevetted as a colonel effective September 11, 1814.

== Resignation and death ==
On June 1, 1816, Appling resigned from the army; he returned to Georgia and later moved to Montgomery County, Alabama.

Appling died of pleurisy on March 5, 1817, in Montgomery County. An alternate date of death is March 18, 1818.

On December 22, 1819, a petition from Rebecca C. Appling, Daniel Appling's sister, requesting that prize money for the capture of the Royal Navy vessels equipment at the Battle of Big Sandy Creek be distributed to her and the men who had served under Daniel at the battle as would have happened if Daniel and his men had been in the U.S. Navy. On January 5, 1820, a bill in support of the petition failed to pass.

== Honors and namesakes ==
The Georgia Legislature awarded Appling a sword in recognition of the efforts during the War of 1812. Appling died before the sword could be delivered. The sword hung in the Governor's Office until 1883, when it was sent to the archives of the Georgia State Historical Society. In 1906, the sword was sent to be displayed in the Jamestown Exposition, but it never returned to Georgia. In 2010 the director of the Georgia Division of Archives and History saw an advertisement in an antiques magazine offering the sword for sale for $250,000. The Pennsylvania antiques collector and dealer gave Georgians until December 31 to raise $100,000 to purchase the sword or he would sell it to waiting buyers. An initiative by Friends of the Georgia Archives and the Daughters of the War of 1812 raised the money, and in 2012, the 200th anniversary of the War of 1812, the sword was returned to the state of Georgia and hung in the State Capitol's Hall of Valor. It is now in the possession of the Georgia Historical Society.

Appling County, Georgia, was named for Daniel Appling on December 15, 1818.

USS Appling, an attack transport named for Appling County, Georgia, was launched on April 9, 1944, and decommissioned on December 20, 1946. Appling earned three battle stars for her World War II service.
