= Raid on Elizabethtown =

Coordinates: 44.600°N 75.678°W

- Part of War of 1812
Date	February 7, 1813
Location	Elizabethtown, Leeds County, Upper Canada
Result	American victory

Belligerents
United Kingdom	United States

Commanders and leaders
(United Kingdom) Unknown	(United States) Benjamin Forsyth

Strength
Unknown	200 regulars and militia

Casualties and losses
1 wounded 16 American prisoners freed 52 British prisoners	1 wounded

The Raid on Elizabethtown occurred on February 7, 1813, when Major Benjamin Forsyth and 200 regulars and militia crossed the frozen St. Lawrence River to occupy Elizabethtown, Upper Canada (present day Brockville, Ontario), seize military and public stores, free American prisoners and capture British military prisoners. This was the second successful raid by Forsyth along the St. Lawrence River, having previously attacked Gananoque. The success of the two raids prompted a response by the British, which culminated in the Battle of Ogdensburg.

== Background ==
Following the termination of the armistice between British General George Prevost and American General Henry Dearborn, the Americans, suffering from a lack of supply in northern New York, raided the last British convoy-staging point along the St. Lawrence River at Gananoque between the large British bases of Montreal, Lower Canada and Kingston, Upper Canada. Led by Benjamin Forsyth, the raid was successful and the British did little in retaliation beyond increasing fortifications at Gananoque. The Americans celebrated Forsyth's success and he transferred his command from Sackets Harbor to Ogdensburg. On February 4, 1813, a British detachment from Prescott, Upper Canada crossed the St. Lawrence River on the ice and took a few prisoners at Ogdensburg.

== Raid ==
On February 6, Major Benjamin Forsyth of the United States Rifle Regiment, left Ogdensburg at 22:00 hours at the head of about 200 regulars and militia. He moved his troops to Morristown, New York by sleigh, twelve miles (19 km) up the river and across from Elizabethtown. Under the cover of darkness, Forsyth and his men crossed over to Elizabethtown on the ice at 01:00 hours on February 7, and took the town by surprise. He left a small cannon on the ice to cover his retreat if necessary.

As Forsyth moved through Elizabethtown, he set pickets to guard streets and moved to occupy the courthouse square. One American sentry was wounded and one British, but Forsyth met minimal resistance and captured 52 members of the garrison. One, a doctor, was paroled immediately. After capturing the courthouse, Forsyth freed the American prisoners from the jail and took stores, muskets and rifles. Forsyth set fire to the barracks and then began a 28-mile (45 km) march, returning to Ogdensburg without further action.

== Aftermath ==
Following his second successful raid, Forsyth was promoted to brevet lieutenant colonel. His performance convinced the British commanders that Ogdensburg had to be neutralized. Later that month on February 22, a British force led by Lieutenant Colonel George MacDonnell attacked Ogdensburg, driving Forsyth and the American garrison from the town. Forsyth's superior refused to retake the town, forcing Forsyth to relocate back to Sackets Harbor. Forsyth was later transferred to a different combat area altogether in a political move to appease the local population. The British assault on Ogdensburg would mark the end of significant land battles in the region, though gunboats operating from Sackets Harbor attacking convoys would later force the British to station naval forces in the area with their own gunboats.
