= Joel Stone =

- Born: 1749; Guilford, Connecticut, British America
- Died: 1833 (aged 83–84); Gananoque, Upper Canada
- Burial place: Willowbank Cemetery
- Spouse: Abigail Dayton
- Military career
- Rank: Colonel

Colonel Joel Stone (1749–1833) was a United Empire Loyalist and the founder of Gananoque in Ontario, Canada.

== Early life ==
Stone was born in Guilford, Connecticut, to Stephen Stone and Rebecca Bishop. When he was two, his family moved to the growing town of Litchfield, Connecticut. Although the son of a prosperous farmer, Stone ventured off on his own as a merchant. He married his first wife, Leah Moore, in 1780. They had two children together. He married his second wife, Abigail Dayton, in 1799. He died peacefully in 1833 at the age of 84.

== United Empire Loyalist ==
Stone was a Loyalist Combatant operating from New York City and Long Island during the Revolutionary war. With the outbreak of the American Revolution, Stone remained loyal to the King and fought on the British side. He was active in collaborating with Loyalists in Connecticut in escaping to British controlled areas of the colonies, including David Mathews, Mayor of New York City. He was forced to flee to British-controlled New York and was never able to return to his home because he was wanted for treason. He took up lands in Upper Canada.

== Founder of Gananoque, Ontario ==
In the 1790s after fleeing the United States on horse back in the night, Stone made his way to Upper Canada where he petitioned the king for a land grant due to his remaining loyal to the crown during the Revolution. He was granted 700 acres of land on the west side of the Gananoque River. He choose this area because of the two waterfalls on the river. Here he built a sawmill and a gristmill. This began the settlement that is known today as the town of Gananoque. He became a successful businessman in Gananoque and also began a ferry service as early as 1801 to move people, animals and produce across the Gananoque River. He was given many titles and official offices including roads commissioner, customs collector, colonel of the militia and justice of the peace. Thanks to his mills on the Gananoque River, many other mills were built and the town thrived as an industrial site by the end of the eighteenth century. It became a recreational launch point and tourist attraction for the Thousand Islands in modern times.

== War of 1812 ==
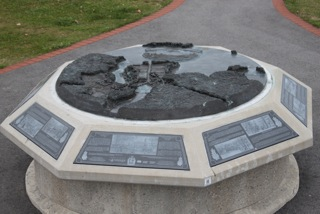
The monument in Joel Stone Park Gananoque of how the town looked during the War of 1812

He defended the town and area again in the War of 1812. Trade was very popular between the United States and Upper Canada, as it was easier for both sides to trade with each other than to obtain supplies from larger cities. Trade continued after international peace ended in June 1812 until Gananoque was attacked in September 1812. Stone's militia did its best to hold off the attack, but considerable damage was inflicted upon the settlement. Stone was absent at the time of the attack, escorting a convoy to Kingston. His wife, who was hiding the valuables in her home, was wounded after being shot in the hip. The war ended in 1814 with the signing of the Treaty of Ghent in Belgium. After the war, Stone lived comfortably until his death.

== Memorials ==
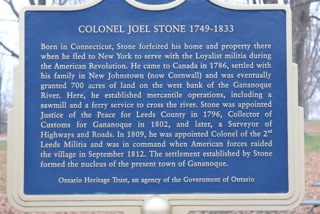
The plaque commemorating Joel Stone in Gananoque

Located in the town of Gananoque, near the town hall, is a plaque dedicated to Stone which reads:

Born in Connecticut, Stone forfeited his home and property there when he fled to New York to serve with the Loyalist militia during the American Revolution. He came to Canada in 1786, settled with his family in New Johnstown (now Cornwall) and was eventually granted 700 acres of land on the west bank of the Gananoque River. Here, he established mercantile operations, including a sawmill and a ferry service to cross the river. Stone was appointed Justice of the Peace for Leeds County in 1796, Collector of Customs for Gananoque in 1802, and later, a Surveyor of Highways and Roads. In 1809, he was appointed Colonel of the 2nd Leeds Militia and was in command when American forces raided the village in September 1812. The settlement established by Stone formed the nucleus of the present town of Gananoque.

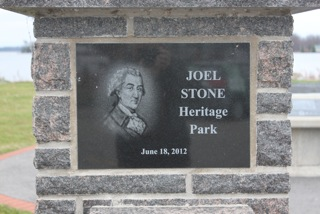
The plaque commemorating Stone at the Joel Stone Park in Gananoque

At the waterfront in the Town of Gananoque is a heritage park dedicated to Stone, named the Joel Stone Park. It has 3 cannon and a memorial commemorating the War of 1812. There is also a bronze diorama representing the town as it was in 1812, an amphitheater and the beginning of a heritage trail.

The town of Gananoque also commemorated the War of 1812 and Stone with re-enactments, festivals and ceremonies in 2012–2014 for the 200th anniversary of the war.

== See also ==
- Raid on Gananoque
