= Anthony Butler (diplomat) =

American diplomat and politician

Chargé d'Affaires to Mexico
- In office October 12, 1829 - October 21, 1835
- President: Andrew Jackson
- Preceded by: Joel Roberts Poinsett
- Succeeded by: Powhatan Ellis

Member of the Kentucky House of Representatives
- In office 1821–1822

Personal details
- Born: 1787 Clarendon County, South Carolina
- Died: April 18, 1849 (aged 61–62) Pointe Coupee Parish, Louisiana
- Party: Democratic

Military service
- Allegiance: United States
- Branch/service: United States Army
- Years of service: 1813–1815
- Rank: Colonel
- Commands: 2nd Regiment of Riflemen

Anthony Butler (1787 – April 18, 1849) was an American soldier, politician and diplomat who served as Chargé d'Affaires to Mexico.

== Birth and family life ==
Butler was born in South Carolina (probably Clarendon County) in 1787. He married the sister of Kentucky politician John J. Crittenden.

== Career ==
=== South Carolina ===
Butler became a Mason at St. Johns Lodge No. 37 at Santee, South Carolina the dates of his degrees are not known.

=== Kentucky ===
Butler moved to Logan County, Kentucky in 1807. Butler transferred his Masonic membership to Russellville Lodge No. 17 in Russellville, Kentucky in January 1809; he received additional Masonic degrees in 1813, served as the High Priest of Russellville Chapter No. 8, and served as the Masonic Grand Master of Kentucky in 1812, and 1813. In 1813, Butler was one of four men considered by the Kentucky legislature for the United States Senate; he placed third among the four contenders, losing to Jesse Bledsoe.

=== Army ===
Butler served in the War of 1812. He was commissioned as a lieutenant colonel of infantry in the U.S. Army on March 11, 1813, entering from Kentucky. He was first assigned to the 28th Infantry Regiment, then promoted to colonel of the 2nd Regiment of Riflemen on February 21, 1814. Russell James relates that he served under General Andrew Jackson; James Brenner places him under General Duncan McArthur. Butler was never in combat and spent most of his time in command of his regiment attempting to recruit soldiers in the Eighth Military District (Ohio, Kentucky and Tennessee), a problem that was exacerbated by having to compete for recruits with two other regiments of riflemen and four of infantry. Butler displayed a lack of knowledge about the proper employment of riflemen; Butler and his riflemen did function as a form of occupation force during the first six months of 1815. He was honorably discharged on June 15, 1815.

=== Kentucky ===
Butler owned a large plantation near Russellville. In 1818 and 1819, Butler ran for but did not win the seat in the Kentucky House of Representatives from Logan County. In 1820, Butler campaigned for Governor of Kentucky; in August, it was announced that John Adair had won, Butler placing fourth in a field of four. Butler ran again for the Kentucky House in 1821 and was elected. He resigned from the House on or before May 15, 1822.

=== Diplomatic career ===
Butler moved to Mississippi in 1829. While a resident of Mississippi, Butler lobbied Jackson (now president) to make him Chargé d'Affaires in Mexico. He was appointed to this position on October 12, 1829; his credentials were presented on January 29, 1830.

Jackson appointed Butler to the post because he wanted him to negotiate a purchase of Texas. Butler spoke no Spanish and had distinctly un-diplomatic manners. In April 1831, Butler successfully negotiated an extension to the period of ratification of the Treaty of Limits. Butler disregarded instructions from Secretary of State Martin Van Buren not to meddle in the internal affairs of Mexico. Butler bribed Mexican officials and recommended to Jackson that he dispatch troops annex Texas by force. Jackson distanced himself from his ambassador, especially after the latter had tried to bribe Santa Anna. Having failed to acquire Texas for the U.S., Butler suggested in 1833 a claim on part of the territory based on supposed confusion of the Sabine and Neches rivers; Butler himself had speculative interests in the area; at the same time that he was representing the U.S. in Mexico, Butler had agreements to represent two land companies, the Arkansas and Texas Land Company and the Trinity Land Company, that were trying to acquire property in Mexican Texas. Butler was recalled to Washington in January 1836 but remained in Mexico, reporting to Jackson before finally leaving in May. His tenure as chargé d'affaires mostly resulted in Mexican suspicion of United States' foreign policy through the beginning of the Mexican–American War.

=== Republic of Texas ===
Some time after Texas independence, Butler moved to Washington County, Texas and, in 1838, was elected to the House of Representatives of the Third Republic of Texas Legislature. Butler was the fourth Grand Master of Texas Masons in 1841. He attempted to consult with General Zachary Taylor when the Mexican War began. In 1847 or 1848, he moved from Texas.

== Death ==
Butler died on the burning steamboat General Pike on the Mississippi River in Pointe Coupee Parish, Louisiana, on April 18, 1849.

== See also ==
- O. P. Q. Letters
