= Raid on Gananoque =

1812 U.S. raid on Canada in the War of 1812

- Part of War of 1812
Date	21 September 1812
Location	Gananoque, Upper Canada
Result	American victory

Belligerents
United States	United Kingdom; Upper Canada

Commanders and leaders
Benjamin Forsyth	Joel Stone

Units involved
Regiment of Riflemen; New York Militia	2nd Regiment of Leeds Militia

Strength
110 regular infantry and militia	About 100 militia

Casualties and losses
1 killed 10 wounded	8 killed 8 prisoners Some wounded Stores seized Government depot burned 3,000 ball cartridges 41 muskets 150 barrels of provisions

The Raid on Gananoque was an action conducted by the United States Army on 21 September 1812 against Gananoque, Upper Canada during the War of 1812. The Americans sought to plunder ammunition and stores to resupply their own forces. Gananoque was a key point in the supply chain between Montreal and Kingston, the main base of the Provincial Marine on the Great Lakes. Under the command of Captain Benjamin Forsyth, the Americans departed Ogdensburg, New York and sailed to Gananoque, where they encountered resistance from the 2nd Regiment of Leeds Militia. The British militia was forced to retreat and the Americans successfully destroyed the storehouse and returned to the United States with captured supplies. As a result of the raid, the British strengthened their defences along the St. Lawrence River.

== Background ==
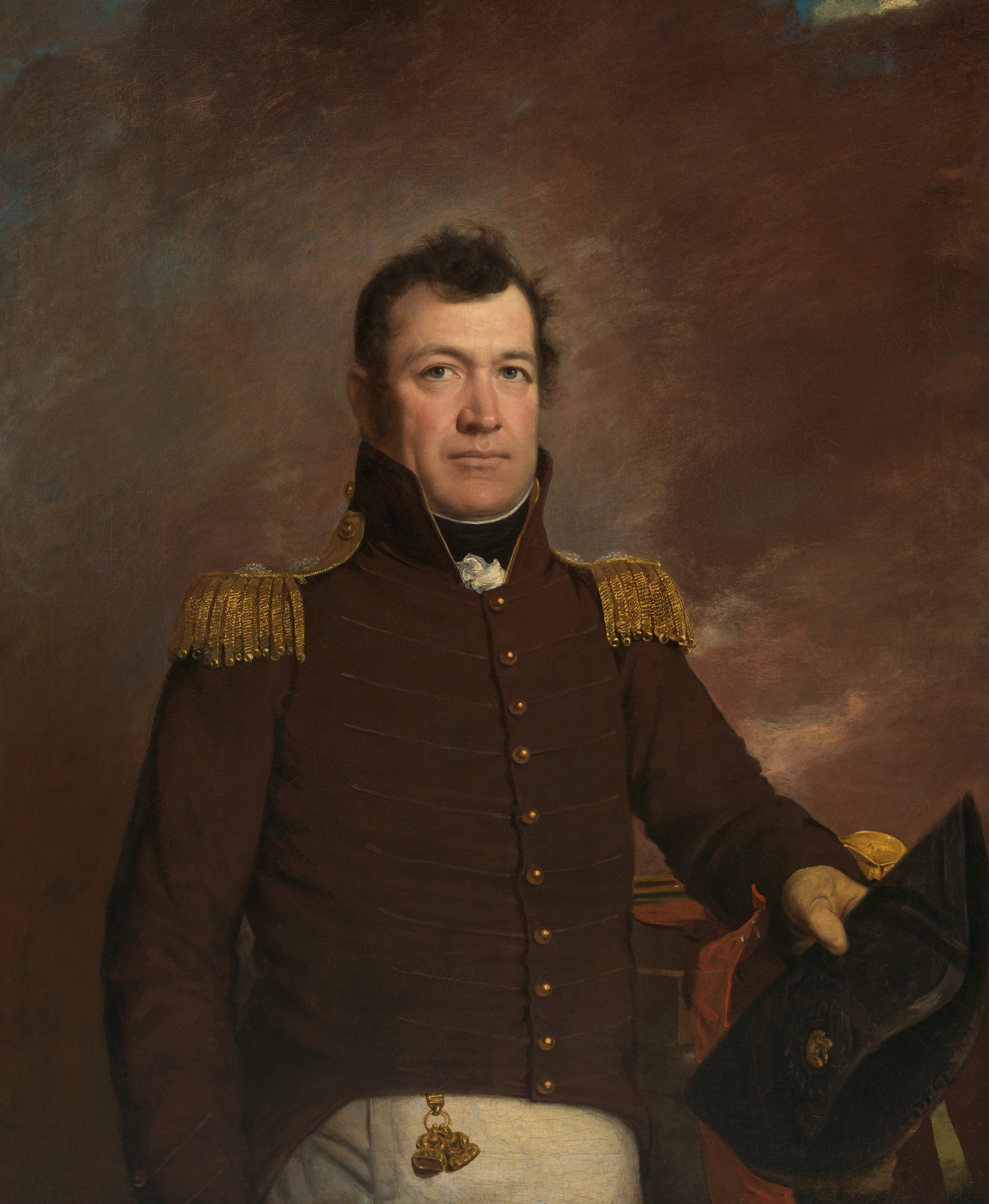
With the American garrison at Sackets Harbor running low on supplies and ammunition, Brig Gen Jacob Brown authorized a raid into Canadian territory.

Gananoque is located roughly 20 miles (32 km) from Kingston, the principal base of the British Provincial Marine on the Great Lakes and a key transshipment point. Gananoque served as a depot for ammunition, stores, foodstuffs along the St. Lawrence River route between Kingston and Montreal. Furthermore, it was the last convoy-staging point between Montreal and Kingston and a key point for communications between the two cities. The town had been settled in 1789 by Joel Stone, an American Loyalist who had arrived in Upper Canada following the American Revolutionary War. On 9 August 1812, General Sir George Prevost, commander of British forces in Canada and Major General Henry Dearborn commander of the United States forces in the north agree to a cessation of hostilities. President James Madison repudiated Dearborn's agreement on 15 August.

The American garrison at Sackets Harbor, New York under the command of Brigadier General Jacob Brown of the New York Militia was suffering from lack of supply. Brown himself had purchased blankets for his men. The garrison was reinforced by a company of the US Regiment of Riflemen on 14 September, but the reinforcements lacked ammunition. Finding no support from his superiors, Brown authorized a raid on Canadian territory to acquire supplies and ammunition following the termination of the armistice. Based on the intelligence that Brown had, Gananoque was lightly defended.

== Attack ==
Brown ordered the attack on Gananoque to be led by Captain Benjamin Forsyth of the Regiment of Riflemen. He was to take his company of 90 men and 20 members of the New York Militia under Captain Samuel McNitt and seize stores and ammunition. The force departed from Ogdensburg, New York on 18 September in boats and sailed to Gananoque, arriving on 21 September 1813. Forsyth landed his men 2 miles (3.2 km) west of Gananoque at Sheriff's Point and moved towards the town. The Americans surprised the 2nd Regiment of the Leeds Militia under the command of Colonel Joel Stone. The American force was spotted by two British dragoons approaching the town, and fired upon them wounding one, however both were able to escape and alert the town. Upon their arrival the Americans were met by 100 Leeds Militia under the command of Lieutenant Levi Soper which began firing. Forsyth moved his force to within 100 yards (91 m) of the Leeds Militia, and opened fire. He then ordered a charge, which drove the British militia back over a bridge. Forsyth's troops entered Gananoque and commandeered 3,000 ball cartridges and 41 muskets, while destroying 150 barrels of provisions, ransacking the storehouse and destroying the home of Colonel Stone. The Americans had one killed and ten wounded, while the British suffered eight killed, eight taken as prisoners of war and others wounded, including Colonel Stone's wife. Thirty minutes after landing, the Americans returned to their boats with their plunder and set off for Ogdensburg.

== Aftermath ==
A British party was sent to intercept Forsyth but failed to locate his force. The British party then landed at Burton's Point and burned a blockhouse and several boats before returning to Canada. Forsyth relocated his command to Ogdensburg and on 7 February 1813, raided again across the border, this time at Elizabethtown. The British replied with their own raid on Ogdensburg. The British acknowledged the threat to their supply lines and began transporting their equipment and troops in escorted convoys. Construction of a blockhouse began at Ganonoque in January 1813 and was finished later in the year.

== Historic plaque ==
To mark the site, an Ontario provincial plaque was installed on the grounds of the Gananoque Power Company.

On September 21, 1812, during the War of 1812, a United States force of some 200 regulars and militia under Captain Benjamin Forsyth attacked Gananoque, Ontario. The village was an important forwarding point for supplies moving up the St. Lawrence River from Montreal to Kingston and was garrisoned by a detachment of the 2nd Leeds Militia under Colonel Joel Stone. After a spirited resistance, Colonel Stone withdrew his force comprising two subalterns and about forty soldiers, and the Americans seized the stores and burned the government depot. As a result of this raid, a blockhouse was begun in Gananoque the following month and completed in 1813.

— Raid on Gananoque plaque
