= William H. Puthuff =

American soldier and politician

Personal details
- Born: 1768 or 1769 Virginia
- Died: July 17, 1824 Detroit, Michigan

William Henry Puthuff (1768 or 1769 — July 17, 1824), also spelled Puthoff, was an American soldier, businessman, and politician who served in the War of 1812 and occupied a number of government positions in the Territory of Michigan. In his role as Indian agent at Michilimackinac, he engaged in a multi-year conflict with John Jacob Astor and his American Fur Company. He was a member of the First Michigan Territorial Council and died while attending its first session.

== Biography ==
William Henry Puthuff was born in 1768 or 1769 and is believed to be a native of Albemarle County, Virginia. He moved to Ohio at some point and served in the Ohio House of Representatives from 1806 to 1807, representing Washington, Gallia, Muskingum, and Athens counties alongside Levi Barber and Lewis Cass. He was serving as the clerk of the Ohio Supreme Court when, at the outbreak of the War of 1812, he enlisted as a volunteer in General William Hull's army at the age of 43. He was made a captain in the 26th Infantry Regiment on May 20, 1813, and in February 1814, was promoted to major in the 2nd Regiment of Riflemen.

By the end of the war, Puthuff was the military commander at Detroit, and took a strict approach to upholding order. In one March 1815 incident, he evicted the wife and children of a resident named Daniel Ames—who was away at the time—as provided for by military law as punishment for Ames illicitly providing whiskey to troops under Puthuff's command. He arrested Ames himself when he came to protest the eviction; Ames sued, and a court later fined Puthuff US$570 (equivalent to $13,130 in 2025), finding he overstepped his authority since the military rules were no longer in effect at the time.

=== Indian agency in Michilimackinac ===
With the return to peacetime, Puthuff was compelled to retire from the army, as there was no longer a position for him. He received an address by the citizens of Detroit expressing thanks for his conduct while in command of the city. Lewis Cass, by then governor of the Territory of Michigan, proposed to Alexander J. Dallas, the acting secretary of war, that a new Indian Agency be opened at Michilimackinac. Cass recommended Puthuff for the post, noting his meritorious service during the war and expressing sympathy for the fact that he could not return to his previous job. Puthuff accepted a temporary assignment on August 18, 1815, since Cass was not sure how long it would take for a permanent posting to be approved. He arrived there in late August and was confirmed permanently in December.

Puthuff was distrustful of British fur traders operating in the territory, believing them to be operating as agents of a British government in order "to restore and maintain their wonted influence over" the various Native American tribes among which they operated. Robert McDouall, the British commander in the area, had been holding councils with the Indians on Drummond Island, and Puthuff began organizing meetings of his own to counteract the British influence. Puthuff escalated tensions by twice threatening the arrest of Elizabeth Mitchell, the Ottawa wife of the British garrison's surgeon, once for allegedly trading in liquor without a license, and the second for allegedly stirring up resistance to America among the Ottawa. McDouall wrote that Puthuff "out Herods Herod", called the charges "puerile and absurd", and accused Puthuff and the Americans of other aggravations against the British; Puthuff denied the accusations in a message to Governor Cass.

Puthuff also began confiscating furs under the rationale that no traders in Michilimackinac had paid legal duties, ignoring their protests that it would have been impossible to pay since the British had been in control of the area at the time; he later allowed the traders to post bond in exchange for the return of the merchandise. A law passed April 29, 1816, then denied licenses to any foreigners operating in the area without the express permission of the president of the United States. John Jacob Astor sent a letter revealing he intended to ask President James Monroe for a blanket license, causing Puthuff to warn Cass that "incalculable evil will assuredly grow" if Astor's request resulted in licenses being distributed to British subjects. Puthuff resumed confiscating furs after a letter from the War Department delegated the president's licensing power to Cass and the Indian agents themselves, this time despite the trappers' protests that they couldn't possibly have known of the new law since they were in the wilderness when it was passed.

Astor's representative Ramsay Crooks arrived with a letter of his own from the War Department, instructing Puthuff to aid him. Puthuff again resisted blanket licenses, and offered only to license traders who had not committed acts of aggression against American. Crooks objected that that would have excluded most of the British traders in the area due to their service in the British army; the two agreed to have Crooks sail to Detroit for Governor Cass to resolve their disagreement. Cass sided with Crooks, instructing Puthuff to issue licenses to anyone whose character was not objectionable, and Puthuff, after some initial objections to certain individuals, eventually complied. In August 1816 he decided to increase the previous $5 processing fee for licenses to $50, which fees he kept for himself. With this motivation, he began issuing licenses more liberally and netted an additional US$2,000 (equivalent to $37,941 in 2025) in addition to his $1200 yearly salary.

Crooks and Astor's opinion of Puthuff declined further in 1817 when Puthuff first declined to prosecute rival traders who were openly flouting the ban on bringing liquor into the area and then approved a rival British trader's license despite his clearly fraudulent scheme to comply with new rules from Cass that licenses should be given to anyone doing business with American companies. Crooks and Robert Stuart, a manager in Astor's American Fur Company, wrote a letter to Astor laying out their problems with Puthuff and suggesting he be fired. Astor, in turn, left the letter with Secretary of War John C. Calhoun. Calhoun forwarded the complaints to Cass, but then fired Puthuff before Cass had a chance to receive Puthuff's reply. Cass protested, but Puthuff was offered only the choice to stay until his replacement arrived or leave immediately for Washington to find a new post. Puthuff chose to stay and, after his first replacement backed out, applied for reinstatement; his appeal was denied, and a replacement finally arrived in June 1819.

=== Later years ===
After his ouster as Indian agent, Puthuff ran a store in Michilimackinac. He served as president of the village from 1817 to 1821 and again in 1823, and was chief justice of the county court in 1818. Puthuff was appointed as a trustee of the University of Michigan in 1821. He was one of the top 18 vote-earners in a general election held in 1823 to choose nominees for the new Michigan Territorial Council, which was set to replace the previous system where legislative duties were carried out by the governor and judges of the Territory of Michigan. The 18 names were sent to President Monroe, who selected Puthuff as one of the nine members of the council.

The inaugural session of the First Michigan Territorial Council began in Detroit on June 7, 1824, with Puthuff present. He died while the council was still in session, around 9 a.m. on July 17, 1824. The council recommended as his replacement Joseph Miller, who was nominated by Monroe on December 16 and confirmed by the Senate on December 21.

== Notes ==
Political offices
New creation	Member (at large) of Michigan Territorial Council; June 7, 1824 — July 17, 1824 (died in office)	Succeeded by Joseph Miller
