= Glengarry Light Infantry =

- Active: February 1812 - 18 May 1815
- Country: Upper Canada
- Allegiance: United Kingdom of Great Britain and Ireland
- Branch: British Army
- Type: Light Infantry
- Size: Battalion
- Engagements: War of 1812: First Battle of Ogdensburg; Second Battle of Ogdensburg; Battle of York; Battle of Fort George; Battle of Lundy's Lane

Commanders
- Notable commanders: Edward Baynes; George MacDonnell; Robert McDouall

The Glengarry Light Infantry Fencibles were a light infantry unit, raised chiefly in the Glengarry District of Upper Canada shortly before the outbreak of the Anglo-American War of 1812. The unit fought throughout the war, and was disbanded shortly afterwards.

== Formation ==
It was proposed to form a unit of fencibles in the Glengarry district in Upper Canada as early as 1807. Many of the inhabitants of the district were Catholic emigrants from Glengarry, Scotland, and many had served in the Glengarry Fencibles, which had been raised in 1794 and disbanded in 1802 shortly after the Treaty of Amiens had been signed, ending the war between Britain and Republican France. During that time they had performed garrison duties in the Channel Islands and fought in the Irish rebellion of 1798. The fencible units raised in Canada would serve under the same terms of enlistment as regular soldiers but would be obliged to serve in North America only.

The Secretary of State for War and the Colonies rejected the scheme but in 1808, Governor General Sir James Craig issued a letter of service authorising the raising of the unit on his own authority. He was forced to withdraw it a month later as the unit's officers could not raise the promised number of men in time.

In 1812 however, as war with the United States appeared to be inevitable, Craig's replacement as Governor General, Sir George Prevost, again decided to raise the unit on his own responsibility. He appointed Captain George MacDonnell of the 8th (King's) Regiment to raise the "Glengarry levy", which initially was to have a strength of 376 other ranks. Recruits came from districts as far away as Nova Scotia, New Brunswick and Prince Edward Island. Most were of Scottish origins or extraction. French-speakers or recent immigrants from the United States were not allowed to join the unit. (Many of the French-speakers served instead in the Canadian Regiment of Fencible Infantry.) Recruits were granted a bounty of four guineas on enlistment, and were promised 100 acres of land after the war.

Partly through the efforts of the unit's chaplain, Alexander Macdonell, the unit grew during formation to a strength of 600. Prevost raised the corps' status to that of a regiment and renamed it the Glengarry Light Infantry Fencibles. He appointed his adjutant-general, Edward Baynes, as the regiment's Colonel. Major Francis Battersby, who like Captain George MacDonnell was from the 8th (King's) Regiment, was promoted to be the unit's lieutenant colonel. MacDonnell was promoted to be the unit's major.

== Service during the War of 1812 ==
The unit first gathered for training at Trois-Rivières during the first half of 1812. During the later months of the year, the unit's companies were deployed to various locations in Upper Canada, to act as a nucleus around which the local militia could form in a crisis. On 3 October, two companies were stationed at Prescott on the Saint Lawrence River and were involved in a failed attack on Ogdensburg on the American side of the river. The attack was called off when American artillery ranged in on the boats carrying the attackers.

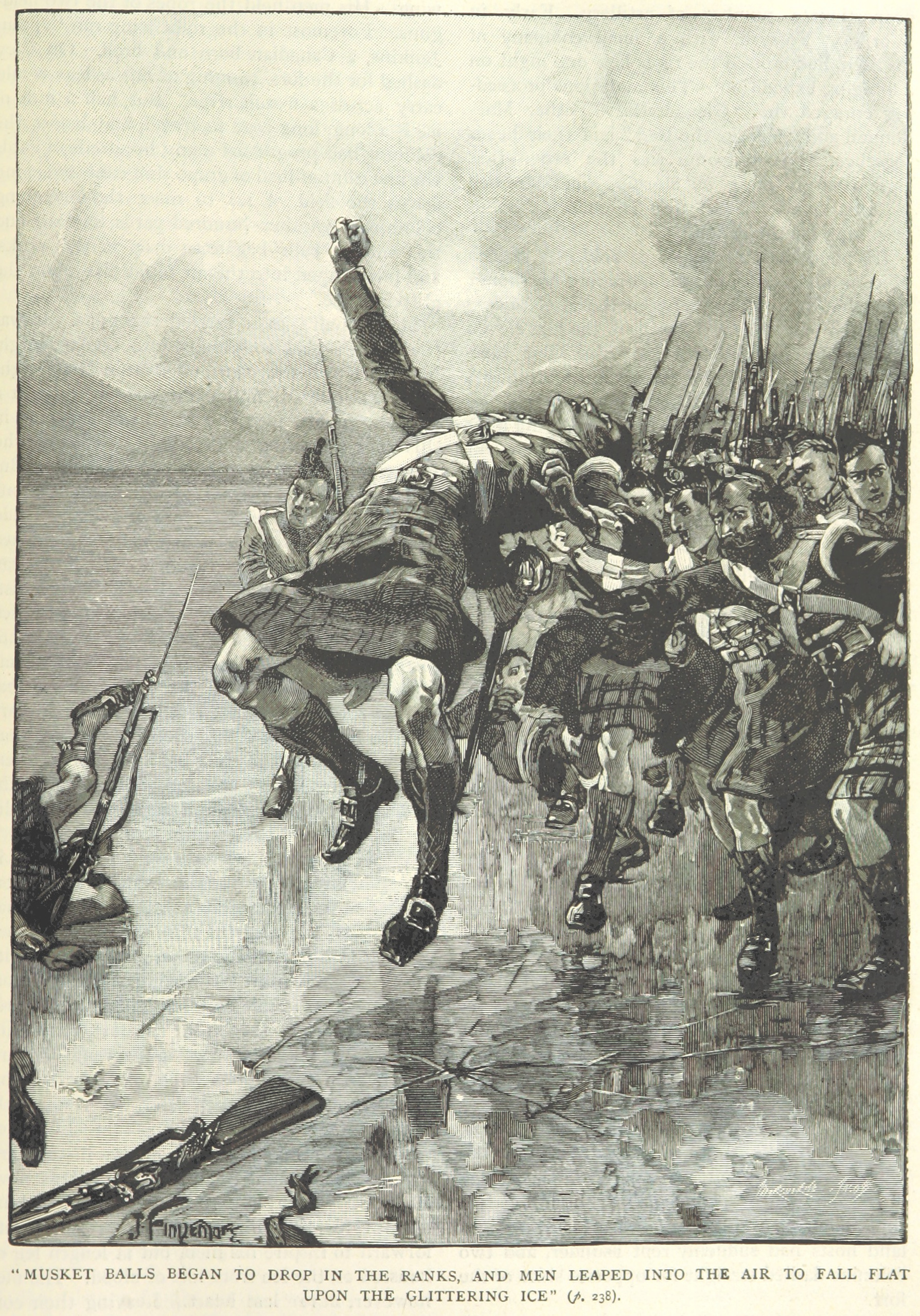
The Glengarrys charge across the Saint Lawrence (Illustration from a British book). Note: the highlander uniform is inaccurate.

On 22 February 1813, George MacDonnell (who had been promoted to lieutenant colonel and appointed to command the garrison at Prescott) mounted another, successful, attack across the frozen river. In the Battle of Ogdensburg, a company of the Glengarry Light Infantry and some militia made a frontal attack, while the main body of Macdonell's force turned the American right flank. The Reverend Alexander Macdonell was conspicuous in urging on the Glengarry soldiers and militia in their advance.

A company was present at the Battle of York but was able to play little part, as they were misdirected by the commander of the Upper Canadian militia. Another company suffered severe losses at the Battle of Fort George, trying to prevent American troops landing on the lake shore to outflank the fort. Yet another company was present at the Battle of Sackett's Harbor, where troops under Prevost and Baynes withdrew after failing to drive American troops from buildings and hastily constructed defences.

During the later part of 1813, the entire regiment was concentrated around Fort George, and was engaged for several weeks in harassing the American outposts around the captured fort.

The regiment was built back up to strength during the following winter. A company took part in the Raid on Fort Oswego in the spring of 1814. During the following summer the full regiment, together with the light infantry companies of four regular line regiments, formed a covering force on the Niagara Peninsula, commanded by Lieutenant Colonel Thomas Pearson. Later, on 25 July, the regiment formed part of a light infantry brigade under Pearson and played a major part in the Battle of Lundy's Lane. They harassed the left flank of the American army but suffered casualties when mistaken for Americans by other inexperienced British troops.

During the remainder of 1814, the regiment performed outpost duty during the unsuccessful Siege of Fort Erie, and a detachment was present at the Battle of Malcolm's Mills, the last action of the war on the Niagara Peninsula. The regiment was disbanded in 1816.

Two Irish-born soldiers of the regiment, John Henry and John Blueman, are notable for their alleged involvement in one of Toronto's most enduring historical mysteries – the 2 January 1815 murder of John Paul Radelmüller, keeper of the Gibraltar Point Lighthouse. Tradition holds that Radelmüller was killed by several soldiers from Fort York in a dispute over alcohol. Research by Eamonn O'Keeffe identified Blueman and Henry as the pair tried in March 1815 for the keeper's murder, although they were ultimately acquitted of the crime.

== Perpetuation ==
Today, the regiment's history and service is commemorated by the Canadian Army's Stormont, Dundas and Glengarry Highlanders, an Army Reserve regiment, headquartered in Cornwall, Ontario, which incorporates the title "GLENGARRY FENCIBLES" on its badge.

To commemorate the 200th anniversary of the War of 1812, the regiment was awarded the battle honours earned by the Glengarry Light Infantry:

- Defence of Canada – 1812–1815 – Défense du Canada
- Niagara

These are now among the 20 battle honours carried on the regimental colour of the Stormont, Dundas and Glengarry Highlanders.

== Uniform and equipment ==
When Craig first tried to form the unit he proposed that it wear the dress of Scottish highland regiments, with a Glengarry tartan plaid. Prevost intended the unit to be used as skirmishing light infantry and it adopted a dark green uniform with black facings as worn by the 95th Rifles . However, they were armed with the smoothbore Brown Bess muskets (New Land Pattern Light Infantry Model, with a backsight) rather than the Baker rifle. Also, unlike the 95th Rifles, the Glengarry Light Infantry were granted colours.

The regimental badge, worn on the front of the shako, was a strung bugle on which the letters "G L I" were superimposed, in white metal, the caps had green plumes, cords, and cockades. The crossbelt plate featured a thistle surrounded by the words "Glengarry Light Infantry."

Officers' uniforms consisted of a dark green dolman and pantaloons, with a crimson sash. They also wore a black shoulder belt, with a silver whistle and chain. Their shako badge was of the same design as that for other ranks, but was of silver. They may also have had a dark green pelisse, with black cords and black fur trim.

== Notable members ==
- Captian James FitzGibbon
- Lieutenant James Buchanan Macaulay
- Lieutenant Roderick Matheson
- Chaplain Alexander Macdonell
- Chaplain Rémi Gaulin

== See also ==
- Canadian units of the War of 1812

== Sources ==
- Barnes, RM, The Uniforms and History of the Scottish Regiments, London, Sphere Books Limited, 1972.
- Browne, James (1854). history of the Highlands and of the Highland clans: with an extensive selection from the hitherto inedited Stuart papers. Vol. 4. A. Fullarton and Co. pp. 378–381.
- Hitsman, J. Mackay (1999). The Incredible War of 1812. University of Toronto Press. ISBN 1-896941-13-3.
- Johnston, Winston (1998). The Glengarry Light Infantry, 1812–1816. Charlottetown, Prince Edward Island: Benson Publishing. ISBN 0-9730501-0-1.
- Chartrand, Rene; Embleton Gerry (1998). British Forces in North America 1793–1815. Osprey. ISBN 1-85532-741-4.
- O'Keeffe, Eamonn "New Light on Toronto's Oldest Cold Case: The 1815 Murder of John Paul Radelmüller", The Fife and Drum (December 2015), p. 3.
- Jonathan Philips, A Veteran of 1812: Jonathan Philips (Belleville, ON: Chronicle Office, 1868). 7
