= Edward Baynes =

British Army officer

Major-General Edward Baynes
- Born: 1768
- Died: 1829 (aged 60–61); Sidmouth
- Military career
- Branch: British Army
- Service years: 1783–1829
- Rank: Major-General
- Units: Nova Scotia Fencibles; Glengarry Light Infantry
- Conflicts: Second Battle of Sacket's Harbor; Battle of Plattsburgh

Edward Baynes (1768–1829) was an officer in the British Army. He served, mainly in staff roles, during the French Revolutionary Wars and Napoleonic Wars. However, he is best known for serving as one of the principal staff officers in British North America during the War of 1812 between Britain and the United States of America.

== Early career ==
He entered the army as an Ensign in 1783. During his early military career, he served mainly in the West Indies, including a spell as commander of a detachment of troops serving as marines aboard a frigate. He was promoted to lieutenant in 1790.

== Craig's aide-de-camp ==
Between 1794 and 1806 he served as aide-de-camp to Lieutenant General Sir James Craig, whose duties as military commander and colonial administrator took him to the Cape of Good Hope, Bengal, the East Indies, Gibraltar, Malta, Naples and Sicily. Baynes was promoted to the substantive rank of captain in 1795, to brevet major in 1796, to the substantive rank of major in 1800 and to brevet lieutenant colonel in 1802.

Baynes returned briefly to England in 1806. In August, he was appointed adjutant general to the forces in British North America. He was also appointed commanding officer of the Nova Scotia Fencibles. As adjutant general, Baynes was once more associated with General Sir James Craig, who was governor general until 1811.

== War of 1812 ==
Baynes was promoted to brevet colonel in 1811. As war with the United States threatened, he was appointed commander of the Glengarry Light Infantry, a new unit being raised on the authority of Sir George Prevost, Craig's replacement as governor general. Baynes exerted himself to recruit men to the new unit and to clothe and equip them. He wrote to Prevost on 20 May 1812, "...I have purchased all the green cloth in this place (Quebec) and have commissioned a sufficient quantity to equip the regiment to render it efficient for immediate service. I have, of course, subjected myself to many bad debts. If I am not appointed colonel, I am half ruined." Baynes was indeed appointed as the new regiment's colonel, though he did not lead it in the field.

Before and during the War of 1812, Baynes was responsible for communicating Prevost's strategy and orders to the commanders in the field. In July 1812, Prevost was notified that the British Government had revoked some of the orders in council which the Americans had cited as one of the causes of the war. Baynes went to Albany, New York, under a flag of truce to negotiate an armistice with Major General Henry Dearborn, commanding the United States' armies in the north. Dearborn agreed to local armistices while the United States government considered Prevost's approach. However, the government were in no mood to negotiate and fighting resumed.

During a visit to Kingston in Upper Canada in May 1813, Prevost and Commodore Sir James Lucas Yeo, commanding the British naval units on Lake Ontario, became aware that there was an opportunity to capture and destroy Sackets Harbor, New York. The American ships and Dearborn's army were based there, but both were absent at the western end of the lake. The available British troops were hastily embarked aboard Yeo's squadron. On 26 July, light winds and a scare caused by the sighting of unknown sails, which might have been the American squadron returning, caused the landing to be postponed. When it resumed on 28 July, Prevost delegated command of the troops to Baynes. The British troops successfully landed near Sackets Harbor and put American militia and volunteers to flight, but were unable to dislodge American regulars from buildings at the edge of the town and dockyards. Baynes recommended to Prevost that they withdraw. Prevost concurred, but the repulse damaged his and Baynes's reputations.

On 1 May 1814, Baynes was once again sent to negotiate an armistice as an extension of a prisoner exchange. At Champlain, New York, Brigadier General William Henry Winder claimed to have no authority to agree to any pact, and the British government subsequently disavowed the negotiations.

Large numbers of British troops were arriving in Canada. In June, Prevost secured Baynes's promotion to major general. This was resented by many of the recently arrived British commanders, who had seen far more fighting in the Peninsular War than Baynes had experienced during his career. Baynes was Adjutant General of the division which Prevost led in an invasion of New York State in September 1814. The British turned back after their ships were defeated in the Battle of Lake Champlain, making it impossible for the British to secure their lines of communication. Most of the British commanders considered that Prevost and his staff (including Baynes) had planned and executed the operation badly.

== Later life ==
After the War of 1812 ended, Baynes returned to England in 1816. He was largely unknown in the British Army, which had large numbers of veteran officers of the Peninsular War, and remained on half pay until his death, in Sidmouth, in 1829.

== Sources ==
- Hitsman, J. Mackay; Graves, Donald E. (1999). The Incredible War of 1812. Toronto: Robin Brass Studio. ISBN 1-896941-13-3.
