= O. P. Q. Letters =

Pair of anonymous letters from 1834

The "O. P. Q. Letters" were a pair of anonymous letters (dated 28 January and 7 February 1834) which were meant to incite the people of Texas to insurrection against Mexico. The grounds for insurrection were the arrest and imprisonment of Stephen F. Austin. The letters received their name because both were signed "O. P. Q."

== Origins ==
Although the letters were anonymous, their source is known: both were written by Anthony Butler, who was at the time the American minister to Mexico.

Butler was attempting to effect the purchase of Texas by the United States, and felt that rebellion might persuade Mexico to sell. The first of the two, addressed to "Don B.T.A", was sent to Branch Tanner Archer; whether or not the second was meant for the same address is unknown. They characterized the arrest of Austin as cowardly, and claimed it was done by "an ignorant, fanatical and arrogant race." In addition, the forthcoming inspection trip to be made by Colonel Juan Altamonte was called no more than a cynical attempt to please white Texan settlers.

Both letters soon were copied, and these copies were given to Colonel Altamonte in the summer of 1834, during his trip. Both the originals and these copies have since been lost. For his part, Altamonte forwarded translations of the letters to the Mexican government.

== Effects ==
Their tone and the worsening of Texas politics notwithstanding, apparently the letters had little effect. Many leading colonists distrusted Butler; furthermore, Austin had himself written letters urging the settlers to remain calm. Altamonte was initially skeptical of the possibility that Butler had been involved in sending the letters; once he was convinced, he began suspecting the United States government as well. Consequently, in July the colonel wrote a letter to the secretary of foreign relations in Mexico City recommending that Butler's recall be requested. But the Mexican authorities did nothing, and Butler was not recalled until the following year, and then only because President Andrew Jackson was displeased with his work.
