= 2nd Regiment of Riflemen =

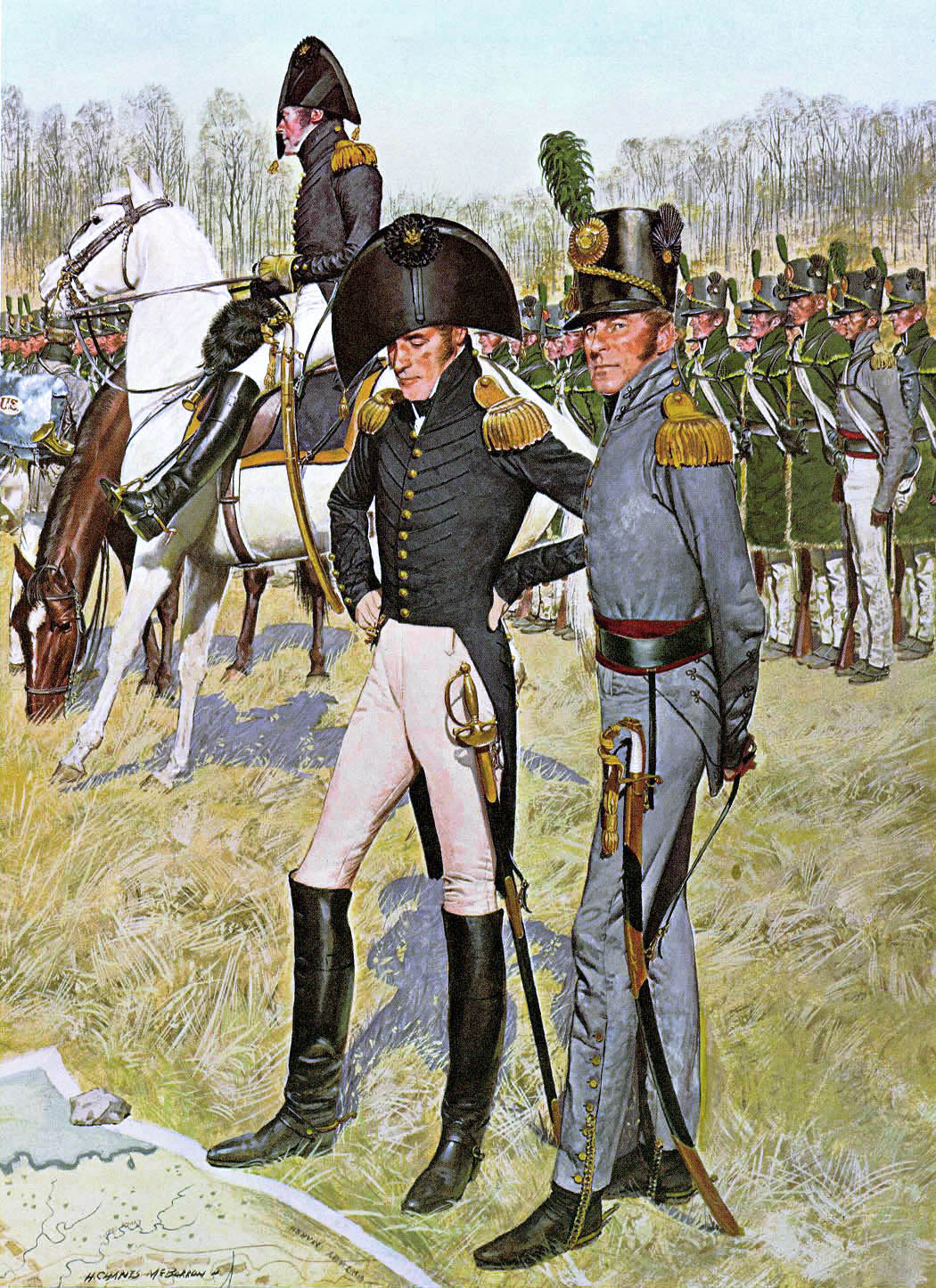
- Riflemen officer in gray (foreground) and troops in green smocks (background)
- Active: 1814 — 1815
- Disbanded: March 3, 1815
- Country: United States
- Branch: United States Army
- Type: Riflemen
- Role: Light infantry
- Size: Regiment
- Weapons: U.S. Model 1814 scalping knife tomahawk,
- Campaigns: War of 1812

Commanders
- Sole Commander: Anthony Butler

The 2nd Regiment of Riflemen was a unit of the U.S. Army in the early nineteenth century. It was first activated in 1814 during the War of 1812 when the War Department created three additional rifle regiments based on the success of the Regiment of Riflemen. The regiment was deactivated in May 1815.

== Organization ==
The regiment was activated on February 10, 1814. It was consolidated with the other regiments of riflemen on May 17, 1815.

== Service ==
The regiment spent virtually its entire life on garrison duty in Detroit, Michigan Territory and Fort Malden, Upper Canada after Detroit had been abandoned by the British following the Battle of Lake Erie. Regimental depots were placed in Chillicothe, Ohio; Nashville, Tennessee, and Lexington, Kentucky. The riflemen never gained full strength, in part because recruiters for other commands misrepresented themselves as being recruiters for the riflemen. The regiment suffered continuing shortages of uniforms and equipment. The riflemen did ensure that trade with Native Americans was fair and that civil order was maintained.
