= Thomas Adams Smith =

United States Army general

Brigadier General Thomas Adams Smith
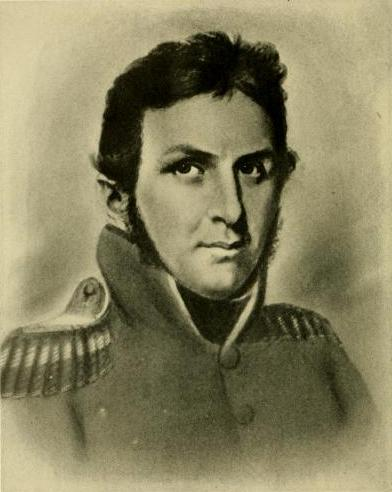
- Gen. Thomas A. Smith
- Born: August 12, 1781; Piscataway, Essex County, Virginia
- Died: June 25, 1844 (aged 62); Experiment Farm, Saline County, Missouri
- Burial place: Memorial Presbyterian Church Cemetery, Napton, Saline County, Missouri; 39.04747°N 93.10258°W
- Spouse: Cynthia Berry White Smith
- Relatives: Dr. Crawford E. Smith, son; Cynthia White Smith Berkeley, daughter; Six other children
- Military career
- Allegiance: United States
- Branch: United States Army
- Service years: 1803 — 1818
- Rank: Brigadier General
- Commands: Regiment of Riflemen; Ninth Military District

Thomas Adams Smith was an American military officer and, later, a government official, in the first half of the 19th century. He commanded troops in the "Patriot War" in Spanish East Florida. He commanded the Regiment of Riflemen and then the Ninth Military Department. He was a slave owner. The city of Fort Smith, Arkansas, is named for Smith, although he never went to its location.

== Early life ==
Thomas Adams Smith was born on August 12, 1781, in Piscataway, Essex County, Virginia. He was the fifth of seven children of Francis and Lucy Wilkinson Smith. At some point prior to entering the U.S. Army, Smith moved to Georgia.

== Military career ==
Smith was commissioned as a second lieutenant of artillery on December 15, 1803, and promoted to first lieutenant on December 31, 1805. In October 1806, General James Wilkinson used Smith, then serving as Wilkinson's aide, as a courier to transport letters relating to the Burr conspiracy to President Thomas Jefferson.

Smith enjoyed the support of Senator William H. Crawford (whose present-day namesake Crawford County, Arkansas, lies across the Arkansas River from its neighbor Fort Smith) and Congressman George M. Troup, both of Georgia. It is unclear whether patronage was involved but Smith, now an experienced officer, was promoted to captain in the Regiment of Riflemen on May 3, 1808. When Lieutenant Colonel William Duane proved unequal to the task of being second in command of the Regiment of Riflemen, Smith was promoted to lieutenant colonel on July 31, 1810, and replaced Duane; he was promoted over John Fuller, the major in the regiment, who left the Army.

A group of Georgians, calling themselves "Patriots", crossed into Spanish East Florida and, on March 17, 1812, captured Amelia Island from the Spanish garrison. The Patriots then "ceded" Amelia Island and the surrounding area to the United States. On April 12, 1812, Smith led two companies of riflemen who occupied Fort Mose, Spanish East Florida as part of the Patriot War of East Florida. The riflemen received little support from the US Government or the Patriots. Smith attempted a siege of St. Augustine, Florida, but his supply lines were not secure and the Spanish garrison of Castillo de San Marcos threatened his command. The Spanish counterattacked Fort Mose and Smith retreated to an encampment further from St. Augustine, Florida. On May 16, 1812, the Spanish set fire to Fort Mose to prevent its reoccupation. All US troops were withdrawn from East Florida by May 1813. Troops retreated to Point Petre, Georgia, under the leadership of Captain Abraham A. Massias.

On July 6, 1812, Colonel Alexander Smyth left the regiment to become Inspector General of the Army and Smith was promoted to colonel and assumed command of the regiment.

During the War of 1812, elements of the Regiment of Riflemen were allocated to different commands and rarely fought together. On January 24, 1814, Smith was promoted to brigadier general. He relinquished command to the riflemen to George W. Sevier and assumed command of a light infantry brigade near Plattsburgh, New York. In September 1814, Smith's brigade, including elements of the Regiment of Riflemen, proceeded to join forces operating near Niagara, New York. They failed to arrive before the campaign season ended in December. Smith was allowed to take leave in Knoxville, Tennessee. While he was on leave, the war ended.

Following the end of the War of 1812, the Army was reduced in size. Smith was retained but reverted, on May 17, 1815, to his earlier rank of colonel; however, he was concurrently brevetted as a brigadier general postdated to January 24, 1814, the date of his wartime promotion.

In July 1815, Smith was ordered to report to St. Louis, Missouri, and arrived on September 1, 1815. He resumed command of the Regiment of Riflemen.

During Smith's tenure, the Regiment of Riflemen founded Fort Armstrong, Rock Island, Illinois; Fort Crawford, Prairie du Chien, Wisconsin; Fort Howard, Green Bay, Wisconsin; and Fort Smith, Arkansas. The last was named after Thomas Smith and a community grew up around the fort. After a few years, the Army abandoned the installation, but the city of Fort Smith remained, and continued to grow. Throughout the twentieth century, it was the second-largest city in Arkansas.

Smith resigned from the Army on November 10, 1818.

== Later life ==
During the time Smith was assigned to Fort Bellefontaine, Missouri, legislation opened up new areas of Missouri for settlement and for the opening of a land officer in Franklin, Missouri. Smith wanted to be appointed as the receiver of the office because he wanted to establish a permanent residence for his wife and children as well as their inherited slaves. John O'Fallon, formerly a captain in the Regiment of Riflemen and now a prominent businessman in St. Louis successfully pleaded his case and Smith was appointed to the position. Later, he was able to acquire six or seven thousand acres of land, on which he established a farm he named "Experiment." In 1829, Smith resigned his position as receiver and moved with his family to the house he had built on the farm, becoming a full-time farmer. He never sought another public office.

Smith died on June 25, 1844, at Experiment Farm. (Heitman shows his date of death as December 1818.) The town of Smithton Company was named after him.
