= Odelltown, Quebec =

Coordinates: 45°2′7.8″N 73°23′26.3″W

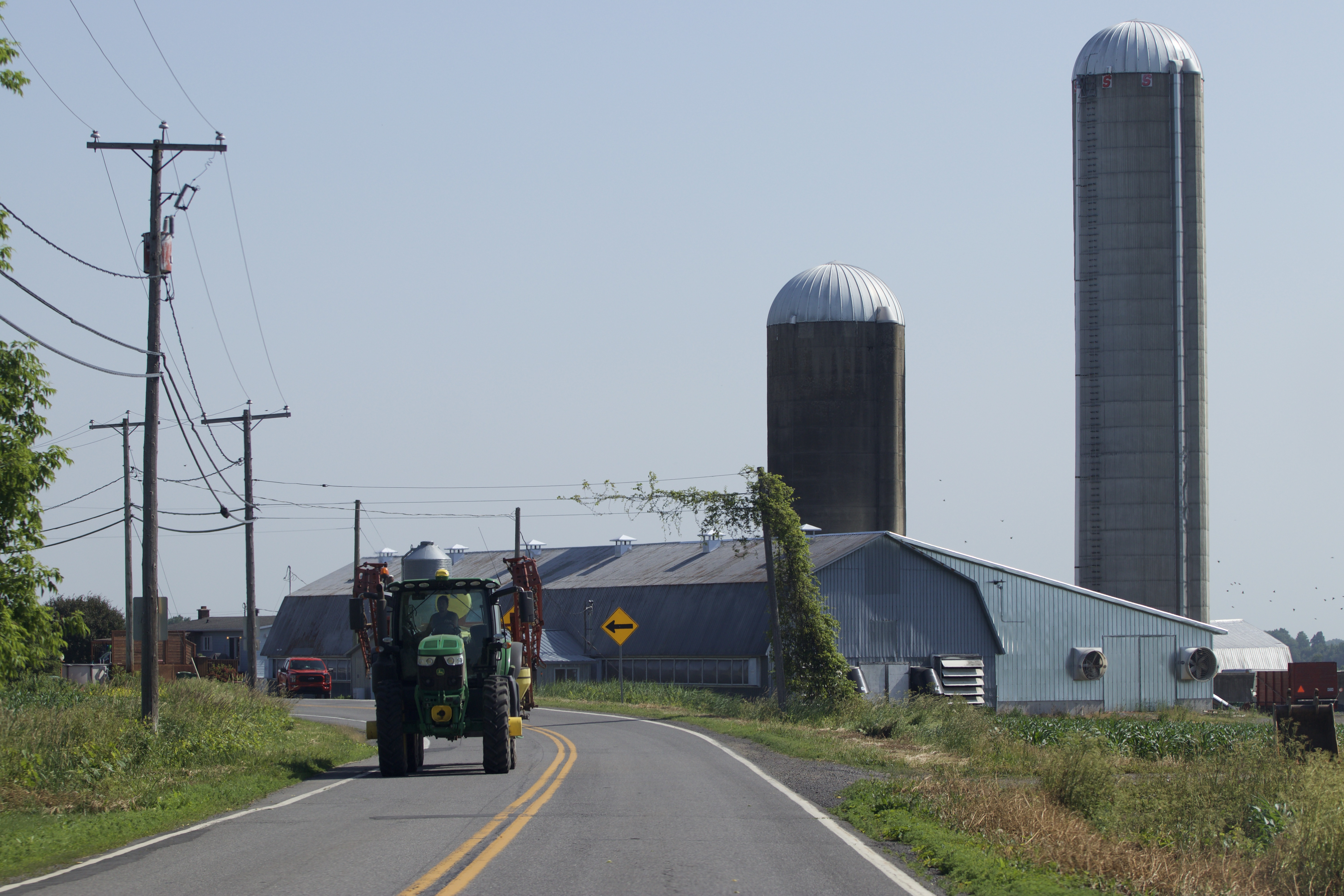
Farm scene in Odelltown, Quebec

Odelltown is a former town in southern Quebec, Canada located on Route 221, 4.7 km (2.9 mi) south of Lacolle, Quebec. The settlement was named after Joseph Odell, a United Empire Loyalist and Founder Pioneer of the Odell Family in Odelltown, Province of Lower Canada (now Quebec, Canada). The hamlet has since been made part of Lacolle. The area was the scene of a battle on 28 June 1814 during the War of 1812 between American and British forces. It resulted in a British victory. Odelltown was also the scene of two engagements between rebels and loyalists during the Lower Canada Rebellion between 7 November 1838 and 9 November 1838. Both engagements resulted in loyalist victories.

== Odell family ==
Joseph Odell Sr. and his wife, Martha Manning, settled in this area together with six of their seven sons. Joseph Odell Sr. later moved to the Sutton area. The stone house, built in 1801 by their third son, Joseph Odell Jr. (m. Sarah (Sally) Lewis) still stands to this day on the northeast side of 221 and Montée Guay just south along 221 from the Odelltown Methodist Church. There were several houses belonging to the sons of Joseph Odell Sr. built along this road right up to the Canadian/American Border. The Odelltown Methodist Church (1823) is now a heritage site. There is an annual service followed by a picnic the last Sunday of June, rain or shine.

=== John Odell ===
Joseph Odell Sr.'s eldest son John Odell Sr., who was married to Regina Eneah 'Enor' Schryver, lived in nearby Burtonville (no longer existing) and was a farmer and tavernkeeper. They had 10 children by the time John Odell died 29 December 1812 and he is buried in the Jackson Cemetery. Enor remarried Jacob Manning and had 8 more children. She and her children moved to the London, Ontario area where many of her descendants are today and where she is buried in the Old Wesleyan Methodist Churchyard, Brick Street, south of London - her stone says: "This stone was erected by Albert S. Odell to the memory of his mother, Mrs. Enor Manning, who died 31 March 1844, aged 84 years". John Odell Sr., died after falling ill while serving during the 1812 War by passing letters between his brother, Capt. Joseph Odell Jr. and L. Lalane, one of His Majesty's soldiers, and his death was reported by his brother, Capt. Joseph Odell Jr. to L. Lalane by letter dated 31 December 1812 requesting assistance for Enor and their children. The family had had to flee from their home in the dead of winter due to it being burned under orders of His Majesty's Troops to "burn and destroy" all in their path as they retreated from the American Troops. From documentation and descriptions in letters, it is believed that Burtonville was located along Odelltown Road just about a mile south-west of where Odelltown is located near the road from Montreal to Champlain.

=== Joshua Odell ===
Joshua Odell (Joseph and Martha's 2nd son), married Mariah (Mary) Ostrum and many of their direct descendants are still living in the area. Both Joshua and Mariah are buried in Jackson Cemetery.

=== Joseph Odell Jr. ===
Joseph Odell Jr. (Joseph and Martha's 3rd son), the builder of the 1801 stone house, was an ardent mason, held civil office (he was appointed as Justice of the Peace for the District of Montreal on 22 April 1809 and as such could try cases under Statute 48 Geo 3rd Chapter 15 in Beaujeu and De Lery as of 25 April 1809). Prior to coming to Canada, Joseph, his father and brothers were in the American War of 1776 under Captain Lemuel Conklin's Company in Colonel Morris Graham's Fourth Duchess Regiment. In Canada, Joseph Odell Jr was Captain of the 1st Battalion of Townships Militia during the War of 1812. Joseph Odell Jr. and his wife Sally are buried in the Jackson Cemetery.

=== Joshua J. Odell ===
Joseph Odell Jr.'s eldest son, Joshua J. Odell, settled in Hemmingford, Quebec. Joshua J. Odell, together with some cousins and others had gone to the London, Ontario area and also bought land and some of their descendants settled in that area. Joshua J. Odell and his wife, Mary Robertson, are buried in the Odell/MacKay Cemetery on Lavalee Road in Hemmingford. The house they built about 1824 still stands on the north-west corner of Rte 219 and Lavallee Road just north of the town of Hemmingford. 45.067869,-73.583678

== Sources ==
The English Settlers of Lacolle, Quebec

Rootsweb South West Quebec

Odell Genealogy - United States and Canada (1635-1935) Compiled by Minnie A. Lewis Pool of Waverly, Iowa, Past State Historian Iowa. D.A.R.; Past State Registrar Iowa, D.F.P.A. - published 1935 by Emery A. Odell, Monroe, Wisconsin. Minnie was a direct descendant of Joseph Odell and Martha Manning through their daughter, Sarah Odell who married Joseph Lewis (Joseph Lewis was the brother of Joseph Odell Jr.'s wife, Sarah (Sally) Lewis).
