= Battle of Ogdensburg =

1813 battle of the War of 1812

Coordinates: 44°41.667′N 75°30.073′W

- Part of War of 1812
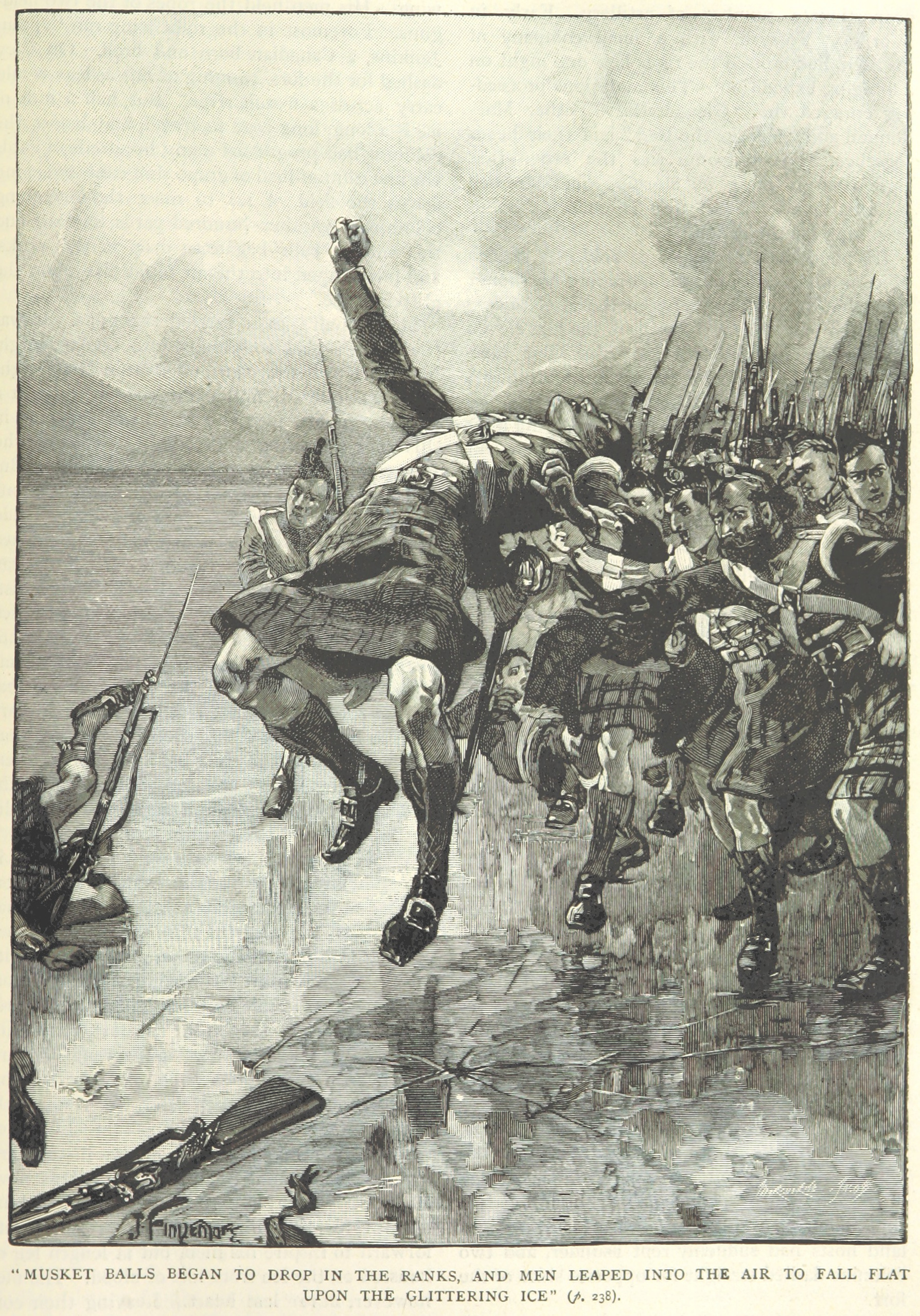
- The Glengarry Light Infantry attacks across the frozen river during the Battle of Ogdensburg.
Date	February 22, 1813
Location	Ogdensburg, New York
Result	British victory

Belligerents
United Kingdom; Upper Canada	United States

Commanders and leaders
George MacDonnell	Benjamin Forsyth

Strength
520	About 250

Casualties and losses
6 killed 44 wounded	20–26 killed 6 wounded 60–70 captured

The Battle of Ogdensburg was a battle of the War of 1812. The British gained a victory over the Americans and captured the village of Ogdensburg, New York. Although small in scale, it removed the American threat to British supply lines for the remainder of the war.

== Background ==
When the war broke out, a flourishing illicit trade was soon established between Ogdensburg and Prescott, Upper Canada (later to become the province of Canada West in 1841), on the Northern side of the Saint Lawrence River. This was checked early in October 1812 when the Americans reinforced the militia with some of the regular 1st U.S. Rifle Regiment under Major Benjamin Forsyth, who occupied a fort and barracks alongside the Oswegatchie River at the western edge of the town.

The British made an abortive attack on Ogdensburg with their own militia on October 4, which was quickly repulsed by the American forces, after which the militia dispersed. During the next few months, Forsyth's riflemen made several raids across the river, sniping at British troops and occasionally capturing boatloads of supplies on their way to Kingston, Ontario.

On February 21, 1813, Lieutenant General Sir George Prevost, the British Governor General of Canada, passed through Prescott on his way to review the situation in Upper Canada, accompanied by several detachments of reinforcements. He appointed local Lieutenant Colonel "Red George" MacDonell as commandant of British troops in Prescott and left him instructions that he was to attack Ogdensburg only if the Americans weakened their garrison.

The reinforcements, although there temporarily, allowed MacDonnell to improvise an attack against Ogdensburg. He planned for a company of the Glengarry Light Infantry, 70 militia and some light guns mounted on sleighs to make a frontal attack on the fort which housed Forsyth's riflemen. The main column, consisting of 120 men of the 8th (King's), 30 of the Royal Newfoundland Fencibles and 230 of the local militia flank companies, (Note: The militia flank companies were composed of volunteers who drilled every weekend rather than once or twice a year) would cross the river lower down and attack from the flank.

== Battle ==
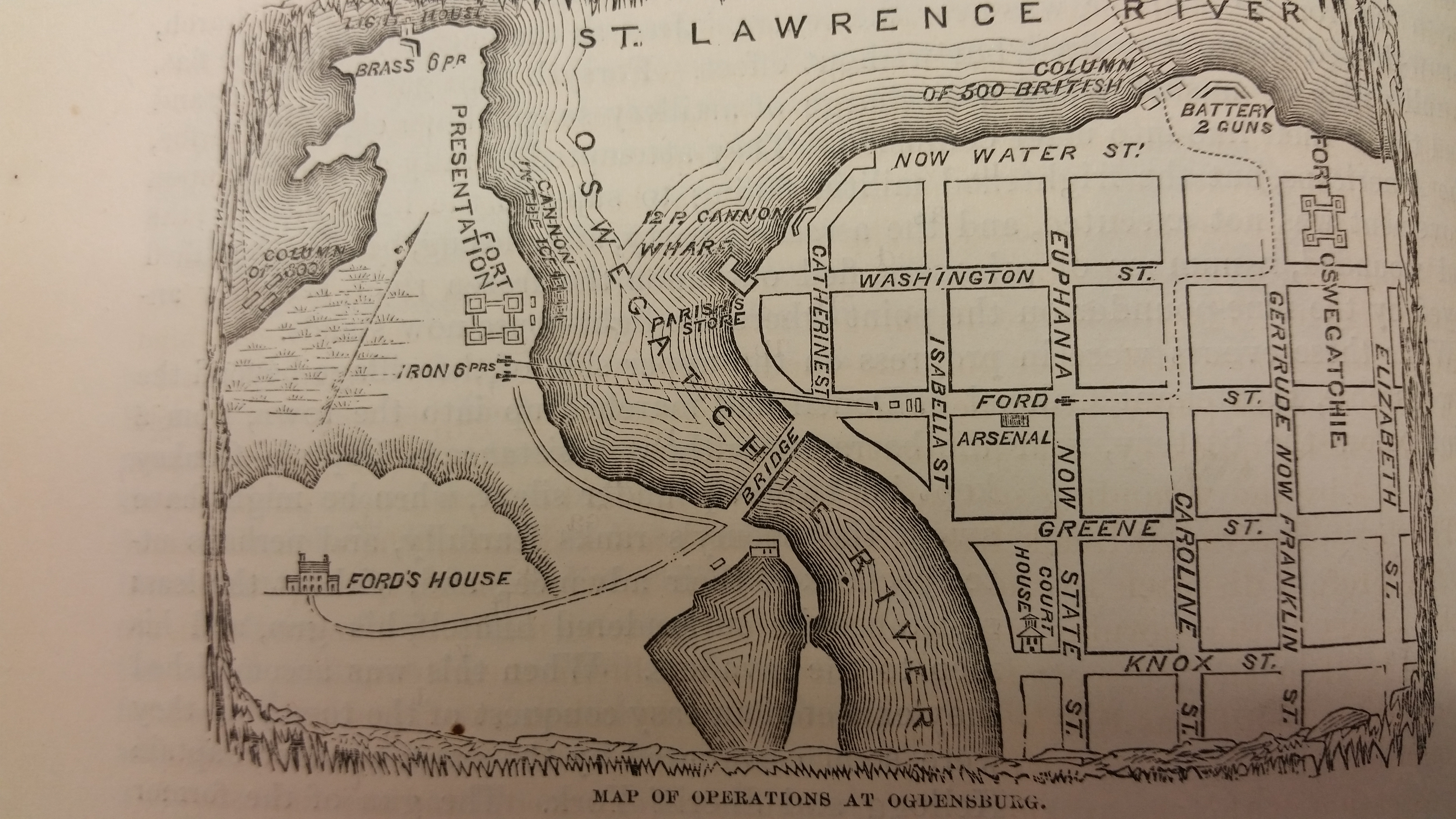
Map of the Battle of Ogdensburg.

The Americans were used to seeing British troops drilling on the frozen Saint Lawrence and were taken by surprise when they suddenly charged. The regimental Chaplain of the Glengarry Light Infantry, Alexander Macdonell, is reputed to have accompanied the attack, wielding a crucifix to encourage lagging soldiers. He was also believed to be supported by a Presbyterian minister, the Rev. John Bethune of Williamstown.

The American riflemen in the fort held out against the frontal attack, mainly because the British guns became stuck in snow drifts, and American artillery, under Adjutant Daniel W. Church of Colonel Benedict's regiment and Lieutenant Baird of Forsyth's company, fired on the British with mixed results. At the outskirts of the town, American militia bombarded the British force with their artillery. A British flank party maneuvered to the least guarded part of the ground and broke through the weak part of the defense. American militia who had been dislodged from their position fell back while conducting a harassing fire by shooting at the British from behind houses and trees. More British flankers maneuvered through the gap to strike the American militia’s main defense from behind. Soon, the British attacking from the front and rear overran the position. The remaining American militia ran farther into the village where some of them took cover in or behind houses while providing harassing fire against the British. The British overran them, leaving Forsyth’s position as the only remaining obstacle.

Benjamin Forsyth had placed his riflemen behind stone buildings as shelter. When the British came closer, Forsyth’s riflemen and artillery opened heavy fire causing a number of casualties to the British raiders. The British soon overran this position also and the Americans retreated. Some of the American militia surrendered or were captured, others fled to other towns or hid amongst the civilian population.

== Casualties ==
The British casualty return listed two British regulars, two men from the Glengarry Light Infantry, one man from the Dundas County Militia and one other militiaman killed; 12 British regulars, 12 of the Glengarry Light Infantry and 20 militiamen wounded, for a total of six killed and 44 wounded.

Lieutenant Colonel Macdonell reported that 20 Americans were killed and 70 captured, of whom many were wounded. An American account gave their loss as 26 killed and wounded and about 60 taken prisoner, a figure which suggests that only six of the wounded men escaped capture.

== Forces ==
British and Canadian militia forces involved at the battle included:

- Royal Newfoundland Regiment
- 8th (The King's) Regiment of Foot
- 1st Regiment of Dundas County Militia
- 1st Regiment of Grenville Militia
- 2nd Regiment of Grenville Militia
- 1st Regiment of Leeds Militia
- 1st Regiment of Stormont Militia
- Glengarry Light Infantry Fencibles (Captain John Jenkins)

== Aftermath ==
The British burned two American gunboats and two schooners frozen into the ice, and carried off sixteen artillery pieces and other military stores. There was some looting of private property, but some of the plundered goods were later returned. Some poorer citizens of Ogdensburg also helped themselves to the contents of looted stores.

The normally cautious Prevost amended MacDonell's despatch reporting the victory to make it appear that the attack had been carried out on, rather than against, his orders.

After the British withdrew, Major Forsyth requested 300 reinforcements to recapture Ogdensburg. The citizens objected, fearing that the town would become the target for frequent destructive raids and counter-raids. Forsyth and his surviving riflemen withdrew to Sacket's Harbor. The Americans did not re-garrison Ogdensburg and the British were able to purchase supplies from American merchants there for the remainder of the war. Prominent citizens of Ogdensburg frequently crossed the river to dine with British officers. The Ogdensburg area may have been populated by more Tories and Federalists than was previously thought.
