= George Macdonell (British Army officer) =

George Richard John Macdonell (15 August 1780 – 6 May 1870), commonly known as Red George, was an officer in the British Army who played a conspicuous part in the War of 1812.

== Biography ==
He was born at St. John's, Newfoundland, the son of John Macdonell (Leek), commandant of Fort Townshend and his wife Elizabeth Duguid. Returning with his family to England, he was commissioned an ensign in the 55th Foot in 1796, becoming a captain in the 8th (The King's) Regiment of Foot in 1805. Three years later, the 8th were posted to Nova Scotia, and subsequently to Quebec.

In addition to his regimental duties, Macdonell undertook several staff duties which made him familiar with many parts of Canada and its inhabitants. Shortly before the war with the United States broke out, the settlers of the Glengarry district, many of them discharged soldiers, petitioned the governor general, Sir George Prevost, to be re-embodied as a unit. Prevost appointed Macdonell as major in the unit, the Glengarry Light Infantry.

He was promoted to lieutenant colonel on 8 February 1813, and appointed to command the garrison at Prescott on the St. Lawrence River. Although Prevost cautioned him on 20 February to remain on the defensive, Macdonell launched an attack two days later using detachments of reinforcements which were passing through Prescott to bolster his militia. The resulting Battle of Ogdensburg largely cleared the Saint Lawrence for use as a British supply line for the rest of the war.

Macdonell was slightly wounded in the attack. He recovered to lead the ad hoc 1st Light Battalion, composed of flank companies from regular infantry units and Select Embodied Militia battalions. In October he was ordered to move to reinforce Lieutenant Colonel Charles de Salaberry's troops south of Montreal. He was effectively second-in-command to de Salaberry at the Battle of Chateauguay.

Later on, Macdonell used his experience as commander on the Prescott section of the Lawrence to recommend the use of the Rideau River as an alternate supply line should the Americans attempt to block the Saint Lawrence. However, he received no financial reward for his work, as the Colonial Office claimed there had been an earlier survey.

Macdonell returned to England in 1816, but saw no further active service. He became increasingly embittered and apparently unbalanced over what he saw as lack of recognition of his services, although he became a Companion of the Order of the Bath in 1817.
