= Peter Manley (politician) =

Canadian politician

Ontario MPP
- In office 1951–1963
- Preceded by: John Lawrence McDonald
- Succeeded by: Fernand Guindon
- Constituency: Stormont

Personal details
- Born: December 8, 1904 Berwick, Ontario
- Died: February 12, 1998 (aged 93)
- Party: Liberal
- Occupation: Farmer

Peter Thomas Manley (December 8, 1904 – February 12, 1998) was an Ontario dairy farmer and political figure. He represented Stormont in the Legislative Assembly of Ontario as a Liberal member from 1951 to 1963.

He was born in Berwick, Stormont County, Ontario in 1904.

== Local politics ==
Manley first entered politics at the municipal level, serving as a member of the Finch Township Council from 1933 to 1936.

A proud farmer, Manley is heavily involved in the farming community. He served as president of his local committee of the Ontario Plowman’s Association, and considered the leading role he played in planning and organization of the 1958 International Plowing Match held in Cryaler (the home community of his wife) one of the highlights of his life. He also supported 4-H Club by sponsoring the Manley Trophy, the top honours for Stormont Junior Farmer recipients.

== Provincial parliamentarian ==
In the 1951 provincial election, he stood for the Liberal Party was elected to the Legislative Assembly of Ontario, defeating incumbent Progressive Conservative member John Lawrence McDonald by nine points. He was re-elected twice, expanding his margin of victory in both 1955 and 1959 general elections, before facing defeat in the 1963 election.

=== Electoral history ===
Manley was initially hesitant to enter provincial politics as he consider politics only as a "part time hobby". The 1951 election that sent Manley to Queen's Park happened to be the election in which the Liberal fared the worst in the province's first 150 years. (Note: The Liberal fared worse in the general election held in 2018, the province 151st year.) The Ottawa Journal carried a story in 1958 reporting on how Peter Manley was the only Liberal to defeat an incumbent Conservative in the 1951 provincial election, with comments about how he balanced political life with the farm duties and the family. The cheerful tone of the story belies the bleak outlook confronted Manley. Despite a modest gain in vote share, the 1951 elections reduced the Liberal caucus to only eight members due to the collapsed of NDP votes. Five of the eight Liberals in the 24th Parliament of Ontario were returned from the party's rural Southwestern Ontario power base. Manley's only caucus colleague from Eastern Ontario was third-term member Aurele Chartrand, representing the Liberal stronghold Ottawa East. Despite being smaller and leaderless, the Liberal caucus regained official opposition status, opposing the Progressive Conservative Frost ministry backed by a 79-member-strong caucus.

The Liberals fared slightly better in 1955, winning three additional seats in the expanded 25th Parliament of Ontario. Manley was re-elected with an expanded 14-point margin of victory. His eastern colleague Chartrand went down to defeat however, one of the very rare instances of the Liberal failing to hold the eastern Ottawa seat. This left Manley as the only Liberal west of Wellington county. He was nonetheless selected by his colleagues (nine from Southwestern Ontario and the tenth from the northwestern district of Kenora) as chair of the Liberal caucus, a role he continued to play following the election of new party leader John Wintermeyer in 1958.

Under Wintermeyer, the Liberals gained another three points in the 1959 Ontario general election and its caucus doubled in size in the 26th Parliament of Ontario. Manley secured a stunning 25-point margin of victory locally in Stormont. While he remained the only Liberal from Eastern Ontario, the caucus expanded beyond its rural southwestern base, with a number of new members representing urban ridings.

In 1963, Manley faced a unique challenge caused by cascading effects of shifting federal political fortune. Former Glengarry MPP Osie Villeneuve left the legislature in 1957 and became a federal MP. He lost his federal seat in the 1962 federal election that reduced the Diefenbaker ministry to a minority, and sought a return to the legislature. Villeneuve's successor, the future cabinet minister Fernand Guindon, yielded the Glengarry seat back to him, and moved over the challenge Manley instead. Guindon had moved into the riding before the 1959 election. The competitive nature of the contest was evident from the repeat visit by the Liberal leader Wintermeyer. In a drastic reversal of fortune, Manley went down to defeat by nine points. He was not the only Liberals defeated however. Despite leading the party to modest seat gains again, Liberal leader Wintermeyer was defeated in his home riding.

Manley declined the Liberal nomination in the 1967 election.

=== Legislative work ===
Given his background, Manley focused his legislative work in areas most relevant to the agricultural sector. He served on the standing committee on agriculture and the standing committee on game and fish in all thirteen sessions of the 24th, 25th and 26th parliaments, and on the standing committee on conservation in every session of the 25th and 26th parliaments. He also served on the standing committee on municipal law in all thirteen sessions.

A key focus of advocacy for Manley was for a north-south highway connecting Cornwall and Ottawa. He joined the select committee on highway safety when it was first formed in 1954, and became a regular fixture of the committee once it became a standing committee in the 25th parliament. He was also a member of the select committee on toll roads in the final session of the 24th parliament, and the select committee on toll roads and highway financing formed in the 25th parliament. The fruit of his advocacy did not arrive until a few years after his departure from parliament, when the provincial government legally acquired jurisdiction of and designated King's Highway 138 in 1967.

=== Electoral record ===
1951 Ontario general election: Stormont
Party	Candidate	Votes	%	±%
Liberal	Peter Manley	9,383	50.32	▲11.85
Progressive Conservative	John Lawrence McDonald	7,703	41.31	▲1.35
Co-operative Commonwealth	Kenneth Weir	1,560	8.37	▼9.31
Total valid votes / eligible voters		18,646	-	26642
Turnout		18,903	70.95	▼1.05
Plurality		1,5680	9.01	
Liberal gain from Progressive Conservative		Swing		+5.21

1955 Ontario general election: Stormont
Party	Candidate	Votes	%	±%
Liberal	Peter Manley	10,577	55.51	▲17.17
Progressive Conservative	Ovila Larin	7,875	41.33	▼2.71
Ind	Melvin Rowat	602	3.16	new
Total valid votes / eligible voters		19,054	-	29,012
Turnout		19,322	66.60	▼4.35
Plurality		2,702	14.18	
Liberal hold		Swing		+2.58

1959 Ontario general election: Stormont
Party	Candidate	Votes	%	±%
Liberal	Peter Manley	12,109	62.63	▲7.12
Progressive Conservative	Michael Salhany	7,225	37.37	▼3.96
Total valid votes / eligible voters		19,334	-	31,100
Turnout		19,554	62.87	▼3.73
Plurality		4,884	25.26	
Liberal hold		Swing		+5.54

1963 Ontario general election: Stormont
Party	Candidate	Votes	%	±%
Progressive Conservative	Fernand Guindon	11,101	52.74	▲15.37
Liberal	Peter Manley	9,274	44.06	▼18.57
New Democratic	William Kilger	675	3.21	new
Total valid votes / eligible voters		21,050	-	30,697
Turnout		21,264	69.27	▲6.40
Plurality		1,827	8.67	
Conservative gain from Liberal		Swing		+16.97
