= Stormont (provincial electoral district) =

Former provincial electoral district in Ontario, Canada

Ontario electoral district

Defunct provincial electoral district
- Legislature: Legislative Assembly of Ontario
- District created: 1867
- District abolished: 1975
- First contested: 1867
- Last contested: 1971

Stormont was an electoral riding in Ontario, Canada. It was created in 1867 at the time of confederation and was abolished in 1973 before the 1975 election. The riding roughly corresponded to the territory of Stormont County.

== Boundaries ==
From 1867 to 1886, the town of Cornwall was served by the separate electoral district of Cornwall; in 1886, the districts were merged, and the combined district was named Cornwall and Stormont only in the 1886 election. Its name reverted to Stormont for the 1890 election, and was not changed again until the riding's dissolution in 1975.

In the electoral redistribution of 1975, Stormont was split between the new ridings of Cornwall and Stormont—Dundas and Glengarry.

== Members of Provincial Parliament ==
Stormont
Assembly	Years	Member	Party
1st	1867–1871	William Colquhoun	Conservative
2nd	1871–1872	William Colquhoun	Conservative
2nd	1872–1874	James Bethune	Liberal
3rd	1875–1879	James Bethune	Liberal
4th	1879–1883	Joseph Kerr	Conservative
5th	1883–1886	Joseph Kerr	Conservative
6th	1886–1890	William Mack	Liberal
7th	1890–1894	William Mack	Liberal
8th	1894–1898	John Bennett	Liberal
9th	1898–1902	John McLaughlin	Conservative
10th	1902–1904	William John McCart	Liberal
11th	1905–1908	George Kerr	Conservative
12th	1908–1911	William John McCart	Liberal
13th	1911–1914	John Colborne Milligan	Conservative
14th	1914–1919	Robert Austin Shearer	Conservative
15th	1919–1923	James William McLeod	Liberal
16th	1923–1926	John Colborne Milligan	Conservative
17th	1926–1929	Duncan Alexander McNaughton	Conservative
18th	1929–1934	Duncan Alexander McNaughton	Conservative
19th	1934–1937	Fergus Beck Brownridge	Liberal
20th	1937–1943	Fergus Beck Brownridge	Liberal
21st	1943–1945	John Lawrence McDonald	Progressive Conservative
22nd	1945–1948	William Alexander Murray	Liberal
23rd	1948–1951	John Lawrence McDonald	Progressive Conservative
24th	1951–1955	Peter Manley	Liberal
25th	1955–1959	Peter Manley	Liberal
26th	1959–1963	Peter Manley	Liberal
27th	1963–1967	Fernand Guindon	Progressive Conservative
28th	1967–1971	Fernand Guindon	Progressive Conservative
29th	1971–1974	Fernand Guindon	Progressive Conservative
29th	1974–1975	George Samis	New Democratic
Sourced from the Ontario Legislative Assembly
Redistributed into Stormont—Dundas and Glengarry and Cornwall ridings before the 1975 election

== Election results ==
Ontario provincial by-election, October 17, 1974 Resignation of Fernand Guindon to run federally
Party	Candidate	Votes	%	±%
New Democratic	George Samis	9,934	42.54	+15.27
Progressive Conservative	Guy Leger	7,230	30.96	–27.13
Liberal	Paul Rouleau	6,088	26.07	+11.43
Social Credit	Alcide Hamelin	100	0.43	–
Total valid votes		23,352	99.69	
Total rejected ballots		72	0.31	–0.25
Turnout		23,424	–	–
Eligible voters				
New Democratic gain from Progressive Conservative		Swing		+21.20
Source: Elections Ontario

1971 Ontario general election
Party	Candidate	Votes	%	±%
Progressive Conservative	Fernand Guindon	13,378	58.09	+0.46
New Democratic	George Samis	6,279	27.27	+14.78
Liberal	Maurice Lafontaine	3,372	14.64	–15.24
Total valid votes		23,029	99.44	
Total rejected ballots		129	0.56	–0.10
Turnout		23,158	68.46	+2.10
Eligible voters		33,827		
Progressive Conservative hold		Swing		–7.16
Source: Elections Ontario

1967 Ontario general election
Party	Candidate	Votes	%	±%
Progressive Conservative	Fernand Guindon	10,942	57.63	+4.89
Liberal	Clem D. Parisien	5,674	29.88	–14.17
New Democratic	Ed Denis	2,371	12.49	+9.28
Total valid votes		18,987	99.35	
Total rejected ballots		125	0.65	–0.35
Turnout		19,112	66.36	–2.91
Eligible voters		28,799		
Progressive Conservative hold		Swing		+9.53
Source: Elections Ontario

=== 1963 ===
1963 Ontario general election
Party	Candidate	Votes	%	±%
Progressive Conservative	Fernand Guindon	11,101	52.74	+15.37
Liberal	Peter Manley	9,274	44.06	–18.57
New Democratic	William B. Kilger	675	3.21	–
Total valid votes		21,050	98.99	
Total rejected ballots		214	1.01	–0.12
Turnout		21,264	69.27	+6.40
Eligible voters		30,697		
Progressive Conservative gain from Liberal		Swing		+16.97
Source: Elections Ontario

=== 1959 ===
1959 Ontario general election
Party	Candidate	Votes	%	±%
Liberal	Peter Manley	12,109	62.63	+7.12
Progressive Conservative	Michael Salhany	7,225	37.37	–3.96
Total valid votes		19,334	98.87	
Total rejected ballots		220	1.13	–0.26
Turnout		19,554	62.87	–3.73
Eligible voters		31,100		
Liberal hold		Swing		+5.54
Source: Elections Ontario

=== 1955 ===
1955 Ontario general election
Party	Candidate	Votes	%	±%
Liberal	Peter Manley	10,577	55.51	+5.19
Progressive Conservative	Ovila Larin	7,875	41.33	+0.02
Independent Social Credit	Melvin Andrew Rowat	602	3.16	–
Total valid votes		19,054	98.61	
Total rejected ballots		268	1.39	+0.07
Turnout		19,322	66.60	–4.32
Eligible voters		29,012		
Liberal hold		Swing		+2.59
Source: Elections Ontario

=== 1951 ===
1951 Ontario general election
Party	Candidate	Votes	%	±%
Liberal	Peter Manley	9,383	50.32	+11.85
Progressive Conservative	John Lawrence McDonald	7,703	41.31	+1.35
Co-operative Commonwealth	Kenneth Weir	1,560	8.37	–9.31
Total valid votes		18,646	98.69	
Total rejected ballots		248	1.31	–0.18
Turnout		18,894	70.92	–1.09
Eligible voters		26,642		
Liberal gain from Progressive Conservative		Swing		+5.25
Source: Elections Ontario

=== Pre-1948 ===
1948 Ontario general election
Party	Candidate	Votes	%	±%
Progressive Conservative	John Lawrence McDonald	6,729	39.96	+2.22
Liberal	William Alexander Murray	6,479	38.48	–10.95
Co-operative Commonwealth	Ralph McIntee	2,976	17.67	+8.22
Union of Electors	Albert Tessier	655	3.89	–
Total valid votes		16,839	98.51	
Total rejected ballots		255	1.49	–0.30
Turnout		17,094	72.01	+0.83
Eligible voters		23,740		
Progressive Conservative gain from Liberal		Swing		+6.59
Source: Elections Ontario

1945 Ontario general election
Party	Candidate	Votes	%	±%
Liberal	William Alexander Murray	8,701	49.43	+11.95
Progressive Conservative	John Lawrence McDonald	6,644	37.74	–4.70
Co-operative Commonwealth	Simeon J. MacDonald	1,664	9.45	–10.63
Labor–Progressive	Leonard D. Harries	594	3.37	–
Total valid votes		17,603	98.21	
Total rejected ballots		321	1.79	+0.57
Turnout		17,924	71.18	+6.45
Eligible voters		25,182		
Liberal gain from Progressive Conservative		Swing		+8.33
Source: Elections Ontario

1943 Ontario general election
Party	Candidate	Votes	%	±%
Progressive Conservative	John Lawrence McDonald	5,860	42.45	+6.78
Liberal	Fred Lefebvre	5,174	37.48	–26.86
Co-operative Commonwealth	Malcolm Upper	2,772	20.08	–
Total valid votes		13,806	98.78	
Total rejected ballots		171	1.22	+0.18
Turnout		13,977	64.72	–7.22
Eligible voters		21,595		
Progressive Conservative gain from Liberal		Swing		+16.82
Source: Elections Ontario

1937 Ontario general election
Party	Candidate	Votes	%	±%
Liberal	Fergus Beck Brownridge	10,409	64.33	+1.28
Conservative	Howard O. Hessell	5,771	35.67	–1.28
Total valid votes		16,180	98.96	
Total rejected ballots		170	1.04	+0.18
Turnout		16,350	71.94	–0.31
Eligible voters		22,727		
Liberal hold		Swing		+1.28
Source: Elections Ontario

1934 Ontario general election
Party	Candidate	Votes	%	±%
Liberal	Fergus Beck Brownridge	9,430	63.06	–
Conservative	Duncan Alexander McNaughton	5,525	36.94	–39.88
Total valid votes		14,955	99.14	
Total rejected ballots		130	0.86	+0.24
Turnout		15,085	72.25	+19.96
Eligible voters		20,880		
Liberal gain from Conservative		Swing		–
Source: Elections Ontario

1929 Ontario general election
Party	Candidate	Votes	%	±%
Conservative	Duncan Alexander McNaughton	6,546	76.82	+10.85
Independent Conservative	Adam C. Fetterly	1,975	23.18	–
Total valid votes		8,521	99.38	
Total rejected ballots		53	0.62	–0.01
Turnout		8,574	52.29	–14.69
Eligible voters		16,398		
Conservative hold		Swing		+5.43
Source: Elections Ontario

1926 Ontario general election
Party	Candidate	Votes	%	±%
Conservative	Duncan Alexander McNaughton	7,101	65.97	+21.93
Liberal	Charles C. Monroe	3,663	34.03	+2.62
Total valid votes		10,764	99.37	
Total rejected ballots		68	0.63	–0.27
Turnout		10,832	66.98	+10.85
Eligible voters		16,173		
Conservative hold		Swing		+9.65
Source: Elections Ontario

1923 Ontario general election
Party	Candidate	Votes	%	±%
Conservative	John Colborne Milligan	3,661	44.04	+16.62
Liberal	James William McLeod	2,611	31.41	–11.60
United Farmers	Nathan Copeland	2,041	24.55	–5.02
Total valid votes		8,313	99.11	
Total rejected ballots		75	0.89	–0.64
Turnout		8,388	56.13	–12.15
Eligible voters		14,944		
Conservative gain from Liberal		Swing		+10.82
Source: Elections Ontario

1919 Ontario general election
Party	Candidate	Votes	%	±%
Liberal	James William McLeod	4,284	43.01	–5.53
United Farmers	James McKillican	2,946	29.58	–
Conservative	Duncan Alexander McNaughton	2,731	27.42	–24.04
Total valid votes		9,961	98.47	
Total rejected ballots		155	1.53	+0.86
Turnout		10,116	68.28	–9.37
Eligible voters		14,816		
Liberal gain from Conservative		Swing		+9.26
Source: Elections Ontario

1914 Ontario general election
Party	Candidate	Votes	%	±%
Conservative	Robert Austin Shearer	2,436	51.46	–1.18
Liberal	James William McLeod	2,298	48.54	+1.18
Total valid votes		4,734	99.33	
Total rejected ballots		32	0.67	+0.09
Turnout		4,766	77.65	+14.20
Eligible voters		6,138		
Conservative hold		Swing		–1.18
Source: Elections Ontario

1911 Ontario general election
Party	Candidate	Votes	%	±%
Conservative	John Colborne Milligan	2,249	52.63	+2.72
Liberal	Ambrose Fitzgerald Mulhern	2,024	47.37	–2.72
Total valid votes		4,273	99.42	
Total rejected ballots		25	0.58	+0.11
Turnout		4,298	63.45	–7.52
Eligible voters		6,774		
Conservative gain from Liberal		Swing		+2.72
Source: Elections Ontario

1908 Ontario general election
Party	Candidate	Votes	%	±%
Liberal	William John McCart	2,327	50.09	+0.84
Conservative	John Colborne Milligan	2,319	49.91	–0.84
Total valid votes		4,646	99.53	
Total rejected ballots		22	0.47	–0.43
Turnout		4,668	70.96	–8.94
Eligible voters		6,578		
Liberal gain from Conservative		Swing		+0.84
Source: Elections Ontario

1905 Ontario general election
Party	Candidate	Votes	%	±%
Conservative	George Kerr	2,679	49.93	+3.61
Liberal	William John McCart	2,642	49.25	–4.43
Conservative	A. Stark	44	0.82	–45.50
Total valid votes		5,365	99.09	
Total rejected ballots		49	0.91	+0.62
Turnout		5,414	79.90	+4.50
Eligible voters		6,776		
Conservative gain from Liberal		Swing		+4.02
Source: Elections Ontario

1902 Ontario general election
Party	Candidate	Votes	%	±%
Liberal	William John McCart	2,817	53.68	+14.21
Conservative	John McLaughlin	2,431	46.32	+3.16
Total valid votes		5,248	99.72	
Total rejected ballots		15	0.29	–0.30
Turnout		5,263	75.40	+4.39
Eligible voters		6,980		
Liberal gain from Conservative		Swing		+5.53
Source: Elections Ontario

1898 Ontario general election
Party	Candidate	Votes	%	±%
Conservative	John McLaughlin	2,125	43.16	+26.71
Liberal	Ambrose Fitzgerald Mulhern	1,943	39.47	+2.95
Independent	John Bennett	855	17.37	–29.66
Total valid votes		4,923	99.41	
Total rejected ballots		29	0.59	+0.22
Turnout		4,952	71.01	+8.11
Eligible voters		6,974		
Conservative gain from Liberal-Patrons of Industry		Swing		+11.88
Source: Elections Ontario

1894 Ontario general election
Party	Candidate	Votes	%	±%
Liberal-Patrons of Industry	John Bennett	1,809	47.02	–
Liberal	William Mack	1,405	36.52	–17.75
Conservative	Oscar Fulton	633	16.45	–29.27
Total valid votes		3,847	99.64	
Total rejected ballots		14	0.36	–0.09
Turnout		3,861	62.89	–5.49
Eligible voters		6,139		
Liberal-Patrons of Industry gain from Liberal		Swing		+14.64
Source: Elections Ontario

1890 Ontario general election
Party	Candidate	Votes	%	±%
Liberal	William Mack	2,262	54.27	–
Conservative	James Leitch	1,906	45.73	–
Total valid votes		4,168	99.55	
Total rejected ballots		19	0.45	+0.16
Turnout		4,187	68.38	–6.29
Eligible voters		6,123		
Liberal gain from Conservative		Swing		+0.00
Source: Elections Ontario

1883 Ontario general election
Party	Candidate	Votes	%	±%
Conservative	Joseph Kerr	1,145	56.21	+4.03
Liberal	Mr. Warner	892	43.79	–4.03
Total valid votes		2,037	99.71	
Total rejected ballots		6	0.29	+0.29
Turnout		2,043	74.67	–
Eligible voters		2,736		
Conservative hold		Swing		+4.03
Source: Elections Ontario

Ontario provincial by-election, January 23, 1880 Void election
Party	Candidate	Votes	%	±%
Conservative	Joseph Kerr	1,075	52.18	+1.89
Liberal	McNaughton	985	47.82	–1.89
Total valid votes		2,060	100.00	
Total rejected ballots		–		
Turnout		2,060	–	–
Eligible voters				
Conservative hold		Swing		+1.89
Source: Elections Ontario

1879 Ontario general election
Party	Candidate	Votes	%	±%
Conservative	Joseph Kerr	950	50.29	+4.06
Liberal	Mr. Farran	939	49.71	−4.06
Total valid votes		1,889	71.47	−5.72
Eligible voters		2,643		
Conservative gain from Liberal		Swing		+4.06
Source: Elections Ontario

1875 Ontario general election
Party	Candidate	Votes	%	±%
Liberal	James Bethune	948	53.77	+3.95
Conservative	William Colquhoun	815	46.23	−3.95
Total valid votes		1,763	77.19	+2.85
Eligible voters		2,284		
Liberal gain from Conservative		Swing		+3.95
Source: Elections Ontario

Ontario provincial by-election, March 21, 1872 Previous election voided
Party	Candidate	Votes	%	±%
Liberal	James Bethune	790	51.10	+6.75
Conservative	William Colquhoun	756	48.90	−6.75
Total valid votes		1,546	100.0	+8.49
Liberal gain from Conservative		Swing		+6.75
Source: History of the Electoral Districts, Legislatures and Ministries of the Province of Ontario

1871 Ontario general election
Party	Candidate	Votes	%
Conservative	William Colquhoun	705	50.18
Liberal	James Bethune	700	49.82
Turnout		1,405	74.34
Eligible voters		1,890	
Election voided
Source: Elections Ontario

1867 Ontario general election
Party	Candidate	Votes	%
Conservative	William Colquhoun	793	55.65
Liberal	A.J. Cockburn	632	44.35
Total valid votes		1,425	81.15
Eligible voters		1,756	
Conservative pickup new district.			
Source: Elections Ontario
