= William John McCart =

Canadian politician

Ontario MPP
- In office 1908–1911
- Preceded by: George Kerr
- Succeeded by: John Colborne Milligan
- In office 1902–1904
- Preceded by: John McLaughlin
- Succeeded by: George Kerr
- Constituency: Stormont

Personal details
- Born: August 7, 1872 Port Henry, New York
- Died: June 3, 1933 (aged 60) Cornwall, Ontario
- Party: Liberal
- Spouse: Wilhelmina Steele (m. 1892)
- Occupation: Merchant

William John McCart (August 7, 1872 – 1933) was an Ontario merchant and political figure. He represented Stormont in the Legislative Assembly of Ontario from 1902 to 1904 and from 1908 to 1911 as a Liberal member.

He was born in Port Henry, New York, the son of John McCart. He was educated in Brockville, Ontario. He was employed as a clerk with companies in Finch and Maxville, before establishing his own business in Maxville. He later opened a general store in Avonmore. McCart married Wilmena Steele in 1892. He was defeated in the 1905 election but was reelected in 1908. McCart later moved to Toronto where he established a wholesale business dealing in fruit. He drowned at Cornwall in 1933.
