= Speaker Kerr =

Speaker Kerr may refer to:

- James Kirkpatrick Kerr, late Speaker of the Senate of Canada
- Michael C. Kerr (1827–1876), late Speaker of the United States House of Representatives
