= James Bethune (politician) =

Canadian lawyer and politician (1840–1884)

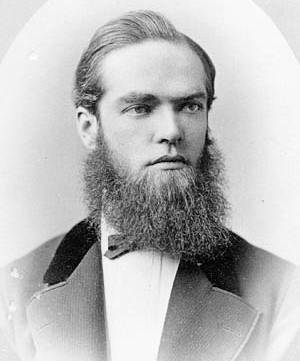

Ontario MPP
- In office 1872–1879
- Preceded by: William Colquhoun
- Succeeded by: Joseph Kerr
- Constituency: Stormont

Personal details
- Born: July 7, 1840 Glengarry County, Upper Canada
- Died: December 18, 1884 (aged 44)
- Party: Liberal
- Occupation: Lawyer

James Bethune (July 7, 1840 – December 18, 1884) was an Ontario lawyer and political figure. He represented Stormont in the Legislative Assembly of Ontario as a Liberal member from 1872 to 1879.

He was born in Glengarry County in Upper Canada in 1840. He studied at Queen's College and University College. He articled in law, was called to the bar in 1862 and opened a practice in Cornwall. In 1865, he was named County Crown Attorney for Stormont, Dundas and Glengarry. He was called to the Quebec bar in 1869. He was elected to the 2nd Parliament of Ontario for Stormont in an 1872 by-election and was reelected in 1875. In 1870, he moved to Toronto and formed a law firm with Edward Blake and James Kirkpatrick Kerr. He retired from politics in 1879.

== Electoral history ==
1871 Ontario general election: Stormont
Party	Candidate	Votes	%
Conservative	William Colquhoun	705	50.18
Liberal	James Bethune	700	49.82
Turnout		1,405	74.34
Eligible voters		1,890	
Election voided
Source: Elections Ontario

Ontario provincial by-election, March 21, 1872: Stormont Previous election voided
Party	Candidate	Votes	%	±%
Liberal	James Bethune	790	51.10	+6.75
Conservative	William Colquhoun	756	48.90	−6.75
Total valid votes		1,546	100.0	+8.49
Liberal gain from Conservative		Swing		+6.75
Source: History of the Electoral Districts, Legislatures and Ministries of the Province of Ontario

1875 Ontario general election: Stormont
Party	Candidate	Votes	%	±%
Liberal	James Bethune	948	53.77	+3.95
Conservative	William Colquhoun	815	46.23	−3.95
Total valid votes		1,763	77.19	+2.85
Eligible voters		2,284		
Liberal gain from Conservative		Swing		+3.95
Source: Elections Ontario
