= Brownridge =

Surname list

Brownridge is a surname. Notable people with the surname include:

- Fergus Beck Brownridge (1889–1978), Canadian politician
- Jared Brownridge (born 1994), American basketball player
