= Joseph Kerr (Canadian politician) =

Canadian politician

Ontario MPP
- In office 1879–1886
- Preceded by: James Bethune
- Succeeded by: William Mack
- Constituency: Stormont

Personal details
- Died: 1902
- Political party: Conservative
- Relations: George Kerr, brother
- Occupation: Merchant

Joseph Kerr (died 1902) was an Ontario merchant and political figure. He represented Stormont in the Legislative Assembly of Ontario as a Conservative member from 1879 to 1886.

He was born in County Fermanagh, Ireland, the son of William Kerr, and came to Canada, where he worked as a conductor on the Grand Trunk Railway. He later settled at Farran's Point in Osnabruck Township, where he established the firm of Kerr Bros. with his three brothers. The firm owned several stores, sawmills, a gristmill and several farms. His election in 1879 was appealed but Kerr won the by-election which followed. With Darby Bergin, he helped establish the Ontario Pacific Railway.

His younger brother George Kerr later represented Stormont in the provincial assembly.
