= Duncan Alexander McNaughton =

Canadian politician

Ontario MPP
- In office 1926–1934
- Preceded by: John Colborne Milligan
- Succeeded by: Fergus Beck Brownridge
- Constituency: Stormont

Personal details
- Born: April 26, 1877 Finch, Ontario
- Died: November 9, 1962 (aged 85) Cornwall, Ontario
- Party: Conservative
- Spouse: Mary McDougall (m. 1919)
- Occupation: Insurance agent

Duncan Alexander McNaughton (April 26, 1877 – November 9, 1962) was an Ontario insurance agent and political figure. He represented Stormont in the Legislative Assembly of Ontario from 1926 to 1934 as a Conservative member.

He was born in Finch, Ontario, the son of F. D. McNaughton, a former county warden. McNaughton was educated at Cornwall, Morrisburg and McGill University. In 1919, he married Mary McDougall. He served as reeve for Finch from 1915 to 1926 and was warden for the United Counties of Stormont, Dundas and Glengarry in 1917. McNaughton was named sheriff and clerk for the County Court in 1943.
