= John Bennett (Canadian politician) =

Canadian politician

Ontario MPP
- In office 1894–1898
- Preceded by: William Mack
- Succeeded by: John McLaughlin
- Constituency: Stormont

Personal details
- Born: 1832 Saint-Polycarpe, Lower Canada
- Died: 1912 (aged 79–80) Maxville, Ontario
- Party: Liberal
- Occupation: Farmer

John Bennett (1832–1912) was an Ontario farmer and political figure. He represented Stormont in the Legislative Assembly of Ontario as a Liberal-Patrons of Industry member from 1894 to 1898.

He was born in Saint-Polycarpe, Lower Canada in 1832, the son of Thomas H. Bennett who served in the Legislative Council of the Province of Canada, and came to Roxborough Township in Upper Canada with his parents while still young. Bennett served as reeve for Roxborough and was warden for Stormont County in 1893. He defeated William Mack for the provincial seat in 1894 and was defeated by John McLaughlin in 1898.

Bennett died at his daughter's farm in Maxville in 1912.
