= John Lawrence McDonald =

Canadian politician

Ontario MPP
- In office 1943–1945
- Preceded by: Fergus Beck Brownridge
- Succeeded by: William Alexander Murray
- Constituency: Stormont
- In office 1948–1951
- Preceded by: William Alexander Murray
- Succeeded by: Peter Manley

Personal details
- Born: August 6, 1894 Cornwall Township, Ontario
- Died: February 26, 1969 (aged 74)
- Party: Progressive Conservative
- Occupation: Farmer

John Lawrence McDonald (August 6, 1894 – February 26, 1969) was an Ontario farmer and political figure. He represented Stormont in the Legislative Assembly of Ontario from 1943 to 1945 and from 1948 to 1951 as a Progressive Conservative member.

He was born in Cornwall Township, Ontario. McDonald served as reeve for the township and was also warden for the United Counties of Stormont, Dundas and Glengarry. He was an unsuccessful candidate for the federal seat in 1953. He died in 1969.
