= John McLaughlin (Ontario politician) =

Canadian politician

Ontario MPP
- In office 1898–1902
- Preceded by: John Bennett
- Succeeded by: William John McCart
- Constituency: Stormont

Personal details
- Born: January 8, 1849 Cornwall Township, Canada West
- Died: June 4, 1911 (aged 62) Avonmore, Ontario
- Party: Conservative
- Spouse: Janet Runions (m. 1872)
- Occupation: Farmer

John McLaughlin (January 8, 1849 – June 4, 1911) was an Ontario farmer and political figure. He represented Stormont in the Legislative Assembly of Ontario as a Conservative member from 1898 to 1902.

He was born in Cornwall Township, Canada West, the son of Felix McLaughlin, an Irish immigrant. McLaughlin was also involved in the lumber trade. He lived at Avonmore in Roxborough Township. In 1872, McLaughlin married Jennett (Janet?) Runions. He served as deputy reeve for the township from 1885 to 1886. He died in Avonmore in 1911.
