= George Kerr (Ontario politician) =

Canadian politician

Ontario MPP
- In office 1905–1908
- Preceded by: William John McCart
- Succeeded by: William John McCart
- Constituency: Stormont

Personal details
- Born: December 18, 1847 County Fermanagh, Ireland
- Died: March 21, 1913 (aged 65)
- Party: Conservative
- Spouse: Margery Ann Sutherland (m. 1872)
- Relations: Joseph Kerr, brother

George Kerr (December 18, 1847 – March 21, 1913) was an Ontario merchant and political figure. He represented Stormont in the Legislative Assembly of Ontario as a Conservative member from 1905 to 1908.

He was born in County Fermanagh, Ireland, in 1849, the son of William Kerr, and came to Farran's Point to join his brother Joseph in business. In 1872, he married Margery Ann Sutherland. Kerr served as reeve for Osnabruck Township for fourteen years and also served as warden for Stormont, Dundas and Glengarry counties in 1890.
