= Robert Austin Shearer =

Canadian politician

Ontario MPP
- In office 1914–1919
- Preceded by: John Colborne Milligan
- Succeeded by: James William McLeod
- Constituency: Stormont

Personal details
- Born: March 16, 1868 Cornwall Township, Ontario
- Died: December 3, 1920 (aged 52) Cornwall, Ontario
- Party: Conservative
- Spouse: May Robertson (m. 1888)
- Occupation: Farmer

Robert Austin Shearer (March 16, 1868 – December 3, 1920) was an Ontario farmer and political figure. He represented Stormont in the Legislative Assembly of Ontario from 1914 to 1919 as a Conservative member.

He was born in Cornwall Township, Ontario, the son of James A. Shearer. In 1888, he married May Robertson. Shearer served as deputy sheriff. For a time, he was involved in the production of aerated water. He died in Cornwall.
