= William Colquhoun =

Canadian politician

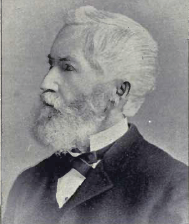

Ontario MPP
- In office 1867–1872
- Preceded by: Riding established
- Succeeded by: James Bethune
- Constituency: Stormont

Personal details
- Born: December 23, 1814
- Died: September 2, 1898 (aged 83)
- Party: Conservative
- Occupation: Businessman

William Colquhoun (December 23, 1814 – September 2, 1898) was an Ontario businessman and political figure. He represented Stormont in the 1st Parliament of Ontario.

He was born in Charlottenburgh, Upper Canada in 1814. He settled at Dickinson's Landing where he was postmaster from 1841 to 1863 and operated a general store. He was the first treasurer for Osnabruck Township and later served as reeve for the township. In 1855, he was elected warden of the United Counties of Stormont, Dundas and Glengarry. He was re-elected in Stormont in 1871, but his election was overturned on appeal and he lost (but was victorious) the subsequent by-election in 1872.

He moved to Cornwall, Ontario in 1876, where he was mayor from 1881 to 1883 and also served as justice of the peace.

== Electoral history ==
1867 Ontario general election: Stormont
Party	Candidate	Votes	%
Conservative	William Colquhoun	793	55.65
Liberal	A.J. Cockburn	632	44.35
Total valid votes		1,425	81.15
Eligible voters		1,756	
Conservative pickup new district.			
Source: Elections Ontario

1871 Ontario general election: Stormont
Party	Candidate	Votes	%
Conservative	William Colquhoun	705	50.18
Liberal	James Bethune	700	49.82
Turnout		1,405	74.34
Eligible voters		1,890	
Election voided
Source: Elections Ontario

Ontario provincial by-election, March 21, 1872: Stormont Previous election voided
Party	Candidate	Votes	%	±%
Liberal	James Bethune	790	51.10	+6.75
Conservative	William Colquhoun	756	48.90	−6.75
Total valid votes		1,546	100.0	+8.49
Liberal gain from Conservative		Swing		+6.75
Source: History of the Electoral Districts, Legislatures and Ministries of the Province of Ontario

1875 Ontario general election: Stormont
Party	Candidate	Votes	%	±%
Liberal	James Bethune	948	53.77	+3.95
Conservative	William Colquhoun	815	46.23	−3.95
Total valid votes		1,763	77.19	+2.85
Eligible voters		2,284		
Liberal gain from Conservative		Swing		+3.95
Source: Elections Ontario
