= David Rae (politician) =

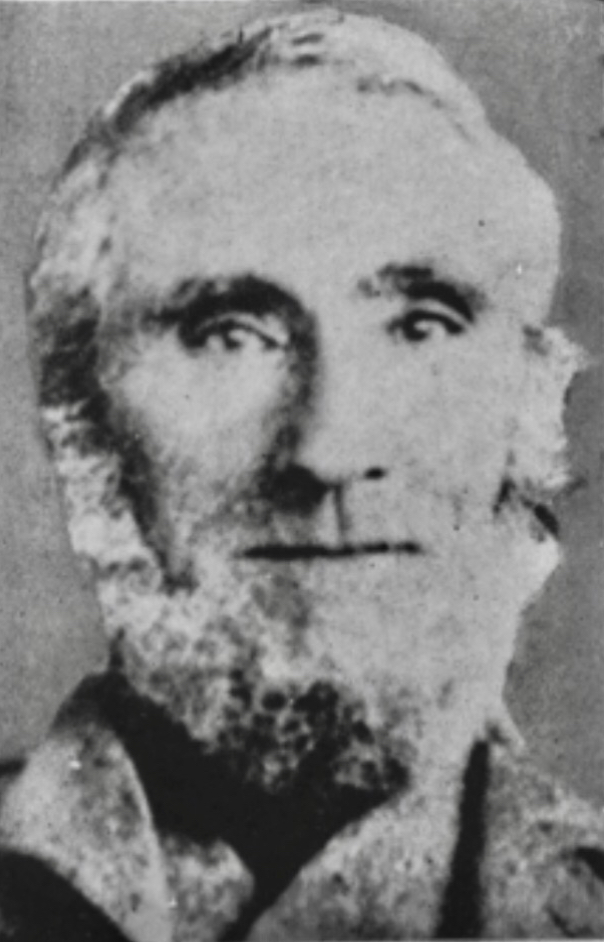

Warden of the United Counties of Stormont, Dundas and Glengarry
- In office 1870–1871
- Preceded by: Angus Bethune
- Succeeded by: Peter Kennedy

Reeve of Winchester Township
- In office 1864–1865
- Preceded by: Giles W. Bogart
- Succeeded by: O.C. Wood
- In office 1866–1867
- Preceded by: O.C. Wood
- Succeeded by: Giles W. Bogart
- In office 1868–1875
- Preceded by: Giles W. Bogart
- Succeeded by: Giles W. Bogart

Personal details
- Born: November 14, 1821 Dumfriesshire, Scotland
- Died: May 31, 1899 (aged 77) Winchester, Ontario
- Spouse: Jennie Carlyle
- Occupation: Reeve, farmer, militiaman

Military service
- Allegiance: Upper Canada
- Branch/service: Canadian militia
- Years of service: 1838 - 1840; 1853 - 1870
- Rank: Private; Ensign; Lieutenant
- Unit: Glengarry Militia; 4th (Winchester) Dundas Battalion; 6th Company, Dundas Reserve Militia
- Battles/wars: Rebellion of 1838: Battle of Beauharnois; Border Tensions

David Rae (November 14, 1821 – May 31, 1899) was a farmer and local politician who served as Warden for the United Counties of Stormont, Dundas and Glengarry.

== Early life ==
David Rae was born on November 14, 1821, in Dumfriesshire, Scotland, to James Rae and Jane Johnstone. The family immigrated to Glengarry County in the early 1820s.

In the early 1850s, Rae moved from Glengarry to Dundas County, settling in Winchester Township near the growing village of Chesterville. He became a successful and prominent farmer in the district.

He married Jennie Carlyle and raised a large family in Winchester.

== Reeve ==
Rae was elected as Deputy Reeve for the township of Winchester in 1858, vice Giles W. Bogart who served as Reeve. Rae was deputy Reeve until 1864, when he was elected to serve as Reeve.

He would serve again as Reeve in 1866, and from 1868 to 1875.

Rae was elected Warden of the United Counties in 1870, serving during a time of industrialization and reorganization following Confederation. His tenure also included the second Fenian Raid, which saw the counties and the city of Cornwall threatened with invasion.

== Militia ==
In 1838, with the outbreak of another rebellion in Lower Canada, Rae enlisted as a private in the Glengarry Militia. He served on duty with them in Quebec, fighting at the Battle of Beauharnois.

When he moved to Winchester, he was appointed an Ensign in the 4th (Winchester) Battalion of the Dundas Militia. He served during the tensions with the United States and the Fenian Raids.

In 1869, the sedentary militia of the province was formed into division of reserve militia, and No. 6 Company, Dundas Reserve Militia was headquartered in Chesterville under Capt. Giles Bogart. David Rae was appointed Lieutenant of the company.

== Later life ==
Rae continued to farm in Winchester, and also worked as a cabinet maker. He was active in local affairs, assisting with the agricultural society and sitting on the first board for the creation of Maple Ridge Cemetery.

He died on May 30, 1899 and is buried in Maple Ridge Cemetery.
