= William Alexander Murray =

Canadian politician

Member of the Ontario Provincial Parliament for Stormont
- In office June 4, 1945 – April 27, 1948
- Preceded by: John Lawrence McDonald
- Succeeded by: John Lawrence McDonald

Personal details
- Party: Liberal

William Alexander Murray was a Canadian politician who was the Liberal Party MPP for Stormont from 1945 to 1948.

== See also ==
- 22nd Parliament of Ontario
