= Alexander Peter Ross =

Canadian politician

Ontario MPP
- In office 1883–1886
- Preceded by: William Mack
- Succeeded by: Riding abolished
- Constituency: Cornwall

Personal details
- Born: December 19, 1831 Cornwall Township, Upper Canada
- Died: October 18, 1915 (aged 83) Cornwall, Ontario
- Party: Conservative
- Occupation: Lumber merchant

Alexander Peter Ross (December 19, 1831 – October 18, 1915) was a politician in Ontario, Canada. He was a Conservative member of the Legislative Assembly of Ontario from 1883 to 1886 who represented the eastern riding of Cornwall.

He was born in Cornwall Township, Upper Canada in 1833. Ross was a lumber merchant and building contractor. He served on the town council and was mayor of Cornwall in 1880. He died in Cornwall in 1915.
