= John Colborne Milligan =

Canadian politician

Ontario MPP
- In office 1923–1926
- Preceded by: James William McLeod
- Succeeded by: Duncan Alexander McNaughton
- In office 1911–1914
- Preceded by: William John McCart
- Succeeded by: Robert Austin Shearer
- Constituency: Stormont

Personal details
- Born: April 11, 1868 Newington, Ontario
- Died: February 17, 1941 (aged 72) Cornwall, Ontario
- Party: Conservative
- Spouse: Maud Percival (m. 1928)
- Occupation: Lawyer

John Colborne Milligan (April 11, 1868 – February 17, 1942) was an Ontario lawyer, judge and political figure. He represented Stormont in the Legislative Assembly of Ontario from 1911 to 1914 and 1923 to 1926 as a Conservative member.

He was born on a farm near Newington, Ontario, the son of William Milligan, an Irish immigrant. He taught school and then attended the University of Toronto and Osgoode Hall. He was called to the bar in 1899 and set up practice in Cornwall. Milligan served on the high school board, was a police magistrate and then juvenile court judge. In 1928, he was named King's Counsel. Milligan married Maud Percival.
