= Fernand Guindon =

Canadian politician (1917–1985)

Ontario MPP
- In office 1963–1974
- Preceded by: Peter Manley
- Succeeded by: George Samis
- Constituency: Stormont
- In office 1957–1963
- Preceded by: Osie Villeneuve
- Succeeded by: Osie Villeneuve
- Constituency: Glengarry

Personal details
- Born: May 30, 1917 Fugèreville, Quebec
- Died: August 21, 1985 (aged 68)
- Party: Progressive Conservative
- Spouse: Claire-Marie Rouette
- Relations: Luc Guindon (son)
- Children: 5

Joseph Roméo Fernand Guindon (May 30, 1917 – August 21, 1985) was a politician in Ontario, Canada. He was a Progressive Conservative member of the Legislative Assembly of Ontario from 1957 to 1974 who represented the ridings of Glengarry and then Stormont. He served as a cabinet minister in the governments John Robarts and Bill Davis.

== Background ==
He was born in Fugèreville, Quebec, the son of Pascal Guindon and Josephine Lalonde, and he was educated in Bourget, Ontario and at the University of Ottawa. He married Claire-Marie Rouette (1917 - 2007). He settled at Apple Hill, Ontario after World War II, later moving to Cornwall. He was secretary for the Chamber of Commerce at Apple Hill.

After graduating from school he worked for the Ottawa newspaper Le Droit and as a translator for the federal government. He also worked for his father's fuel oil business. In 1956, Guindon and his wife, Claire-Marie, founded a two-bay full-service gas station and home heating oil distribution service, known as Guindon Glenoco Ltd., on Pitt Street in Cornwall. The business later expanded to include a second service station on Marleau Avenue, in Cornwall, and it remains active today (2014). All five of Guindon's sons have been actively involved in the business. Guindon also served as a Director of the Ontario Plowmen's Association.

His son Luc later served in the Ontario legislature.

== Politics ==
In the 1953 federal election, Guindon ran as the Progressive Conservative candidate in the riding Glengarry—Prescott but lost to Liberal candidate Raymond Bruneau by 2,245 votes. In 1957 he ran in a provincial by-election in the riding of Glengarry. He defeated Liberal John McClennan by 2,130 votes. He was re-elected in 1959. In 1963, he moved to the nearby riding of Stormont and was elected. He was re-elected in 1967 and 1971.

In 1963, he served as Chairman of the St. Lawrence Parks Commission.

In November 1967, he was appointed to cabinet by John Robarts as a Minister without portfolio. In March 1971, he was promoted to Minister of Tourism and Information in the first cabinet of Bill Davis. In February 1972, he was moved to Minister of Labour.

In April 1972, Guindon was called upon to resolve the then-longest municipal strike in the history of the City of Toronto. He was able to engineer a compromise that brought to an end a 30-day strike that had seen 120,000 tons of garbage piled up at 200 temporary collection sites across the city. In 1973, he brought about an increase to the minimum wage which was set at $2.00/hr.

In 1974, Guindon resigned his seat to run unsuccessfully in the federal riding of Stormont—Dundas, losing to the Liberal candidate, Ed Lumley.

=== Cabinet positions ===
Davis ministry, Province of Ontario (1971–1985)
Cabinet posts (2)
Predecessor	Office	Successor
Gordon Carton	Minister of Labour; 1972–1974	John MacBeth
James Auld	Minister of Tourism and Information; 1971–1972	John White
Robarts ministry, Province of Ontario (1961–1971)
Sub-Cabinet Post
Predecessor	Title	Successor
	Minister without portfolio (1967–1971)	

== Later life and legacy ==
In 1974 he returned to running his father's fuel oil business, Guindon Petroleum Ltd. He also served as vice-chairman of the Wintario board. He died of heart failure in 1985. In deference to his lengthy public service, the largest park in the west end of the City of Cornwall, Ontario was named in his honour while he was still an MPP.
