= New York and Ottawa Railway =

Overview
- Headquarters: Saint Regis Falls, New York; Tupper Lake, New York; Ottawa, Ontario
- Locale: Tupper Lake, New York to Ottawa, Ontario
- Dates of operation: 1883–part of the New York Central Railroad Company (1905); Closed (1957); sections of track still in use

Technical
- Track gauge: 4 ft 8 1/2 in (1,435 mm) standard gauge

The New York and Ottawa Railway was a railway connecting Tupper Lake in northeastern New York to Ottawa, Ontario, via Ramsayville, Russell, Embrun, Finch and Cornwall. It became part of the New York Central Railroad system in 1913, although it was under the larger company's possession since the end of 1904. It had started out as the Northern Adirondack Railroad and evolved into the Northern New York Railroad, the New York and Ottawa Railroad, and was last known as the New York and Ottawa Railway before being merged into the New York Central and Hudson River Railroad. Other lines that were a part of this route are described below.

== History ==
=== Northern Adirondack Railroad: 1883-1895 ===
The Northern Adirondack Railroad was chartered February 9, 1883 to build from Moira on the Ogdensburg and Lake Champlain Railroad south to St. Regis Falls. The company was owned by Peter MacFarlane, Charles Hotchkiss and John Hurd. Logging businessmen were hoping to use this railroad to ship out their logs from the region. The line opened on September 25, 1883, with a rented locomotive from the Ogdensburg and Lake Champlain Railroad, which derailed when it entered St. Regis Falls. MacFarlane was soon bought out by Hotchkiss and Hurd, and eventually John Hurd became the majority owner.

In 1885, Hurd had extended his railroad southward to Santa Clara, but it remained inactive until a new company was created to operate this section and extend it farther south, eventually reaching Tupper Lake. This company would merge into the Northern Adirondack Railroad in 1890 (see below). On July 1 of that year, the first train entered Tupper Lake. Hurd's business practices would eventually send him into debt, and, before he declared bankruptcy, his railroad went into receivership on January 25, 1894. On May 25, 1895, the railroad was sold to a business syndicate and two days later was renamed the Northern New York Railroad.

=== Northern Adirondack Extension Railroad: 1885-1890 ===
The Northern Adirondack Extension Railroad was chartered on February 17, 1886, to take over the existing rails between St. Regis Falls and Santa Clara, as well as to extend the Northern Adirondack Railroad south to Tupper Lake in the Adirondack Mountains: the site of the largest saw mill in the U.S. at the time. The first section of the extension opened on July 6, 1886, south to Brandon. The remaining section to Tupper Lake was completed in 1889, with regular service to the southern terminus starting on July 1, 1890. Prior to that, on April 5, the Northern Adirondack Extension was merged into the Northern Adirondack Railroad.

In 1887 Patrick Ducey, who owned a large tract of land south of Brandon, had built his own logging railroad from his jackworks in Black Rapids to a point on the Northern Adirondack Extension Railroad called Black Rapids Junction. Although the John Hurd-owned railroad was not completed and officially opened, it could be assumed that some kinds of shipments were hauled out from Ducey's operations. This small line would become Northern Adirondack Railroad property about 1889, when the line opened to Tupper Lake.

In 1892, the Mohawk and Malone Railway was completed and crossed the northern Adirondacks at Tupper Lake Junction, just west of Tupper Lake.

One of the last items that the Northern Adirondack Extension Railroad had done was to negotiate for trackage rights over the Saratoga and St. Lawrence Railroad, which was running at that time from Moira to Bombay on the Grand Trunk Railway's United States and Canada Railroad, which was a line that linked Massena to Montreal. John Hurd had plans to add this small rail line to his own company.

=== Ontario Pacific Railway: 1882–1897 ===
The Ontario Pacific Railway concept was originally planned out by Cornwall, Ontario, politicians Dr. Darby Bergin (Member of Parliament) and Joseph Kerr (Member of the Legislature) in 1880. Four plans were brought up:

Plan #1 – line starting at Cornwall and head to Crysler, then end at Perth. A branch from Cornwall to Ottawa was included. The Ottawa terminus was on King Edward Avenue on the University of Ottawa campus.

Plan #2 – line starting at Cornwall and head to Newington, then run through Smiths Falls, ending at Perth. A branch from Cornwall to Ottawa was included.

Plan #3 – line starting at Cornwall and head to Newington, then run through Smiths Falls, ending at Perth. A branch from Cornwall to Crysler was included.

Plan #4 – line starting at Cornwall and head to Newington, then run through Smiths Falls, Perth, Glen Tay and Actinolite, then junction at Madoc to the Grand Junction Railway, where running rights could be granted to Peterborough; more running rights over the Midland Railway of Canada from Peterborough to Orillia; then another granting of running rights over the Northern & North Western Railway from Orillia to Gravenhurst. There, the company would build northward and end east of the French River settlement.

Debate of the four plans continued until it was agreed that the proposal would following a route from Cornwall to Embrun to Richmond to Perth to Lake St. Peter to French River to Sault Ste. Marie, with branches from Pickerel Lake to Parry Sound, Manotick to Ottawa, and Cornwall through Malone to Lyon Mountain by means of a bridge over the St. Lawrence River.

Bergin & Kerr's company received its charter on May 17, 1882, as the Ontario Pacific Railway. The approved route was from Cornwall to Ottawa, through Arnprior and Eganville to Lake Nipissing to a point at or near French River, with a branch from Cornwall to Smiths Falls or Perth. Also included was the right to build a bridge over the St. Lawrence River at Cornwall to connect to any American railroad.

On May 25, 1883, the planned route was extended to Sault Ste. Marie and the branch to Smiths Falls or Perth was to leave the main line at Newington, and go through Carleton Place to end at Almonte. A third branch was to leave the main line between Eganville and Renfrew and end at Pembroke.

Although Bergin never stopped the promotion of his railway, Kerr had to bow-out to focus on his other businesses. Through the years, the Ontario Pacific Railway lay dormant, although meetings were held often, but work never got underway. It would not be until a fateful train trip in 1896 between Ottawa and Coteau Station that Bergin would meet Charles Hibbard, owner of the Northern New York Railroad, that progress would finally be made. A deal was struck between the two businessmen, and their companies were to work together to form one line from Ottawa to New York City. Bergin did not see his dream come true, as he died that October. His brother, John, took the reins and the Ontario Pacific Railway changed its name on May 21, 1897, to the Ottawa & New York Railway.

=== Northern New York Railroad 1895-1897 ===
After the Northern Adirondack Railroad was purchased—bought on May 25, 1895—the syndicate (led by Charles Hibbard) reorganized it as the Northern New York Railroad two days later. Although uncertain, it appears that Hibbard managed to acquire trackage rights east of Moira on the Ogdensburg and Lake Champlain Railroad to Malone.

Hibbard was not unlike John Hurd. He, too, envisioned a greater railroad that would expand its reach to new areas. His group had created the Racquette River Railroad on April 25, 1895, for the purpose of building a rail route between Tupper Lake and Axton Landing. From that point, the Delaware & Hudson had planned to extend its Adirondack Railway that terminated at North Creek to Axton landing under the Adirondack Extension Railroad charter. Hibbard's trains were to have running rights to Saratoga Springs, and then on to New York City.

The second extension was to build northward into Canada. At first, it was planned to take over the Saratoga & St. Lawrence Railroad and then head to St. Regis in Quebec. From there, Hibbard's line would build to Ottawa. From June 11 to July 30, 1896, the Northern New York Railroad operated the Saratoga & St. Lawrence Railroad, but for unknown reasons Hibbard was not pleased with it. Instead, he planned to build northward from Moira himself, and a new company was created to do so. After meeting Dr. Darby Bergin from the Ontario Pacific Railway, Hibbard formed a partnership with him and these two railroaders planned to connect Ottawa to the Adirondack line. On October 28, 1897, the Northern New York Railroad merged into this new northern extension company.

=== Ottawa & New York Railway 1897-1957 ===
When Dr. Darby Bergin and Charles Hibbard finalized their agreements, the Ontario Pacific Railway plans were revised. On May 21, 1897, the company was renamed to The Ottawa & New York Railway and was to build from Cornwall to Ottawa as well as to construct a bridge crossing over the St. Lawrence River at Cornwall. Construction began on August 23 and was quickly completed, opening on July 29, 1898, although the first revenue train operated the year before from Crysler to Finch. Before the opening day, the company was purchased by its American partner on June 13, 1898, and had dropped 'The' from its title.

Although the American company had been purchased by the New York Central & Hudson River Railroad, the Ottawa & New York Railway continued to exist as a company and owner of its rail line, but the majority shareholders were New York Central interests. From 1905 to 1957, the Ottawa & New York Railway was operated under a lease by the New York Central until abandonment and the selling of the property. The Ottawa & New York Railway was dissolved on December 20, 1957.

=== New York & Ottawa Railroad 1897-1905 ===
The New York and Ottawa Railroad was chartered on July 22, 1897, to build an extension north from Moira to the St. Lawrence River, where it would connect to the Ottawa and New York Railway. On October 28 the Northern New York was merged into the New York and Ottawa. The NY&O acquired the O&NY's stock on June 13, 1898. On September 28 of that year, the line in New York was completed, running to the St. Lawrence River at Rooseveltown. By the time the bridge crossing over the St. Lawrence River was completed, the Black Rapids Branch of the line was abandoned.

An extension south from Tupper Lake was also planned as part of the new line. On April 25, 1895, the Racquette River Railroad was created to build from Tupper Lake to Axton Landing, where the Adirondack Extension Railroad was to build to North Creek. This company went under the New York and Ottawa Railroad control in November 1898. Construction was begun on the south side of Tupper Lake. This southern extension was not finished, due to the refusal of the State Forest Preserve to allow the New York and Ottawa Railroad to build in the state-owned park, but was likely influenced by the New York Central Railroad, which had an existing line from Herkimer to Malone.

The entire route from Ottawa to Tupper Lake was finally operating on October 1, 1900, which was after the company entered receivership on April 25, 1900. The company was sold to New York Central interests on December 22, 1904, and was renamed the New York & Ottawa Railway on January 19, 1905. This was followed by the company being leased to the New York Central & Hudson River railroad on February 1.

=== St. Lawrence River crossing at Cornwall ===
The crossing of the St. Lawrence River at Cornwall was the single most important part of the construction of the Ottawa to Tupper Lake route. At the time of its opening, there were no other bridge crossings between Queenston and Coteau Landing. The crossing consisted of two bridges, one span over the south channel, most of it being in the United States, made up of three Pratt trusses, and the second over the north channel, all in Canada, being of a cantilever design, as well as a swing span over the Cornwall Canal.

Companywise, it began on July 28, 1897, with the creation of the Cornwall Bridge Company that was to construct the south channel bridge, as it was decided to cross at Cornwall where the river was split in two by Cornwall Island. The north channel bridge was to be constructed by the Ottawa & New York Railway. Construction was done quickly by Phoenix Bridge Company, but, on September 6, 1898, a tragic accident claimed the lives of 15 workers and injured 18 others. Pier 2 of the south channel bridge had suddenly sunk into the river, taking two of the three spans down with it, just as the finishing touches were being completed on it. An investigation ruled that the bridge company and Sooysmith Company, who built the piers, did not test the river bed properly and built the piers on unstable ground. What was thought to have been bedrock was actually 5 feet (1.5 m) of gravel that rested on top of 20 feet (6.1 m) of clay. The rebuilding of the south channel bridge was tendered/out and Union Bridge Company won the contract. The bridge was opened for regular traffic on October 1, 1900, with an official opening on December 11.

Other companies were involved concerning the bridge throughout its life. On April 18, 1899, the New York & Ottawa Bridge Company was created to operate the crossing and started a lease of it on November 1, 1900. This lasted until September 6, 1917, when this company was dissolved and the Cornwall Bridge Company merged into New York Central Lines.

During the 1920s, negotiations with several parties began to find a means to have the Cornwall railway bridge system support automobile traffic as well. Many plans were submitted, but it was agreed to plank the existing bridges (as well as build a road bridge beside the railway bridge over the Racquette River), so that both trains and cars would share the right-of-way. On November 23, 1931, the Cornwall-Northern New York International Bridge Corporation was created to handle the planking and operate the bridge system. May 17, 1934 was when the first automobile crossed over the bridges; the corporation took control on the 29th and everything was officially opened on June 30, with the bridges being commemorated as the Roosevelt International Bridges.

The corporation lasted until 1949, when the Roosevelt International Bridge Company took possession of the bridges, and operated over them until 1957.

=== New York Central Railroad: 1905-1957 ===
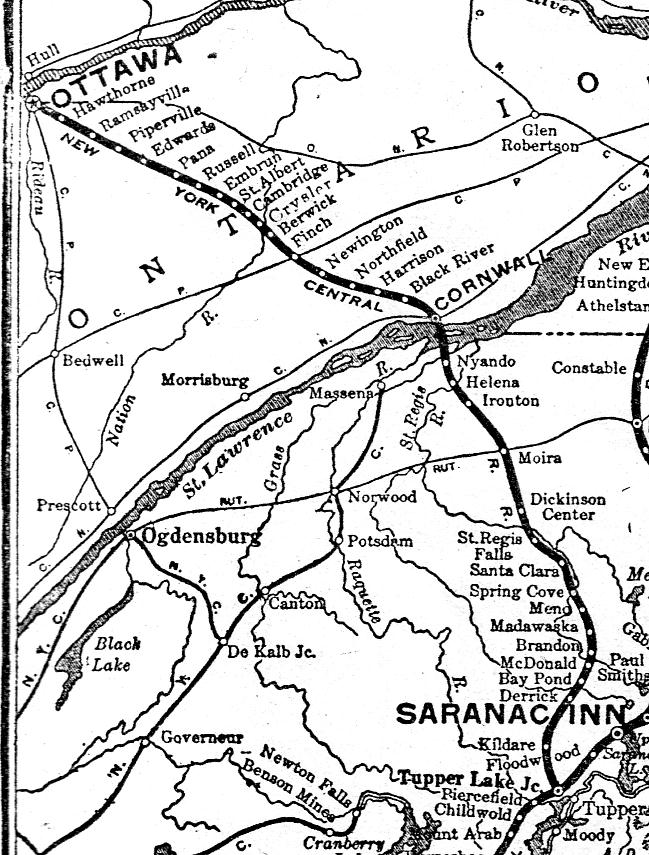
Map of the New York and Ottawa Railway in 1915

On December 22, 1904, the line was bought, and was reorganized on January 19, 1905, as the New York and Ottawa Railway. It was leased to the New York Central and Hudson River Railroad on February 1, becoming its Ottawa Division, and merged into the successor New York Central Railroad company on March 7, 1913.

The line was abandoned from Tupper Lake Junction to Helena on May 6, 1937, and then from Rooseveltown to Ottawa on March 22, 1957.

=== After 1957 ===
The bridges at Cornwall were removed by the St. Lawrence Seaway: the south span in 1958 and the north span in 1965. Meanwhile, Canadian National Railways purchased the Canadian portion of the route in April 1957 and used the rails to build a new hump yard in Montreal. They left a section from Hawthorne to the Terminal Avenue Yard in Ottawa, and then by the end of 1957 reopened a portion from Hawthorne to Ramsayville. This relaid section was removed in 1972. The remaining track in Ottawa was in service until 2002, when the Ottawa Central Railway removed the tracks opposite the Canada Science and Technology Museum to the yard. On November 1, 2008, the Ottawa Central was purchased by Canadian National Railway. In Cornwall, the track was relaid from the Canadian National Railway main line to what was once Cornwall Junction in 1971, as the Wesco Spur.

In the United States, the track from Rooseveltown to Helena has remained in use since the New York Central Railroad years. It has managed to survive Penn Central Transportation, Conrail, and CSX ownership and is still in use presently. The track in Tupper Lake was used until Penn Central abandoned it in 1972, but was put back in service by the Adirondack Railway from 1979 to 1981. Today, the tracks remain on the right-of-way for future use by the Adirondack Railroad. They have been pulled up at the road crossings, but the connection to the Adirondack Branch is still in place.

== See also ==
- List of defunct Ontario railways

== Sources ==
All information above comes from the web page of the New York Central's Ottawa Division - a History, as well as research documents in possession of that webmaster (whom edited this entire entry in July 2006) and his partners. These documents were obtained through various collections (Canadian National Archive, many Historical Societies, original timetables and operating manuals) as well as published books like Railroads of the Adirondacks: a History by Michael Kudish, 1996.
