= William Mack (Ontario politician) =

Canadian politician

Ontario MPP
- In office 1890–1894
- Preceded by: Joseph Kerr
- Succeeded by: John Bennett
- Constituency: Stormont
- In office 1886–1890
- Preceded by: New riding
- Succeeded by: Riding abolished
- Constituency: Cornwall and Stormont
- In office 1879–1883
- Preceded by: John Goodall Snetsinger
- Succeeded by: Alexander Peter Ross
- Constituency: Cornwall

Personal details
- Born: February 29, 1828 Lanarkshire, Scotland
- Died: December 11, 1897 (aged 69) Cornwall, Ontario
- Party: Liberal
- Spouse: Agnes Henderson (m. 1855)
- Occupation: Businessman

William Mack (February 29, 1828 – December 11, 1897) was an Ontario businessman and political figure. He represented Cornwall from 1879 to 1883, Cornwall and Stormont from 1886 to 1890 and Stormont from 1890 to 1894 in the Legislative Assembly of Ontario as a Liberal member.

He was born in Lanarkshire, Scotland in 1828, the son of Robert Mack, and was brought to Huntingdon County, Lower Canada, by his parents during his first year of life. He grew up there and moved to Cornwall, Canada West in 1849, where he managed a gristmill. In 1855, he married Agnes Henderson. Mack went into business on his own, also helping to establish paper, cotton and woollen mills at Cornwall. He served as reeve of Cornwall in 1871 and 1876 and as warden for the United Counties of Stormont, Dundas and Glengarry in 1878. He was defeated by Alexander Peter Ross for the seat in the provincial assembly in 1883 but elected again in 1886.

His daughter Margaret married Alexander McCracken, who was a mayor of Cornwall, and his son William R. later served as sheriff for the United Counties.

== Electoral history ==
1879 Ontario general election: Cornwall
Party	Candidate	Votes
Liberal	William Mack	Acclaimed
Source: Elections Ontario
