= Finch, Ontario =

Finch
- Unincorporated community
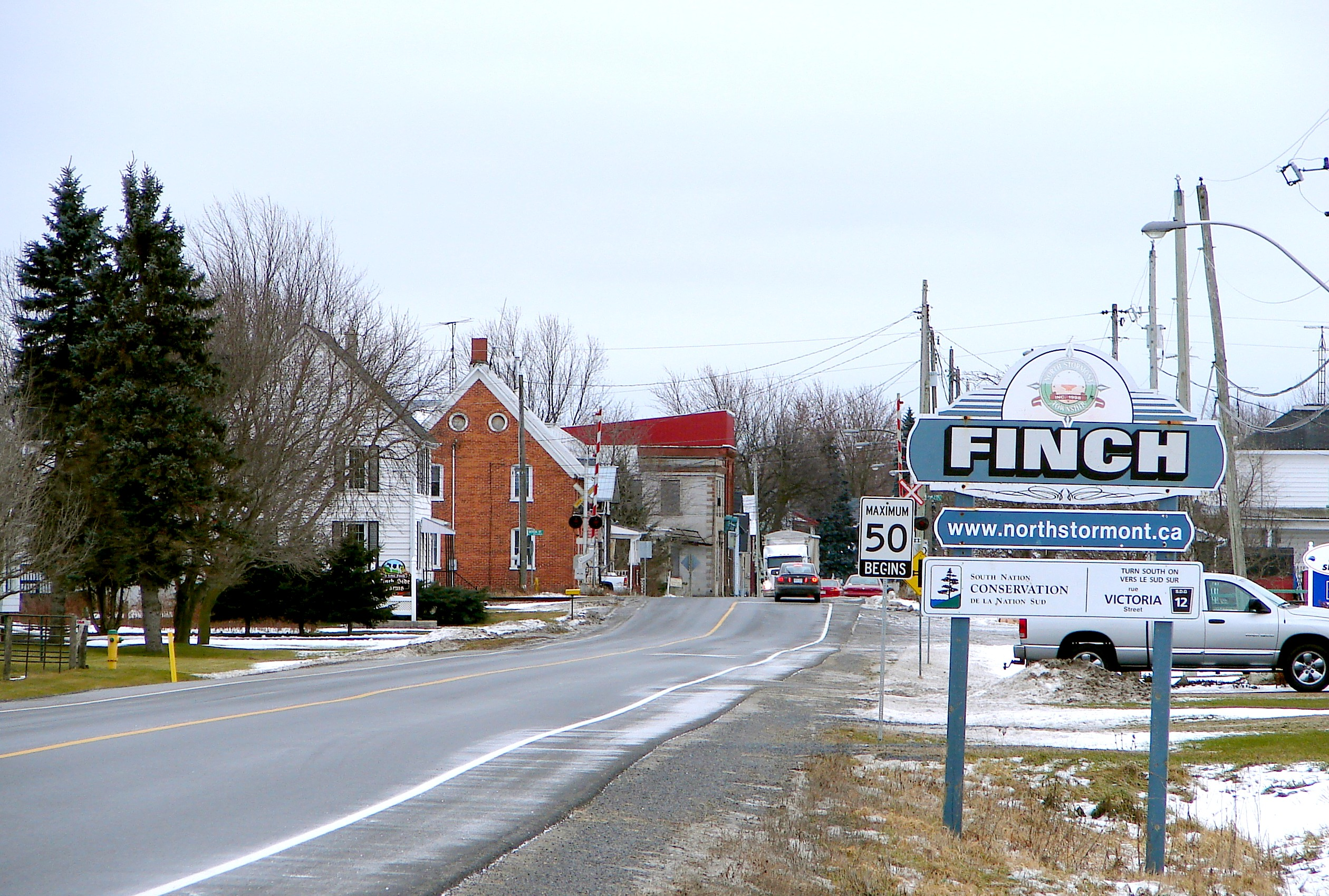

- Location within Southern Ontario
- Coordinates: 45°08′38″N 75°05′08″W
- Country: Canada
- Province: Ontario
- County: Stormont, Dundas and Glengarry
- Municipality: North Stormont
- Settled: 1803
- Incorporated: 1906
- Dissolved (amalgamated): January 1, 1998

Government
  - Fed. riding: Stormont—Dundas—Glengarry
  - Prov. riding: Stormont—Dundas—South Glengarry

Area
  - Land: 2.07 km^{2} (0.80 sq mi)
- Elevation: 84 m (275 ft)

Population (2021)
  - Total: 506
  - Density: 244.4/km^{2} (633/sq mi)
- Time zone: UTC-5 (EST)
  - Summer (DST): UTC-4 (EDT)
- Postal code: K0C 1K0
- Area codes: 613

Finch is an unincorporated community in North Stormont, Ontario, Canada. It is recognized as a designated place by Statistics Canada.

== History ==
Finch was founded by Scottish settlers, the Cameron and MacMillan families, arriving in 1803. The location was originally called Gray’s Corners, later renamed to South Finch, after local school master Joseph Finch. In 1850, the first school building was built. In 1885, the Canadian Pacific Railway was built through the area, and at that time, the place name was shortened to Finch. In 1897, the Ottawa and New York Railway was constructed.

In March 1906, Finch was incorporated as a village municipality, with Geo. L. MacLean as the first reeve. The following year, on May 16 and 17, a large fire destroyed much of the village, including many stores, the bank, library, armory, Orange Lodge, 2 churches, the telephone exchange, and telegraph office. In 1919, fire again burnt down a major portion of the community.

On January 1, 1998, the Village of Finch, together with Finch Township and Roxborough Township, was amalgamated into the new Township of North Stormont.

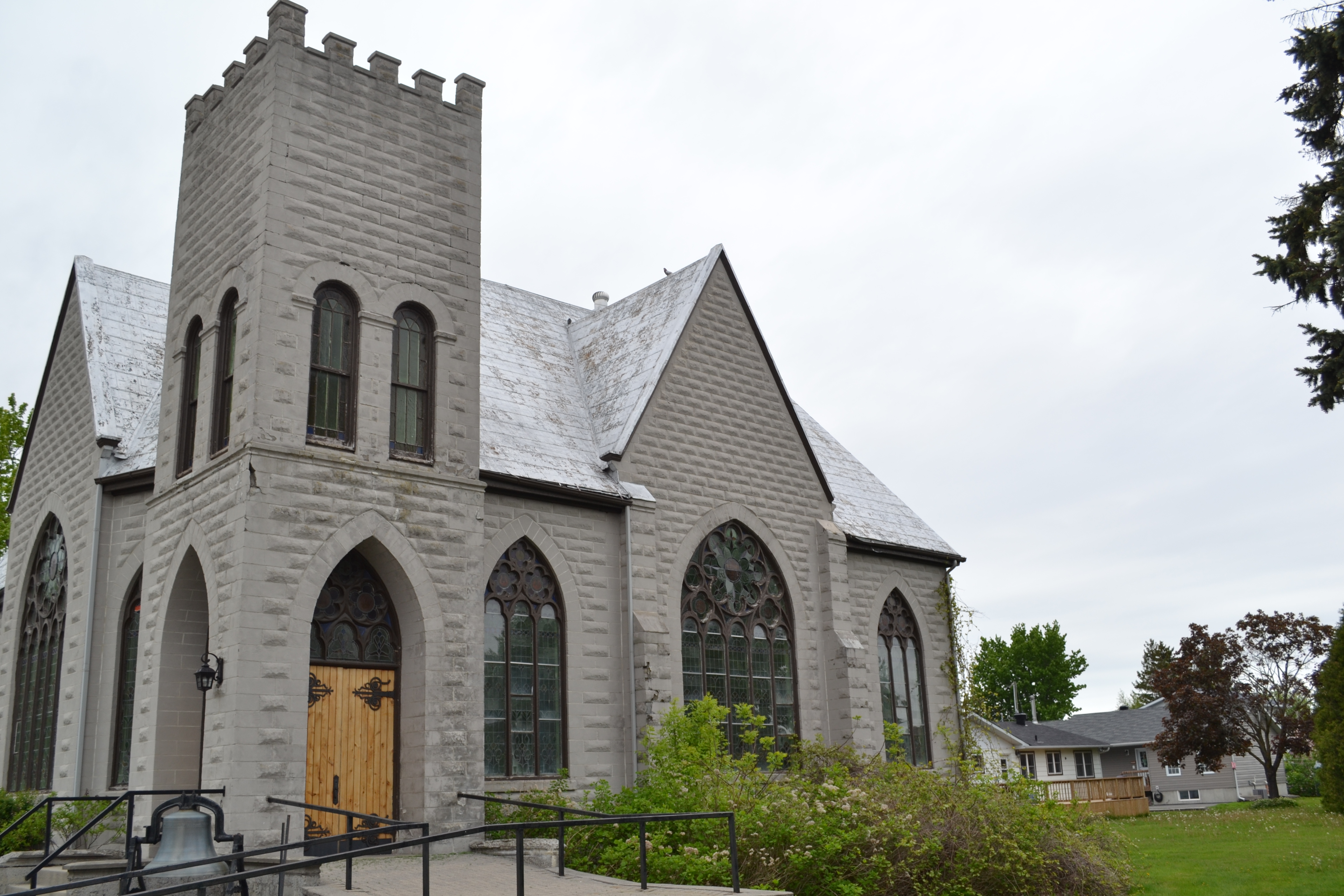
St. Luke's-Knox Presbyterian Church in Finch, a designated heritage property

== Demographics ==
In the 2021 Census of Population conducted by Statistics Canada, Finch had a population of 506 living in 214 of its 217 total private dwellings, a change of 21.3% from its 2016 population of 417. With a land area of 2.07 km^{2} (0.80 sq mi), it had a population density of 244.4/km^{2} (633.1/sq mi) in 2021.

Historical census populations – Finch, Ontario

Year	Pop.	±%
1901	284	—
1911	411	+44.7%
1921	383	−6.8%
1931	386	+0.8%
1941	397	+2.8%
1951	393	−1.0%
1956	389	−1.0%

Year	Pop.	±%
1961	386	−0.8%
1966	384	−0.5%
1971	397	+3.4%
1976	407	+2.5%
1981	353	−13.3%
1986	393	+11.3%
1991	456	+16.0%

Year	Pop.	±%
1996	458	+0.4%
2001	381	−16.8%
2006	429	+12.6%
2011	474	+10.5%
2016	417	−12.0%
2021	506	+21.3%

2021 Population figure based on revised count.
Source: Statistics Canada

== Railway ==
In 1954, the lines of the Canadian Pacific Railway (CPR) and the New York Central (NYC) crossed in Finch, and Canadian Pacific had a train station in the community. Station Master, a 1954 film by the National Film Board of Canada, chronicled a day in the life of the stationmaster and other railway workers in Finch. In 1957, the NYC ceased operation and the rails were removed. And the CPR station was closed in 1969.

== See also ==
- List of communities in Ontario
- List of designated places in Ontario
