= Fergus Beck Brownridge =

Canadian politician

Ontario MPP
- In office 1934–1943
- Preceded by: Duncan Alexander McNaughton
- Succeeded by: John Lawrence McDonald
- Constituency: Stormont

Personal details
- Born: July 18, 1887 Fergus, Ontario
- Died: March 2, 1968 (aged 78)
- Party: Liberal
- Occupation: Businessman

Fergus Beck Brownridge (July 18, 1887 – March 21, 1968) was an Ontario banker and political figure. He represented Stormont in the Legislative Assembly of Ontario as a Liberal member from 1934 to 1943.

He was born in Fergus, Ontario, the son of John Brownridge. He was manager for the Royal Bank of Canada branch at Cornwall for 14 years. He later served as secretary-treasurer for the Cornwall General Hospital, clerk for the city of Cornwall and president of the Cornwall Cheese Board. Brownridge was president of the Cornwall Chamber of Commerce from 1919 to 1920.
