= James Kirkpatrick Kerr =

Canadian politician

The Honourable James Kirkpatrick Kerr PC KC
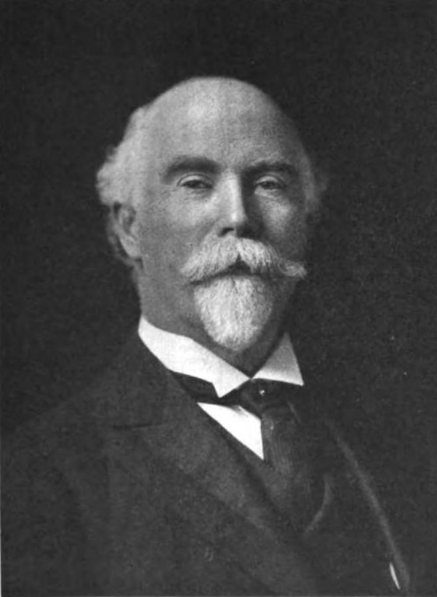

Canadian Senator from Ontario
- In office 1903–1916
- Appointed by: Wilfrid Laurier

Speaker of the Senate
- In office 1909–1911
- Preceded by: Raoul Dandurand
- Succeeded by: Auguste Charles Philippe Robert Landry

Personal details
- Born: 1 August 1841 Near Guelph, Canada West
- Died: 4 December 1916 (aged 75) Toronto, Ontario, Canada
- Party: Liberal

James Kirkpatrick Kerr PC KC (1 August 1841 – 4 December 1916) was a Canadian lawyer and Senator. He served as Speaker of the Senate of Canada during the 11th Parliament from 14 January 1909 to 22 October 1911.

== Background ==
Kerr was born in Guelph in what was then Canada West in the Province of Canada. He was called to the bar of Upper Canada in 1862 and began a legal partnership with Edward Blake, Samuel Blake and James Bethune. He became head, in 1884, of the legal firm of Kerr, Davidson, Paterson and Grant.

In his career, Kerr argued several cases before the Judicial Committee of the Privy Council and was elected a Bencher of the Law Society of Upper Canada in 1879.

He was an active Liberal and unsuccessfully ran for election to the House of Commons of Canada in 1891 from Toronto Centre.

He became president of the Ontario Liberal Association in 1892 and was appointed to the Senate of Canada on 12 March 1903. He was appointed Speaker of that body six years later.

Kerr was also an active Mason and was Grand Master of the Grand Lodge of Canada from 1875 to 1877.

He was also active in commerce and served on several boards of directors including the Canadian General Electric Company. He was one of the founders of Havergal College.

As a former Speaker of the Senate of Canada James Kerr was given membership in the Queen's Privy Council for Canada in 1911.
