= James William McLeod =

Canadian politician

Ontario MPP
- In office 1919–1923
- Preceded by: Robert Austin Shearer
- Succeeded by: John Colborne Milligan
- Constituency: Stormont

Personal details
- Born: July 2, 1871 Cornwall Township, Ontario
- Died: July 7, 1931 (aged 60)
- Party: Liberal
- Spouse: Bertha Sullivan (m. 1891)
- Occupation: Farmer

James William McLeod (July 2, 1871 – July 7, 1931) was an Ontario farmer and political figure. He represented Stormont in the Legislative Assembly of Ontario as a Liberal member from 1919 to 1923.

He was born in Cornwall Township, Ontario, the son of James McLeod, and educated in Cornwall and Kingston. He worked as a contractor during the construction of the Cornwall Canal and went on to do railway construction in the southern United States. He returned to Cornwall, where he worked as a salesman for the Cornwall Cheese and Butter Board, later serving as secretary-treasurer. McLeod married Bertha Sullivan. He served as reeve for the township and then was township clerk and treasurer from 1915 until his death in 1931. He was an unsuccessful candidate for a seat in the provincial assembly in 1916. McLeod also served as president of the Stormont Lacrosse League.
