= Farran's Point, Ontario =

Ghost Town in Ontario, Canada

Coordinates: 44.9793°N 74.9982°W

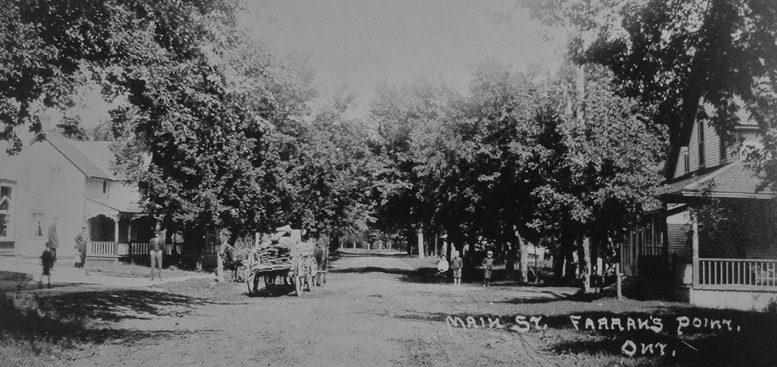
Main street of Farran's Point, Ontario in 1914.

Farran's Point is an underwater ghost town in the province of Ontario, Canada. It is one of Ontario's Lost Villages, which were permanently flooded by the creation of the St. Lawrence Seaway in 1958.

Families and businesses in Farran's Point were moved to the new town of Ingleside before the seaway construction commenced. The small village is submerged under shallow water; portions of sidewalks and foundations can be seen when the water of the St. Lawrence River is low.

It is the birthplace of NHL Hockey Hall of Famer Cy Denneny.

== History ==
While legend has it that Jacob Farrand, a United Empire Loyalist, was the first settler at Farran’s Point and that the family changed the spelling of the name in subsequent years, research has proven that this is just a legend. Farrand was granted land in the Township of Williamsburg, not the Township of Osnabruck, and he spent many years of his life in the Town of Cornwall.

Research indicates that it was Charles Curtis Farran Sr., an immigrant to Upper Canada from Dublin, Ireland, in the 1790s, whose name is associated with the naming of the village of Farran’s Point. In 1808, he married Catherine Baker, daughter of Adam Baker Sr U.E.L. He operated an inn in the vicinity of the canal that was eventually constructed along the St. Lawrence at Farran’s Point in 1847. An Order in Council granted Catherine the property at Farran’s Point on January 26, 1808 as the daughter of a Loyalist.

It was Charles Curtis Farran, affectionately known as C.C., and later on the Kerr brothers, George and Joseph, who were responsible for the village’s early growth. C.C. Farran owned several mills that included a grist mill, located at the lock, a carding mill, sawmill, and shingle mill. He also owned a general store, as well as a large tract of land north of the village and west of where the Grand Trunk Railway Station was eventually built. Farran built a power station near the rapids on the St. Lawrence in front of the village. In the early 1800s, several mills were established by Farrand's son and members of the Kerr family within the village, including a grist mill, a carding mill, two sawmills and a shingle mill. Additionally, Farran built a general store and a power station near the rapids.

Joseph Kerr, a newcomer from Ireland, was also a mill owner who went on to become very prosperous. Joseph, along with his brothers, George, Thomas and William, owned two sawmills, a grits mill, farms and a large general store with branches a Wales and Aultsville. All the brothers were active in politics. Joseph Kerr served the community as Reeve and both Joseph and George were active at the provincial level. The huge Kerr home, built on a corner lot that included a store on the east side, was often referred to as "Buckingham palace".

The success of the Farran and Kerr operations attracted a number of other businesses to the area and by the mid 1800s the little community boasted a population of around 300 and a post office had been established. The mills were located along the shoreline at the south end of the village. The business district was situated further north with most of the businesses located either on Mill Street, which ran north from the Farran Mills, or on the north side of the highway, Known locally as Main Street. The community was bounded on each side by property owned by the Kerr brothers. In 1847, a small canal and lock was opened in the village to allow vessels to navigate the rapids in the village easily. Sometime in the 1850s, the Grand Trunk railway was built through the village and shortly after, a railway station and stationmaster's dwelling were built in the community.

At the end of the nineteenth century, the village contained two hotels; the Baker Stage Coach Inn and a second hotel run by a man named Edward Denney. At this time, the village also boasted a bakery, a millinery shop, and a couple of taverns on top of the preexisting mills. Two general stores were in operation, as well as a blacksmith shop, tinsmith, livery stable and a marble works.

Farran's Point was home to two churches; a Roman Catholic church called St. Francis of Assisi Church, and St. John's Presbyterian Church. St. John's church was established around the 1870s; this church was a donation from C. C. Farran (son or grandson of the first C. C. Farran). Formerly, the building that became the church was a stagecoach stop located west of the village which was moved into Farran's Point. St. John's served multiple denominations as it was the only church in the town.

In conjunction with the construction of the Saint Lawrence Seaway Project that started in 1954, the Moses-Saunders Power Project was also built. When construction of these structures was completed, inundation began on July 1, 1958 and resulted in the formation of an artificial widening and deepening in the river which was named Lake St. Lawrence. Inundation of the river caused a dozen villages including Farran's Point, now collectively known as "The Lost Villages", to be flooded.
