= United Counties of Stormont, Dundas and Glengarry =

County in Ontario, Canada

Stormont, Dundas and Glengarry
- United counties (upper-tier)
- United Counties of Stormont, Dundas and Glengarry
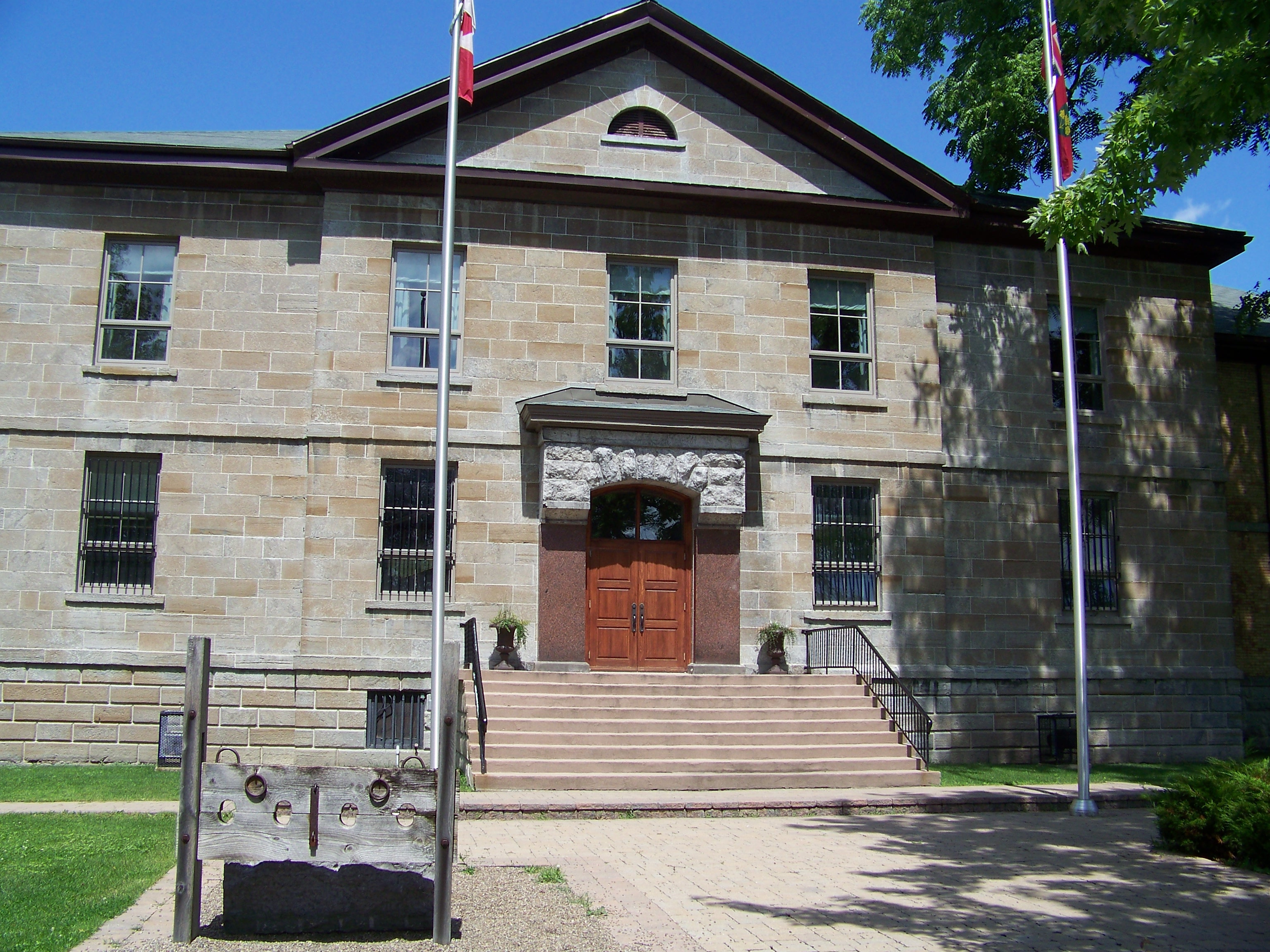
- Historic County Courthouse and offices in Cornwall

- Coat of arms

- Location of Stormont, Dundas and Glengarry United Counties
- Coordinates: 45°10′N 74°57′W
- Country: Canada
- Province: Ontario
- Region: Eastern Ontario
- Established: 1850
- County seat: Cornwall
- Municipalities: List: North Dundas; North Glengarry; North Stormont; South Dundas; South Glengarry; South Stormont

Government
  - Warden: Martin Lang

Area
  - Land: 3,235.54 km^{2} (1,249.25 sq mi)
  - Census div.: 3,308.85 km^{2} (1,277.55 sq mi)
- Land area excludes Cornwall and Akwesasne

Population (2021)
  - Total: 66,792
  - Density: 20.6/km^{2} (53/sq mi)
  - Census div.: 114,637
  - Census div. density: 34.6/km^{2} (90/sq mi)
- Total excludes Cornwall and Akwesasne
- Time zone: UTC-5 (EST)
  - Summer (DST): UTC-4 (EDT)
- Website: www.sdg.on.ca

The United Counties of Stormont, Dundas and Glengarry (SDG) is a county and census division in the Canadian province of Ontario, that comprises three historical counties. The county's administrative office is located within the City of Cornwall, which, together with the Mohawk Nation of Akwesasne, is geographically within the county but administered independently.

The United Counties of SDG borders Quebec to the east and New York in the United States to the south. The sovereign Mohawk Nation of Akwesasne straddles both borders, thus including territory partly within Ontario, Quebec and New York.

== History ==
The area along the Saint Lawrence River had been settled by indigenous peoples for thousands of years. About 2,000 years ago, the Point Peninsula complex people built earthen mounds, such as those at Serpent Mounds Park and Cameron's Point. They were gradually replaced about 1000–1300 AD by the Owasco people, who had migrated northward. They practised a more settled form of agriculture.

These people are believed to have developed into the Iroquoian-speaking people, of which the St. Lawrence Iroquoians are identified as having settled along the river valley of the same name. They spoke Laurentian, practised agriculture, and built fortified villages, such as those visited and described by explorer Jacques Cartier. They were a group distinct from the Iroquois Five Nations based in present-day New York. Historians believe the Mohawk Iroquois pushed out or destroyed the St. Lawrence Iroquoians by 1600 and used the uninhabited territory as a hunting and trapping ground. In the 17th and early 18th century, some settled at Kahnawake, south of Montreal.

In the late 1750s, some 30 Mohawk families who had converted to Christianity, who had previously lived at Kahnawake, founded Akwesasne further West (upriver) in what would become Ontario. As of 2019, Akwesasne was the largest Mohawk territory in Canada, with a population of about 12,000 people.

Though accounts suggest Europeans filtered into the area and had lived in poorly documented, unofficial and widely scattered settlements for some time, the first formally documented European settlement was established in 1784 by United Empire Loyalists, primarily from the former British colony of New York. After the war for American independence, former colonial soldiers loyal to the Crown and other disbanded soldiers and their families began to settle at the site of Cornwall, then called New Johnstown. Many of the new arrivals were of German origin, with the town being named for Johnstown, New York where many came from.

The main group were led by Lieutenant-Colonel Sir John Johnson and were soldiers from the First Battalion King's Royal Regiment of New York and a contingent of the 84th Royal Highland Emigrants. Following the success of rebellious colonists in the American Revolution, many of those afraid for their lives or uncomfortable in the newly independent United States would become "United Empire Loyalists", as they were later called, and migrated to Canada. The British government helped them settle throughout the Canadas as a reward for their loyalty and to compensate them for their losses in the United States. One of the chief settlement regions was the St Lawrence River valley, from Kingston to Cornwall, which would later be known as "loyalist country".

They founded a settlement on the site formerly called Pointe Maligne by French colonists and renamed it "Royal Settlement #2", and, later, "New Johnstown". It was later renamed Cornwall by the British for the Duke of Cornwall by proclamation of Prince George, and in 1834 the town became one of the first incorporated municipalities in the British colony of Upper Canada. The construction of the Cornwall Canal between 1834 and 1842 accelerated the community's development into a regional and industrial economic "capital" for a growing hinterland of towns and villages.

The united counties comprises six of the original eight Royal Townships of Upper Canada: Lancaster, Charlottenburgh, Cornwall, Osnabruck, Williamsburgh and Matilda. These six townships were divided into 12 a few years after their creation. Each set of four townships became one of three separate counties: Lancaster, Charlottenburgh, Kenyon and Lochiel became Glengarry County, Cornwall, Osnabruck, Finch and Roxborough became Stormont County, and Williamsburgh, Matilda, Winchester and Mountain became Dundas County. The three counties were later amalgamated to form the United Counties of Stormont, Dundas and Glengarry.

In 1846, the population of Cornwall was about 1,600 and there were many brick and stone houses as well as a stone courthouse and jail, but the surrounding region contained a large number of towns that had grown from what were, originally, quite isolated settlements. Several government offices were located in Cornwall, but there was little industry, except for a foundry and two tanneries. However, many independent tradesmen of various types worked in the "city" and in the surrounding counties. Other town-based amenities in Cornwall included two bank agencies, eight taverns and a ladies' school.

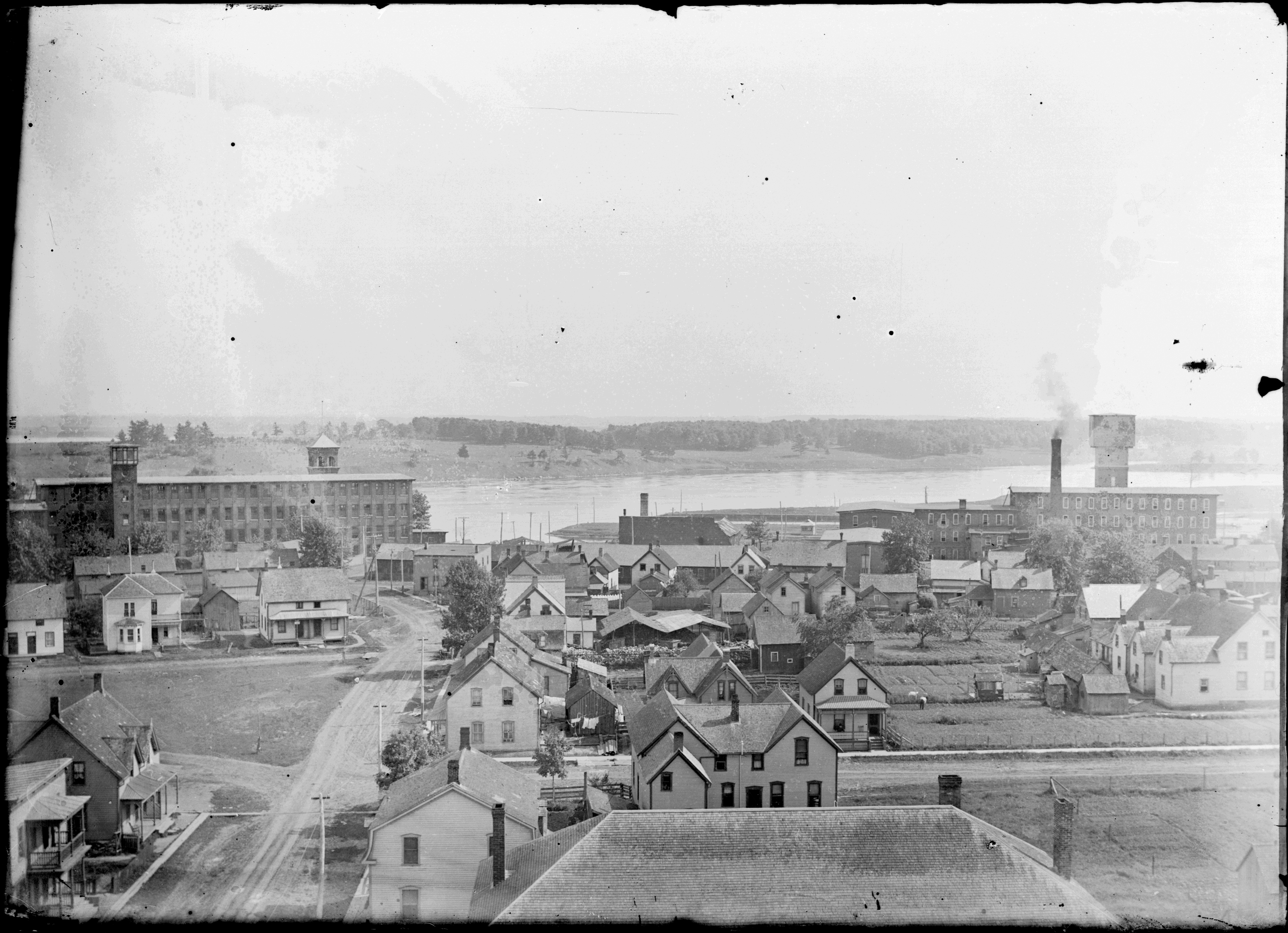
Cornwall, circa 1900

Canal and lock construction in the late 1800s and early 1900s brought work and international business. Railway connections, beginning in the 1850s, provided connections between Cornwall and local communities in the counties that required access to public services in Cornwall itself, such as high schools and medical services, and helped cement Cornwall's position as a regional centre for a large, rapidly expanding and increasingly populated rural hinterland . The network of villages and towns surrounding Cornwall helped make the city a local entrepot for business, commerce, media and services, and the development of communication and travel networks turned what was originally a series of isolated towns into a cohesive economic and social region.

Situated on the southern border of the counties along the St. Lawrence River, west of Cornwall, were several smaller communities that no longer exist. Now known as the Lost Villages, the communities were permanently flooded in 1958 during the construction of the St. Lawrence Seaway as the massive Moses-Saunders Power Dam at the western end of the city required a reservoir. The villages were flooded when it was filled. Much of the Cornwall region's local character also changed at this time.

=== Ethnic history ===
Despite being a rural area, the United Counties have had a remarkably complex cultural history. Because of the usefulness of the St Lawrence river valley for transportation and the region's general fertility and access to water, the river basin is a natural corridor for people and goods, migration and conquest, and many groups who have traveled through have also settled there.

Prior to European colonization, the Mohawks and Six Nations Iroquois settled, raided and battled through the St. Lawrence valley. The French and British fought over the waterway, often both using and being used by native allies in highly complex economic and political competition. During the War of 1812, a generation after thirteen of the British colonies declared independence and became the United States, the region became a battleground between Americans and the people who would become today's Canadians. Formally founded under colonial British control to be a new home for refugees from the American Revolution, it remained a home for refugees and migrants for much of its history.

Early settlement of the region is largely undocumented, although oral histories and early accounts suggest that European settlers, traders and farmers lived in the area long before formal state recognition, and had been interacting with and/or mixing with the native population for most of that time.

The post-contact regional population was a mixture of French Canadian, Ojibwe and Mohawk residents. To this mix was added an influx of American English Loyalists and refugees from the Thirteen Colonies (now the United States), other French Canadian and Acadian migrants and, later, poor Scottish and Irish immigrants and refugees who arrived from overseas and from other parts of Canada. These different groups mixed and integrated over time, with family names and histories reflecting a blending of different backgrounds that became typical of Eastern Ontario.

Smaller but nevertheless impressive contributions in the region were made by a host of other migrants, from Jewish traders, craftsmen and merchants, to Eastern European refugees and even a significant body of former slaves. Many of these stories go unreported in standard histories, which pass over the remarkable history of migration in the region. One good example is the story of John Baker who died in Cornwall in 1871 at the age of 93. Born in Lower Canada, he was said to be the last Canadian born into slavery, and had been an active soldier in the War of 1812, fighting in both Canada and Europe. Slavery was ended in the colony of Upper Canada in stages, beginning in 1793 when importing slaves was banned, and culminating in 1819 when Upper Canada Attorney-General John Robinson declared all slaves in the colony to be freed, making Upper Canada the first place in the British Empire - and, in fact, the world - to unequivocally move towards formal abolition of chattel slavery. Most of these former slaves settled and integrated into the same communities where they were freed. By 1833, this process of liberation had succeeded throughout the Empire and all slaves in the British Empire were free. The British Empire was the first major state in world history to abolish slavery, and Ontario was the place where this process first bore fruit. John Baker, the last slave to be born into slavery in Canada, died in Cornwall.

"Canada" had been stripped from France after the Seven Years' War, and this included roughly the areas now covered by the Canadian provinces of Quebec and Ontario. In the aftermath of the American Revolution, the British authorities split the Province of Canada in 1791 into two, Upper Canada for English settlers fleeing persecution in the United States and Lower Canada for the French (later, Ontario and Quebec, respectively). This was designed to accommodate Loyalists who had fled post-war reprisals and persecution in the new United States, though the 5,000 English-speaking settlers in the Eastern Township of Quebec were allowed to stay in the French-speaking area and many French settlers moved into Ontario, especially into Eastern Ontario. Along with the area's original inhabitants, this made the area a patchwork of intersecting ethnicities that would ultimately end up blending.

Cornwall and the surrounding area, originally called "Royal Settlement #2" and then "New Jamestown", was initially a rough place, and was largely left to its own devices by all levels of government. According to contemporaneous reports, this bred a local culture of intense self-reliance. Adding to this initial history of pragmatic entrepreneurialism, beginning very early with the founding of the city, provincial and federal governments have typically neglected the area, treating it as little more than a transit corridor, an attitude which reached its apogee when the St. Lawrence Seaway was smashed through the region in the late 1950s, allowing the Canadian and American national economies to permanently bypass the region, leaving it once again to become something of an economic backwater. From the beginning to the present day, those who remained in the region tended to be those who had the fortitude and energy to survive on their own, with little useful outside assistance.

The original 516 settlers arrived in Royal Township #2 with minimal supplies and faced years of hard work and possible starvation. Upon their departure from military camps in Montreal, Pointe Claire, Saint Anne, and Lachine in the fall of 1784, Loyalists were given a tent, one month's worth of food rations, clothes, and agricultural provisions by regiment commanders. They were promised one cow for every two families, an axe, and other necessary tools in the near future. For the next three years, bateaux (boat) crews delivered rations to the township, after which residents were left to fend for themselves.

The region's energetic spirit of enterprise and fortitude was well known in the 19th century. David Thompson, the Welsh-Canadian explorer who mapped the Far West and was called the greatest land geographer in history, drew many of his traveling companions from Cornwall's rural hinterland, drawing on Scottish and native settlers, and himself lived in Williamstown.

More recently, Cornwall has seen an increase in the arrival of new immigrants, who tend to integrate and often fare better than immigrants in other parts of the country.

== Administrative divisions ==
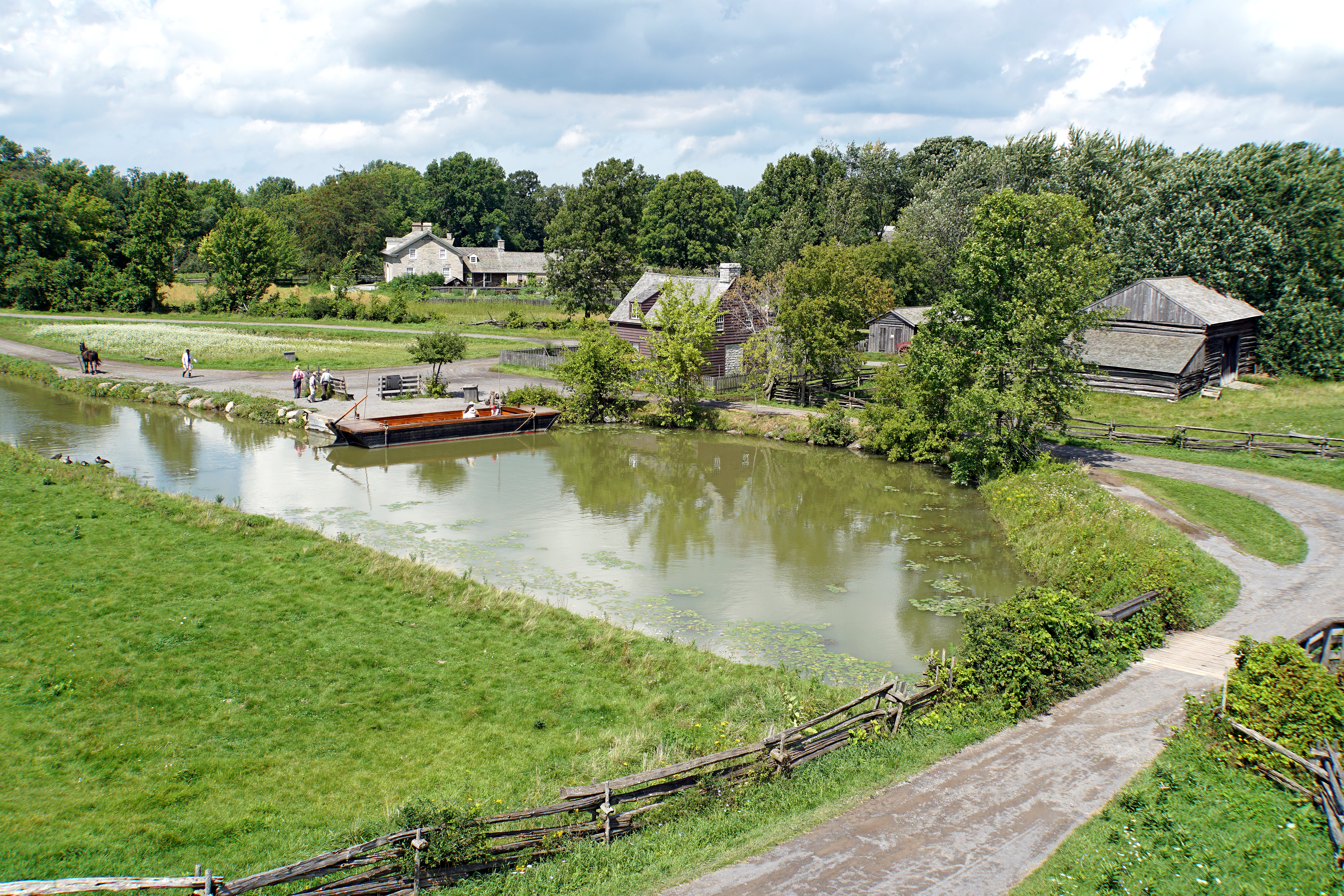
Upper Canada Village, near Morrisburg, South Dundas

The City of Cornwall and Akwesasne First Nations reserve are within the Stormont, Dundas, Glengarry census division but is independent of the county.

Municipality:

- South Dundas

Townships:

- North Dundas
- North Glengarry
- North Stormont
- South Glengarry
- South Stormont

=== Historical counties ===
- Dundas County
- Glengarry County
- Stormont County

== Demographics ==
As a census division in the 2021 Census of Population conducted by Statistics Canada, the United Counties of Stormont, Dundas and Glengarry had a population of 114,637 living in 48,692 of its 50,802 total private dwellings, a change of 1% from its 2016 population of 113,448. With a land area of 3,308.85 km^{2} (1,277.55 sq mi), it had a population density of 34.6/km^{2} (89.7/sq mi) in 2021.

As an upper-tier municipality that excludes the City of Cornwall, the United Counties had a population of 64,824 living in 25,580 of its 27,018 total dwellings in the 2011 Census, a 0.7% change from its 2006 population of 64,374. With a land area of 3,247.32 km^{2} (1,253.80 sq mi), it had a population density of 20.0/km^{2} (51.7/sq mi) in 2011.

Canada census – United Counties of Stormont, Dundas and Glengarry (census division)* community profile

	2021	2016	2011
Population	114,637 (+1.0% from 2016)	113,429 (+2.0% from 2011)	111,164 (0.7% from 2006)
Land area	3,308.85 km^{2} (1,277.55 sq mi)	3,309.87 km^{2} (1,277.95 sq mi)	3,308.84 km^{2} (1,277.55 sq mi)
Population density	34.6/km^{2} (90/sq mi)	34.3/km^{2} (89/sq mi)	33.6/km^{2} (87/sq mi)
Median age	47.6 (M: 46.4, F: 48.8)	47.1 (M: 46.1, F: 48.1)	45.6 (M: 44.9, F: 46.3)
Private dwellings	50,802 (total) 48,692 (occupied)	50,455 (total) 47,829 (occupied)	48,290 (total)
Median household income	$73,500	$59,526

Notes: *Includes the City of Cornwall while excludes the incompletely enumerated portion of the Mohawk Nation of Akwesasne.
References: 2021 2016 2011

Historical census populations – United Counties of Stormont, Dundas and Glengarry

Year	Pop.	±%
1921	62,961	—
1931	67,288	+6.9%
1941	75,847	+12.7%
1951	81,978	+8.1%
1956	92,123	+12.4%
1961	94,246	+2.3%

Year	Pop.	±%
1966	94,837	+0.6%
1971	97,239	+2.5%
1976	98,950	+1.8%
1981	101,127	+2.2%
1986	102,262	+1.1%
1991	107,841	+5.5%

Year	Pop.	±%
1996	111,301	+3.2%
2001	109,522	−1.6%
2006	110,399	+0.8%
2011	111,164	+0.7%
2016	113,429	+2.0%
2021	114,637	+1.1%

Population counts are not adjusted for boundary changes. Includes Cornwall while excludes census data for incompletely enumerated Indian reserves after 1991.
Source: Statistics Canada

== Provincial and Federal Politics ==
Most of the United Counties, with the exception of North Glengarry, constitutes the federal and provincial electoral district of Stormont—Dundas—South Glengarry. North Glengarry is part of the electoral district of Glengarry—Prescott—Russell. Both districts are currently represented federally by Conservative MP Eric Duncan and Liberal MP Francis Drouin, and provincially by Conservative MPP Nolan Quinn and Liberal MPP Amanda Simard in Glengarry—Prescott—Russell.

== Counties Council ==
The United Counties is currently governed by the Counties Council, which is composed of the mayors and deputy mayors of each municipality. The Counties Council is headed by the Warden, a council member who is elected annually by the other council members.

=== History of the Counties Council ===
From 1792 to 1849, the counties of Stormont, Dundas, and Glengarry were all part of the Eastern District. Until 1841, the administrative and judicial affairs of each district were overseen by the magistrates in Quarter Sessions (local justices in the district). District councils were created across the province (then Canada West) in 1841 by the District Councils Act; the system came into effect the following year. Wardens were appointed by the Governor of the province. Each municipality elected one person to serve on the council, or two people if the number of voters in the municipality exceeded 300. Elections were held annually with one-third of the council retiring at the end of each year. The District Councils Act was repealed in Canada West in 1849 and replaced by the Municipal Corporations Act, also known as the Baldwin Act. This act created the two-tier municipal system that is still used today. It united the counties of Stormont, Dundas, and Glengarry into one corporate body and created the Counties Council.

=== List of Wardens ===
Wardens of SDG (1842-1940)
Year	Warden	Municipality
1842-1849	Alexander Fraser	Eastern District
1850	Dr. Daniel E. McIntyre	Charlottenburg Twp.
1851	William Mattice	Cornwall Town
1852	Samuel Ault	Osnabruck Twp.
1853	Jacob Brouse	Matilda Twp.
1854	Alexander McDonell	Lochiel Twp.
1855	William Colquhoun	Osnabruck Twp.
1856	Donald A. McDonald	Lochiel Twp.
1857	Alexander McDougall	Cornwall Town
1858	William Elliot	Iroquois Village
1859	James McDonell	Kenyon Twp.
1860	George McDonell	Roxborough Twp.
1861	Alexander G. McDonell	Morrisburg Village
1862	James Craig	Charlottenburg Twp.
1863	Alexander McIntosh	Roxborough Twp.
1864	Philip Carman	Iroquois Village
1865	James Fraser	Kenyon Twp.
1866	A. James Cockburn	Finch Twp.
1867	Dr. Asaph B. Sherman	Williamsburg Twp.
1868	Archibald McNab	Lochiel Twp.
1869	Angus Bethune	Cornwall Town
1870	David Rae	Winchester Twp.
1871	Peter Kennedy	Kenyon Twp.
1872	John G. Snetsinger	Cornwall Twp.
1873	Mahlon Ford Beach	Winchester Twp.
1874	A. E. Rae	Lancaster Twp.
1875	John Brown	Roxborough Twp.
1876	Adam Harkness	Matilda Twp.
1877	James Clark	Kenyon Twp.
1878	William Mack	Cornwall Town
1879	Dr. Theodore F. Chamberlain	Morrisburg Village
1880	Duncan A. McDonald	Lochiel Twp.
1881	Isaiah R. Ault	Osnabruck Twp.
1882	James Dickey	Williamsburg Twp.
1883	A. J. Grant	Charlottenburg Twp.
1884	Finlay D. McNaughton	Finch Twp.
1885	William McKenzie	Morrisburg Village
1886	Donald A. McArthur	Alexandria Town
1887	Francis Anderson	Osnabruck Twp.
1888	Jeremiah F. Gibbons	Morrisburg Village
1889	Peter A. Stewart	Lochiel Twp.
1890	George Kerr	Osnabruck Twp.
1891	Thomas McDonald	Morrisburg Village
1892	Alexander A. Stewart	Kenyon Twp.
1893	John Bennett	Roxborough Twp.
1894	Thomas Hamilton	Winchester Twp.
1895	Donald McNaughton	Lancaster Village
1896	Donald McDonald	Cornwall Twp.
1897	John H. Meikle	Williamsburg Twp.
1898	Duncan C. McRae	Lancaster Twp.
1899	James T. Kirkpatrick	Cornwall Twp.
1900	Thomas S. Edwards	Matilda Twp.
1901	Alexander D. McRae	Kenyon Twp.
1902	Hugh McMillan	Finch Twp.
1903	Michael J. Casselman	Williamsburg Twp.
1904	John Ban Snyder	Lancaster Twp.
1905	James L. Groves	Cornwall Twp.
1906	Jeremiah F. Cass	Winchester Twp.
1907	Captain Hugh A. Cameron	Charlottenburg Twp.
1908	Edward O'Callaghan	Cornwall Town
1909	Robert Fraser	Winchester Twp.
1910	Murdoch McRae	Kenyon Twp.
1911	George L. McLean	Finch Village
1912	Malcolm S. Beckstead	Williamsburg Twp.
1913	David Robertson	Lochiel Twp.
1914	James William McLeod	Cornwall Twp.
1915	William G. Timmins	Mountain Twp.
1916	George E. Clark	Charlottenburg Twp.
1917	Duncan A. McNaughton	Finch Village
1918	William J. Fisher	Winchester Village
1919	Alexander H. Robertson	Maxville Village
1920	David Dunbar	Osnabruck Twp.
1921	Wesley Hamilton	Chesterville Village
1922	James A. Sangster	Lancaster Twp.
1923	Charles C. Munro	Roxborough Twp.
1924	George S. Smyth	Matilda Twp.
1925	Allan Campbell	Lochiel Twp.
1926	Robert C. Bogart	Finch Twp.
1927	Charles F. Marselis	Williamsburg Twp.
1928	Angus A. Macdonell	Charlottenburg Twp.
1929	Glenn A. Shaver	Osnabruck Twp.
1930	Edward Strader	Iroquois Village
1931	Dr. J. Howard Munro	Maxville Village
1932	Henry C. Nugent	Finch Twp.
1933	Howard H. Nesbitt	Winchester Twp.
1934	John D. McDonald	Lancaster Twp.
1935	George L. McIntosh	Roxborough Twp.
1936	Arthur Flynn	Morrisburg Village
1937	J. Roger McLachlan	Lancaster Village
1938	Wallace Gallinger	Osnabruck Twp.
1939	Robert Bryan	Mountain Twp.
1940	Robert McNaught	Charlottenburg Twp.

Wardens of SDG (1941-Present)
Year	Warden	Municipality
1941	John L. McDonald	Cornwall Twp.
1942	Alfred Deeks	Matilda Twp.
1943	Donald B. McDonald	Lochiel Twp.
1944	Gladstone McLean	Finch Village
1945	Oscar Becksted	Williamsburg Twp.
1946	John D. McPherson	Alexandria Twp.
1947	Kenzie MacGillivray	Finch Twp.
1948	Fred H. Broder	Morrisburg Village
1949	James A. McArthur	Lancaster Village
1950	John D. Ferguson	Roxborough Twp.
1951	Harold E. Durant	Winchester Twp.
1952	T. Scott Fraser	Lancaster Twp.
1953	J. Herbert Maginnis	Osnabruck Twp.
1954	Lloyd C. Davis	Iroquois Village
1955	John McLennan	Charlottenburg Twp.
1956	H. H. Ouderkirk	Finch Village
1957	Charles McMillan	Chesterville Village
1958	Allan C. Vallance	Kenyon Twp.
1959	W. S. Fraser	Roxborough Twp.
1960	John M. Fader	Winchester Village
1961	James N. Fitzgerald	Maxville Village
1962	Robert Smith	Finch Village
1963	Mahlon Zeron	Matilda Twp.
1964	Lloyd McHugh	Alexandria Town
1965	Charles E. Blair	Roxborough Twp.
1966	Donald Kyle	Williamsburg Twp.
1967	Archibald MacDonell	Charlottenburg Twp.
1968	James A. Zeran	Osnabruck Twp.
1969	Cecil MacNabb	Winchester Twp.
1970	Alexander McNaughton	Lancaster Twp.
1971	Lynden S. Hough	Finch Village
1972	Carlton F. McInnis	Morrisburg Village
1973	Gerard Massie	Lochiel Twp.
1974	Harold Brown	Cornwall Twp.
1975	John C. Whittker	Williamsburg Twp.
1976	William J. Cumming	Lancaster Village
1977	Elwin Waldroff	Osnabruck Twp.
1978	Ewatt Simms	Mountain Twp.
1979	Hubert Quart	Maxville Village
1980	George S. Cooper	Matilda Twp.
1981	George A. Crites	Roxborough Twp.
1982	Hugh McIntyre	Kenyon Twp.
1983	John C. Cleary	Cornwall Twp.
1984	Ewen J. McDonald	Charlottenburg Twp.
1985	William D. Dillabough	Williamsburg Twp.
1986	Ralph MacKenzie	Finch Twp.
1987	Keith Fawcett	Mountain Twp.
1988	Stewart Hart	Osnabruck Twp.
1989	George E. Currier	Maxville Village
1990	Claude Cousineau	Winchester Twp.
1991	Ronald MacDonell	Lochiel Twp.
1992	James Cook	Chesterville Village
1993	John Moss	Cornwall Twp.
1994	Charles H. Sangster	Lancaster Twp.
1995	Floyd R. Dingwall	Finch Twp.
1996	Charles A. Barkley	Matilda Twp.
1997	Leslie O'Shaughnessy (Jan-Jun)	Charlottenburg Twp.
1997	Jim Bancroft (Jul-Dec)	Osnabruck Twp.
1998	Archie R. Byers	North Stormont
1999	Roger Cole	North Dundas
2000	Frank Prevost	South Glengarry
2001	Heine Bruining	South Stormont
2002	Cameron H. Martel	South Dundas
2003	Bill Hagen	North Glengarry
2004	Dennis Fife	North Stormont
2005	Alvin Runnalls	North Dundas
2006	Jim McDonell	South Glengarry
2007	Dennis Fife	North Stormont
2008	Estella Rose	North Dundas
2009	Chris McDonell	North Glengarry
2010	Bryan McGillis	South Stormont
2011	Steven Byvelds	South Dundas
2012	Ian McLeod	South Glengarry
2013	Bill McGimpsey	North Stormont
2014	Eric Duncan	North Dundas
2015	Eric Duncan	North Dundas
2016	Jamie MacDonald	North Glengarry
2017	Jim Bancroft	South Stormont
2018	Ian McLeod	South Glengarry
2019	Jamie MacDonald	North Glengarry
2020	Frank Prevost	South Glengarry
2021	Frank Prevost (Jan-Jun)	South Glengarry
2021	Allan Armstrong (Jun-Dec)	North Dundas
2022	Carma Williams	North Glengarry
2023	Tony Fraser	North Dundas
2024	Jamie MacDonald	North Glengarry
2025	Martin Lang	South Glengarry
2026	François Landry	North Stormont

== See also ==
- List of municipalities in Ontario
- Southern Ontario
- Census divisions of Ontario
- Transit Eastern Ontario operated under the authority of The North Glengarry Prescott Russell (NGPR) Transport Board
- List of townships in Ontario
- List of secondary schools in Ontario § Stormont, Dundas and Glengarry United Counties

== Sources ==
- Pringle, J. F. (1890). Lunenburgh, or the Old Eastern District. Cornwall, ON: Standard Printing House.
