= Stormont County =

County of Ontario, Canada

Coordinates: 45°10′N 74°55′W

Stormont County area 248,608 acres (1,006 km^{2}) is a county in the Canadian province of Ontario.

Stormont was created in 1792, but was settled seven years earlier in 1785. Veterans of Loyalist regiments were among the first settlers. An estimated one third of the pioneers in the county were Highlander, one third German and the rest English, Irish and Lowland Scots people.

The original territory of Stormont also included Russell County, which became a separate county in 1800.

Stormont later united with Dundas and Glengarry to form the regional government United Counties of Stormont, Dundas and Glengarry.

== Historic Townships ==
- Cornwall (SE): area 63,460 acres (257 km^{2}). Was settled in 1785 by veterans of Sir John Johnson's and other Loyalist companies. Community centres were Moulinette, north Field and Cornwall. This township is now part of South Stormont Township
- Finch (NW): Was part of Osnabruck Township until 1798. It was settled in 1785. It is named in honour of Lady Elizabeth Finch, wife of the first Earl of Mansfield. Community centres were Crysler, Berwick, Finch, and Glen Payne. The township is now part of North Stormont Township
- Osnabruck (SW): area 61,320 acres (248 km^{2}). Surveyed from 1784 to 1787, it was named from a Hanoverian town closely associated with the royal family. The township was settled in 1785 by Loyalist veterans, many of them Germans. Community Centres: Newington, Grantley, Osnabruck Centre and Wales. The township is now part of South Stormont Township.
- Roxborough (NE): Was part of Cornwall Township until 1798. It was named from the Scottish County. Community Centres were Moose Creek, Avonmore and Monckland. The township is now part of North Stormont Township.

== Sources ==
Province of Ontario -- A History 1615 to 1927 by Jesse Edgar Middleton and Fred Landon, copyright 1927, Dominion Publishing Company, Toronto

== See also ==
- List of Ontario census divisions
- The Lost Villages
- List of townships in Ontario
