= North Stormont =

Township in Ontario, Canada

- Township (lower-tier)
- Township of North Stormont
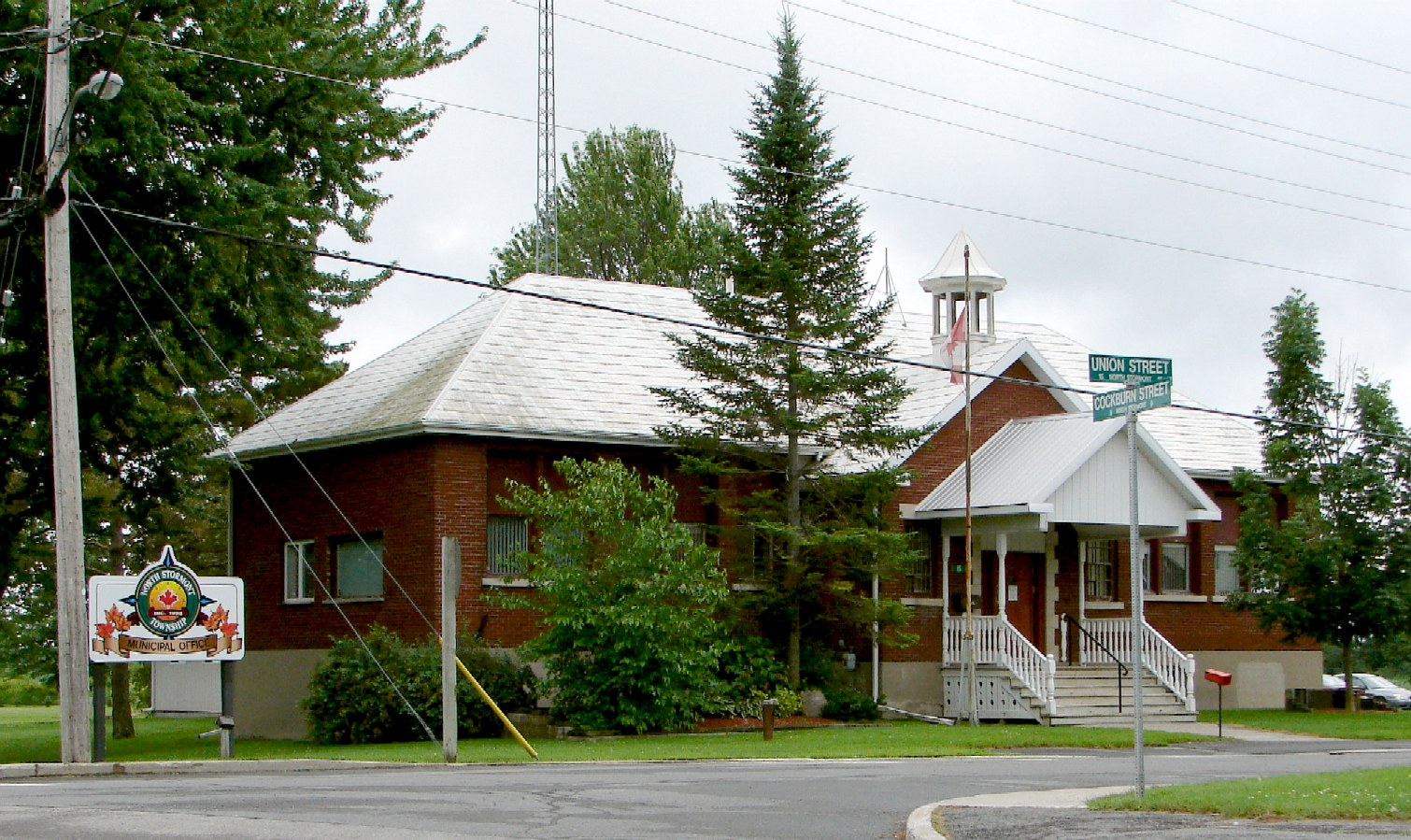
- Township office in Berwick
- Motto: A Good Place to Grow...
- Location within United Counties of Stormont, Dundas and Glengarry Location within Southern Ontario
- Coordinates: 45°13′N 75°00′W
- Country: Canada
- Province: Ontario
- County: Stormont, Dundas and Glengarry
- Formed: January 1, 1998

Government
  - Type: Township
  - Mayor: François Landry
  - Deputy Mayor: Steve Densham
  - Federal riding: Stormont—Dundas—Glengarry
  - Prov. riding: Stormont—Dundas—South Glengarry

Area
  - Total: 515.46 km^{2} (199.02 sq mi)

Population (2021)
  - Total: 7,308
  - Density: 14.2/km^{2} (37/sq mi)
- Time zone: UTC-5 (Eastern (EST))
  - Summer (DST): UTC-4 (Eastern Daylight (EDT))
- Postal code FSA: K0C
- Area codes: 613 and 343
- Website: northstormont.ca

North Stormont is a lower tier township in eastern Ontario, Canada in the United Counties of Stormont, Dundas and Glengarry.

== Communities ==
The township of North Stormont comprises a number of villages and hamlets, including the following communities:

- Finch Township: Berwick, Crysler, Finch; Cahore, Goldfield, Glenpayne
- Roxborough Township: Avonmore, Monkland, Moose Creek, Roxborough Gardens, Bloomington, Dyer, Gravel Hill, Lodi, MacDonalds Grove, McMillans Corners (partially), Sandringham, Strathmore, Tayside, Tolmies Corners, Warina, Valley Corners

The township administrative offices are located in Berwick.

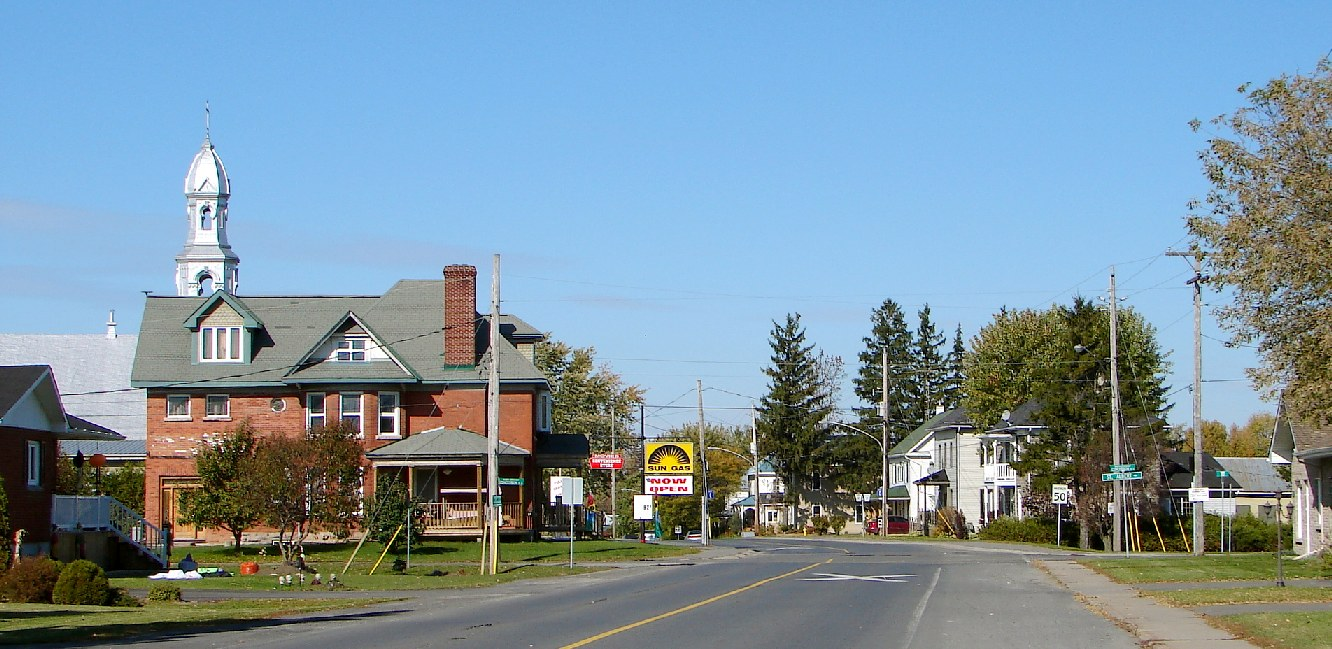
Crysler

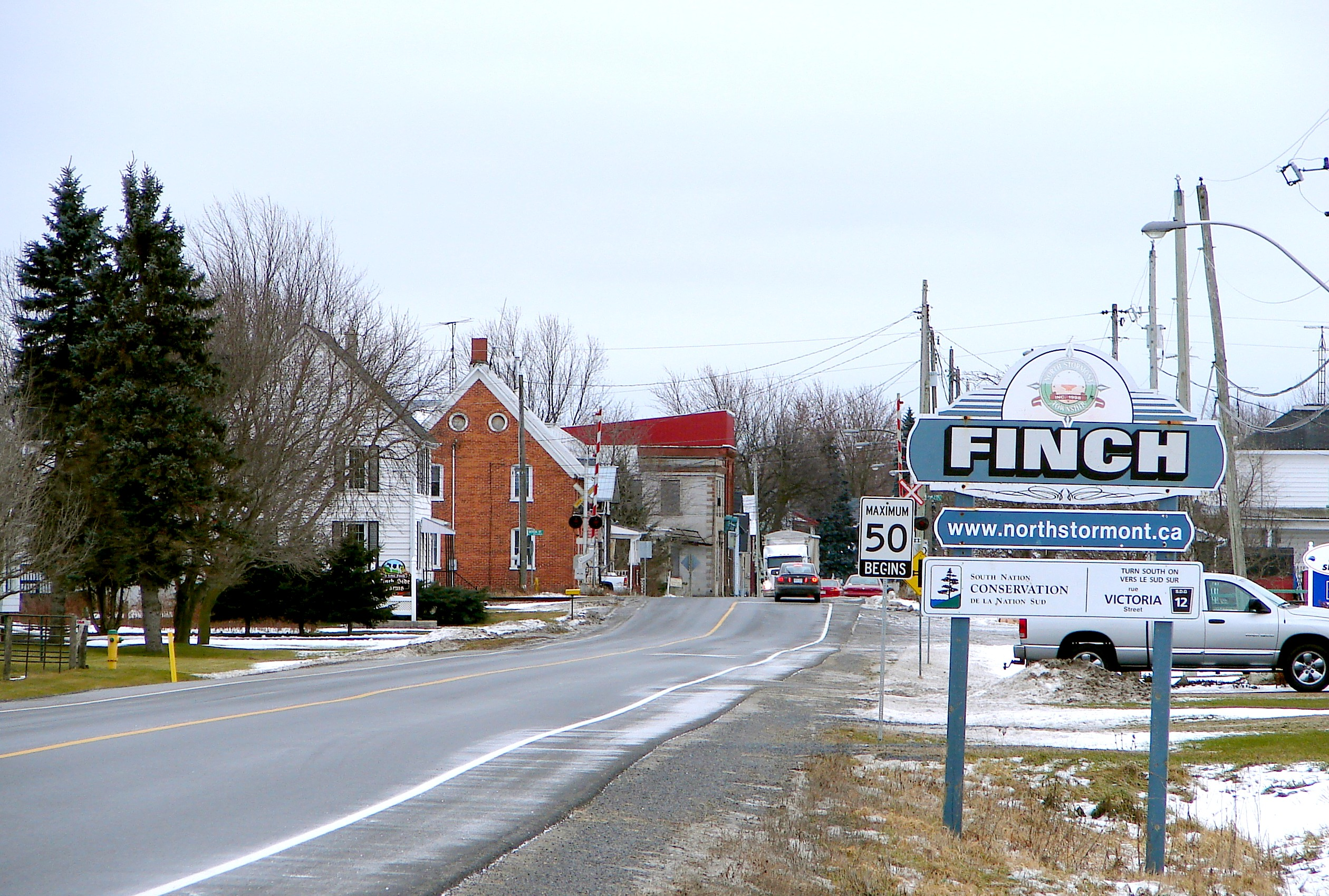
Finch

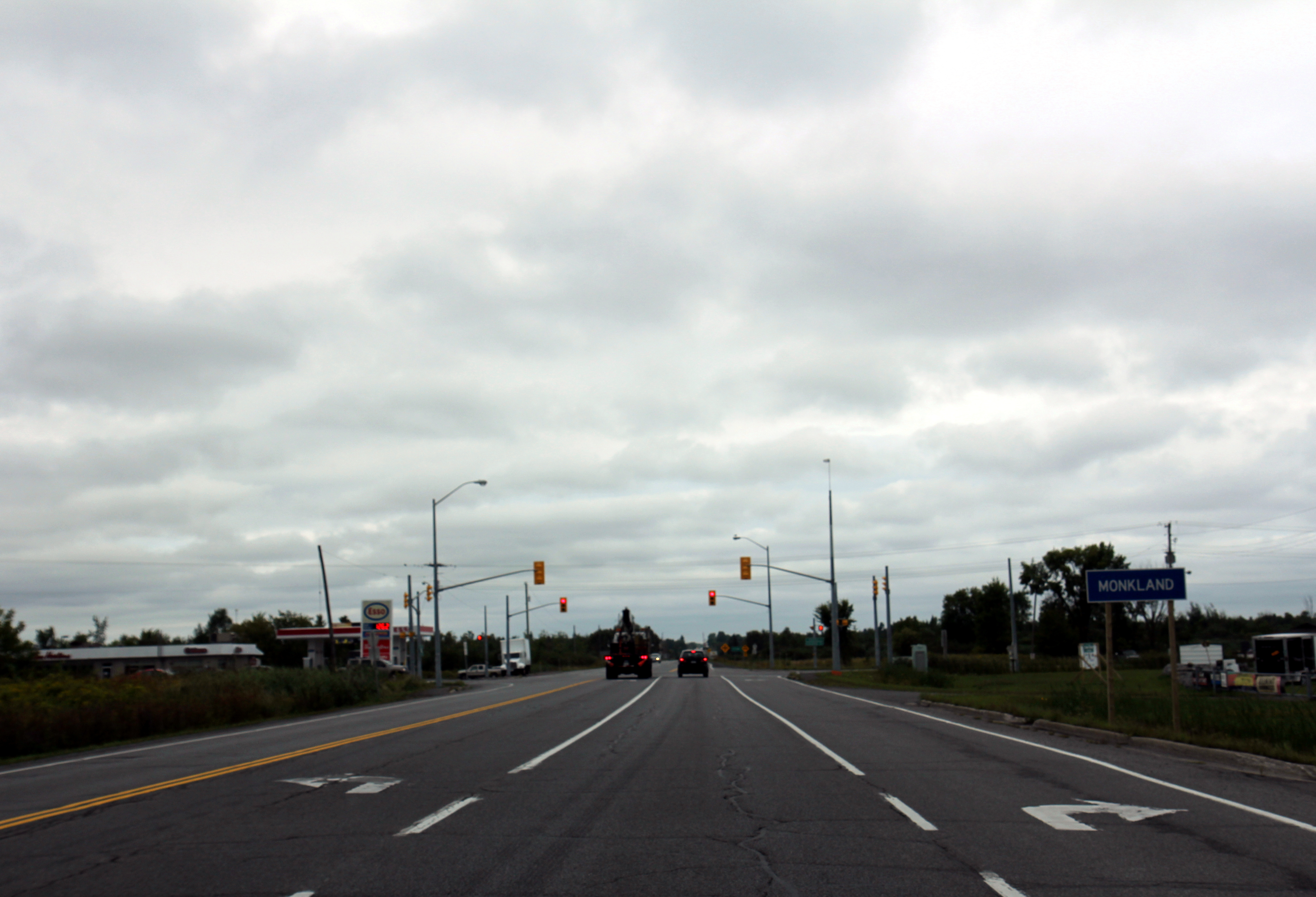
Monkland

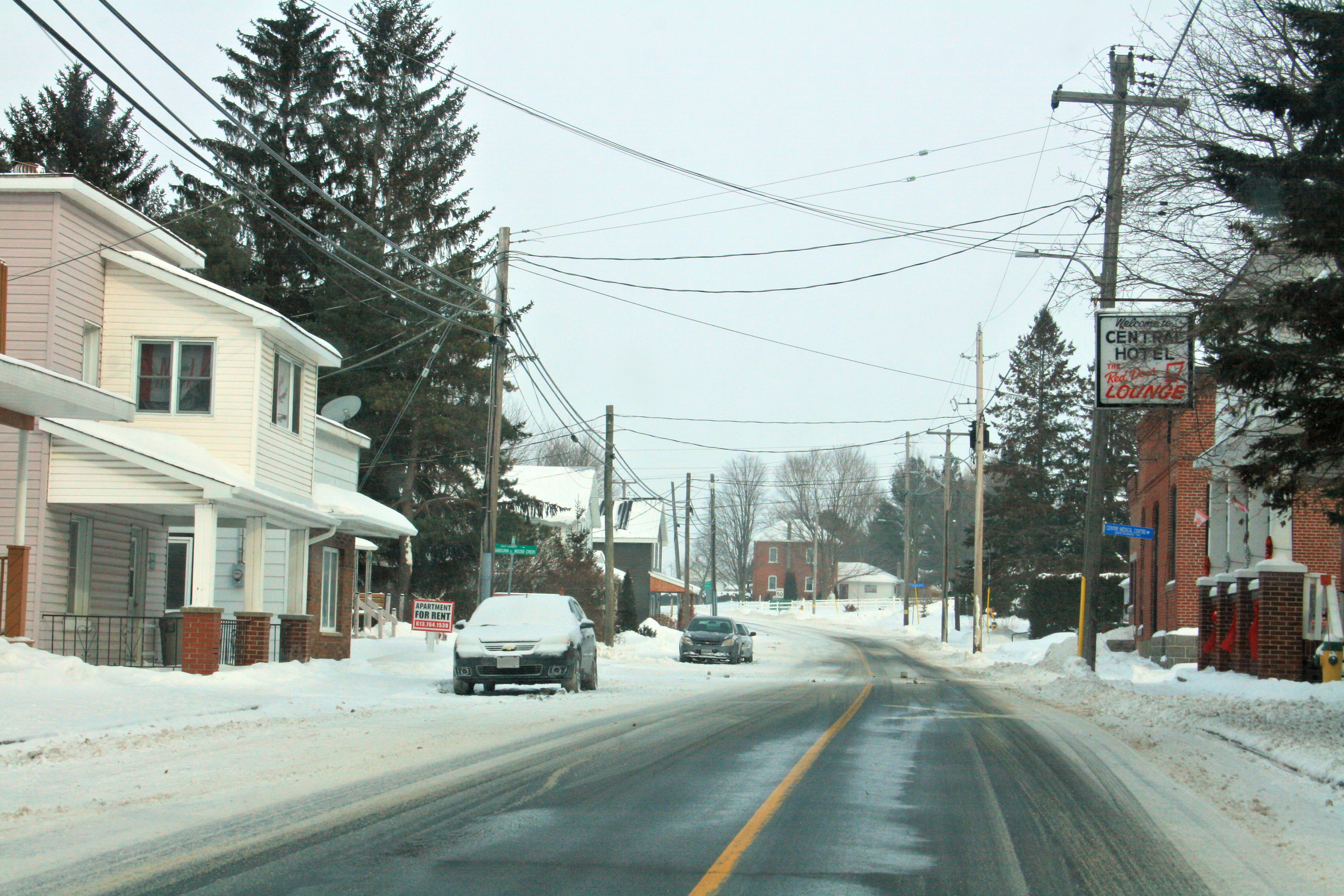
Moose Creek

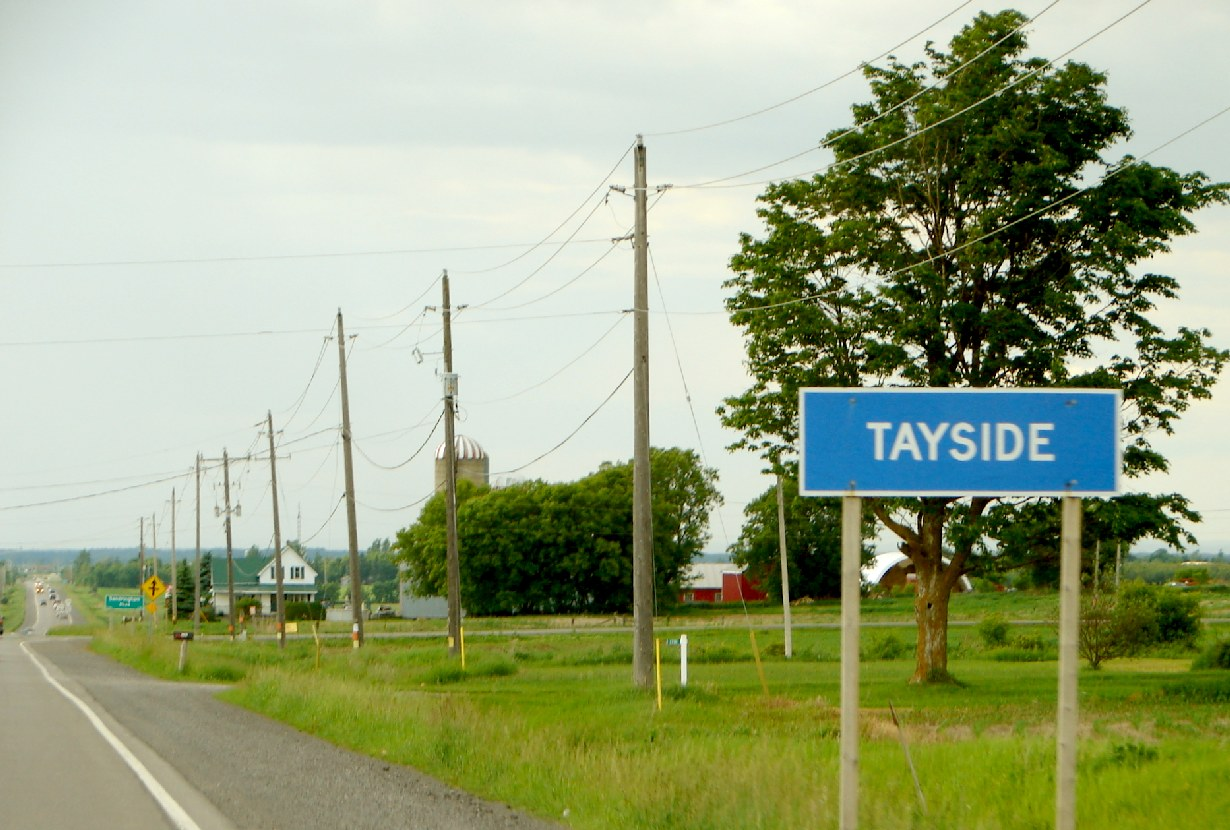
Tayside

== History ==
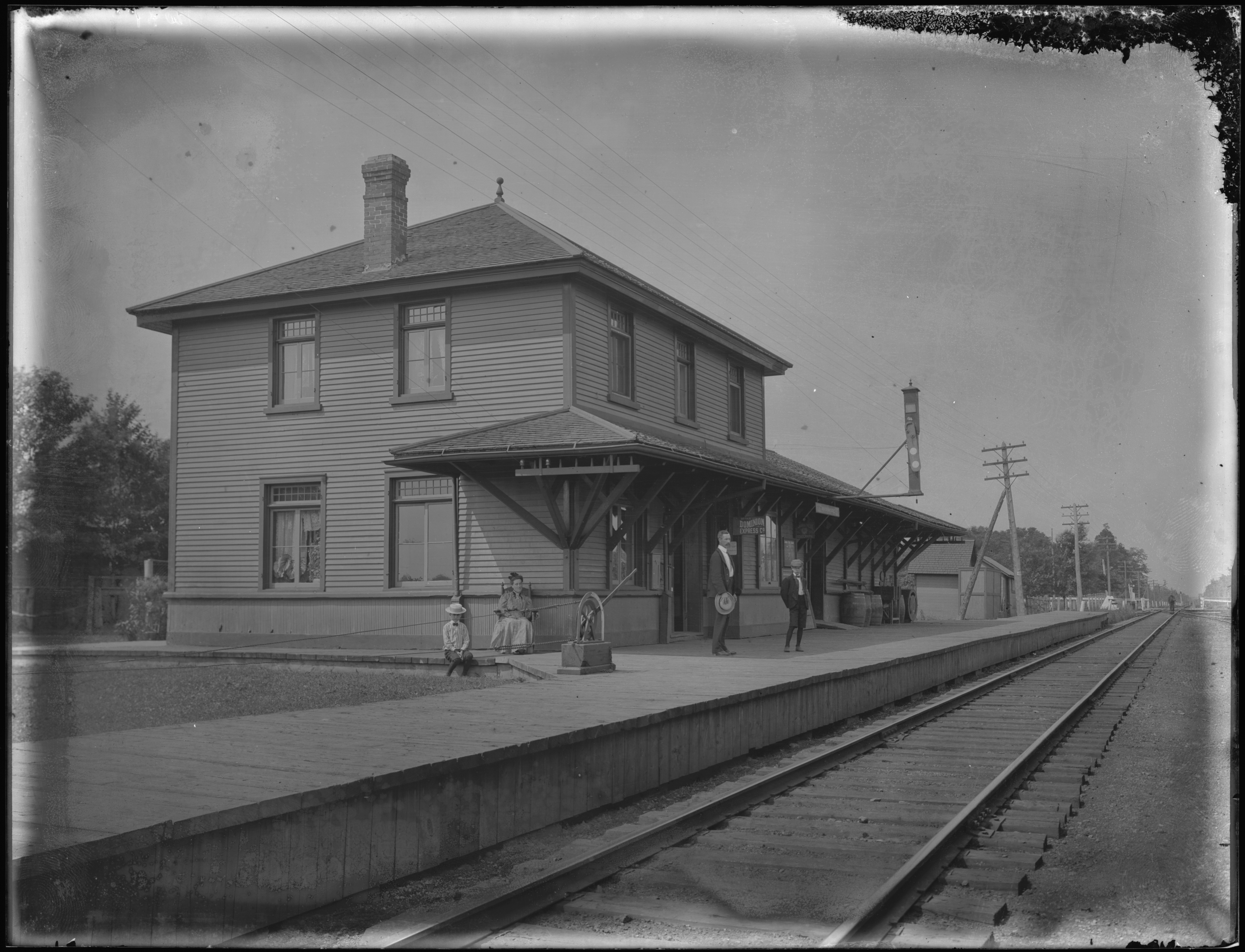
Canadian Pacific Railway Station, Avonmore, Ontario, between 1895 and 1910

Early settlement in the area began in 1785. Finch Township was originally part of the Royal Township of Osnabruck, and Roxborough Township was originally part of the Royal Township of Cornwall. Stormont County was created in 1792, and both Finch and Roxborough were separated from their southerly parents in 1798.

The hamlet of Berwick was first settled by four Cockburn brothers from Scotland in the early 19th century. Berwick became the administrative home of municipal government in the former Finch Township, incorporated January 1, 1850.

The New York and Ottawa Railway was built in 1897 and sent up to four daily passenger trains, as well as up to five daily freight trains through Berwick. The first church was built in 1883.

The township was established on January 1, 1998, with the amalgamation of the former Townships of Finch and Roxborough, along with the Village of Finch.

== Demographics ==
In the 2021 Census of Population conducted by Statistics Canada, North Stormont had a population of 7,400 living in 2,853 of its 2,949 total private dwellings, a change of 7.7% from its 2016 population of 6,873. With a land area of 515.46 km^{2} (199.02 sq mi), it had a population density of 14.4/km^{2} (37.2/sq mi) in 2021.

Canada census – North Stormont community profile

	2021	2016	2011
Population	7,308 (+6.3% from 2016)	6,873 (1.4% from 2011)	6,775 (0.1% from 2006)
Land area	515.46 km^{2} (199.02 sq mi)	515.91 km^{2} (199.19 sq mi)	515.65 km^{2} (199.09 sq mi)
Population density	14.2/km^{2} (37/sq mi)	13.3/km^{2} (34/sq mi)	13.1/km^{2} (34/sq mi)
Median age	39.6 (M: 39.2, F: 40)	41.6 (M: 41.6, F: 41.6)	40.9 (M: 40.3, F: 41.5)
Private dwellings	2,906 (total) 2,810 (occupied)	2,717 (total)	2,583 (total)
Median household income	$91,000	$76,544

Notes: 2021 data based on revised population and dwelling counts.
References: 2021 2016 2011

Historical census populations – North Stormont

Year	Pop.	±%
1986	5,748	—
1991	6,159	+7.2%
1996	6,900	+12.0%
2001	6,855	−0.7%

Year	Pop.	±%
2006	6,769	−1.3%
2011	6,775	+0.1%
2016	6,873	+1.4%
2021	7,308	+6.3%

2021 population figure based on revised count. Population amounts prior to 2001 is total of Finch TP, Roxborough TP, and Finch VL.
Source: Statistics Canada

== Railways ==
The Canadian National Railway line between Montreal and Toronto passes through North Stormont.

== Notable people ==
- Leone N. Farrell (1904–1986), biochemist and microbiologist, was born in Monkland.
- J. T. Kearns (c.1858-May 26, 1941) co-founder of Chesterville gold mine, was born in Finch township.
- Norm Macdonald (1959-2021), comedian, spent his summers growing up at the family farm between Avonmore and Monkland. Both his parents are from the area.
- Neil Macdonald (b 1957), Canadian journalist, former senior correspondent for CBC News The National, brother of Norm, spent his summers growing up at the family farm between Avonmore and Monkland. Both his parents are from the area.

== See also ==
- List of townships in Ontario
- List of francophone communities in Ontario
