= 2007 Ontario provincial by-elections =

Flag of the Canadian Province of Ontario

By-elections were held on February 8, 2007, in Ontario, Canada, to fill three vacancies in the Legislative Assembly of Ontario. By-elections were held in three electoral districts (ridings): Burlington, Markham and York South–Weston.
The by-elections resulted in York South-Weston being taken by the NDP from the Liberals, Burlington remaining Progressive Conservative and Markham being retained by the Liberals.

Since this was a by-election of the 38th Legislative Assembly of Ontario, the ridings used the same boundaries as the 2003 general election. The subsequent October 10, 2007 general election were run on new electoral district boundaries, mostly following the new federal boundaries that were in place for the 2004 and 2006 federal elections.

== Burlington electoral district ==
The Burlington by-election was called following the resignation of Progressive Conservative Member of Provincial Parliament (MPP) Cam Jackson. He resigned to make a successful run in Burlington's 2006 mayoralty election. .

Information about candidates and parties

Ontario provincial by-election, January 12, 2007: Burlington Resignation of Cam Jackson
Party	Candidate	Votes	%	±%
Progressive Conservative	Joyce Savoline	11,146	49.00	+2.85
Liberal	Joan Lougheed	9,362	41.16	–1.01
New Democratic	Cory Judson	1,309	5.76	–2.47
Green	Frank de Jong	734	3.23	+0.90
Freedom	Barry Spruce	105	0.46	–
Independent	John Turmel	89	0.39	–
Total valid votes		22,745	99.61	
Total rejected, unmarked and declined ballots		89	0.39	–0.21
Turnout		22,834	29.37	–32.14
Eligible voters		77,749		
Progressive Conservative hold		Swing		+1.93
Source: Elections Ontario

== Markham electoral district ==
The Markham by-election was called following the resignation of Liberal MPP Tony Wong. He resigned to make a successful run for one of the four York Region councillor seats in Markham's 2006 municipal election.

Information about candidates and parties

Ontario provincial by-election, February 8, 2007: Markham Resignation of Tony Wong
Party	Candidate	Votes	%	±%
Liberal	Michael Chan	9,080	49.30	–2.40
Progressive Conservative	Alex Yuan	6,426	34.89	–5.44
New Democratic	Janice Hagan	1,492	8.10	+3.02
Green	Bernadette Manning	999	5.42	+3.86
Freedom	Cathy Mckeever	159	0.86	–
Family Coalition	Patrick Redmond	135	0.73	–0.59
Libertarian	Jay Miller	127	0.69	–
Total valid votes		18,418	99.44	
Total rejected, unmarked and declined ballots		104	0.56	+0.06
Turnout		18,522	16.70	–37.19
Eligible voters		110,902		
Liberal hold		Swing		+1.52
Source: Elections Ontario

== York South–Weston electoral district ==
The York South–Weston by-election was called following the resignation of Liberal MPP Joe Cordiano. He stated the reason for his resignation was the need to spend more time with his family.

Information about candidates and parties.

Ontario provincial by-election, February 8, 2007: York South—Weston Resignation of Joseph Cordiano
Party	Candidate	Votes	%	±%
New Democratic	Paul Ferreira	8,146	43.33	+24.04
Liberal	Laura Albanese	7,831	41.44	−20.12
Progressive Conservative	Pina Martino	1,917	10.27	−4.96
Green	Mir Kamal	263	1.39	−1.06
Independent	Kevin Clarke	220	1.16	
Independent	Mohammed Choudhary	142	0.75	
Family Coalition	Mariangela Sanabria	134	0.74	−0.73
Libertarian	Nunzio Venuto	101	0.52	
Freedom	Wayne Simmons	77	0.41	
Total valid votes		18,831	100.0	
Total rejected, unmarked and declined ballots		146	0.77	
Turnout		18,977	28.62	
Eligible voters		66,308		
New Democratic gain from Liberal		Swing		+22.08
Source(s) Elections Ontario (2007). "By-Election 2007: Summary of Valid Ballots Cast for Each Candidate".

== See also ==
- List of Ontario by-elections
- 38th Legislative Assembly of Ontario
- Politics of Ontario
- List of Ontario political parties
- Premier of Ontario
- Leader of the Opposition (Ontario)
- 2007 Ontario general election
