= 38th Parliament of Ontario =

Parliamentary session of the Ontario Provincial Parliament

- Majority parliament
- Nov. 19, 2003 – Sep. 10, 2007

Parliament leaders
- Premier: Hon. Dalton McGuinty; October 23, 2003 - February 11, 2013
- Leader of the Opposition: Ernie Eves; 2003-2004
- John Tory; 2004-2007

Party caucuses
- Government: Liberal
- Opposition: Progressive Conservative
- Recognized: New Democratic (2006–2007)
- Unrecognized: New Democratic (2003–2006)

Legislative Assembly
- Speaker of the Assembly: Hon. Alvin Curling; 2003-2005
- Hon. Michael Brown; 2005-2007
- Government House leader: Dwight Duncan; October 23, 2003 — October 11, 2005
- Opposition House leader: John Baird; November 19, 2003 - March 29, 2005
- Bob Runciman; March 29, 2005 — September 10, 2007
- Members: 103 MPP seats

Sovereign
- Monarch: Elizabeth II; 6 February 1952 – present

Sessions
- 1st session November 19, 2003 – September 19, 2005
- 2nd session October 11, 2005 – June 5, 2007
← 37th	→ 39th

The 38th Legislative Assembly of Ontario was a legislature of the government of the Province of Ontario, Canada. It officially opened November 19, 2003, at Queen's Park in Toronto, and ended on June 5, 2007. The membership was set by the 2003 Ontario general election on October 2, 2003, and it changed only somewhat due to resignations and by-elections.

It was controlled by a Liberal Party majority under Premier Dalton McGuinty. The Official Opposition was the Progressive Conservative Party, led first by Ernie Eves, and later by John Tory. The speaker was Michael A. Brown.

There were two sessions of the 38th Legislature:

Session	Start	End
1st	November 19, 2003	September 19, 2005
2nd	October 11, 2005	June 5, 2007

== Timeline of the 38th Parliament of Ontario ==
- November 19, 2003: The legislature conducted a secret vote to elect the Speaker of the legislature. Liberal Party of Ontario Member of Provincial Parliament (MPP) Alvin Curling is elected as Speaker. He was the first black Speaker of the Ontario legislature.
- March 24, 2004: Dominic Agostino, Liberal MPP for Hamilton East, died suddenly of liver cancer.
- May 13, 2004: A by-election was held in Hamilton East to replace Dominic Agostino. Ontario New Democratic Party candidate Andrea Horwath defeated Liberal candidate Ralph Agostino, Mr. Agostino's brother. This win returned the NDP to 8 seats and official party status.
- August 19, 2005: Speaker Alvin Curling resigned to accept an appointment as Ambassador to the Dominican Republic.
- November 24, 2005: In a by-election, Bas Balkissoon held the seat of Scarborough-Rouge River for the Liberals.
- September 18, 2006: Joe Cordiano, Liberal MPP for York South-Weston, resigned from cabinet and the legislature, citing a desire to spend more time with family.
- September 25, 2006: Tony Wong, Liberal MPP for Markham, resigned from the legislature to make a successful bid for a seat on York Regional Council.
- September 28, 2006: Cam Jackson, Progressive Conservative MPP for Burlington, resigned from the legislature to make a successful bid for the mayoralty of Burlington.
- February 8, 2007: Three by-elections were held. Paul Ferreira won York South-Weston for the NDP (the seat was previously held by the Liberals); former Halton Region chair Joyce Savoline retained Burlington for the PCs; and Michael Chan held Markham for the Liberals.
- March 29, 2007: Tim Peterson, brother of former Ontario Premier David Peterson, left the Liberal caucus to sit as an Independent until the next election, in which he ran for the PCs.
- June 5, 2007: The 38th Parliament 2nd Session is prorogued.
- July 12, 2007: Liberal MPP Ernie Parsons resigned his seat in order to accept an appointment as Justice of the Peace.
- September 10, 2007: 38th Parliament dissolved.

== Party standings ==
Affiliation	Election	Today
Liberal Party	72	67
Progressive Conservative Party	24	24
New Democratic Party	7	10
Independent	0	1
Vacant	0	1
Total	103	
Government Majority	21	17

****	****	*	****	****	*	****	****	*	****	****	*	****	****	****	*	****	****	*	****
****	****	*	****	****	*	****	****	*	****	****	*	****	****	****	*	****	****	*	****	****
****	****	*	****	****	*	****	****	*	****	****	*	****	****	****	*	****	****	*	****	****
****	****	*	****	****	*	****	LO	*	****	****	*	****	L	****	*	****	****	*	****	****	****
****
****
****
****	****	*	****	****	*	****	P	*	****	****	*	****	****	*	****	****	*	****	****
****	****	*	****	****	*	****	****	*	****	****	*	****	****	*	****	****	*	****	****
****	****	*	****	****	*	****	****	*	****	****	*	****	****	*	****	****	*	****	****
****	****	*	****	****	*	****	****	*	****	****	*	****	****		****	****		****	****

Seating Plan

P = Premier, LO = Leader of Opposition, L = Leader of the NDP.

== List of members ==
Riding	Member	Party	First elected / previously elected	No. of terms	Notes
Algoma—Manitoulin	Michael A. Brown	Liberal	1987	5th term	Speaker of the Legislature from October 11, 2005.
Ancaster—Dundas—Flamborough—Aldershot	Ted McMeekin	Liberal	2000	2nd term	
Barrie—Simcoe—Bradford	Joe Tascona	Progressive Conservative	1995	3rd term	
Beaches—East York	Michael Prue	NDP	2001	2nd term	
Bramalea—Gore—Malton—Springdale	Kuldip Kular	Liberal	2003	1st term	
Brampton Centre	Linda Jeffrey	Liberal	2003	1st term	
Brampton West—Mississauga	Vic Dhillon	Liberal	2003	1st term	
Brant	Dave Levac	Liberal	1999	2nd term	
Bruce—Grey—Owen Sound	Bill Murdoch	Progressive Conservative	1990	4th term	
Burlington	Cam Jackson	Progressive Conservative	1985	6th term	Resigned seat September 28, 2006, to run for Mayor of Burlington.
Burlington	Joyce Savoline (2007)	Progressive Conservative	2007	1st term	Won by-election February 8, 2007.
Cambridge	Gerry Martiniuk	Progressive Conservative	1995	3rd term	
Chatham-Kent—Essex	Pat Hoy	Liberal	1995	3rd term	
Davenport	Tony Ruprecht	Liberal	1981	7th term	
Don Valley East	**David Caplan**	Liberal	1997	3rd term	
Don Valley West	Kathleen Wynne	Liberal	2003	1st term	
Dufferin—Peel—Wellington—Grey	Ernie Eves	Progressive Conservative	1981, (Note: Parry Sound) 2002	8th term*	PC Party Leader and Leader of the Opposition until September 28, 2004. Resigned seat January 31, 2005.
Dufferin—Peel—Wellington—Grey	John Tory (2005)	Progressive Conservative	2005	1st term	PC Party Leader from September 28, 2004. Won by-election March 17, 2005. Leader of the Opposition from March 29.
Durham	John O'Toole	Progressive Conservative	1995	3rd term	
Eglinton—Lawrence	**Michael Colle**	Liberal	1995	3rd term	
Elgin—Middlesex—London	**Steve Peters**	Liberal	1999	2nd term	
Erie—Lincoln	Tim Hudak	Progressive Conservative	1995	3rd term	
Essex	Bruce Crozier	Liberal	1993	4th term	
Etobicoke Centre	**Donna Cansfield**	Liberal	2003	1st term	
Etobicoke North	Shafiq Qaadri	Liberal	2003	1st term	
Etobicoke—Lakeshore	**Laurel Broten**	Liberal	2003	1st term	
Glengarry—Prescott—Russell	Jean-Marc Lalonde	Liberal	1995	3rd term	
Guelph—Wellington	Liz Sandals	Liberal	2003	1st term	
Haldimand—Norfolk—Brant	Toby Barrett	Progressive Conservative	1995	3rd term	
Haliburton—Victoria—Brock	Laurie Scott	Progressive Conservative	2003	1st term	
Halton	Ted Chudleigh	Progressive Conservative	1995	3rd term	
Hamilton East	Dominic Agostino	Liberal	1995	3rd term	Died March 24, 2004.
Hamilton East	Andrea Horwath (2004)	NDP	2004	1st term	Won by-election May 13, 2004.
Hamilton Mountain	**Marie Bountrogianni**	Liberal	1999	2nd term	
Hamilton West	Judy Marsales	Liberal	2003	1st term	
Hastings—Frontenac—Lennox and Addington	**Leona Dombrowsky**	Liberal	1999	2nd term	
Huron—Bruce	Carol Mitchell	Liberal	2003	1st term	
Kenora—Rainy River	Howard Hampton	NDP	1987	5th term	NDP Party Leader
Kingston and the Islands	**John Gerretsen**	Liberal	1995	3rd term	
Kitchener Centre	John Milloy	Liberal	2003	1st term	
Kitchener—Waterloo	Elizabeth Witmer	Progressive Conservative	1990	4th term	
Lambton—Kent—Middlesex	Maria Van Bommel	Liberal	2003	1st term	
Lanark—Carleton	Norm Sterling	Progressive Conservative	1977	8th term	
Leeds—Grenville	Bob Runciman	Progressive Conservative	1981	7th term	Leader of the Opposition, September 28, 2004 to March 29, 2005.
London North Centre	Deb Matthews	Liberal	2003	1st term	
London West	**Chris Bentley**	Liberal	2003	1st term	
London—Fanshaw	Khalil Ramal	Liberal	2003	1st term	
Markham	Tony Wong	Liberal	2003	1st term	Resigned seat September 25, 2006 in order to run for York Regional Council
Markham	Michael Chan (2007)	Liberal	2007	1st term	Won by-election February 8, 2007.
Mississauga Centre	**Harinder Takhar**	Liberal	2003	1st term	
Mississauga East	Peter Fonseca	Liberal	2003	1st term	
Mississauga South	Tim Peterson	Liberal	2003	1st term	Resigned from Liberal caucus March 29, 2007 to sit as independent. Joined PC caucus June 6, 2007.
Mississauga South	Tim Peterson	Independent	2003	1st term	Resigned from Liberal caucus March 29, 2007 to sit as independent. Joined PC caucus June 6, 2007.
Mississauga South	Tim Peterson	Progressive Conservative	2003	1st term	Resigned from Liberal caucus March 29, 2007 to sit as independent. Joined PC caucus June 6, 2007.
Mississauga West	Bob Delaney	Liberal	2003	1st term	
Nepean—Carleton	John Baird	Progressive Conservative	1995	3rd term	Resigned seat November 30, 2005, to run in 2006 Canadian Federal Election.
Nepean—Carleton	Lisa MacLeod (2006)	Progressive Conservative	2006	1st term	Won by-election March 30, 2006.
Niagara Centre	Peter Kormos	NDP	1988	5th term	
Niagara Falls	Kim Craitor	Liberal	2003	1st term	
Nickel Belt	Shelley Martel	NDP	1987	5th term	
Nipissing	Monique Smith	Liberal	2003	1st term	
Northumberland	Lou Rinaldi	Liberal	2003	1st term	
Oak Ridges	Frank Klees	Progressive Conservative	1995	3rd term	
Oakville	Kevin Flynn	Liberal	2003	1st term	
Oshawa	Jerry Ouellette	Progressive Conservative	1995	3rd term	
Ottawa Centre	Richard Patten	Liberal	1987, 1995	4th term*	
Ottawa South	**Dalton McGuinty**	Liberal	1990	4th term	Liberal Party Leader and Premier of Ontario
Ottawa West—Nepean	**Jim Watson**	Liberal	2003	1st term	
Ottawa—Orléans	Phil McNeely	Liberal	2003	1st term	
Ottawa—Vanier	**Madeleine Meilleur**	Liberal	2003	1st term	
Oxford	Ernie Hardeman	Progressive Conservative	1995	3rd term	
Parkdale—High Park	Gerard Kennedy	Liberal	1996	3rd term	Resigned seat May 23, 2006, in order to run in 2006 Liberal Party of Canada leadership election.
Parkdale—High Park	Cheri DiNovo (2006)	NDP	2006	1st term	Won by-election September 14, 2006.
Parry Sound—Muskoka	Norm Miller	Progressive Conservative	2001	2nd term	
Perth—Middlesex	John Wilkinson	Liberal	2003	1st term	
Peterborough	Jeff Leal	Liberal	2003	1st term	
Pickering—Ajax—Uxbridge	Wayne Arthurs	Liberal	2003	1st term	
Prince Edward—Hastings	Ernie Parsons	Liberal	1999	2nd term	
Renfrew—Nipissing—Pembroke	John Yakabuski	Progressive Conservative	2003	1st term	
Sarnia—Lambton	**Caroline Di Cocco**	Liberal	1999	2nd term	
Sault Ste. Marie	David Orazietti	Liberal	2003	1st term	
Scarborough Centre	Brad Duguid	Liberal	2003	1st term	
Scarborough East	**Mary Anne Chambers**	Liberal	2003	1st term	
Scarborough Southwest	Lorenzo Berardinetti	Liberal	2003	1st term	
Scarborough—Agincourt	**Gerry Phillips**	Liberal	1987	5th term	
Scarborough—Rouge River	Alvin Curling	Liberal	1985	6th term	Speaker of the Legislature November 19, 2003 to August 19, 2005. Resigned seat August 19, 2005, in order to accept appointment as Canada's ambassador to the Dominican Republic.
Scarborough—Rouge River	Bas Balkissoon (2005)	Liberal	2005	1st term	Won by-election November 24, 2005.
Simcoe North	Garfield Dunlop	Progressive Conservative	1999	2nd term	
Simcoe—Grey	Jim Wilson	Progressive Conservative	1990	4th term	
St. Catharines	**Jim Bradley**	Liberal	1977	8th term	
St. Paul's	**Michael Bryant**	Liberal	1999	2nd term	
Stoney Creek	Jennifer Mossop	Liberal	2003	1st term	
Stormont—Dundas—Charlottenburgh	Jim Brownell	Liberal	2003	1st term	
Sudbury	**Rick Bartolucci**	Liberal	1995	3rd term	
Thornhill	Mario Racco	Liberal	2003	1st term	
Thunder Bay—Atikokan	Bill Mauro	Liberal	2003	1st term	
Thunder Bay—Superior North	Michael Gravelle	Liberal	1995	3rd term	
Timiskaming—Cochrane	**David Ramsay**	Liberal (Note: First elected as a New Democrat)	1985	6th term	
Timmins—James Bay	Gilles Bisson	NDP	1990	4th term	
Toronto Centre—Rosedale	**George Smitherman**	Liberal	1999	2nd term	
Toronto—Danforth	Marilyn Churley	NDP	1990	4th term	Resigned seat November 29, 2005, in order to run in 2006 Canadian Federal Election.
Toronto—Danforth	Peter Tabuns (2006)	NDP	2006	1st term	Won by-election March 30, 2006
Trinity—Spadina	Rosario Marchese	NDP	1990	4th term	
Vaughan—King—Aurora	**Greg Sorbara**	Liberal	1985, (Note: York North/York Centre) 2002	5th term*	
Waterloo—Wellington	Ted Arnott	Progressive Conservative	1990	4th term	
Whitby—Ajax	Jim Flaherty	Progressive Conservative	1995	3rd term	Resigned seat November 29, 2005, in order to run in 2006 Canadian Federal Election.
Whitby—Ajax	Christine Elliott (2006)	Progressive Conservative	2006	1st term	Won by-election March 30, 2006.
Willowdale	David Zimmer	Liberal	2003	1st term	
Windsor West	**Sandra Pupatello**	Liberal	1995	3rd term	
Windsor—St. Clair	**Dwight Duncan**	Liberal	1995	3rd term	
York Centre	**Monte Kwinter**	Liberal	1985	6th term	
York North	Julia Munro	Progressive Conservative	1995	3rd term	
York South—Weston	Joseph Cordiano	Liberal	1985	6th term	Resigned seat September 18, 2006.
York South—Weston	Paul Ferreira (2007)	NDP	2007	1st term	Won by-election February 8, 2007.
York West	Mario Sergio	Liberal	1995	3rd term	

- Cabinet ministers are in **bold**. Party leaders are in italics. Premier is in **both**.
