= George Samis =

Ontario member of parliament

Ontario MPP
- In office 1975–1985
- Preceded by: New riding
- Succeeded by: Luc Guindon
- Constituency: Cornwall
- In office 1974–1975
- Preceded by: Fernand Guindon
- Succeeded by: Riding dissolved
- Constituency: Stormont

Personal details
- Born: March 24, 1943 (age 83) Montreal, Quebec
- Party: New Democrat
- Profession: Teacher

George Roy Samis (born March 24, 1943) is a former politician in Ontario, Canada. He served in the Legislative Assembly of Ontario from 1974 to 1985 as a member of the New Democratic Party (NDP).

== Background ==
He was born in Montreal, Quebec, and was educated at the Université de Montréal and the University of Waterloo. A high school teacher

== Politics ==
He ran for the Ontario legislature in the 1971 provincial election, and lost to Progressive Conservative Fernand Guindon in Stormont.

Guindon resigned from the legislature in 1974, and Samis contested a by-election to succeed him. He was successful, defeating Progressive Conservative candidate Guy Leger. Samis was re-elected for the redistributed constituency of Cornwall in 1975, 1977 and 1981. He supported Bob Rae for the party leadership in 1982.

Samis announced his retirement from the legislature in early 1985. He remains the only New Democrat to have represented the city of Cornwall at either the provincial or federal level.

At the time of Samis's retirement, the Progressive Conservative party had governed Ontario without interruption for forty-two years. Samis argued in March 1985 that the NDP would be unable to remove the Progressive Conservatives from office unless it formed an alliance with the Ontario Liberal Party. After the 1985 election, an historic two-year pact between the Liberals and NDP allowed Liberal leader David Peterson to form government as premier. The Peterson government appointed Samis to the Ontario Highway Transport Board in 1986.

Samis later moved to the Kingston area. In the 1999 provincial election, he endorsed Liberal candidate John Cleary in Stormont—Dundas—Charlottenburgh, a successor riding to Cornwall.

== See also ==
- List of University of Waterloo people
