= Ministry of International Trade =

Ministry of the Government of Ontario, Canada

- Ministère du Commerce international (French)

Government ministry overview
- Formed: 2016
- Dissolved: 2018
- Superseding Government ministry: Ministry of Economic Development, Job Creation and Trade
- Jurisdiction: Government of Ontario

The Ministry of International Trade (French: Ministère du Commerce international) was a ministry of the Government of Ontario that was responsible for international trade issues in the Canadian province of Ontario. The position of Minister of International Trade in the Executive Council of Ontario (or provincial cabinet) was held by Michael Chan.

The ministry was created in 2016 from the splitting of the then Ministry of Citizenship, Immigration and International Trade into this ministry and the Ministry of Citizenship and Immigration. The Ministry of International Trade was dissolved in 2018, and its functions were taken over by the Ministry of Economic Development, Job Creation and Trade.

== See also ==
- Minister of International Trade (Canada)
