= Faisal Hassan =

Canadian politician

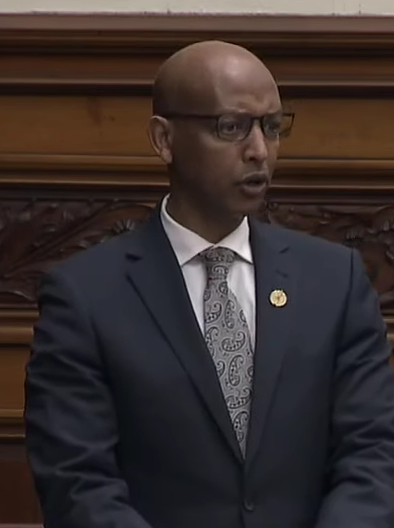

Critic, Youth Engagement
- In office August 23, 2018 – May 3, 2022

Member of the Ontario Provincial Parliament for York South—Weston
- In office June 7, 2018 – May 3, 2022
- Leader: Andrea Horwath
- Preceded by: Laura Albanese
- Succeeded by: Michael Ford

Personal details
- Born: Faisal Ahmed Hassan Somalia
- Party: Ontario New Democrat
- Occupation: Broadcaster, author

Faisal Ahmed Hassan is a Canadian politician, who was a member of the Legislative Assembly of Ontario from 2018 until his defeat in the 2022 Ontario general election. He represented the riding of York South—Weston as a member of the Ontario New Democratic Party.

Hassan is originally from Somalia. He emigrated to Canada in 1990, first settling in Winnipeg, Manitoba.

For over 15 years, Hassan was active in housing issues in Toronto with Midaynta Community Services, the Toronto Community Hostel, and Woodgreen Housing.

He was the NDP candidate in Etobicoke North in the 2015 federal election, and has worked as a constituency assistant to Paul Ferreira and Mike Sullivan.

Since the start of the COVID-19 pandemic in Ontario, he has been advocating for a moratorium on COVID-19 evictions.

He was part of Ontario's first ever Black Caucus, alongside NDP caucus colleagues Laura Mae Lindo, Rima Berns-McGown, Jill Andrew and Kevin Yarde.

== Electoral record ==
2025 Ontario general election: York South—Weston
Party	Candidate	Votes	%	±%	Expenditures
Progressive Conservative	Mohamed Firin	11,142	35.15	–1.45	$71,556
Liberal	Daniel Di Giorgio	10,940	34.70	+10.46	$42,110
New Democratic	Faisal Hassan	8,101	25.56	–8.42	$95,418
Green	Lilian Barrera	844	2.66	+0.13	$0
New Blue	Viktor Ehikwe	396	1.25	+0.12	$4,033
Independent	K. Ann Thomas	213	0.68	N/A	
Total valid votes/expense limit		31,698	99.10	–0.02	$133,163
Total rejected, unmarked, and declined ballots		287	0.90	+0.02	
Turnout		31,985	39.00	+0.89	
Eligible voters		82,019			
Progressive Conservative hold		Swing		–5.96	
Source: Elections Ontario

2022 Ontario general election: York South—Weston
Party	Candidate	Votes	%	±%	Expenditures
Progressive Conservative	Michael Ford	11,138	36.60	+3.65	$69,685
New Democratic	Faisal Hassan	10,342	33.98	−2.09	$97,063
Liberal	Nadia Guerrera	7,377	24.24	−3.59	$82,208
Green	Ignacio Mongrell Gonzalez	770	2.53	−0.01	$0
New Blue	Tom Hipsz	345	1.13		$0
Ontario Party	Ana Gabriela Ortiz	251	0.82		$217
Independent	James Michael Fields	209	0.69		$632
Total valid votes/expense limit		30,432	99.12	+0.31	$112,794
Total rejected, unmarked, and declined ballots		271	0.88	−0.31	
Turnout		30,703	38.11	−11.06	
Eligible voters		80,336			
Progressive Conservative gain from New Democratic		Swing		+2.87	
Source(s): "Summary of Valid Votes Cast for Each Candidate" (PDF). Elections Ontario. 2022. Archived from the original on 2023-05-18.; "Statistical Summary by Electoral District" (PDF). Elections Ontario. 2022. Archived from the original on 2023-05-21.

2018 Ontario general election: York South—Weston
Party	Candidate	Votes	%	±%
New Democratic	Faisal Hassan	13,455	36.07	-1.18
Progressive Conservative	Mark DeMontis	12,290	32.95	+21.69
Liberal	Laura Albanese	10,379	27.83	-20.02
Green	Grad Murray	946	2.54	+0.10
Libertarian	Bonnie Hu	228	0.61	
Total valid votes		37,298	98.81	
Total rejected, unmarked and declined ballots		449	1.19	-0.03
Turnout		37,747	49.17	+3.03
Eligible voters		76,772		
New Democratic gain from Liberal		Swing		+9.42
Source: Elections Ontario

2015 Canadian federal election: Etobicoke North
Party	Candidate	Votes	%	±%	Expenditures
Liberal	Kirsty Duncan	26,251	62.41	+19.84	$69,670.96
Conservative	Toyin Dada	9,673	23.00	-8.96	$60,237.66
New Democratic	Faisal Hassan	5,220	12.41	-11.21	$37,513.09
Green	Akhtar Ayub	524	1.25	+1.08	$1,558.16
Marxist–Leninist	Anna Di Carlo	232	0.55		–
No affiliation	George Szebik	164	0.39	–	–
Total valid votes/expense limit		42,064	100.00		$201,932.10
Total rejected ballots		257	0.61	–	
Turnout		42,321	62.18	–	
Eligible voters		68,063			
Liberal hold		Swing		+14.40	
Source: Elections Canada
