= Stormont—Dundas—South Glengarry =

Stormont—Dundas—South Glengarry could refer to

- Stormont—Dundas—South Glengarry (provincial electoral district)
- Stormont—Dundas—South Glengarry (federal electoral district)

== See also ==
- United Counties of Stormont, Dundas and Glengarry
