= Mohamed Firin =

Canadian politician from Ontario

Mohamed Firin MPP
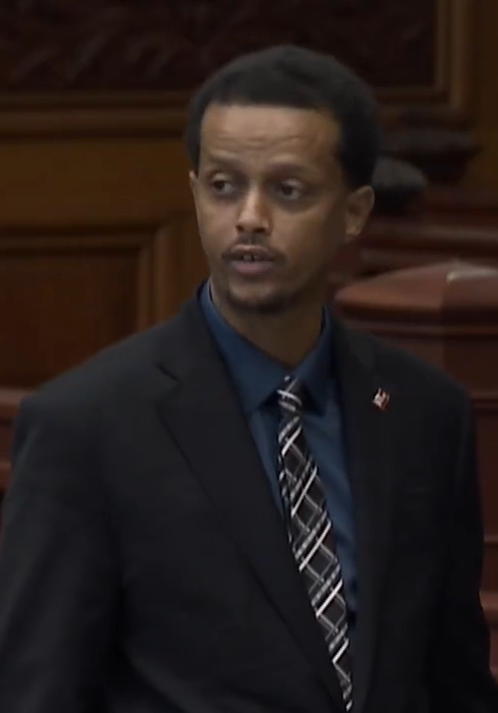
- Firin in 2025

Member of the Ontario Provincial Parliament for York South—Weston
- Incumbent
- Assumed office February 27, 2025
- Preceded by: Michael Ford

Parliamentary Assistant to the Minister of Labour, Immigration, Training and Skills Development
- Incumbent
- Assumed office April 7, 2025
- Minister: Trevor Jones

Parliamentary Assistant to the Minister of Tourism, Culture and Gaming
- Incumbent
- Assumed office April 7, 2025
- Minister: Zee Hamid

Personal details
- Party: Progressive Conservative

Mohamed Firin is a Canadian politician who has served as a member of the Legislative Assembly of Ontario (MPP) since the 2025 Ontario general election. A member of the Progressive Conservative Party of Ontario, he represents the riding of York South—Weston.

He serves as Parliamentary Assistant to two portfolios: Labour, Immigration, Training and Skills Development, and Tourism, Culture and Gaming.

Prior to his election he served as a community opportunities advocate. He was appointed to this role by the Lieutenant Governor of Ontario. He was also Special Advisor to the Premier of Ontario. Born in Canada, he is of Somali descent.
