= Michael Ford (politician) =

Canadian politician (born 1994)

The Honourable Michael Ford ECO
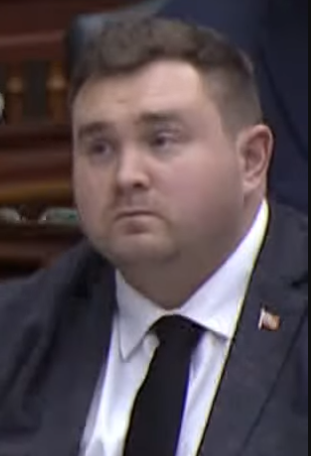
- Ford in 2024

Ontario Minister of Citizenship and Multiculturalism
- In office June 24, 2022 – March 19, 2025
- Premier: Doug Ford
- Preceded by: Parm Gill
- Succeeded by: Graham McGregor

Member of Provincial Parliament
- In office June 2, 2022 – March 19, 2025
- Preceded by: Faisal Hassan
- Succeeded by: Mohamed Firin
- Constituency: York South—Weston

Toronto City Councillor
- In office December 1, 2018 – June 15, 2022
- Preceded by: Ward established
- Succeeded by: Rose Milczyn
- Constituency: Ward 1 Etobicoke North

Toronto City Councillor
- In office July 25, 2016 – December 1, 2018
- Preceded by: Rob Ford
- Succeeded by: Ward dissolved
- Constituency: Ward 2 Etobicoke North

Toronto District School Board Trustee
- In office December 1, 2014 – May 6, 2016
- Preceded by: John Hastings
- Succeeded by: Avtar Minhas
- Constituency: Ward 1 Etobicoke North

Personal details
- Born: Michael Douglas Aldo Ford Stirpe; 1994 (age 31–32) Toronto, Ontario, Canada
- Party: Progressive Conservative (provincial)
- Other political affiliations: Independent (municipal)
- Relatives: Rob Ford (uncle); Doug Ford (uncle); Doug Ford Sr. (grandfather); Krista Haynes (cousin)
- Website: Michael Ford MPP

Michael Douglas Ford ECO (born Michael Douglas Aldo Ford Stirpe; 1994) is a Canadian lobbyist and politician who served as the Ontario minister of citizenship and multiculturalism from 2022 to 2025. He was the member of Provincial Parliament (MPP) for York South—Weston from 2022 to 2025, representing the Progressive Conservative (PC) Party. Ford was a member of Toronto City Council from 2016 to 2022, representing Etobicoke North. He is the nephew of Doug Ford, the 26th premier of Ontario, and Rob Ford, the 64th mayor of Toronto. In 2025, Ford registered as a lobbyist.

== Early and personal life ==
Ford was born in 1994, to Ennio Stirpe and Kathy Ford in Toronto, Ontario. He attended Richview Collegiate Institute in Etobicoke, graduating in 2012. He is the nephew of Doug Ford, the 26th premier of Ontario, and Rob Ford, the 64th mayor of Toronto. He is the grandson of Doug Ford Sr., who was an MPP.

In 2014, Ford changed his surname from Stirpe to Ford, and removed Aldo from his given name. His father, Ennio Stirpe, was convicted of manslaughter in 2009 and convicted of attempted murder in 2012. Stirpe is currently incarcerated and serving an 18-year prison term for attempted murder.

== Political career ==
=== 2014 municipal election ===
In the 2014 municipal election, Ford was initially a candidate for Toronto City Council in Ward 2 Etobicoke North. However, he dropped out when his uncle, Rob Ford, withdrew from the mayoral race after being diagnosed with an abdominal tumour. Rob Ford then registered to run for the council seat, while Michael transferred his candidacy to the school board race.

During an interview with The Globe and Mail, Michael Ford acknowledged that his last name helped him get elected, but stated that he is his own man, and unlike his uncles. His colleagues on the school board were very concerned when Ford was elected due to his uncles' public lives in politics, but one of his colleagues, Marit Stiles, told the Globe that Ford was a hard worker, eager to learn, and wasn't afraid to ask questions. He also quickly earned a reputation for being more politically moderate and conciliatory than his uncles — including expressing admiration of Justin Trudeau, whom both of his uncles were known for criticizing, and attending Toronto's Pride Week parade.

=== Toronto City Council ===
Councillor Rob Ford died on March 22, 2016, at which time the council seat in Ward 2 was declared vacant. After city council declared on May 6 that a by-election would be held to fill the seat, Michael Ford announced he would resign his trustee position to run for council.

He won the by-election, winning 69.53 per cent of the vote over 11 other challengers. At 22, he is the youngest person in recent history to be elected to council.

Ford ran for re-election in the 2018 municipal election in the newly expanded Ward 1 Etobicoke North. He defeated fellow incumbent councillor Vincent Crisanti. In July 2025, after Ford decided not to run for re-election at the provincial level, he became a registered lobbyist at Toronto City Hall.

=== Provincial politics ===
In April 2022, Ford announced that he would run in the June provincial election in York South—Weston, for the Progressive Conservative Party. He was appointed Minister of Citizenship and Multiculturalism in the Ford Ministry. On September 20, 2024, Ford took a leave of absence to prioritize his "health and well-being over the next couple of months." On January 24, 2025, Ford announced that he would not be running for re-election in the 2025 Ontario general election.

== Post-political career ==
Ford is the principal at Etobicoke-based lobbying firm MDF Strategies. In June 2025, Ford appeared on the City of Toronto's lobbyist registry, representing Protexxa Inc., a cybersecurity company.

== Election results ==
2022 Ontario general election: York South—Weston
Party	Candidate	Votes	%	±%	Expenditures
Progressive Conservative	Michael Ford	11,138	36.60	+3.65	$69,685
New Democratic	Faisal Hassan	10,342	33.98	−2.09	$97,063
Liberal	Nadia Guerrera	7,377	24.24	−3.59	$82,208
Green	Ignacio Mongrell Gonzalez	770	2.53	−0.01	$0
New Blue	Tom Hipsz	345	1.13		$0
Ontario Party	Ana Gabriela Ortiz	251	0.82		$217
Independent	James Michael Fields	209	0.69		$632
Total valid votes/expense limit		30,432	99.12	+0.31	$112,794
Total rejected, unmarked, and declined ballots		271	0.88	−0.31	
Turnout		30,703	38.11	−11.06	
Eligible voters		80,336			
Progressive Conservative gain from New Democratic		Swing		+2.87	
Source(s): "Summary of Valid Votes Cast for Each Candidate" (PDF). Elections Ontario. 2022. Archived from the original on May 18, 2023.; "Statistical Summary by Electoral District" (PDF). Elections Ontario. 2022. Archived from the original on May 21, 2023.

2018 Toronto municipal election, Ward 1 Etobicoke North
Candidate	Votes	Vote share
Michael Ford	10,648	42.26%
Vincent Crisanti	8,654	34.34%
Naiima Farah	2,262	8.98%
Shirish Patel	1,945	7.72%
Carol Royer	642	2.55%
Michelle Garcia	439	1.74%
Peter D'Gama	253	1.00%
Christopher Noor	214	0.85%
Gurinder Patri	142	0.56%
Total	25,199	100%
Source: City of Toronto

2016 Toronto municipal by-election, Ward 2 Etobicoke North
Candidate	Votes	Vote share
Michael Ford	6,534	69.53%
Jeff Canning	1,918	20.41%
Christopher Strain	354	3.77%
Chloe-Marie Brown	152	1.62%
Christopher Noor	134	1.43%
Kevin Clarke	84	0.89%
Other candidates	221	2.35%
Total	9,397	100%
Source: City of Toronto

== See also ==
- Ford family (Canada)
