= Laura Albanese =

Canadian politician (born 1957)

The Honourable Laura Albanese ECO
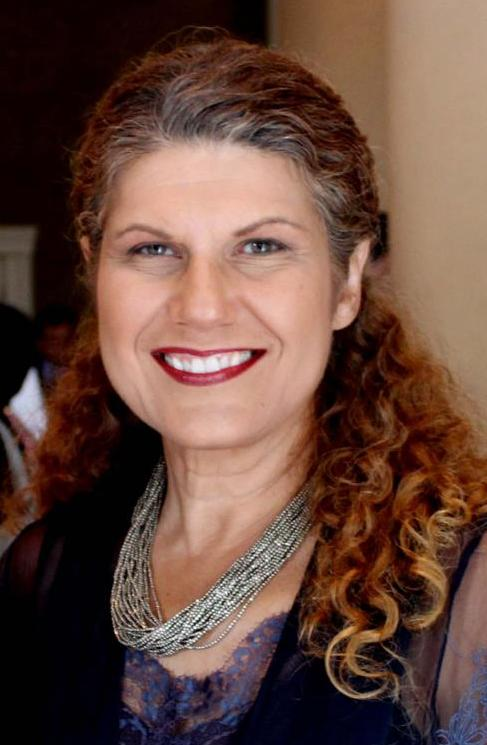

Member of the Ontario Provincial Parliament for York South—Weston
- In office October 10, 2007 – June 7, 2018
- Preceded by: Paul Ferreira
- Succeeded by: Faisal Hassan

Personal details
- Born: September 11, 1957 (age 68) Taranto, Italy
- Party: Liberal
- Spouse: Germinio Pio Politi
- Children: 2
- Occupation: Journalist

Laura Albanese Politi (born September 11, 1957) is a former politician in Ontario, Canada. She was a Liberal member of the Legislative Assembly of Ontario from 2007 to 2018 who represented the Toronto riding of York South—Weston. She served as a cabinet minister in the government of Kathleen Wynne. Prior to being elected, she worked as a news anchor for Italian language news programming on Omni Television working in Italian language programming.

== Background ==
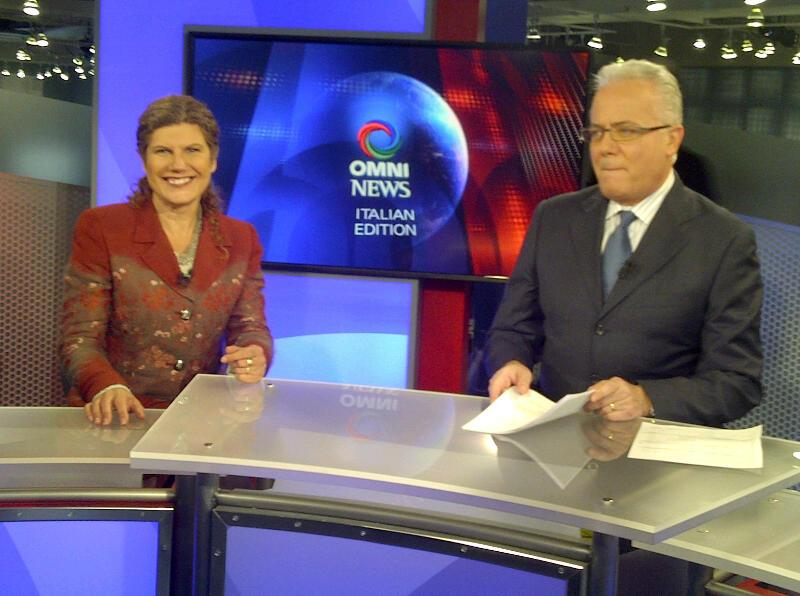
Albanese hosting Omni News: Italian Edition on CFMT

Albanese was born in Taranto, Italy, in 1957. In her youth, she moved back and forth between Canada and Italy. She settled in Canada in 1981 and has lived in York South-Weston ever since with her husband, artist Germinio Pio Politi. They have two adult children and two grandchildren.

Albanese worked in broadcast journalism spanning over two decades, from 1984 to 2007. She worked in Italian language programming at OMNI TV in a number of capacities. She was featured as Co-Anchor of OMNI News: Italian Edition, a one-hour daily Italian language newscast. She co-hosted Incontri with Vincenzo Somma. The show was an evening news show broadcast in the Italian language. Other shows that she worked on included Omni News: Italian Edition, Italianissimo, Telecorriere News, and Girotondo.

== Politics ==
Albanese was nominated as the Liberal candidate for the February 8, 2007 provincial by-election in the riding of York South—Weston. The by-election was triggered by the resignation of Joe Cordiano, who resigned his seat for personal reasons. The appointment of Albanese as the Liberal candidate was contested by David-Paul Sip, another potential candidate. Sip said that his candidacy was ignored by the riding association who wanted someone who would appeal to the riding's large Italian-speaking community. Sip launched a lawsuit against the Liberal party but Albanese remained as the Liberal candidate.

Albanese narrowly lost to Paul Ferreira of the New Democratic Party by 358 votes. Ferreira advocated raising the minimum wage from $8 to $10 which was opposed by the Liberal party. Voters were also angered by legislators who had recently given themselves a 25% pay increase. Eight months later Albanese was in a rematch with Ferreira in the 2007 provincial election. This time with a much larger voter turnout, Albanese edged Ferreira by 469 votes.

Albanese was appointed parliamentary assistant (PA) to the Minister of Culture, Aileen Carroll. Here she conducted an extensive Program Review on three specific cultural operating grants for Community Museums, Heritage and Public Libraries to modernize the formulas through which such grants are allocated.

During her first term as MPP, Albanese advocated for funding to build the Jane Street Hub a $6 Million investment toward building a new school for St. John the Evangelist, a major expansion at West Park Healthcare Centre with a push for a Community Benefits Agreement, full-day kindergarten, and introduced a Private Members Motion calling on the Province to embrace electrification and another calling on increased safety of residential neighbourhoods close to volatile fuels operations. She also introduced a Private Members Bill to eliminate the deduction of Old Age Security from workers compensation benefits.

Albanese was re-elected in the 2011 election.

In her second term she was appointed PA to the Minister of Labour where she prepared a report with recommendations to enhance Ontario's health and safety prevention capacity, by augmenting efforts to identify and reduce underground economic activities in the construction sector. This contributed to the implementation of Ontario's Integrated Health and Safety Strategy and the appointment of the province's first Chief Prevention Officer.

In February 2013, Albanese was appointed PA to the Minister of Tourism, Culture and Sport, Michael Chan, where she represented the Minister and promoted the ministry at various events, conferences and forums.

In 2013, when Kathleen Wynne took over as Premier, Albanese was appointed as Parliamentary Assistant to the Premier and also made Deputy Government Whip. In March 2014, she was also appointed as Parliamentary Assistant to the Minister of Municipal Affairs and Housing but this was cut short soon after as the minority government was poised to lose a confidence vote on their budget bill due to not having the support of the NDP “despite including so many spending measures designed to win NDP support”[]. Opting to go straight to the polls instead of waiting to be defeated in the legislature, Wynne triggered an unexpected election period on May 2, with election day set for June 12, 2014.

In the June 2014 election Albanese met Ferreira for a fourth time, and defeated him by 3,572 votes.

After the 2014 election Albanese was appointed as Parliamentary Assistant to the Minister of Finance and also served as Government Caucus Chair. At Finance, Albanese led the five-year review of the Credit Unions and Caisses Populaires Act, 1994 which included an extensive in-person consultation tour across Ontario, and prepared a report outlining fifteen different recommendations, which were adopted and shaped amendments to the Act and related regulations. Later, Albanese led a series of roundtables and meetings to consult with experts and industry stakeholders to tackle tax avoidance schemes and practices. Albanese also had input in ways to better address the underground economy in Ontario across sectors.

Albanese also held yearly pre-budget consultation town halls (both in-person and virtual town halls) across the province and in her local riding of York South-Weston.

In November 2015, Albanese introduced the Albanian Heritage Month Act as a Private Members’ Bill. It did not receive royal assent during the legislative session and needed to be reintroduced as early as Fall 2016 although Albanese could no longer introduce PMBs as a newly appointed Minister. The bill was introduced and passed in the Fall 2016 session by her Parliamentary Assistant, Dr. Shafiq Qaadri but she was credited in bringing the legislation forward with the 2017 ACE Contribution to Albanian Community Award.

On June 13, 2016, Albanese was appointed to cabinet as the Minister of Citizenship and Immigration. Albanese's Mandate letter from the Premier reveals her priorities as a Minister. Here Albanese successfully negotiated and signed the new Canada-Ontario Immigration Agreement (COIA) and associated MOUs with the federal government. Albanese also stabilized the Ontario Immigration Nominee Program (OINP) by securing an increase in the allocation of nominees from the Federal government, attaining a permanent increase in staffing and implementing an e-filing application system. Albanese secured increased investment for the Ontario Bridge Training Program. Strengthened programs and services aimed at helping newcomers and refugees overcome social and economic integration barriers through the Refugee Resettlement Secretariat. Albanese represented Ontario as a member of the Federal Ad Hoc Intergovernmental Task Force on Irregular Migration, formed to respond to the irregular border crossings by asylum seekers. Albanese also published a progress report in 2016 on Ontario's Immigration Strategy

With Premier Kathleen Wynne's increasing unpopularity leading up to the 2018 Ontario Provincial election and Doug Ford becoming the leader of the Conservative Party, Albanese lost an unprecedented number of votes to the Conservative Party candidate which led to her third-place defeat and the new Ontario NDP candidate, Faisal Hassan winning the seat.

=== Local Issues ===
York South-Weston was plagued with many transit issues during Albanese's time as an MPP, mostly due to the expansion of the GO Kitchener line, and construction of the UP Express and Eglinton Crosstown LRT, all run by the provincial agency Metrolinx. With the expansion of the GO Kitchener line and the addition of the UP Express, she advocated for electrification to reduce emissions in the community. Metrolinx had originally planned to build the UP Express as an express train from Union station direct to Pearson International Airport which ran straight through York South Weston with no stops in-between. After community outcry, Albanese supported building a stop for the community in Weston and advocated to the Minister of Transportation. She was eventually successful in winning a UP Express stop in Weston. The next issue with the UP Express was the cost. Now that there was a stop in Weston, the community wanted to use it as regular transit and a quick way to get downtown without paying the premium prices. Albanese again pushed for a lower price for the community and eventually, the prices were lowered.

Metrolinx planned to construct an 18 megawatt natural gas-powered backup power plant at the Eglinton LRT Carhouse, in Mount Dennis. In response the Mount Dennis Community Association prepared a petition voicing concern that a plant using a fossil fuel would cause unacceptable local pollution, when used. On July 23, 2016, Albanese met with representatives of the MDCA, and assured them that she would advocate to the provincial agency and to the Minister of Transportation to investigate less polluting alternatives to fossil fuels. She successfully changed the decision to build the 18-megawatt gas plant, and Metrolinx, together with Toronto Hydro, are building a battery energy storage system for backup power to the Eglinton LRT instead.

== Cabinet posts ==
Wynne ministry, Province of Ontario (2013–2018)
Cabinet post (1)
Predecessor	Office	Successor
Michael Chan	Minister of Citizenship and Immigration; 2016–2018	None - position abolished

== Electoral record ==
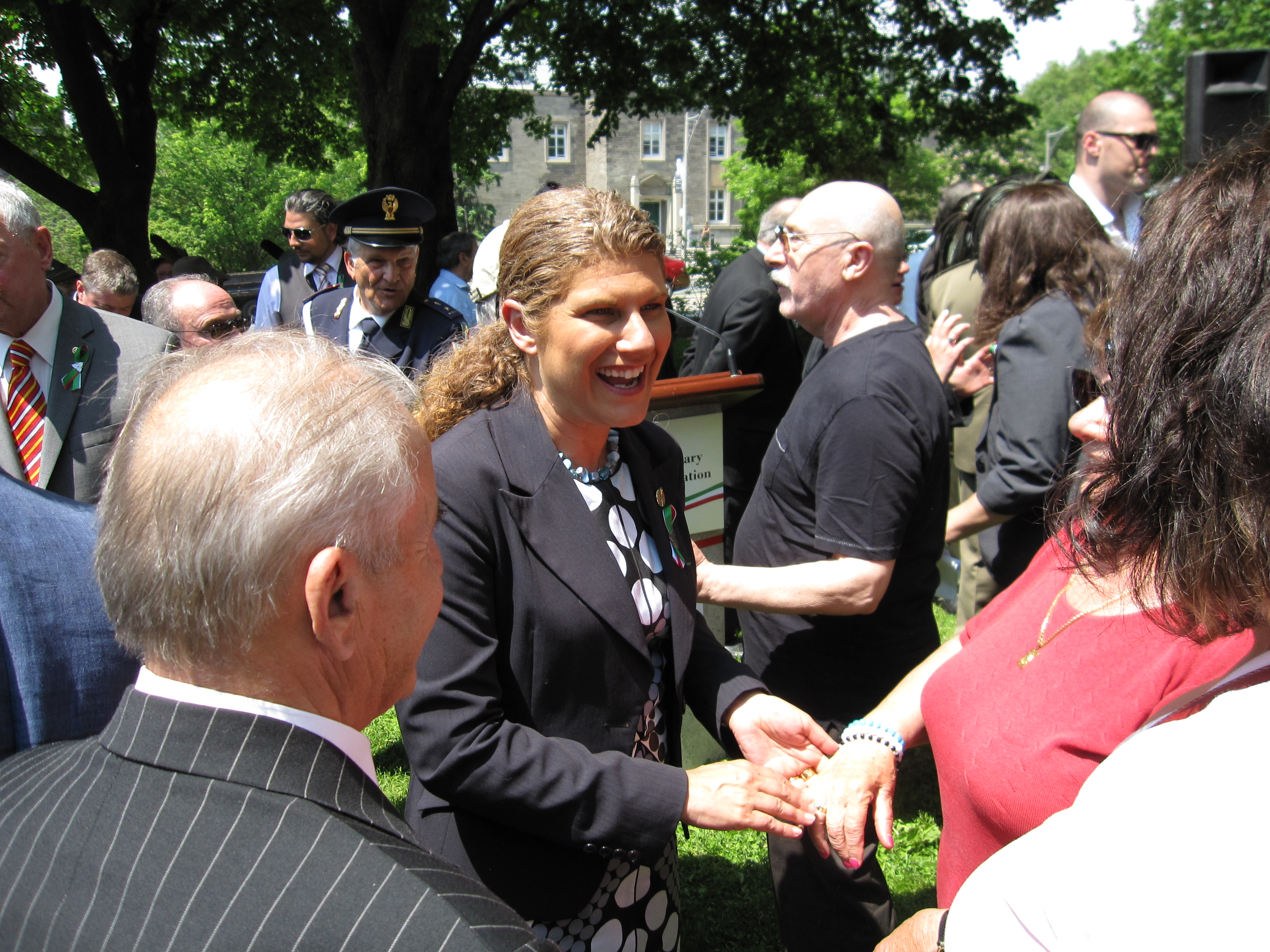
Albanese at an Italian Day celebration - May 30, 2013

2018 Ontario general election: York South—Weston
Party	Candidate	Votes	%	±%
New Democratic	Faisal Hassan	13,455	36.07	-1.18
Progressive Conservative	Mark DeMontis	12,290	32.95	+21.69
Liberal	Laura Albanese	10,379	27.83	-20.02
Green	Grad Murray	946	2.54	+0.10
Libertarian	Bonnie Hu	228	0.61	
Total valid votes		37,298	98.81	
Total rejected, unmarked and declined ballots		449	1.19	-0.03
Turnout		37,747	49.17	+3.03
Eligible voters		76,772		
New Democratic gain from Liberal		Swing		+9.42
Source: Elections Ontario

2014 Ontario general election: York South—Weston
Party	Candidate	Votes	%	±%
Liberal	Laura Albanese	15,669	47.85	+3.30
New Democratic	Paul Ferreira	12,200	37.25	-4.93
Progressive Conservative	Andrew Ffrench	3,687	11.26	+0.16
Green	Jessica Higgins	797	2.43	+0.90
Freedom	Eric Compton	249	0.76	+0.27
Independent	Abi Issa	146	0.45	
Total valid votes		32,748	100.0	
Total rejected, unmarked and declined ballots		404	1.22	
Turnout		33,152	46.13	
Eligible voters		71,860		
Liberal hold		Swing		+4.11

2011 Ontario general election: York South—Weston
Party	Candidate	Votes	%	±%
Liberal	Laura Albanese	13,805	44.55	+1.61
New Democratic	Paul Ferreira	13,071	42.18	+0.64
Progressive Conservative	Lan Daniel	3,441	11.10	+1.26
Green	Keith Jarrett	474	1.53	-2.27
Freedom	Eric Compton	151	0.49	
Independent	Michael Radejewski	45	0.15	
Total valid votes		30,987	100.00	
Total rejected, unmarked and declined ballots		227	0.73	
Turnout		31,214	44.86	
Eligible voters		69,580		
Liberal hold		Swing		+0.49
Source(s) "Official return from the records / Rapport des registres officiel - York South—Weston" (PDF). Elections Ontario. 2011.

2007 Ontario general election: York South—Weston
Party	Candidate	Votes	%	±%
Liberal	Laura Albanese	13,846	42.94	+1.50
New Democratic	Paul Ferreira	13,394	41.54	-1.79
Progressive Conservative	Karen McMillan-Aver	3,173	9.84	-0.43
Green	Anthony Gratl	1,226	3.80	+2.41
Libertarian	Marco Dias	385	1.19	+0.67
Family Coalition	Mariangela Sanabria	218	0.68	-0.06
Total valid votes		32,242	100.0	
Total rejected, unmarked and declined ballots		433	1.33	
Turnout		32,675	46.34	
Eligible voters		70,518		
Liberal gain from New Democratic		Swing		+1.64
Source(s) Elections Ontario (2007). "General Election Poll By Poll Results: 106 York South-Weston" (PDF).

Ontario provincial by-election, February 8, 2007: York South—Weston Resignation of Joseph Cordiano
Party	Candidate	Votes	%	±%
New Democratic	Paul Ferreira	8,146	43.33	+24.04
Liberal	Laura Albanese	7,831	41.44	−20.12
Progressive Conservative	Pina Martino	1,917	10.27	−4.96
Green	Mir Kamal	263	1.39	−1.06
Independent	Kevin Clarke	220	1.16	
Independent	Mohammed Choudhary	142	0.75	
Family Coalition	Mariangela Sanabria	134	0.74	−0.73
Libertarian	Nunzio Venuto	101	0.52	
Freedom	Wayne Simmons	77	0.41	
Total valid votes		18,831	100.0	
Total rejected, unmarked and declined ballots		146	0.77	
Turnout		18,977	28.62	
Eligible voters		66,308		
New Democratic gain from Liberal		Swing		+22.08
Source(s) Elections Ontario (2007). "By-Election 2007: Summary of Valid Ballots Cast for Each Candidate".
