= Cornwall (provincial electoral district) =

Former provincial electoral district in Ontario, Canada

Cornwall was the name of a provincial electoral district that elected one member to the Legislative Assembly of Ontario, Canada. It existed from 1867 to 1886, when it was redistributed into Cornwall and Stormont, and from 1975 to 1999 when it was abolished into Stormont—Dundas—Charlottenburgh. It consisted of the city of Cornwall, the Township of Cornwall and the Township of Charlottenburgh.

== MPPs ==
=== 1867–1886 ===
1. John Sandfield Macdonald, Conservative (1867–1872)
2. John Goodall Snetsinger, Liberal (1872–1875)
3. Alexander Fraser McIntyre, Conservative (1875)
4. John Goodall Snetsinger, Liberal (1875–1879)
5. William Mack, Liberal (1879–1883)
6. Alexander Peter Ross, Conservative (1883–1886)

=== 1975–1999 ===
1. George Samis, New Democratic Party (1975–1985)
2. Luc Guindon, Progressive Conservative (1985–1987)
3. John Cleary, Liberal (1987–1999)

== Election results ==
=== 1975–1995 ===
1995 Ontario general election
Party	Candidate	Votes	%	±%
Liberal	John Cleary	14,507	59.70	+13.17
Progressive Conservative	Keith Clingen	7,838	32.26	+20.67
New Democratic	Sydney Gardiner	1,719	7.07	–18.68
Natural Law	Bernise Featherstone	236	0.97	–
Total valid votes		24,300	99.02	
Total rejected, unmarked and declined ballots		240	0.98	+0.21
Turnout		24,540	55.53	–8.26
Eligible voters		44,191		
Liberal hold		Swing		–3.75
Source: Elections Ontario

1990 Ontario general election
Party	Candidate	Votes	%	±%
Liberal	John Cleary	12,725	46.53	+6.30
New Democratic	Leo Courville	7,044	25.76	+0.24
Confederation of Regions	Carol-Ann Ross	4,409	16.12	–
Progressive Conservative	Don Kannon	3,169	11.59	–22.66
Total valid votes		27,347	99.23	
Total rejected, unmarked and declined ballots		212	0.77	+0.28
Turnout		27,559	63.79	–0.49
Eligible voters		43,201		
Liberal hold		Swing		+3.03
Source: Elections Ontario

1987 Ontario general election
Party	Candidate	Votes	%	±%
Liberal	John Cleary	10,653	40.24	+10.74
Progressive Conservative	Luc Guindon	9,067	34.25	–9.33
New Democratic	Robert Roth	6,756	25.52	–1.41
Total valid votes		26,476	99.52	
Total rejected ballots		129	0.48	+0.03
Turnout		26,605	64.28	+4.96
Eligible voters		41,387		
Liberal gain from Progressive Conservative		Swing		+10.03
Source: Elections Ontario

1985 Ontario general election
Party	Candidate	Votes	%	±%
Progressive Conservative	Luc Guindon	9,430	43.57	+9.04
Liberal	Claude Poirier	6,384	29.50	+5.94
New Democratic	Steve J. Corrie	5,828	26.93	–14.97
Total valid votes		21,642	99.54	
Total rejected ballots		100	0.46	+0.13
Turnout		21,742	59.33	–4.29
Eligible voters		36,648		
Progressive Conservative gain from New Democratic		Swing		+12.01
Source: Elections Ontario

1981 Ontario general election
Party	Candidate	Votes	%	±%
New Democratic	George Samis	9,484	41.90	–4.18
Progressive Conservative	James A. Kirkey	7,817	34.54	–9.30
Liberal	Brian Lynch	5,333	23.56	+13.91
Total valid votes		22,634	99.67	
Total rejected ballots		76	0.33	–0.12
Turnout		22,710	63.62	–0.30
Eligible voters		35,698		
New Democratic hold		Swing		+2.56
Source: Elections Ontario

1977 Ontario general election
Party	Candidate	Votes	%	±%
New Democratic	George Samis	9,978	46.08	–4.97
Progressive Conservative	James A. Kirkey	9,492	43.84	+4.24
Liberal	Allan W. Burn	2,089	9.65	+0.29
Independent	James R. Rideout	94	0.43	–
Total valid votes		21,653	99.55	
Total rejected ballots		98	0.45	+0.17
Turnout		21,751	63.92	–6.43
Eligible voters		34,029		
New Democratic hold		Swing		–4.60
Source: Elections Ontario

1975 Ontario general election
Party	Candidate	Votes	%
New Democratic	George Samis	11,958	51.05
Progressive Conservative	Rudy Villeneuve	9,276	39.60
Liberal	Madeleine Germain	2,191	9.35
Total valid votes		23,425	99.72
Total rejected ballots		66	0.28
Turnout		23,491	70.35
Eligible voters		33,392	
New Democratic pickup new district.			
Source: Elections Ontario

=== Cornwall and Stormont (1886–1890) ===
1886 Ontario general election: Cornwall and Stormont
Party	Candidate	Votes	%	±%
Liberal	William Mack	2,068	54.48	–
Conservative	James Leitch	1,728	45.52	–
Total valid votes		3,796	99.37	
Total rejected ballots		24	0.63	–
Turnout		3,820	69.39	–
Eligible voters		5,505		
Liberal notional gain		Swing		–
Source: Elections Ontario

=== 1867–1886 ===
1883 Ontario general election
Party	Candidate	Votes	%	±%
Conservative	Alexander Peter Ross	710	51.49	–
Liberal	William Mack	669	48.51	–
Total valid votes		1,379	99.78	
Total rejected ballots		3	0.22	–
Turnout		1,382	70.33	–
Eligible voters		1,965		
Conservative gain from Liberal		Swing		–
Source: Elections Ontario

1879 Ontario general election
Party	Candidate	Votes
Liberal	William Mack	Acclaimed
Source: Elections Ontario

Ontario provincial by-election, 1875 Previous election voided
Party	Candidate	Votes	%	±%
Liberal	John Goodall Snetsinger	481	50.42	−7.41
Conservative	Alexander Fraser McIntyre	473	49.58	
Total valid votes		954		
Liberal hold		Swing		−7.41
Source: History of the Electoral Districts, Legislatures and Ministries of the Province of Ontario

1875 Ontario general election
Party	Candidate	Votes	%	±%
Conservative	Alexander Fraser McIntyre	499	50.25	
Liberal	John Goodall Snetsinger	494	49.75	−8.08
Turnout		993	68.44	
Eligible voters		1,451		
Election voided
Source: Elections Ontario

Ontario provincial by-election, July 16, 1872 Death of John Sandfield Macdonald
Party	Candidate	Votes	%
Liberal	John Goodall Snetsinger	410	57.83
Independent	Mr. Amable	299	42.17
Total valid votes		709	100.0
Liberal gain from Conservative			
Source: History of the Electoral Districts, Legislatures and Ministries of the Province of Ontario

1871 Ontario general election
Party	Candidate	Votes
Conservative	John Sandfield Macdonald	Acclaimed
Source: Elections Ontario

1867 Ontario general election
Party	Candidate	Votes	%
Conservative	John Sandfield Macdonald	479	64.73
Liberal	William C. Allen	261	35.27
Total valid votes		740	72.27
Eligible voters		1,024	
Conservative pickup new district.			
Source: Elections Ontario

== See also ==
- List of Ontario provincial electoral districts
- Canadian provincial electoral districts
