= Jim McDonell =

Canadian politician

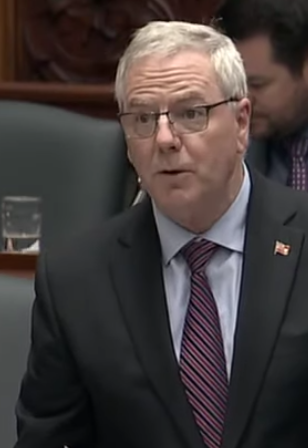

Parliamentary Assistant to the Minister of Municipal Affairs and Housing (Municipal Affairs)
- In office June 29, 2018 – May 3, 2022
- Minister: Steve Clark

Member of the Ontario Provincial Parliament for Stormont—Dundas—South Glengarry
- In office October 6, 2011 – May 3, 2022
- Preceded by: Jim Brownell
- Succeeded by: Nolan Quinn

Mayor of South Glengarry
- In office 2003–2011
- Preceded by: Charles Sangster
- Succeeded by: Ian McLeod

Personal details
- Born: 1954 (age 71–72) South Glengarry, Ontario
- Party: Progressive Conservative
- Spouse: Margie McDonell
- Children: 3
- Occupation: Engineer

James A. McDonell (born c. 1954) is a Canadian politician. He was a Progressive Conservative member of the Legislative Assembly of Ontario who represented the riding of Stormont—Dundas—South Glengarry from 2011 until his retirement in 2022. He was mayor of the township of South Glengarry, Ontario from 2003 to 2011.

== Background ==
McDonell was born and raised on a dairy farm in South Glengarry, Ontario. He attended Queen's University where he earned a degree in engineering. He worked for Bell Canada for over 30 years in a number of roles. He and his wife Margie live in Williamstown, Ontario, where they raised their three children.

== Politics ==
In 2000, McDonell was elected as a councillor for the township of South Glengarry. In 2003 he was elected as mayor of the township.

In the 2011 provincial election he ran as the Progressive Conservative candidate in the riding of Stormont—Dundas—South Glengarry. He defeated Liberal candidate Mark MacDonald by 13,050 votes. He was easily re-elected in the 2014 election.

He served as the party's critic for Government and Consumer Services during his first term and on his second term served as a Member on the Standing Committee on Public Accounts as well as a Parliamentary Assistant to the Minister of Municipal Affairs and Housing (Municipal Affairs).

He stood down at the 2022 Ontario general election. He was replaced in the provincial parliament by fellow PC nominee Nolan Quinn.

=== Electoral record ===
2018 Ontario general election: Stormont—Dundas—South Glengarry
| Party | Candidate | Votes | % | ±% |
|---|---|---|---|---|
| Progressive Conservative | Jim McDonell | 26,780 | 61.51 | +9.79 |
| New Democratic | Marc Benoit | 9,416 | 21.63 | +0.72 |
| Liberal | Heather Megill | 5,386 | 12.37 | -10.82 |
| Green | Elaine Kennedy | 1,596 | 3.67 | +0.99 |
| Libertarian | Sabile Trimm | 360 | 0.83 | -0.68 |
| Total valid votes | | 43,538 | 98.93 | |
| Total rejected, unmarked and declined ballots | | 471 | 1.07 | -0.08 |
| Turnout | | 44,009 | 54.10 | +2.08 |
| Eligible voters | | 81,342 | | |
| Progressive Conservative hold | | Swing | | +4.53 |
Source: Elections Ontario

2014 Ontario general election
| Party | Candidate | Votes | % | ±% |
|---|---|---|---|---|
| Progressive Conservative | Jim McDonell | 19,457 | 50.18 | -5.07 |
| Liberal | John Earle | 9,287 | 23.95 | +2.29 |
| New Democratic | Elaine MacDonald | 8,374 | 21.60 | +0.95 |
| Green | Sharron Norman | 1,047 | 2.70 | +1.28 |
| Libertarian | Shawn McRae | 608 | 1.57 | +0.55 |
| Total valid votes | | 38,773 | 100.00 | |
| Progressive Conservative hold | | Swing | | -3.68 |
Source: Elections Ontario

2011 Ontario general election
| Party | Candidate | Votes | % | ±% |
|---|---|---|---|---|
| Progressive Conservative | Jim McDonell | 21,463 | 55.25 | +16.47 |
| Liberal | Mark A. Macdonald | 8,413 | 21.66 | -27.17 |
| New Democratic | Elaine MacDonald | 8,021 | 20.65 | +13.32 |
| Green | Justin Reist | 551 | 1.42 | -2.98 |
| Libertarian | Darcy Neal Donnelly | 396 | 1.02 | |
| Total valid votes | | 38,844 | 100.00 | |
| Total rejected, unmarked and declined ballots | | 205 | 0.52 | |
| Turnout | | 39,049 | 51.40 | |
| Eligible voters | | 75,975 | | |
| Progressive Conservative gain from Liberal | | Swing | | +21.82 |
Source: Elections Ontario
