= Alexander Fraser McIntyre =

Canadian politician (1847–1914)

Alexander Fraser McIntyre (December 25, 1847 – March 11, 1914) was a lawyer and political figure in Ontario, Canada. He represented Cornwall in the Legislative Assembly of Ontario as a Liberal Conservative in 1875.

The son of Daniel Eugene McIntyre and Anne Fraser, he was born in Williamstown, Canada West. His maternal grandfather was Alexander Fraser, who served in the Legislative Assembly of Upper Canada. McIntyre was educated in Cornwall and at the University of McGill College. He studied law with James Bethune in Cornwall and then with James Maclennan and Edward Blake in Toronto, and was called to the Ontario Bar in 1872. McIntyre set up practice in Cornwall and then moved to Ottawa in 1875, where he joined the law firm of Walker, McIntyre and Ferguson. In 1881, he became a partner in the law firm of Cockburn and McIntyre. After Cockburn died in 1883, he set up his own law firm of McIntyre and Lewis. McIntyre was solicitor for major local institutions such as the Bank of Montreal and the Civil Service Building Society.

McIntyre was elected to represent Corwall in the Ontario assembly in 1875 but his election was overturned after an appeal and he was defeated by John Goodall Snetsinger in the by-election which followed. He ran unsuccessfully for the City of Ottawa seat in the House of Commons of Canada as a Liberal in 1882 and again in 1887.

In 1877, he married Helen Macdonald.

McIntyre died in Cornwall in 1914.

== Electoral history ==
1875 Ontario general election: Cornwall
Party	Candidate	Votes	%	±%
Conservative	Alexander Fraser McIntyre	499	50.25	
Liberal	John Goodall Snetsinger	494	49.75	−8.08
Turnout		993	68.44	
Eligible voters		1,451		
Election voided
Source: Elections Ontario

Ontario provincial by-election, 1875: Cornwall Previous election voided
Party	Candidate	Votes	%	±%
Liberal	John Goodall Snetsinger	481	50.42	−7.41
Conservative	Alexander Fraser McIntyre	473	49.58	
Total valid votes		954		
Liberal hold		Swing		−7.41
Source: History of the Electoral Districts, Legislatures and Ministries of the Province of Ontario
