= John Goodall Snetsinger =

Canadian politician (1833–1909)

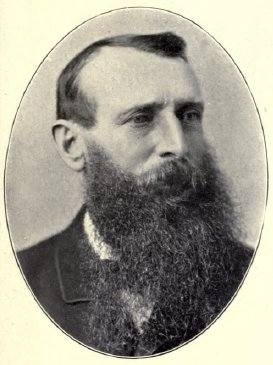

Member of the Canadian Parliament for Cornwall and Stormont
- In office 1896–1900
- Preceded by: Darby Bergin
- Succeeded by: Robert Abercrombie Pringle

Member of the Legislative Assembly of Ontario for Cornwall
- In office 1871–1875
- Preceded by: John Sandfield Macdonald
- Succeeded by: Alexander Fraser McIntyre
- In office 1875–1879
- Preceded by: Alexander Fraser McIntyre
- Succeeded by: William Mack

Personal details
- Born: October 13, 1833 Cornwall Township, Upper Canada
- Died: December 9, 1909 (aged 76) New York City, New York
- Party: Liberal
- Other political affiliations: Ontario Liberal Party

John Goodall Snetsinger (October 13, 1833 – December 9, 1909) was an Ontario merchant and political figure. He represented Cornwall in the Legislative Assembly of Ontario from 1872 to 1879 and Cornwall and Stormont in the House of Commons of Canada as a Liberal from 1896 to 1900.

He was born in Cornwall Township in Upper Canada in 1833. He owned a gristmill and general store in the town of Moulinette. Snetsinger served as reeve for the township in 1869. He was elected to the Ontario legislature in an 1872 by-election and reelected in 1875. In 1896, he was elected to the federal parliament. He successfully lobbied the federal government for a small railway station on the Grand Trunk Railway line in Moulinette. He died in New York City in 1909 while visiting.

He was the maternal grandfather and a significant presence in the upbringing of travel writer M. Wylie Blanchet.

The town of Moulinette was permanently flooded during the building of the Saint Lawrence Seaway.

== Electoral history ==
Ontario provincial by-election, July 16, 1872: Cornwall Death of John Sandfield Macdonald
Party	Candidate	Votes	%
Liberal	John Goodall Snetsinger	410	57.83
Independent	Mr. Amable	299	42.17
Total valid votes		709	100.0
Liberal gain from Conservative			
Source: History of the Electoral Districts, Legislatures and Ministries of the Province of Ontario

1875 Ontario general election: Cornwall
Party	Candidate	Votes	%	±%
Conservative	Alexander Fraser McIntyre	499	50.25	
Liberal	John Goodall Snetsinger	494	49.75	−8.08
Turnout		993	68.44	
Eligible voters		1,451		
Election voided
Source: Elections Ontario

Ontario provincial by-election, 1875: Cornwall Previous election voided
Party	Candidate	Votes	%	±%
Liberal	John Goodall Snetsinger	481	50.42	−7.41
Conservative	Alexander Fraser McIntyre	473	49.58	
Total valid votes		954		
Liberal hold		Swing		−7.41
Source: History of the Electoral Districts, Legislatures and Ministries of the Province of Ontario
