= Luc Guindon =

Canadian politician

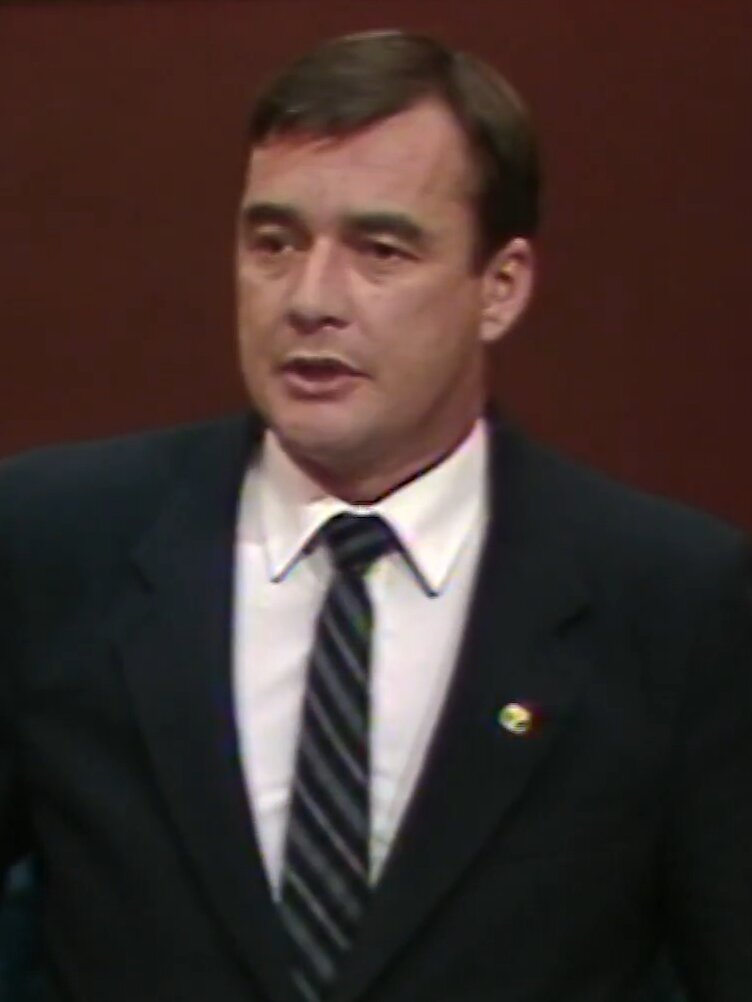
- Guindon in 1986

Ontario MPP
- In office 1985–1987
- Preceded by: George Samis
- Succeeded by: John Cleary
- Constituency: Cornwall

Personal details
- Born: July 31, 1943 (age 82) Hull, Quebec
- Party: Progressive Conservative
- Spouse: Nicole Germaine Ladouceur
- Relations: Fernand Guindon, (father)
- Profession: Businessman

Luc Bernard Guindon (born July 31, 1943) is a Justice of the peace and former politician in Ontario, Canada. He served in the Legislative Assembly of Ontario from 1985 to 1987, as a member of the Progressive Conservative Party.

== Background ==
Guindon was born in Hull, Quebec, the son of Fernand Guindon and Claire Marie Rouette, and educated in Apple Hill, Ontario and Montreal, Quebec. He operated a family service station business from 1963 to the 1980s. In 1966, he married Nicole Germaine Ladouceur. Guindon is a member of the Knights of Columbus.

== Politics ==
He was elected to the Ontario legislature in the 1985 provincial election, defeating Liberal candidate Claude Poirier by 3,046 votes in Cornwall. The Progressive Conservatives won a minority government in this election, and Guindon briefly served as a backbench supporter of Frank Miller's government before it was defeated in the house. In opposition, Guindon served as his party's critic for Francophone Affairs and Intergovernmental Affairs.

He was defeated in the 1987 election, losing to Liberal John Cleary by 1,586 votes.

== Later life ==
He worked with an independent gasoline retailer in the 1990s. Guindon was appointed to Ontario's Assessment Review Board in 2000. In early 2003, he was appointed a justice of the peace in the Ontario Court of Justice.
