= Ministry of Citizenship and Multiculturalism (Ontario) =

Canadian provincial ministry

Coordinates: 43°39′37.8″N 79°23′4.2″W

- French: Ministère de la Citoyenneté et du Multiculturalisme
- Government of Ontario wordmark

Government ministry overview
- Formed: 2003
- Jurisdiction: Government of Ontario
- Headquarters: 6th Floor, 400 University Avenue, Toronto, Ontario
- Minister responsible: Graham McGregor, Minister of Citizenship and Multiculturalism
- Website: ontario.ca/page/ministry-citizenship-and-multiculturalism

The Ministry of Citizenship and Multiculturalism is a ministry of the Government of Ontario that is responsible for citizenship and multiculturalism issues in the Canadian province of Ontario. From 2014 to 2016, it was known as the Ministry of Citizenship, Immigration and International Trade, then the ministry was reorganized and it reverted to its prior name. The Ministry of Citizenship and Immigration was dissolved in 2018, and its functions were taken over by the Ministry of Children, Community and Social Services. In 2021, the ministry was reintroduced as the Ministry of Citizenship and Multiculturalism. The current minister is Graham McGregor.

== 2007 spending controversy ==
In 2007, the Ministry of Citizenship of Immigration was accused of using immigrant aid money as a slush fund by directing it to groups with strong Liberal ties. The Ontario Auditor General probed $32 million of spending over a 2-year period and found no direct evidence of money flowing due to political ties, but that political ties did exist and there were various governance deficiencies.

== List of ministers ==
Portrait	Name	Term of office		Tenure	Political party (Ministry)	Note
Provincial Secretary and Minister of Citizenship					PC (Robarts)	
	John Yaremko	November 8, 1961	November 24, 1966	5 years, 16 days	PC (Robarts)	
	Bob Welch	November 24, 1966	March 1, 1971	4 years, 97 days	PC (Robarts)	
	John Yaremko	March 1, 1971	July 1, 1983	8 years, 182 days	PC (Davis)	After 1972 the responsibility of Citizenship affairs was transferred to the Ministry of Citizenship and Culture when it was formed in 1982.
Citizenship and Culture					PC (Davis)	
	Bruce McCaffrey	February 13, 1982	July 6, 1983	1 year, 143 days	PC (Davis)	
	Susan Fish	July 6, 1983	February 8, 1985	1 year, 299 days	PC (Davis)	
	Susan Fish	February 8, 1985	May 1, 1985	1 year, 299 days	PC (Miller)	
	Nick Leluk	May 1, 1985	June 26, 1985	56 days	PC (Miller)	
	Lily Oddie Munro	June 26, 1985	September 29, 1987	2 years, 95 days	Liberal (Peterson)	
Citizenship					Liberal (Peterson)	
	Gerry Phillips	September 29, 1987	August 2, 1989	1 year, 307 days	Liberal (Peterson)	
	Bob Wong	August 2, 1989	October 1, 1990	1 year, 60 days	Liberal (Peterson)	
	Elaine Ziemba	October 1, 1990	June 26, 1995	4 years, 268 days	NDP (Rae)	
Citizenship, Culture and Recreation					PC (Harris)	
	Marilyn Mushinski	June 26, 1995	October 10, 1997	2 years, 106 days	PC (Harris)	
	Isabel Bassett	October 10, 1997	June 17, 1999	1 year, 250 days	PC (Harris)	
	Helen Johns	June 17, 1999	February 8, 2001	1 year, 236 days	PC (Harris)	
Citizenship					PC (Harris)	
	Cam Jackson	February 8, 2001	April 15, 2002	1 year, 66 days	PC (Harris)	
	Carl DeFaria	April 15, 2002	October 22, 2003	1 year, 190 days	PC (Eves)	
Citizenship and Immigration					Liberal (McGuinty)	
	Marie Bountrogianni	October 23, 2003	June 29, 2005	1 year, 249 days	Liberal (McGuinty)	
	Michael Colle	June 29, 2005	June 26, 2007	1 year, 362 days	Liberal (McGuinty)	
	Gerry Phillips	June 26, 2007	October 30, 2007	126 days	Liberal (McGuinty)	
	Michael Chan	October 30, 2007	January 18, 2010	2 years, 80 days	Liberal (McGuinty)	
	Eric Hoskins	January 18, 2010	October 20, 2011	1 year, 275 days	Liberal (McGuinty)	
	Charles Sousa	October 20, 2011	November 13, 2012	1 year, 24 days	Liberal (McGuinty)	
	Michael Chan	November 13, 2012	February 11, 2013	90 days	Liberal (McGuinty)	
	Michael Coteau	February 11, 2013	June 24, 2014	1 year, 133 days	Liberal (Wynne)	
Citizenship, Immigration and International Trade					Liberal (Wynne)	
	Michael Chan	June 24, 2014	June 13, 2016	1 year, 355 days	Liberal (Wynne)	
Citizenship and Immigration					Liberal (Wynne)	
	Laura Albanese	June 13, 2016	June 29, 2018	2 years, 16 days	Liberal (Wynne)	
Citizenship and Multiculturalism					PC (Ford)	
	Parm Gill	June 21, 2021	June 24, 2022	1 year, 3 days	PC (Ford)	Premier Ford does not have a Citizenship Minister in his cabinet for nearly three years
	Michael Ford	June 24, 2022	March 19, 2025	2 years, 268 days	PC (Ford)	
	Graham McGregor	March 19, 2025	present	1 year, 197 days	PC (Ford)	

== See also ==
- Provincial Secretary and Registrar of Ontario
- Citizenship and Immigration Canada
- Fairness Commissioner (Ontario)
- Immigration to Canada
