= Nolan Quinn =

Canadian politician

The Honourable Nolan Quinn ECO MPP
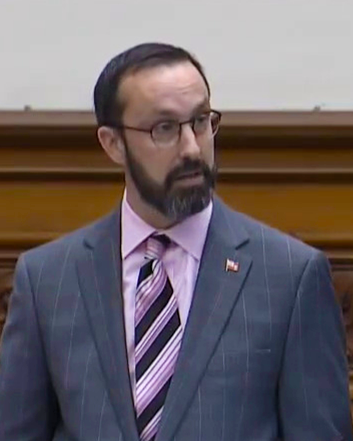
- Quinn in 2024

Minister of Colleges, Universities, Research Excellence and Security
- Incumbent
- Assumed office August 16, 2024
- Premier: Doug Ford
- Preceded by: Jill Dunlop

Associate Minister of Forestry
- In office June 6, 2024 – August 16, 2024
- Succeeded by: Kevin Holland

Member of the Ontario Provincial Parliament for Stormont—Dundas—South Glengarry
- Incumbent
- Assumed office June 2, 2022
- Preceded by: Jim McDonell

Personal details
- Party: Progressive Conservative

Nolan Quinn (born June 3, 1983) is a Canadian politician who is a current member of the Legislative Assembly of Ontario and of the Ford ministry, the Progressive Conservative Party cabinet of the Government of Ontario currently in office.

== Background ==
Quinn described himself as a local businessman who owns Cornwall’s Dairy Queen when he first sought electoral office in 2022.

== Political career ==
The Progressive Conservative Party of Ontario's nomination for Stormont—Dundas—South Glengarry became open in 2022 upon the retirement of three-term incumbent MPP Jim McDonell. Quinn defeated South Stormont councillor Andrew Guindon in the nomination contest held in March 2022 and won the seat in the subsequent general election.

Quinn was one of five MPPs elevated into the Ford Ministry in a major cabinet shuffle in June 2024. He entered cabinet as a minister without portfolio, and was assigned to be Associate Minister of Forestry under natural resource minister Graydon Smith.

After less than two months as a junior minister, Quinn was given a significant promotion when cabinet veteran Todd Smith resigned from the ministry and from the legislature. Despite the Progressive Conservative Party holding all but one seat between Greater Toronto and the National Capital Region, Smith's resignation reduced the number of cabinet members from Eastern Ontario down to two. In the ensuring cabinet shuffle in August 2024, Quinn was appointed Minister of Colleges, Universities, Research Excellence and Security, helming the ministry with the fourth largest budget in the Ontario government.

== Electoral history ==
2025 Ontario general election: Stormont—Dundas—South Glengarry
| Party | Candidate | Votes | % | ±% |
|---|---|---|---|---|
| Progressive Conservative | Nolan Quinn | 23,221 | 62.03 | +4.53 |
| Liberal | Devon Monkhouse | 7,254 | 19.11 | +1.23 |
| New Democratic | Jeremy Rose | 4,726 | 12.38 | -1.42 |
| Green | Nicholas Lapierre | 980 | 2.52 | -1.57 |
| New Blue | Stefan Kohut | 818 | 2.11 | -2.15 |
| Ontario Party | Brigitte Sugrue | 715 | 1.85 | -0.62 |
| Total valid votes/expense limit | | 38,443 | 99.25 | –0.16 |
| Total rejected, unmarked, and declined ballots | | 290 | 0.75 | +0.16 |
| Turnout | | 38,733 | | |
| Eligible voters | | | | |
| Progressive Conservative hold | | Swing | | +1.65 |
Source: Elections Ontario

2022 Ontario general election: Stormont—Dundas—South Glengarry
| Party | Candidate | Votes | % | ±% | Expenditures |
|---|---|---|---|---|---|
| Progressive Conservative | Nolan Quinn | 20,766 | 57.50 | −4.01 | $84,981 |
| Liberal | Kirsten J. Gardner | 6,458 | 17.88 | +5.51 | $24,320 |
| New Democratic | Wendy Stephen | 4,982 | 13.80 | −7.83 | $16,486 |
| New Blue | Claude Tardif | 1,538 | 4.26 | | $8,380 |
| Green | Jacqueline Milner | 1,477 | 4.09 | +0.42 | $6,901 |
| Ontario Party | Remi Tremblay | 893 | 2.47 | | $6,290 |
| Total valid votes/expense limit | | 36,114 | 99.41 | +0.48 | $122,485 |
| Total rejected, unmarked, and declined ballots | | 214 | 0.59 | -0.48 | |
| Turnout | | 36,328 | 41.63 | -12.47 | |
| Eligible voters | | 87,489 | | | |
| Progressive Conservative hold | | Swing | | −4.76 | |
Source(s): "Summary of Valid Votes Cast for Each Candidate" (PDF). Elections Ontario. 2022. Archived from the original on 2023-05-18.; "Statistical Summary by Electoral District" (PDF). Elections Ontario. 2022. Archived from the original on 2023-05-21.
