= John Cleary (Canadian politician) =

Canadian politician

Ontario MPP
- In office 1999–2003
- Preceded by: New riding
- Succeeded by: Jim Brownell
- Constituency: Stormont—Dundas—Charlottenburgh
- In office 1987–1999
- Preceded by: Luc Guindon
- Succeeded by: Riding abolished
- Constituency: Cornwall

Personal details
- Born: August 31, 1932 Cornwall, Ontario
- Died: October 7, 2012 (aged 80)
- Party: Liberal

John Cleary (August 31, 1932 – October 7, 2012) was a politician in Ontario, Canada. He was a Liberal member of the Legislative Assembly of Ontario from 1987 to 2003 who represented the ridings of Cornwall and Stormont—Dundas—Charlottenburgh.

== Background ==
Cleary was born in Cornwall, Ontario, and was educated at St. Lawrence College. Elected as a councillor in Cornwall Township in 1972, he became the township's deputy reeve in 1974 and its reeve in 1976, serving in the latter capacity until 1987. He was chosen as warden for his region in 1983, and also served on the regional conservation authority from 1974 to 1987. Cleary died on October 7, 2012, in Cornwall and survived by his wife Elizabeth.

== Politics ==
Cleary was elected to the Ontario legislature in the 1987 provincial election, defeating Progressive Conservative incumbent Luc Guindon in the Cornwall riding by about 1,000 votes. The Liberals won a majority government in this region, and Cleary served as a government backbencher for the next three years. The Liberals were defeated by the Ontario New Democratic Party in the 1990 election, although Cleary managed to retain his own riding by an increased margin. In opposition, he served as his party's Agriculture Critic for the next five years. The Progressive Conservatives won a majority government in the 1995 election, though Cleary managed to increase his majority again in Cornwall. He continued serving as his party's agriculture critic until 1996, when he was shifted to rural affairs.

Cleary faced the most difficult re-election battle of his career in the provincial election of 1999, in which redistribution forced him to face longstanding Progressive Conservative MP Noble Villeneuve in the riding of Stormont—Dundas—Charlottenburgh. Cleary eventually won the contest by 630 votes; most of the urban vote favoured him, while most of the rural vote favoured Villeneuve. He continued serving as his party's rural affairs critic until 2003, when he retired from the legislature. He also supported calls for a public inquiry into reports of an organized child sex ring in the Cornwall area.

Although not a skilled public speaker or a leading figure in the Liberal Party, Cleary was generally regarded as a good community representative during his time in the legislature. He was not considered to be an especially partisan figure, and in fact criticized party leader Dalton McGuinty for his personal attacks on Mike Harris in 1999. Cleary also held socially conservative views on some issues, including abortion.
