= Jim Brownell =

Canadian politician

Ontario MPP
- In office 2007–2011
- Preceded by: New riding
- Succeeded by: Jim McDonell
- Constituency: Stormont—Dundas—South Glengarry
- In office 2003–2007
- Preceded by: John Cleary
- Succeeded by: Riding abolished
- Constituency: Stormont—Dundas—Charlottenburgh

Personal details
- Born: 29 January 1948 (age 78)
- Party: Liberal
- Occupation: Teacher

Jim Brownell (born 29 January 1948) is a former politician in Ontario, Canada. He was a Liberal member of the Legislative Assembly of Ontario from 2003 to 2011. One of his distant ancestors, John Brownell, represented the same general region in the Upper Canadian parliament from 1808 to 1809.

== Background ==
Brownell has a Bachelor of Arts degree, a Bachelor of Education degree, and a Master of Education degree from the University of Ottawa. He was a teacher with the Upper Canada District School Board for thirty-two years. In 1992 completed the principal's qualification program at Queen's University. He has been involved with many local organizations, including the Lost Villages Historical Society and Museum. In 2002, he was awarded a Queen Elizabeth Golden Jubilee Medal by his community.

== Politics ==
Brownell served for fourteen years as a councillor, deputy reeve and reeve in Cornwall Township and South Stormont Township.

Incumbent Stormont-Dundas-Charlottenburgh Liberal MPP John Cleary retired before the 2003 provincial election. Brownell won the party nomination to take his place as Liberal candidate. Although the election was expected to be close, he defeated Progressive Conservative Todd Lalonde by about 5500 votes. On May 21, 2004, he was appointed parliamentary assistant to George Smitherman, the Minister of Health and Long-Term Care. He then served as the parliamentary assistant to the Minister of Tourism, Monique Smith.

In the 2007 provincial election he was re-elected over PC candidate Chris Savard by 3,866 votes. In 2009 he was appointed as parliamentary assistant to the Minister of Consumer Services. On November 19, 2010, he announced that he would not run in the 2011 election.

== Electoral record ==
2007 Ontario general election
Party	Candidate	Votes	%	±%
Liberal	Jim Brownell	18,609	48.8	-2.38
Progressive Conservative	Chris Savard	14,782	38.8	2.3
New Democratic	Lori Taylor	2,795	7.3	3.01
Green	Elaine Kennedy	1,678	4.4	-1.09
Family Coalition	Lukas Bebjak	249	0.7	

2003 Ontario general election
Party	Candidate	Votes	%	±%
Liberal	Jim Brownell	19,558	51.18	+3.19
Progressive Conservative	Todd Lalonde	13,948	36.5	-9.97
Green	Tom Manley	2,098	5.49	
New Democratic	Matt Z. Sumegi	1639	4.29	-0.47
Independent	Gary Besner	968	2.53	
