= Ministry of Citizenship, Immigration and International Trade =

Coordinates: 43°39′37.8″N 79°23′4.2″W

- Ministère des Affaires civiques, de l'Immigration et du Commerce international

Government ministry overview
- Formed: 2014
- Dissolved: 2016
- Superseding Government ministry: Ministry of Citizenship and Multiculturalism (2021)
- Jurisdiction: Government of Ontario
- Headquarters: 6th Floor, 400 University Avenue, Toronto, Ontario

The Ministry of Citizenship, Immigration and International Trade was a ministry of the Government of Ontario that was responsible for citizenship, immigration and international trade issues in the Canadian province of Ontario. The ministry existed from 2014 to 2016, with Michael Chan as the Minister of Citizenship, Immigration and International Trade.

The ministry's predecessor and successor for citizenship and immigration issues was known as the Ministry of Citizenship and Immigration. For international trade issues, the ministry's predecessor was the Ministry of Economic Development, Trade and Employment, and its successor was the Ministry of International Trade.

== See also ==
- Ministry of Citizenship and Multiculturalism, the superseding and current ministry reintroduced in 2021
- Citizenship and Immigration Canada
- Immigration to Canada
