= York South—Weston (provincial electoral district) =

Provincial electoral district in Ontario, Canada

Coordinates: 43.690°N 79.487°W

Ontario electoral district
- York South–Weston in relation to the other Toronto ridings

Provincial electoral district
- Legislature: Legislative Assembly of Ontario
MPP
Mohamed Firin
Progressive Conservative
- District created: 1996
- First contested: 1999
- Last contested: 2025

Demographics
- Population (2016): 116,690
- Electors (2018): 76,772
- Area (km²): 25
- Pop. density (per km²): 4,667.6
- Census division: Toronto
- Census subdivision: Toronto

York South—Weston is a provincial electoral district in Toronto, Ontario, Canada, that has been represented in the Legislative Assembly of Ontario since 1999. Its Member of Provincial Parliament is Progressive Conservative Mohamed Firin.

== Geography ==
It is in the west-end of Toronto. The riding has a largely working class and immigrant population. The riding is made up largely of the old city of York, a southwestern portion of the old city of North York, and parts of the old city of Toronto north of High Park.

It consists of the part of the city of Toronto bounded by a line drawn from Humber River east along Highway 401, south along the Canadian National Railway situated west of Caledonia Road, west along Rogers Road, southeast along Old Weston Road, west along Lavender Road, south along Keele Street, southeast along the Canadian National/Canadian Pacific Railway, west along the Canadian Pacific Railway, and north along the Humber River to Highway 401.

== History ==
The provincial electoral district was created in 1999 when provincial ridings were defined to have the same borders as federal ridings. Prior to that redistribution, the area included York South and parts of what are now Parkdale-High Park, Davenport, and Eglinton-Lawrence. They became law after Bill 214 (2005), otherwise known as the "Representations Act, 2005", was passed in the Ontario Legislature. The October 10, 2007 provincial election was conducted using the new boundaries, with only minor changes to the boundaries in the south-east corner of the riding, along the border with the Davenport riding.

=== 1999 electoral district description ===
York South—Weston consisting of those parts of the cities of North York, Toronto and York described as follows: commencing at the intersection of the westerly limit of the city of North York with the Macdonald-Cartier Freeway (Highway No. 401); thence easterly along the Macdonald-Cartier Freeway to the Canadian National Railway situated immediately west of Caledonia Road; thence southerly along said railway to Rogers Road; thence westerly along Rogers Road to Old Weston Road; thence southerly along Old Weston Road to the northerly limit of the city of Toronto; thence westerly along the northerly limit of the city of Toronto to the Canadian National Railway; thence southeasterly along said railway to the Canadian Pacific Railway; thence westerly along the Canadian Pacific Railway to the westerly limit of the city of York; thence generally northerly along the westerly limit of the cities of York and North York to the point of commencement.

== Members of Provincial Parliament ==
York South—Weston
Assembly	Years	Member	Party
Riding created
37th	1999–2003	Joe Cordiano	Liberal
38th	2003–2007	Joe Cordiano	Liberal
38th	2007–2007	Paul Ferreira	New Democratic
39th	2007–2011	Laura Albanese	Liberal
40th	2011–2014	Laura Albanese	Liberal
41st	2014–2018	Laura Albanese	Liberal
42nd	2018–2022	Faisal Hassan	New Democratic
43rd	2022–2025	Michael Ford	Progressive Conservative
44th	2025–present	Mohamed Firin	Progressive Conservative
Sourced from the Ontario Legislative Assembly

== Election results ==
Winning party in each polling division of York South—Weston riding at the 2025 Ontario general election

2025 Ontario general election
Party	Candidate	Votes	%	±%	Expenditures
Progressive Conservative	Mohamed Firin	11,142	35.15	–1.45	$71,556
Liberal	Daniel Di Giorgio	10,940	34.70	+10.46	$42,110
New Democratic	Faisal Hassan	8,101	25.56	–8.42	$95,418
Green	Lilian Barrera	844	2.66	+0.13	$0
New Blue	Viktor Ehikwe	396	1.25	+0.12	$4,033
Independent	K. Ann Thomas	213	0.68	N/A	
Total valid votes/expense limit		31,698	99.10	–0.02	$133,163
Total rejected, unmarked, and declined ballots		287	0.90	+0.02	
Turnout		31,985	39.00	+0.89	
Eligible voters		82,019			
Progressive Conservative hold		Swing		–5.96	
Source: Elections Ontario

Winning party in each polling division of York South—Weston riding at the 2022 Ontario general election

2022 Ontario general election
Party	Candidate	Votes	%	±%	Expenditures
Progressive Conservative	Michael Ford	11,138	36.60	+3.65	$69,685
New Democratic	Faisal Hassan	10,342	33.98	−2.09	$97,063
Liberal	Nadia Guerrera	7,377	24.24	−3.59	$82,208
Green	Ignacio Mongrell Gonzalez	770	2.53	−0.01	$0
New Blue	Tom Hipsz	345	1.13		$0
Ontario Party	Ana Gabriela Ortiz	251	0.82		$217
Independent	James Michael Fields	209	0.69		$632
Total valid votes/expense limit		30,432	99.12	+0.31	$112,794
Total rejected, unmarked, and declined ballots		271	0.88	−0.31	
Turnout		30,703	38.11	−11.06	
Eligible voters		80,336			
Progressive Conservative gain from New Democratic		Swing		+2.87	
Source(s): "Summary of Valid Votes Cast for Each Candidate" (PDF). Elections Ontario. 2022. Archived from the original on May 18, 2023.; "Statistical Summary by Electoral District" (PDF). Elections Ontario. 2022. Archived from the original on May 21, 2023.

2018 Ontario general election
Party	Candidate	Votes	%	±%
New Democratic	Faisal Hassan	13,455	36.07	-1.18
Progressive Conservative	Mark DeMontis	12,290	32.95	+21.69
Liberal	Laura Albanese	10,379	27.83	-20.02
Green	Grad Murray	946	2.54	+0.10
Libertarian	Bonnie Hu	228	0.61	
Total valid votes		37,298	98.81	
Total rejected, unmarked and declined ballots		449	1.19	-0.03
Turnout		37,747	49.17	+3.03
Eligible voters		76,772		
New Democratic gain from Liberal		Swing		+9.42
Source: Elections Ontario

2014 Ontario general election
Party	Candidate	Votes	%	±%
Liberal	Laura Albanese	15,669	47.85	+3.30
New Democratic	Paul Ferreira	12,200	37.25	-4.93
Progressive Conservative	Andrew Ffrench	3,687	11.26	+0.16
Green	Jessica Higgins	797	2.43	+0.90
Freedom	Eric Compton	249	0.76	+0.27
Independent	Abi Issa	146	0.45	
Total valid votes		32,748	100.0	
Total rejected, unmarked and declined ballots		404	1.22	
Turnout		33,152	46.13	
Eligible voters		71,860		
Liberal hold		Swing		+4.11

2011 Ontario general election
Party	Candidate	Votes	%	±%
Liberal	Laura Albanese	13,805	44.55	+1.61
New Democratic	Paul Ferreira	13,071	42.18	+0.64
Progressive Conservative	Lan Daniel	3,441	11.10	+1.26
Green	Keith Jarrett	474	1.53	-2.27
Freedom	Eric Compton	151	0.49	
Independent	Michael Radejewski	45	0.15	
Total valid votes		30,987	100.00	
Total rejected, unmarked and declined ballots		227	0.73	
Turnout		31,214	44.86	
Eligible voters		69,580		
Liberal hold		Swing		+0.49
Source(s) "Official return from the records / Rapport des registres officiel - York South—Weston" (PDF). Elections Ontario. 2011.

2007 Ontario general election
Party	Candidate	Votes	%	±%
Liberal	Laura Albanese	13,846	42.94	+1.50
New Democratic	Paul Ferreira	13,394	41.54	-1.79
Progressive Conservative	Karen McMillan-Aver	3,173	9.84	-0.43
Green	Anthony Gratl	1,226	3.80	+2.41
Libertarian	Marco Dias	385	1.19	+0.67
Family Coalition	Mariangela Sanabria	218	0.68	-0.06
Total valid votes		32,242	100.0	
Total rejected, unmarked and declined ballots		433	1.33	
Turnout		32,675	46.34	
Eligible voters		70,518		
Liberal gain from New Democratic		Swing		+1.64
Source(s) Elections Ontario (2007). "General Election Poll By Poll Results: 106 York South-Weston" (PDF).

Ontario provincial by-election, February 8, 2007 Resignation of Joseph Cordiano
Party	Candidate	Votes	%	±%
New Democratic	Paul Ferreira	8,146	43.33	+24.04
Liberal	Laura Albanese	7,831	41.44	−20.12
Progressive Conservative	Pina Martino	1,917	10.27	−4.96
Green	Mir Kamal	263	1.39	−1.06
Independent	Kevin Clarke	220	1.16	
Independent	Mohammed Choudhary	142	0.75	
Family Coalition	Mariangela Sanabria	134	0.74	−0.73
Libertarian	Nunzio Venuto	101	0.52	
Freedom	Wayne Simmons	77	0.41	
Total valid votes		18,831	100.0	
Total rejected, unmarked and declined ballots		146	0.77	
Turnout		18,977	28.62	
Eligible voters		66,308		
New Democratic gain from Liberal		Swing		+22.08
Source(s) Elections Ontario (2007). "By-Election 2007: Summary of Valid Ballots Cast for Each Candidate".

2003 Ontario general election
Party	Candidate	Votes	%	±%
Liberal	Joseph Cordiano	19,932	61.56	+8.17
New Democratic	Brian Donlevy	6,247	19.29	-0.80
Progressive Conservative	Stephen Halicki	4,930	15.23	-6.68
Green	Enrique Palad	794	2.45	+2.02
Family Coalition	Mariangela Sanabria	475	1.47	-0.12
Total valid votes		32,378	100.0	
Total rejected, unmarked and declined ballots		540	1.56	
Turnout		32,747	50.70	
Eligible voters		64,589		
Liberal hold		Swing		+4.48
Source(s) Elections Ontario (2003). "General Election of October 2, 2003 Poll By Poll Results: 102 York South-Weston".

1999 Ontario general election
Party	Candidate	Votes	%
Liberal	Joseph Cordiano	18,205	53.39
Progressive Conservative	Alan Hofmeister	7,471	21.91
New Democratic	Rosana Pellizzari	6,850	20.09
Family Coalition	Enzo Granzotto	542	1.59
Independent	David Gershuny	486	1.43
Communist	Hassan Husseini	261	0.77
Green	Alma Subasic	147	0.43
Natural Law	Erica Kindl	139	0.41
Total valid votes		34,101	100.0
Total rejected, unmarked and declined ballots		540	1.56
Turnout		34,641	58.23
Eligible voters		59,490	
Source(s) Elections Ontario (1999). "General Election of June 3 1999 Poll By Poll Results: 102 York South-Weston".

== 2007 electoral reform referendum ==
2007 Ontario electoral reform referendum
Side	Votes	%
First Past the Post	16,842	56.4
Mixed member proportional	12,998	43.6
Total valid votes	29,840	100.0

== See also ==
- List of Ontario provincial electoral districts
- Canadian provincial electoral districts
