= Paul Ferreira =

Canadian politician

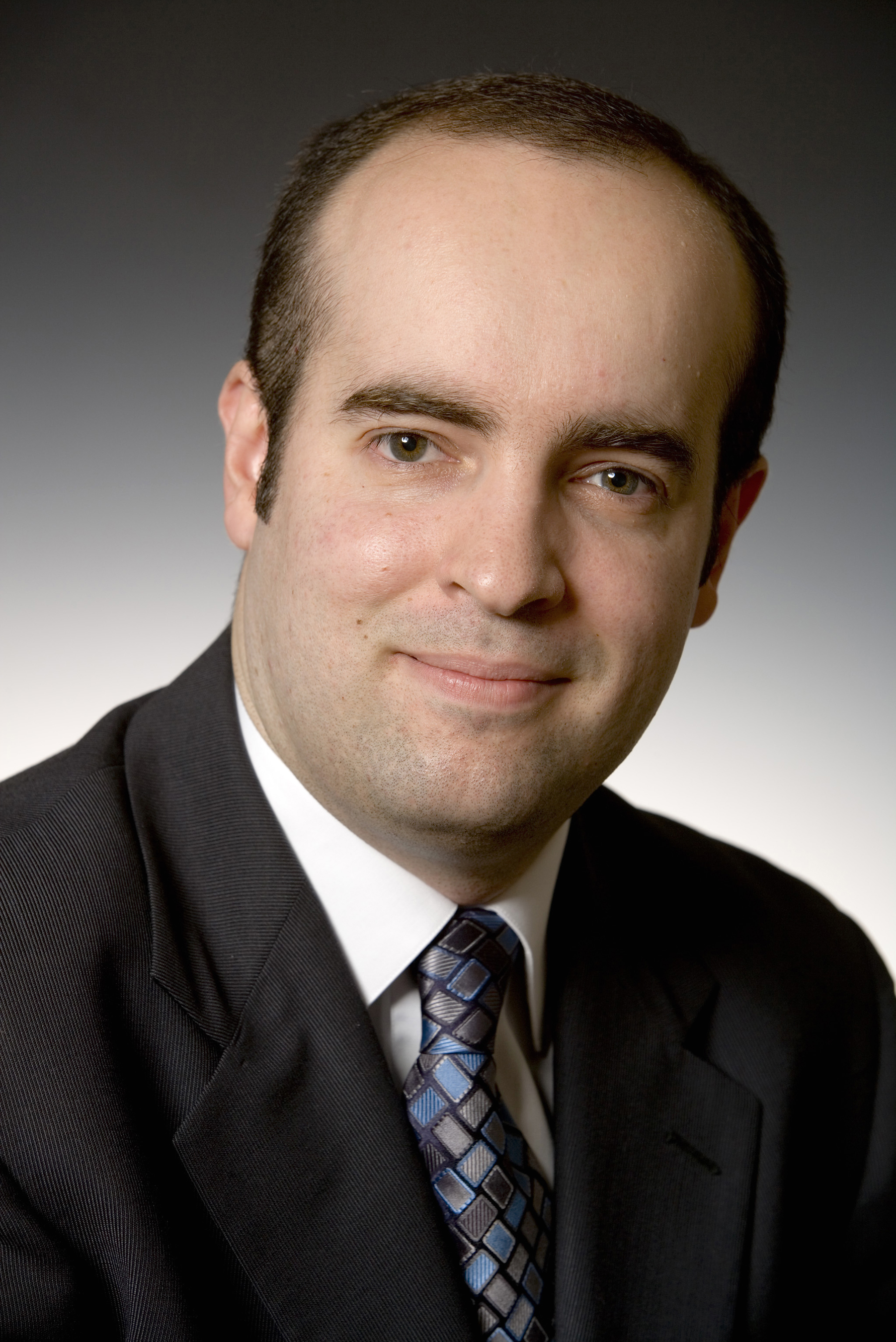

MPP for York South—Weston
- In office February 28, 2007 – September 30, 2007
- Preceded by: Joe Cordiano
- Succeeded by: Laura Albanese

Personal details
- Born: 1973 (age 52–53) Azores, Portugal
- Party: New Democratic Party (1990-2016); Independent (2016-)
- Occupation: Public relations

Paul Ferreira (born in 1973) is a Canadian politician and one of the first openly gay politicians elected to provincial office in Canada. He also has the distinction of being the very first Azorean-Canadian MPP. He was elected to the Legislative Assembly of Ontario as a member of the Ontario New Democratic Party (NDP) in the February 8, 2007 York South–Weston by-election, but was narrowly defeated in the 2007 general election. He subsequently served as chief of staff to party leader Howard Hampton until Hampton's retirement from that position in 2009. He later worked as a special assistant to leader Andrea Horwath. On Feb. 8, 2011, Ferreira was acclaimed as the Ontario NDP's candidate in York South-Weston in the 2011 provincial election.

== Early life and education ==
Paul Ferreira was born in the Azores. Along with his family, he immigrated to Canada in 1979. They settled in Brampton, Ontario. He attended primary and secondary schools in the Brampton area and went on to study and graduate from Ottawa's Carleton University. Ferreira is an honours graduate of Carleton University's School of Journalism, where he received awards for academic excellence and community involvement. He speaks English, French and Portuguese.

== Involvement with the NDP ==
Ferreira's parents—Gilberto and Filomena—were active trade unionists, and he followed their example by becoming a United Food and Commercial Workers union steward at a local drugstore while still in high school. His union experience attracted him to the NDP. Since 1990, Ferreira has held numerous positions in the NDP. He was Vice President of Outreach for the New Democratic Youth of Canada from 1997 to 1999, he served on the Ontario NDP's executive from 2002 to 2004 and he was co-chair of the party's LGBT Committee for a number of years. He has also been active with numerous community groups. Ferreira left the NDP in 2016 stating that the party had become "fundamentally dishonest" and that "the party has "lost its way" by erecting "reactionary" roadblocks against highway tolls."

== Professional life ==
Professionally, Ferreira served as the manager of member relations with the Canadian Society for Training and Development. He also co-edited the society's national magazine, the Canadian Learning Journal. From 2001 to 2004, Ferreira was part of the management team at one of Canada's largest business intelligence firms. Previously, he was North American manager of public relations for a British-based multinational. He also spent two years as manager of communications and media relations for the North American Broadcasters Association.

== Political life ==
=== First election, 1997 ===
Ferreira got his start as a political activist in 1990 when he joined the New Democratic Party (NDP). After completing a journalism degree at Carleton University in Ottawa, Ferreira returned to Brampton and was the federal NDP candidate in the riding of Brampton Centre in the 1997 election. He finished fourth in the race.

1997 Canadian federal election: Brampton Centre
Party	Candidate	Votes	%
Liberal	Sarkis Assadourian	18,615	48.85
Reform	Don Crawford	10,817	28.39
Progressive Conservative	Sam Hundal	5,621	14.75
New Democratic	Paul Ferreira	2,923	7.67
Marxist–Leninist	André Vachon	127	0.33
Total valid votes		38,103	100.0

=== York South–Weston federal election 2004 ===
In the spring of 2004, Paul Ferreira became the NDP's federal candidate in the west-end Toronto riding of York South—Weston. His main opponent was the incumbent Liberal Member of Parliament (MP) and former Municipality of Metropolitan Toronto chair Alan Tonks. The main issues in the election, and these were not limited to just York South–Weston, included anger over the governing Liberal party's Sponsorship scandal; Health care; and the first budget by the Dalton McGuinty provincial Liberal government, which included the controversial "Ontario Health Premiums" tax.

Despite the many setbacks that confronted the main Liberal campaign, Tonks won the election. Ferreira placed a respectable second. His campaign revived the NDP in York South–Weston and significantly increased the party's share of the vote in the riding to more than 21% (Tom Parkin, the NDP candidate in the 2000 election, received only 3.7% of the vote).

2004 Canadian federal election: York South—Weston
Party	Candidate	Votes	%	±%
Liberal	Alan Tonks	20,537	59.8	+14.2
New Democratic	Paul Ferreira	7,281	21.2	+17.5
Conservative	Stephen Halicki	5,133	14.9	+7.1
Green	Jessica Fracassi	1,199	3.5	+2.6
Communist	Shirley Hawley	175	0.5	+0.1
Total valid votes		34,325		
Note: Conservative vote is compared to the total of the Canadian Alliance vote and Progressive Conservative vote in 2000 election.

=== York South–Weston federal election 2006 ===
Subsequently, he ran again for the same federal office in the 2006 election. The election results were basically a repeat of the previous election, with Tonks finishing first and Ferreira in second place.

2006 Canadian federal election: York South—Weston
Party	Candidate	Votes	%	±%	Expenditures
Liberal	Alan Tonks	22,871	57.06%	−2.77%	$36,134
New Democratic	Paul Ferreira	8,525	21.27%	+0.06%	$24,433
Conservative	Stephen Halicki	6,991	17.44%	+2.49%	$22,529
Green	Maria De Angelis-Pater	1,506	3.76%	+0.26%	$1,003
Independent	Dragan Cimesa	189	0.47%	–	–
Total valid votes		40,082	100.0%		

=== Toronto municipal election, 2006 ===
He was also a candidate for Toronto City Council in the 2006 Toronto municipal election, finishing second in Ward 11.

==== Ward 11 York South—Weston ====
Candidate	Votes	%
Frances Nunziata (incumbent)	6469	49.6
Paul Ferreira	4812	36.9
Rocky Gualtieri	1235	9.5
Pansy Mullings	526	4.0

=== Ontario provincial by-election, 2007 ===
York-South Weston riding map from Elections Ontario.

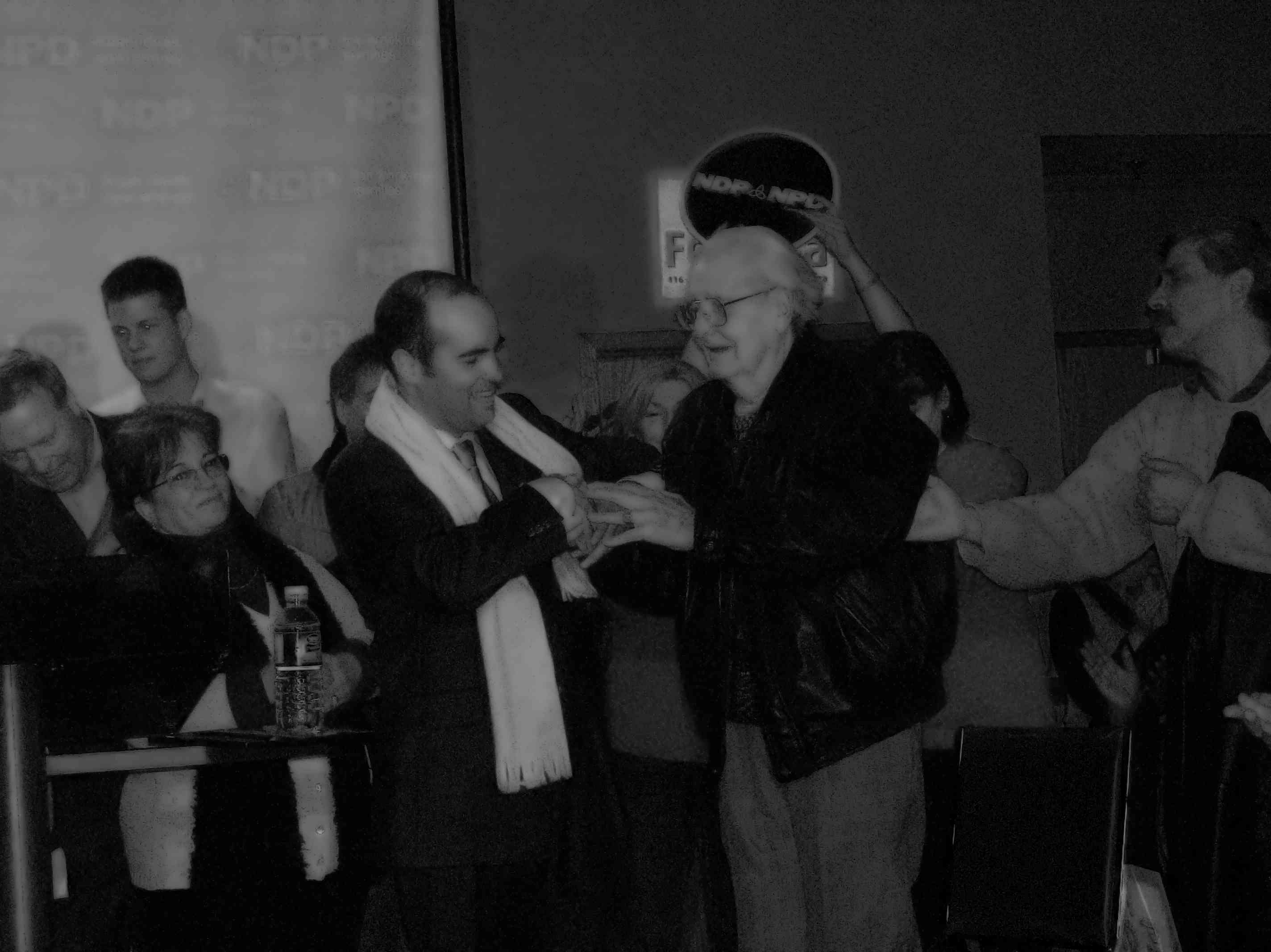
Paul Ferreira receiving congratulations from former NDP leader Donald C. Macdonald on Election Night.

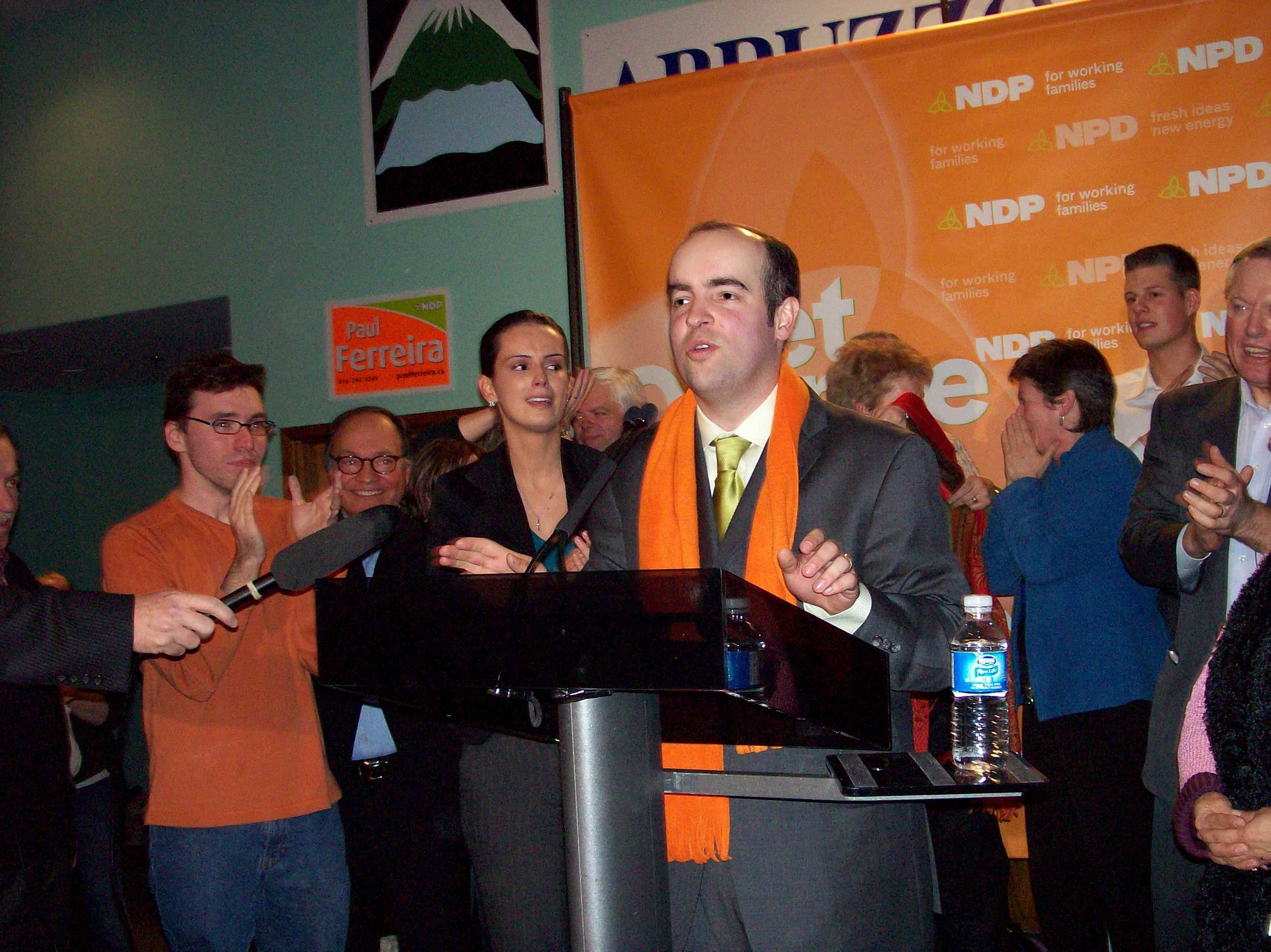
Paul Ferreira speaking at his victory celebration, February 8, 2007

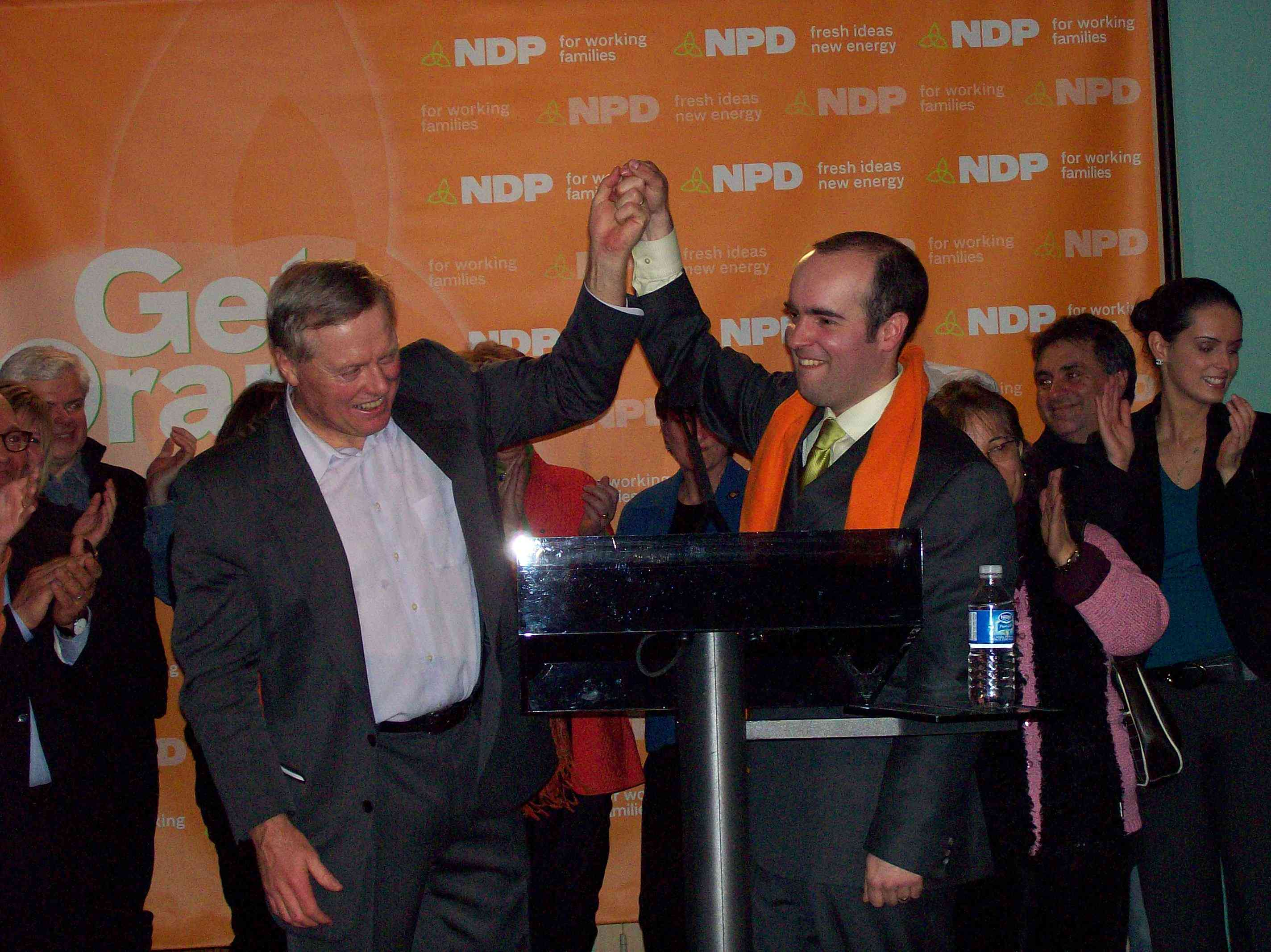
Former NDP Leader Howard Hampton and Paul Ferreira accepting victory in the York south–Weston by-election

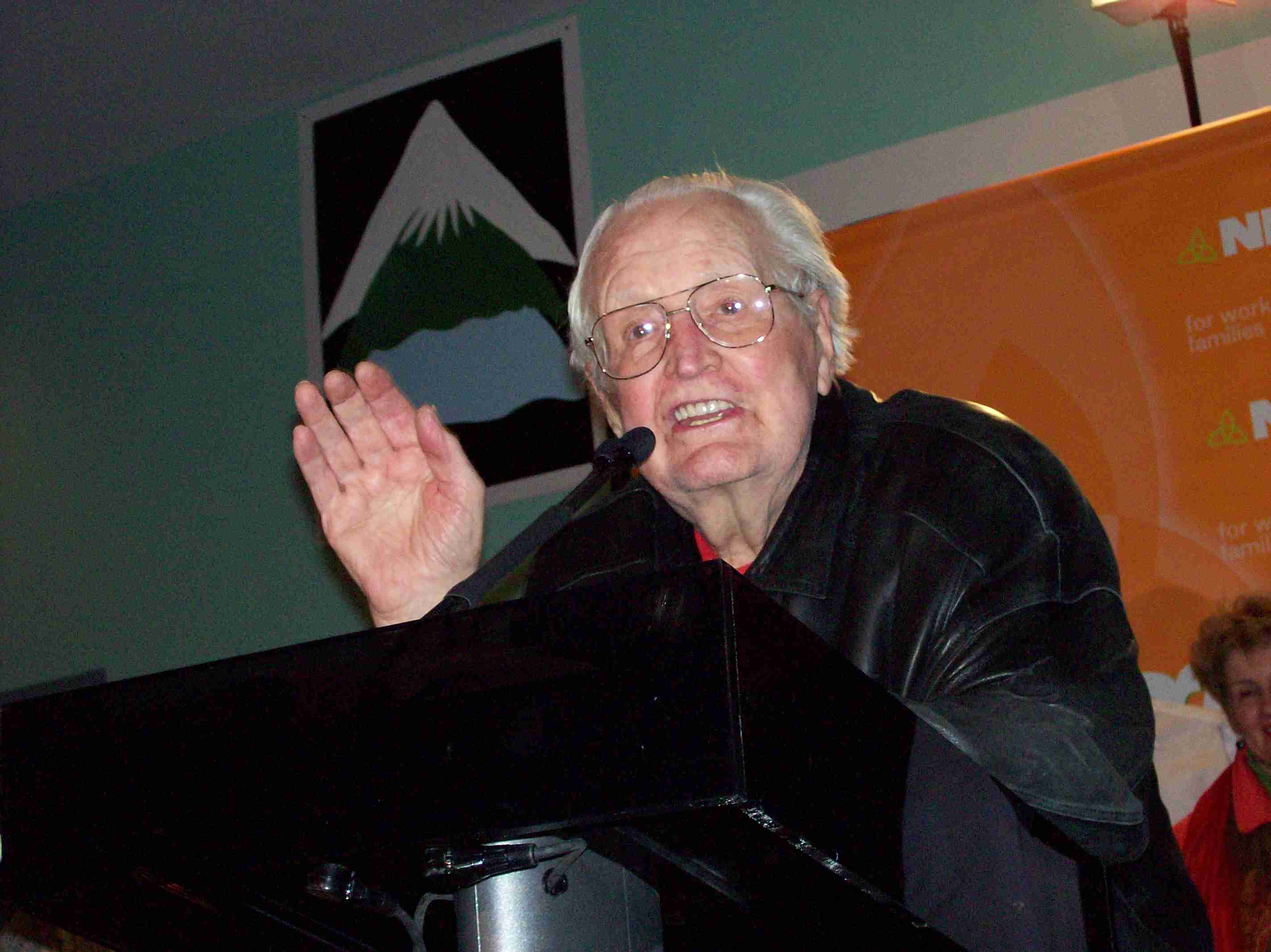
Former NDP Leader Donald C. MacDonald passing-on the symbolic generational torch.

The provincial riding of York South—Weston, which corresponds closely to the boundaries of the federal riding, at the time of the by-election was considered a Liberal stronghold. Historically, the York South part of the riding had been a CCF/NDP stronghold from the mid-1950s starting with Donald C. MacDonald to the mid-1990s with Bob Rae. After Rae resigned from the Legislature, the only NDP candidate that even came close to a victory was David Miller (currently Toronto's mayor, at the time a Metro councillor for Ward One), in the 1996 by-election.

The February 2007 by-election was necessitated by the resignation of former Liberal Member of Provincial Parliament Joe Cordiano, who resigned his seat in the Legislative Assembly of Ontario in the fall of 2006 to spend more time with his family.

At the January 13, 2007 York South–Weston NDP nomination meeting, Ferreira successfully ran against Brian Donlevy to be the Ontario New Democratic Party candidate in the February 8, 2007 by-election. As the party's candidate, he campaigned on the following issues: the $10 hourly minimum wage; the proposed Blue22 train to Toronto Pearson Airport; the recent wage increases to members of the Ontario Legislature.

February 8, 2007 was a very cold day, and that may have been a contributing factor in the low voter turnout. When the polling stations closed at 8:00 p.m., it took two hours to count the ballots and declare Ferreira the winner. At his victory party, Donald C. MacDonald (the former Ontario CCF/NDP leader from the 1953 to 1970 and local area MPP for almost thirty years), joined Ferreira onstage in a symbolic passing of the generational torch ceremony. One of the coincidences of this NDP election victory was, that it came almost exactly 65 years to the day, when the CCF first won York South, in the February 9, 1942 by-election. In that election Joseph Noseworthy won a surprise victory, similar to Ferreira's.

Ontario provincial by-election, February 8, 2007: York South—Weston Resignation of Joseph Cordiano
Party	Candidate	Votes	%	±%
New Democratic	Paul Ferreira	8,146	43.33	+24.04
Liberal	Laura Albanese	7,831	41.44	−20.12
Progressive Conservative	Pina Martino	1,917	10.27	−4.96
Green	Mir Kamal	263	1.39	−1.06
Independent	Kevin Clarke	220	1.16	
Independent	Mohammed Choudhary	142	0.75	
Family Coalition	Mariangela Sanabria	134	0.74	−0.73
Libertarian	Nunzio Venuto	101	0.52	
Freedom	Wayne Simmons	77	0.41	
Total valid votes		18,831	100.0	
Total rejected, unmarked and declined ballots		146	0.77	
Turnout		18,977	28.62	
Eligible voters		66,308		
New Democratic gain from Liberal		Swing		+22.08
Source(s) Elections Ontario (2007). "By-Election 2007: Summary of Valid Ballots Cast for Each Candidate".

On February 19, 2007, Paul Ferreira was sworn in as the tenth member of the NDP caucus in the Ontario Legislature. In the NDP caucus, Ferreira held the critic portfolios for housing, citizenship and immigration.

=== Ontario general election, 2007 ===
York South—Weston is not normally a reliable NDP seat, and the by-election had been marked by low turnout — as a result, going into the general election Ferreira was considered the most vulnerable NDP incumbent.

Ferreira again faced Laura Albanese, the same Liberal candidate as in the by-election. On election night, Albanese defeated Ferreira by a margin of less than 500 votes.

2007 Ontario general election: York South—Weston
Party	Candidate	Votes	%	±%
Liberal	Laura Albanese	13,846	42.94	+1.50
New Democratic	Paul Ferreira	13,394	41.54	-1.79
Progressive Conservative	Karen McMillan-Aver	3,173	9.84	-0.43
Green	Anthony Gratl	1,226	3.80	+2.41
Libertarian	Marco Dias	385	1.19	+0.67
Family Coalition	Mariangela Sanabria	218	0.68	-0.06
Total valid votes		32,242	100.0	
Total rejected, unmarked and declined ballots		433	1.33	
Turnout		32,675	46.34	
Eligible voters		70,518		
Liberal gain from New Democratic		Swing		+1.64
Source(s) Elections Ontario (2007). "General Election Poll By Poll Results: 106 York South-Weston" (PDF).

=== Ontario general election, 2011 ===
On Feb. 8, 2011—on the fourth anniversary of his by-election victory—Ferreira was acclaimed as the Ontario NDP candidate in York South—Weston for the 2011 election. He was once again defeated by Albanese.

2011 Ontario general election: York South—Weston
Party	Candidate	Votes	%	±%
Liberal	Laura Albanese	13,805	44.55	+1.61
New Democratic	Paul Ferreira	13,071	42.18	+0.64
Progressive Conservative	Lan Daniel	3,441	11.10	+1.26
Green	Keith Jarrett	474	1.53	-2.27
Freedom	Eric Compton	151	0.49	
Independent	Michael Radejewski	45	0.15	
Total valid votes		30,987	100.00	
Total rejected, unmarked and declined ballots		227	0.73	
Turnout		31,214	44.86	
Eligible voters		69,580		
Liberal hold		Swing		+0.49
Source(s) "Official return from the records / Rapport des registres officiel - York South—Weston" (PDF). Elections Ontario. 2011.
