= Stormont—Dundas—South Glengarry (provincial electoral district) =

Provincial electoral district in Ontario, Canada

Coordinates: 45.17°N 74.95°W

Ontario electoral district
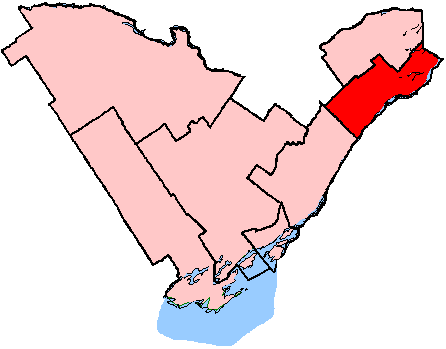
- Stormont—Dundas—South Glengarry in relation to other eastern Ontario electoral districts

Provincial electoral district
- Legislature: Legislative Assembly of Ontario
MPP
Nolan Quinn
Progressive Conservative
- District created: 2004
- First contested: 2007
- Last contested: 2025

Demographics
- Population (2016): 103,320
- Electors (2018): 81,342
- Area (km²): 2,812
- Pop. density (per km²): 36.7
- Census division: Stormont, Dundas and Glengarry United Counties
- Census subdivision(s): Cornwall, South Glengarry, South Stormont, North Dundas, South Dundas, North Stormont

Stormont—Dundas—South Glengarry is a provincial electoral district in Eastern Ontario, Canada. It was created for the 2007 provincial election. 95.5% came from Stormont—Dundas—Charlottenburgh while 4.5% came from Glengarry—Prescott—Russell.

The electoral district includes the City of Cornwall, with approximately 40% of the district's population, the Mohawk Nation at Akwesasne and all of the united counties of Stormont, Dundas and Glengarry except for the township of North Glengarry.

== Members of Provincial Parliament ==
Stormont—Dundas—South Glengarry
| Assembly | Years | Member | Party |
|---|---|---|---|
Stormont—Dundas—Charlottenburgh
Riding created from Cornwall and Stormont—Dundas—Glengarry and East Grenville
| 37th | 1999–2003 | John Cleary | Liberal |
| 38th | 2003–2007 | Jim Brownell | Liberal |
Stormont—Dundas—South Glengarry
| 39th | 2007–2011 | Jim Brownell | Liberal |
| 40th | 2011–2014 | Jim McDonell | Progressive Conservative |
| 41st | 2014–2018 | Jim McDonell | Progressive Conservative |
| 42nd | 2018–2022 | Jim McDonell | Progressive Conservative |
| 43rd | 2022–present | Nolan Quinn | Progressive Conservative |

== Election results ==
Winning party in each polling division of Stormont—Dundas—South Glengarry at the 2025 Ontario general election

2025 Ontario general election
| Party | Candidate | Votes | % | ±% |
|---|---|---|---|---|
| Progressive Conservative | Nolan Quinn | 23,221 | 61.57 | +4.07 |
| Liberal | Devon Monkhouse | 7,254 | 19.23 | +1.35 |
| New Democratic | Jeremy Rose | 4,726 | 12.53 | –1.26 |
| Green | Nicholas Lapierre | 980 | 2.60 | –1.49 |
| New Blue | Stefan Kohut | 818 | 2.17 | –2.09 |
| Ontario Party | Brigitte Sugrue | 715 | 1.90 | –0.58 |
| Total valid votes | | 37,714 | 99.24 | |
| Total rejected, unmarked and declined ballots | | 290 | 0.76 | +0.17 |
| Turnout | | 38,004 | 42.98 | +1.34 |
| Eligible voters | | 88,432 | | |
| Progressive Conservative hold | | Swing | | +1.36 |
Source: Elections Ontario

Winning party in each polling division of Stormont—Dundas—South Glengarry at the 2022 Ontario general election

2022 Ontario general election
| Party | Candidate | Votes | % | ±% | Expenditures |
|---|---|---|---|---|---|
| Progressive Conservative | Nolan Quinn | 20,766 | 57.50 | –4.01 | $84,981 |
| Liberal | Kirsten J. Gardner | 6,458 | 17.88 | +5.51 | $24,320 |
| New Democratic | Wendy Stephen | 4,982 | 13.80 | –7.83 | $16,486 |
| New Blue | Claude Tardif | 1,538 | 4.26 | – | $8,380 |
| Green | Jacqueline Milner | 1,477 | 4.09 | +0.42 | $6,901 |
| Ontario Party | Remi Tremblay | 893 | 2.47 | – | $6,290 |
| Total valid votes/expense limit | | 36,114 | 99.41 | – | $122,485 |
| Total rejected, unmarked and declined ballots | | 214 | 0.59 | –0.48 | |
| Turnout | | 36,328 | 41.63 | –12.47 | |
| Eligible voters | | 87,263 | | | |
| Progressive Conservative hold | | Swing | | –4.76 | |
Source: Elections Ontario

2018 Ontario general election
| Party | Candidate | Votes | % | ±% |
|---|---|---|---|---|
| Progressive Conservative | Jim McDonell | 26,780 | 61.51 | +9.79 |
| New Democratic | Marc Benoit | 9,416 | 21.63 | +0.72 |
| Liberal | Heather Megill | 5,386 | 12.37 | –10.82 |
| Green | Elaine Kennedy | 1,596 | 3.67 | +0.99 |
| Libertarian | Sabile Trimm | 360 | 0.83 | –0.68 |
| Total valid votes | | 43,538 | 98.93 | |
| Total rejected, unmarked and declined ballots | | 471 | 1.07 | –0.08 |
| Turnout | | 44,009 | 54.10 | +2.08 |
| Eligible voters | | 81,342 | | |
| Progressive Conservative hold | | Swing | | +4.53 |
Source: Elections Ontario

2014 Ontario general election
| Party | Candidate | Votes | % | ±% |
|---|---|---|---|---|
| Progressive Conservative | Jim McDonell | 20,624 | 51.72 | –3.54 |
| Liberal | John Earle | 9,250 | 23.20 | +1.54 |
| New Democratic | Elaine MacDonald | 8,336 | 20.90 | +0.25 |
| Green | Sharron Norman | 1,067 | 2.68 | +1.26 |
| Libertarian | Shawn McRae | 602 | 1.51 | +0.49 |
| Total valid votes | | 39,879 | 98.85 | |
| Total rejected, unmarked and declined ballots | | 463 | 1.15 | +0.62 |
| Turnout | | 40,342 | 52.02 | +0.63 |
| Eligible voters | | 77,544 | | |
| Progressive Conservative hold | | Swing | | –2.54 |
Source: Elections Ontario

2011 Ontario general election
| Party | Candidate | Votes | % | ±% |
|---|---|---|---|---|
| Progressive Conservative | Jim McDonell | 21,463 | 55.25 | +16.52 |
| Liberal | Mark A. Macdonald | 8,413 | 21.66 | –27.20 |
| New Democratic | Elaine MacDonald | 8,021 | 20.65 | +13.28 |
| Green | Justin Reist | 551 | 1.42 | –2.98 |
| Libertarian | Darcy Neal Donnelly | 396 | 1.02 | – |
| Total valid votes | | 38,844 | 99.48 | |
| Total rejected, unmarked and declined ballots | | 205 | 0.53 | –0.11 |
| Turnout | | 39,049 | 51.40 | –0.41 |
| Eligible voters | | 75,975 | | |
| Progressive Conservative gain from Liberal | | Swing | | +21.86 |
Source: Elections Ontario

2007 Ontario general election
| Party | Candidate | Votes | % | ±% |
|---|---|---|---|---|
| Liberal | Jim Brownell | 18,660 | 48.86 | –2.33 |
| Progressive Conservative | Chris Savard | 14,794 | 38.73 | +2.23 |
| New Democratic | Lori Taylor | 2,813 | 7.37 | +3.08 |
| Green | Elaine Kennedy | 1,680 | 4.40 | –1.09 |
| Family Coalition | Lukas Bebjak | 247 | 0.65 | – |
| Total valid votes | | 38,194 | 99.37 | |
| Total rejected, unmarked and declined ballots | | 244 | 0.63 | –0.23 |
| Turnout | | 38,438 | 51.81 | –3.97 |
| Eligible voters | | 74,190 | | |
| Liberal hold | | Swing | | –2.28 |
Source: Elections Ontario

=== Stormont—Dundas—Charlottenburgh ===
2003 Ontario general election: Stormont—Dundas—Charlottenburgh
| Party | Candidate | Votes | % | ±% |
|---|---|---|---|---|
| Liberal | Jim Brownell | 19,558 | 51.18 | +3.20 |
| Progressive Conservative | Todd Lalonde | 13,948 | 36.50 | –9.97 |
| Green | Tom Manley | 2,098 | 5.49 | – |
| New Democratic | Matt Z. Sumegi | 1,639 | 4.29 | –0.47 |
| Independent | Gary Besner | 968 | 2.53 | – |
| Total valid votes | | 38,211 | 99.14 | |
| Total rejected, unmarked and declined ballots | | 333 | 0.86 | +0.40 |
| Turnout | | 38,544 | 55.78 | –5.58 |
| Eligible voters | | 69,101 | | |
| Liberal hold | | Swing | | +6.58 |
Source: Elections Ontario

1999 Ontario general election: Stormont—Dundas—Charlottenburgh
| Party | Candidate | Votes | % |
|---|---|---|---|
| Liberal | John Cleary | 20,275 | 47.99 |
| Progressive Conservative | Noble Villeneuve | 19,635 | 46.47 |
| New Democratic | Maggie MacDonald | 2,012 | 4.76 |
| Natural Law | Ian Campbell | 329 | 0.78 |
| Total valid votes | | 42,251 | 99.54 |
| Total rejected, unmarked and declined ballots | | 195 | 0.46 |
| Turnout | | 42,446 | 61.36 |
| Eligible voters | | 69,171 | |
| Liberal pickup new district. | | | |
Source: Elections Ontario

== 2007 electoral reform referendum ==
2007 Ontario electoral reform referendum
| Side | Votes | % |
|---|---|---|
| First Past the Post | 27,491 | 73.2 |
| Mixed member proportional | 10,063 | 26.8 |
| Total valid votes | 37,554 | 100.0 |

== See also ==
- List of Ontario provincial electoral districts
- Canadian provincial electoral districts
