= Joseph Cordiano =

Canadian politician and businessman (born 1957)

The Honourable Joseph Cordiano ECO
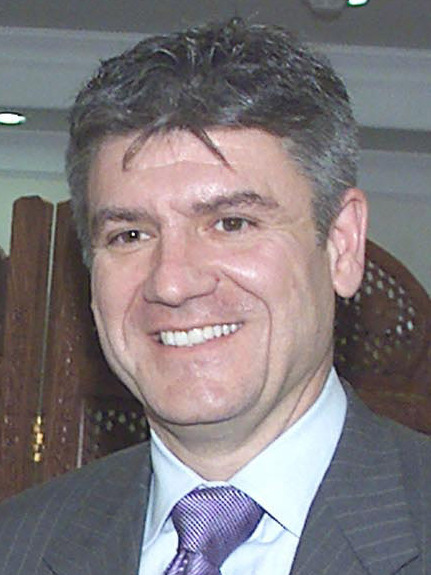

Ontario MPP
- In office 1999–2006
- Preceded by: New riding
- Succeeded by: Paul Ferreira
- Constituency: York South—Weston
- In office 1987–1999
- Preceded by: New riding
- Succeeded by: Riding abolished
- Constituency: Lawrence
- In office 1985–1987
- Preceded by: Odoardo Di Santo
- Succeeded by: Laureano Leone
- Constituency: Downsview

Personal details
- Born: October 30, 1957 (age 68) Toronto, Ontario
- Party: Liberal
- Occupation: Business owner

Joseph Cordiano (born October 30, 1957) is a former politician in Ontario, Canada. He was a Liberal member of the Legislative Assembly of Ontario from 1985 to 2006, representing a succession of ridings in northwestern Toronto. He served as a cabinet minister in the government of Dalton McGuinty.

== Background ==
Cordiano was born in Toronto, Ontario, the son of Italian immigrants. He was educated at the University of Toronto and the University of Toledo in Ohio, graduating from the latter with a Master's Degree in Business Administration. He was the owner and General Manager of Cash Rolls of Canada.

== Politics ==
Cordiano was elected to the Ontario legislature in the provincial election of 1985, defeating incumbent New Democrat Odoardo Di Santo by 221 votes in the Toronto riding of Downsview. He was re-elected by a greater margin in the redistributed riding of Lawrence in the provincial election of 1987. He served as Parliamentary Assistant to several ministers.

The Liberals were upset by the NDP in the provincial election of 1990 and Cordiano faced a difficult challenge from NDP candidate Shalom Schachter, winning by 11,786 votes to 10,179. He subsequently emerged as a prominent voice for the provincial Liberal Party within Toronto. The provincial election of 1995 saw Cordiano win his riding by a comfortable margin — the provincial swing was to the Progressive Conservative Party, but the PCs did not have enough support in Lawrence to seriously compete for the riding.

When Lyn McLeod resigned as Liberal leader in 1996, Cordiano announced his candidacy to succeed her. At first, many saw him as the leading challenger to frontrunner Gerard Kennedy, who was regarded as representing the left wing of the party. Cordiano, in turn, was seen by many as representing the party's establishment, while holding some right-wing leanings.

The leadership convention was held in November 1996. Cordiano finished second to Kennedy on the first ballot, but was unable to build upon his position in later counts. Dalton McGuinty tied him for second place on the third ballot, and overtook him on the fourth. Cordiano supported McGuinty on the fifth ballot, and was thereby largely responsible for McGuinty's victory over Kennedy for the party's leadership. Cordiano was subsequently named as Deputy Leader of the Opposition, and held this position until 1998. His replacement by Gerry Phillips as Deputy Leader angered some in the province's Italian community.

Cordiano and Kennedy were again rivals in the provincial election of 1999, this time for the Liberal nomination in the redistributed riding of York South—Weston. Kennedy was convinced by the party leadership to run elsewhere, and Cordiano won an easy victory in the election which followed. The Progressive Conservatives were re-elected in the general election, however, and Cordiano remained on the opposition benches. In 2000, he was appointed opposition critic for financial institutions.

The Liberals won the provincial election of 2003, and Cordiano won another easy victory in York South—Weston. On October 23, 2003, Cordiano was named Minister for Economic Development and Trade.

Cordiano was the architect behind the Ontario Automotive Investment Strategy that saw the province leverage over $7 billion in new automotive investment into the province. Under his term as Minister, Ontario replaced Michigan as the largest auto-producing jurisdiction in North America. He was also responsible for the securing a new Toyota assembly plant in Woodstock, Ontario. This was Ontario's first new assembly plant in over 20 years. Jurisdictions across the United States were in competition for this highly sought after investment that created 1,300 direct jobs and thousands more in related sectors.

Cordiano resigned from the cabinet and the legislature on September 18, 2006, citing a desire to spend more time with his family.

=== Cabinet posts ===
McGuinty ministry, Province of Ontario (2003–2013)
Cabinet post (1)
Predecessor	Office	Successor
Bob Runciman	Minister for Economic Development and Trade; 2003–2006	Sandra Pupatello

=== Electoral record ===
2003 Ontario general election: York South—Weston
Party	Candidate	Votes	%	±%
Liberal	Joseph Cordiano	19,932	61.56	+8.17
New Democratic	Brian Donlevy	6,247	19.29	-0.80
Progressive Conservative	Stephen Halicki	4,930	15.23	-6.68
Green	Enrique Palad	794	2.45	+2.02
Family Coalition	Mariangela Sanabria	475	1.47	-0.12
Total valid votes		32,378	100.0	
Total rejected, unmarked and declined ballots		540	1.56	
Turnout		32,747	50.70	
Eligible voters		64,589		
Liberal hold		Swing		+4.48
Source(s) Elections Ontario (2003). "General Election of October 2, 2003 Poll By Poll Results: 102 York South-Weston".

1999 Ontario general election: York South—Weston
Party	Candidate	Votes	%
Liberal	Joseph Cordiano	18,205	53.39
Progressive Conservative	Alan Hofmeister	7,471	21.91
New Democratic	Rosana Pellizzari	6,850	20.09
Family Coalition	Enzo Granzotto	542	1.59
Independent	David Gershuny	486	1.43
Communist	Hassan Husseini	261	0.77
Green	Alma Subasic	147	0.43
Natural Law	Erica Kindl	139	0.41
Total valid votes		34,101	100.0
Total rejected, unmarked and declined ballots		540	1.56
Turnout		34,641	58.23
Eligible voters		59,490	
Source(s) Elections Ontario (1999). "General Election of June 3 1999 Poll By Poll Results: 102 York South-Weston".

== Later life ==
After leaving politics, Cordiano became President of Dominus Construction Group and Principal of Cityzen Development Group. He has remained engaged in public life as a board member of West Park Healthcentre. He currently sits as an advisory board member of the Mowat Centre at the University of Toronto. Cordiano is also a member of the Board of Advisors of MobileBits.
