= Results of the 2003 Ontario general election by riding =

Candidates of the 2003 Ontario general election
- October 2, 2003

The following riding results occurred during the 2003 Ontario general election held on October 2, 2003.

== Ottawa ==
Electoral district	Candidates					Incumbent
Electoral district	Liberal	PC	NDP	Green	Other	Incumbent
Nepean—Carleton	Rod Vanier; 20,878 (35.65%)	John Baird; 31,662 (54.06%)	Liam McCarthy; 3,828 (6.54%)	Matt Takach; 2,200 (3.76%)		John Baird
Ottawa Centre	Richard Patten; 22,295 (45.1%)	Joe Varner; 11,217 (22.69%)	Jeff Atkinson; 11,362 (22.98%)	Chris Bradshaw; 3,821 (7.73%)	Stuart Ryan (Comm); 306 (0.62%); Matt Szymanowicz (F); 218 (0.44%); Fakhry Guirguis (Ind); 214 (0.43%)	Richard Patten
Ottawa—Orléans	Phil McNeely; 25,300 (50.36%)	Brian Coburn; 20,762 (41.32%)	Ric Dagenais; 2,778 (5.53%)	Melanie Ransom; 1,402 (2.79%)		Brian Coburn
Ottawa South	Dalton McGuinty; 24,647 (51.7%)	Richard Raymond; 16,413 (34.43%)	James McLaren; 4,306 (9.03%)	David Chernushenko; 1,741 (3.65%)	John Pacheco (FCP); 562 (1.18%)	Dalton McGuinty
Ottawa—Vanier	Madeleine Meilleur; 22,188 (53.53%)	Maurice Lamirande; 10,878 (26.24%)	Joseph Zebrowski; 6,507 (15.7%)	Raphael Thierrin; 1,876 (4.53%)		Claudette Boyer †
Ottawa West—Nepean	Jim Watson; 23,127 (47.04%)	Garry Guzzo; 20,277 (41.24%)	Marlene Rivier; 4,099 (8.34%)	Neil Adair; 1,309 (2.66%)	Robert Gauthier (Ind); 353 (0.72%)	Garry Guzzo

== Eastern Ontario ==
Electoral district	Candidates					Incumbent
Electoral district	Liberal	PC	NDP	Green	Other	Incumbent
Glengarry—Prescott—Russell	Jean-Marc Lalonde; 28,956	Albert Bourdeau; 10,921	Guy Belle-Isle; 2,544	Louise Pattington; 1,471		Jean-Marc Lalonde
Hastings—Frontenac—Lennox and Addington	Leona Dombrowsky; 21,548	Barry Gordon; 13,709	Ross Sutherland; 4,286	Adam Scott; 1,311	John-Henry Westen (FCP); 673	Leona Dombrowsky
Kingston and the Islands	John Gerretsen; 28,877	Hans Westenberg; 9,640	Janet Collins; 5,514	Eric Walton; 3,137	Chris Beneteau (FCP); 735	John Gerretsen
Lanark—Carleton	Marianne Wilkinson; 23,466 (38.79%)	Norm Sterling; 29,641 (48.99%)	Jim Ronson; 3,554 (5.87%)	John Baranyi; 2,564 (4.24%)	Jim Gardiner (FCP); 1,275 (2.11%)	Norm Sterling
Leeds—Grenville	Stephen Mazurek; 17,667	Bob Runciman; 21,443	Steve Armstrong; 2,469	Jerry Heath; 1,799	Melody Trolly (FCP); 649	Bob Runciman
Prince Edward—Hastings	Ernie Parsons; 22,937	John Williams; 12,800	Jodie Jenkins; 3,377	Joe Ross; 628	Trueman Tuck (F); 229	Ernie Parsons
Renfrew—Nipissing—Pembroke	Derek Nighbor; 18,629	John Yakabuski; 19,274	Felcite Stairs; 5,092	Chris Walker; 671		Sean Conway †
Stormont—Dundas— Charlottenburgh	Jim Brownell; 19,558	Todd Lalonde; 13,948	Matt Sumegi; 1,639	Tom Manley; 2,098	Gary Besner (Ind); 968	John Cleary †

== Central Ontario ==
Electoral district	Candidates					Incumbent
Electoral district	Liberal	PC	NDP	Green	Other	Incumbent
Barrie—Simcoe—Bradford	Mike Ramsay; 21,998	Joe Tascona; 31,529	John Thomson; 5,641	Stewart Sinclair; 1,278	Roberto Sales (FCP); 441	Joe Tascona
Bruce—Grey—Owen Sound	Dave Hocking; 14,881	Bill Murdoch; 23,338	Colleen Purdon; 4,159	Martin Donald; 769	Linda Freiburger (FCP); 1,086; Bill Cook (Ref); 586	Bill Murdoch
Dufferin—Peel—Wellington—Grey	Dan Yake; 14,859	Ernie Eves; 29,222	Mitchel Healey; 3,148	Frank de Jong; 3,161	Dave Davies (FCP); 1,202	Ernie Eves
Durham	Garry Minnie; 18,590	John O'Toole; 23,814	Teresa Williams; 6,274	Gordon MacDonald; 1,183	Cathy McKeever (F); 707	John O'Toole
Haliburton—Victoria—Brock	Jason Ward; 17,171	Laurie Scott; 24,297	Earl Manners; 7,884	Douglas Smith; 1,183	Paul Gordon (FCP); 663; Charles Olito (F); 273	Chris Hodgson †
Northumberland	Lou Rinaldi; 20,382	Doug Galt; 17,816	Murray Weppler; 5,210	Derrick Kelly; 1,839		Doug Galt
Peterborough	Jeff Leal; 24,626	Gary Stewart; 18,418	Dave Nickle; 9,796	Tim Holland; 1,605	Max Murray (FCP); 414; Bob Bowers (Ind); 178	Gary Stewart
Simcoe—Grey	Mark Redmond; 17,505	Jim Wilson; 26,114	Leo Losereit; 5,032	Geoffrey Maile; 875	Steven Taylor (FCP); 801; Philip Bender (Lbt); 411	Jim Wilson
Simcoe North	Paul Sloan; 19,713	Garfield Dunlop; 23,393	John Niddery; 5,515	Nina Pruesse; 1,540	Blaine Scott (FCP); 453; Karnail Singh (Ind); 101	Garfield Dunlop
York North	John Taylor; 21,054	Julia Munro; 24,517	Sylvia Gerl; 4,029	Bob Burrows; 1,854	Simone Williams (FCP); 497	Julia Munro

== Southern Durham & York ==
Electoral district	Candidates					Incumbent
Electoral district	Liberal	PC	NDP	Green	Other	Incumbent
Markham	Tony Wong; 27,253	David Tsubouchi; 21,257	Janice Hagan; 2,679	Bernadette Manning; 824	Patrick Redmond (FCP); 697	David Tsubouchi
Oak Ridges	Helena Jaczek; 31,026	Frank Klees; 32,647	Pamela Courtot; 4,464	Steven Haylestrom; 1,821		Frank Klees
Oshawa	Chris Topple; 9,383	Jerry Ouellette; 14,566	Sid Ryan; 13,547	Karen Tweedle; 636	Paul McKeever (F); 518; Dale Chilvers (FCP); 383	Jerry Ouellette
Pickering—Ajax—Uxbridge	Wayne Arthurs; 24,970	Janet Ecker; 23,960	Vern Edwards; 3,690	Adam Duncan; 1,946		Janet Ecker
Thornhill	Mario Racco; 21,419	Tina Molinari; 20,623	Laurie Orrett; 2,616	Bridget Haworth; 705	Lindsay King (F); 304	Tina Molinari
Vaughan—King—Aurora	Greg Sorbara; 36,928	Carmine Iacono; 21,744	Mike Seaward; 4,697	Adrian Visentin; 2,412		Greg Sorbara
Whitby—Ajax	Dennis Fox; 22,593	Jim Flaherty; 27,240	Dan Edwards; 5,155	Michael MacDonald; 1,375		Jim Flaherty

== Downtown Toronto ==
Electoral district	Candidates					Incumbent
Electoral district	Liberal	PC	NDP	Green	Other	Incumbent
Beaches—East York	Monica Purdy; 10,070	Angela Kennedy; 8,157	Michael Prue; 21,239	Tom Mason; 1,995		Michael Prue
Davenport	Tony Ruprecht; 15,586	Tom Smith; 1,977	Jordan Berger; 7,243	Mark O'Brien; 907	David Senater (Ind); 293; Franz Cauchi (F); 264; Nunzio Venuto (Lbt); 233	Tony Ruprecht
Don Valley West	Kathleen Wynne; 23,488	David Turnbull; 17,394	Ali Naqvi; 2,540	Philip Hawkins; 1,239		David Turnbull
Eglinton—Lawrence	Mike Colle; 23,743	Corinne Korzen; 12,402	Robin Alter; 4,351	Mark Viitala; 1,236		Mike Colle
Parkdale—High Park	Gerard Kennedy; 23,008	Stephen Snell; 6,436	Margo Duncan; 6,275	Neil Spiegel; 2,758	Stan Grzywna (FCP); 591; Karin Larsen (Comm); 349; John Steele (Comm League); 204; Richard (Dick) Field (F); 165	Gerard Kennedy
St. Paul's	Michael Bryant; 24,887	Charis Kelso; 11,203	Julian Heller; 6,740	Peter Elgie; 2,266	Carol Leborg (F); 354	Michael Bryant
Toronto Centre—Rosedale	George Smitherman; 23,872	John Adams; 9,968	Gene Lara; 9,112	Gabriel Draven; 1,739	Philip Fernandez (Ind Renewal); 324; Silvio Ursomarzo (F); 218	George Smitherman
Toronto—Danforth	Jim Davidson; 12,246	George Sardelis; 6,562	Marilyn Churley; 18,253	Michael Pilling; 1,368	Masood Atchekzai (FCP); 217; Mehmet Ali Yagiz (Ind); 73	Marilyn Churley
Trinity—Spadina	Nellie Pedro; 12,927	Helena Guergis; 4,985	Rosario Marchese; 19,268	Greg Laxton; 2,362	Judson Glober (Lbt); 756; Nick Lin (Ind Renewal); 256	Rosario Marchese
York South—Weston	Joseph Cordiano; 19,932	Stephen Halicki; 4,930	Brian Donlevy; 6,247	Enrique Palad; 794	Mariangela Sanabria (FCP); 475	Joseph Cordiano

== Suburban Toronto ==
Electoral district	Candidates					Incumbent
Electoral district	Liberal	PC	NDP	Green	Other	Incumbent
Don Valley East	David Caplan; 21,327	Paul Sutherland; 12,027	Murphy Browne; 3,058	Dan Craig; 558	Ryan Kidd (FCP); 460; Wayne Simmons (F); 119	David Caplan
Etobicoke Centre	Donna Cansfield; 22,070	Rose Andrachuk; 17,610	Margaret Anne McHugh; 3,400	Ralph M. Chapman; 1,584		Chris Stockwell †
Etobicoke—Lakeshore	Laurel Broten; 19,680	Morley Kells; 14,524	Irene Jones; 8,952	Junyee Wang; 708	Ted Kupiec (FCP); 480; Janice Murray (Ind Renewal); 225	Morley Kells
Etobicoke North	Shafiq Qaadri; 16,727	Baljit Gosal; 6,978	Kuldip Singh Sodhi; 3,516	Mir Kamal; 503	Frank Acri (Ind); 1,990; Teresa Ceolin (FCP); 1,275	John Hastings †
Scarborough—Agincourt	Gerry Phillips; 23,026	Yolanda Chan; 11,337	Stacy Douglas; 2,209	Lawrence Arkilander; 566	Tony Ieraci (FCP); 550	Gerry Phillips
Scarborough Centre	Brad Duguid; 21,698	Marilyn Mushinski; 11,686	Michael Laxer; 3,653	Robert Carty; 642	Costas Manios (Independent Liberal); 3,259; Joseph Internicola (FCP); 495; Elizabeth Rowley (Comm); 241	Marilyn Mushinski
Scarborough East	Mary Anne Chambers; 21,798	Steve Gilchrist; 14,323	Gary Dale; 5,250	Hugh McNeil; 668	Sam Apelbaum (Lbt); 285	Steve Gilchrist
Scarborough—Rouge River	Alvin Curling; 23,976	Kevin Moore; 9,468	Jean-Paul Yovanoff; 2,246	Karen Macdonald; 1,326	Mitchell Persaud (FCP); 536	Alvin Curling
Scarborough Southwest	Lorenzo Berardinetti; 17,501	Dan Newman; 11,826	Barbara Warner; 6,688	Andrew Strachan; 689	Ray Scott (FCP); 586	Dan Newman
Willowdale	David Zimmer; 21,823	David Young; 19,957	Yvonne Bobb; 3,084	Sharolyn Vettesse; 933	Rina Morra (FCP); 442; Vaughan Byrnes (F); 227	David Young
York Centre	Monte Kwinter; 18,808	Dan Cullen; 7,826	Matthew Norrish; 3,494	Constantine Kritsonis; 1,496		Monte Kwinter
York West	Mario Sergio; 16,102	Ted Aver; 2,330	Garth Bobb; 3,954	Richard Von Fuchs; 437	Christopher Black (Comm); 408	Mario Sergio

== Brampton, Mississauga & Oakville ==
Electoral district	Candidates					Incumbent
Electoral district	Liberal	PC	NDP	Green	Other	Incumbent
Bramalea—Gore—Malton—Springdale	Kuldip Kular; 19,306	Raminder Gill; 15,549	Cesar Martello; 4,931	Ernst Braendli; 1,176	Frank Chilelli (Ind Renewal); 868; Howard Cukoff (Comm); 503	Raminder Gill
Brampton Centre	Linda Jeffrey; 16,661	Joe Spina; 15,656	Kathy Pounder; 4,827	Sanjeev Goel; 820	Wally Dove (F); 356	Joe Spina
Brampton West—Mississauga	Vic Dhillon; 28,926	Tony Clement; 26,414	Chris Moise; 5,103	Paul Simas; 811	Paul Micelli (FCP); 1,122; John G. Purdy (F); 266	Tony Clement
Mississauga Centre	Harinder Takhar; 18,466	Rob Sampson; 15,846	Michael Miller; 3,237	Jeffrey Scott Smith; 776	John R. Lyall (FCP); 588	Rob Sampson
Mississauga East	Peter Fonseca; 16,686	Carl DeFaria; 13,382	Michael Hancock; 2,479	Donald Barber; 666	Gary Nail (FCP); 358; Pierre Chenier (Ind Renewal); 256	Carl DeFaria
Mississauga South	Tim Peterson; 17,211	Margaret Marland; 16,977	Ken Cole; 3,606	Pamela Murray; 949	Alfred Zawadzki (FCP); 555	Margaret Marland
Mississauga West	Bob Delaney; 27,903	Nina Tangri; 20,406	Arif Raza; 4,196	Richard Pereira; 1,395	Charles Montano (FCP); 989	John Snobelen †
Oakville	Kevin Flynn; 22,428	Kurt Franklin; 18,991	Anwar Naqvi; 2,858		Theresa Tritt (FCP); 751	Gary Carr †

== Hamilton, Burlington & Niagara ==
Electoral district	Candidates					Incumbent
Electoral district	Liberal	PC	NDP	Green	Other	Incumbent
Ancaster—Dundas— Flamborough—Aldershot	Ted McMeekin; 23,045	Mark Mullins; 18,141	Kelly Hayes; 5,666	Brian Elder Sullivan; 903	Michael Trolly (FCP); 434; Richard Butson (CoR); 293	Ted McMeekin
Burlington	Mark Fuller; 19,654	Cam Jackson; 21,506	David Laird; 3,832	Julie Gordon; 1,086	Vic Corvaro (FCP); 523	Cam Jackson
Erie—Lincoln	Vance Badawey; 16,290	Tim Hudak; 20,348	Julius Antal; 3,950	Tom Ferguson; 713	Steve Elgersma (FCP); 666	Tim Hudak
Halton	Barbara Sullivan; 28,112	Ted Chudleigh; 33,610	Jay Jackson; 5,587	Matthew Raymond Smith; 1,295	Giuseppe Gori (FCP); 1,123	Ted Chudleigh
Hamilton East	Dominic Agostino; 16,015	Sohail Bhatti; 4,033	Bob Sutton; 9,035	Raymond Dartsch; 563	Bob Mann (Comm); 380; Kelly Greenaway (Ind Renewal); 378; Michael Izzotti (FCP); 304	Dominic Agostino
Hamilton Mountain	Marie Bountrogianni; 23,524	Shakil Hassan; 8,637	Chris Charlton; 12,017	Selwyn Inniss; 494	Eleanor Johnson (FCP); 748	Marie Bountrogianni
Hamilton West	Judy Marsales; 15,600	Doug Brown; 8,185	Roy Adams; 13,468	Jo Pavlov; 727	Lynne Scime (FCP); 750; Jamilé Ghaddar (Ind Renewal); 303	David Christopherson †
Niagara Centre	Henry D'Angela; 12,526	Ann Gronski; 10,336	Peter Kormos; 23,289	Jordan McArthur; 768		Peter Kormos
Niagara Falls	Kim Craitor; 18,904	Bart Maves; 15,353	Claude Sonier; 4,962	Ryan McLaughlin; 1,124		Bart Maves
St. Catharines	Jim Bradley; 25,319	Mark Brickell; 12,932	John Bacher; 3,944	Jim Fannon; 1,167	Linda Klassen (FCP); 714	Jim Bradley
Stoney Creek	Jennifer Mossop; 24,751	Brad Clark; 19,517	Lorrie McKibbon; 5,419	Richard Safka; 898		Brad Clark

== Midwestern Ontario ==
Electoral district	Candidates					Incumbent
Electoral district	Liberal	PC	NDP	Green	Other	Incumbent
Brant	Dave Levac; 24,236	Alayne Sokoloski; 13,618	David Noonan; 5,262	Mike Clancy; 1,014	John Turmel (Ind); 295	Dave Levac
Cambridge	Jerry Boyle; 16,559	Gerry Martiniuk; 19,996	Pam Wolf; 8,513	Michael Chownyk; 983	Al Smith (FCP); 1,001	Gerry Martiniuk
Guelph—Wellington	Liz Sandals; 23,607	Brenda Elliott; 20,735	James Valcke; 6,745	Ben Polley; 3,917	Alan John McDonald (FCP); 914	Brenda Elliott
Haldimand—Norfolk—Brant	Rob Esselment; 17,151	Toby Barrett; 20,109	Paul Steiner; 4,720	Graeme Dunn; 1,088	Barra Gots (FCP); 548	Toby Barrett
Huron—Bruce	Carol Mitchell; 19,879	Helen Johns; 16,594	Grant Robertson; 4,973	Shelley Hannah; 934	Dave Joslin (FCP); 902; Robert Sabharwal (F); 127	Helen Johns
Kitchener Centre	John Milloy; 18,280	Wayne Wettlaufer; 16,210	Ted Martin; 6,781	Luigi D'Agnillo; 1,728		Wayne Wettlaufer
Kitchener—Waterloo	Sean Strickland; 22,456	Elizabeth Witmer; 23,957	Dan Lajoie; 6,084	Pauline Richards; 1,774	Lou Reitzel (FCP); 949; Owen Alastair Ferguson (Ind); 242; Julian Ichim (Ind Renewal); 153	Elizabeth Witmer
Oxford	Brian Brown; 16,135	Ernie Hardeman; 18,656	Shawn Rouse; 5,318	Tom Mayberry; 838	Andre De Decker (FCP); 689; Paul Blair (F); 404; Kaye Sargent (Lbt); 306	Ernie Hardeman
Perth—Middlesex	John Wilkinson; 17,017	Bert Johnson; 15,680	Jack Verhulst; 4,703	John Cowling; 1,201	Pat Bannon (FCP); 857; Robert Smink (F); 384	Bert Johnson
Waterloo—Wellington	Deborah Whale; 17,344	Ted Arnott; 22,550	Richard Walsh Bowers; 3,970	Allan Strong; 1,203	Gord Truscott (FCP); 978	Ted Arnott

== Southwestern Ontario ==
Electoral district	Candidates					Incumbent
Electoral district	Liberal	PC	NDP	Green	Other	Incumbent
Chatham-Kent—Essex	Pat Hoy; 23,022	Dave Wilkinson; 11,586	Derry McKeever; 2,893	Jim Burgess; 1,069	David Rodman (F); 281	Pat Hoy
Elgin—Middlesex—London	Steve Peters; 24,914	Bruce Smith; 13,149	Bryan Bakker; 4,063	Mark Viitala; 1,236	Ray Monteith (F); 671	Steve Peters
Essex	Bruce Crozier; 20,559	Patrick O'Neil; 11,234	Pat Hayes; 12,614	Darren J. Brown; 998		Bruce Crozier
Lambton—Kent—Middlesex	Maria Van Bommel; 18,533	Marcel Beaubien; 15,060	Joyce Jolliffe; 4,523	Tim Van Bodegom; 1,133	James Armstrong (Ind); 1,053; Wayne Forbes (F); 780	Marcel Beaubien
London North Centre	Deb Matthews; 20,212	Dianne Cunningham; 13,460	Rebecca Coulter; 11,414	Bronagh Joyce Morgan; 780	Craig Smith (FCP); 432; Lisa Turner (F); 242	Dianne Cunningham
London—Fanshawe	Khalil Ramal; 13,920	Frank Mazzilli; 11,777	Irene Mathyssen; 12,051	Bryan Smith; 568	Mike Davidson (F); 493	Frank Mazzilli
London West	Chris Bentley; 25,581	Bob Wood; 15,463	Patti Dalton; 7,403	Laura Wythe; 805	Bill Frampton (F); 460	Bob Wood
Sarnia—Lambton	Caroline Di Cocco; 18,179	Henk Vanden Ende; 11,852	Glenn Sonier; 6,482	Bradley Gray; 1,414	Andrew Falby (F); 316	Caroline Di Cocco
Windsor—St. Clair	Dwight Duncan; 19,692	Matt Bufton; 4,162	Madeline Crnec; 10,433	Chris Holt; 1,315	Saroj Bains (Ind Renewal); 253	Dwight Duncan
Windsor West	Sandra Pupatello; 21,993	Derek Insley; 4,187	Yvette Blackburn; 7,383	Cary M. Lucier; 1,233	Enver Villamizar (Ind Renewal); 386	Sandra Pupatello

== Northern Ontario ==
Electoral district	Candidates					Incumbent
Electoral district	Liberal	PC	NDP	Green	Other	Incumbent
Algoma—Manitoulin	Mike Brown; 14,520	Terry McCutcheon; 5,168	Peter Denley; 9,459	Ron Yurick; 680		Mike Brown
Kenora—Rainy River	Geoff McClain; 6,746	Cathe Hoszowski; 3,343	Howard Hampton; 15,666	Dan King; 305		Howard Hampton
Nickel Belt	Alex McCauley; 13,759	Dave Kilgour; 4,804	Shelley Martel; 16,567	Robert Nevin; 479		Shelley Martel
Nipissing	Monique Smith; 18,003	Al McDonald; 14,978	Terry O'Connor; 2,613	Jaimie Board; 528		Al McDonald
Parry Sound—Muskoka	Dan Waters; 13,332	Norm Miller; 18,776	Jo-Anne Boulding; 3,838	Glen Hodgson; 2,277	Charlene Phinney (FCP); 484	Norm Miller
Sault Ste. Marie	David Orazietti; 20,050	Bruce Willson; 2,674	Tony Martin; 11,379	Dan Brosemer; 441	Al Walker (FCP); 606	Tony Martin
Sudbury	Rick Bartolucci; 24,631	Mila Wong; 5,068	Harvey Wyers; 4,999	Luke Norton; 1,009		Rick Bartolucci
Thunder Bay—Atikokan	Bill Mauro; 17,735	Brian McKinnon; 5,365	John Rafferty; 6,582	Kristin Boyer; 762		Lyn McLeod †
Thunder Bay—Superior North	Michael Gravelle; 21,938	Brent Sylvester; 2,912	Bonnie Satten; 4,548	Carl Rose; 882		Michael Gravelle
Timiskaming—Cochrane	David Ramsay; 18,499	Rick Brassard; 6,330	Ben Lefebvre; 5,741	Paul Palmer; 489		David Ramsay
Timmins—James Bay	Michael Doody; 12,373	Merv Russell; 2,527	Gilles Bisson; 14,941	Marsha Kriss; 219		Gilles Bisson

== By-elections ==
Ten by-elections were held between the 2003 and 2007 elections.

Electoral district	Candidates					Incumbent
Electoral district	Liberal	PC	NDP	Green	Other	Incumbent
Hamilton East; May 13, 2004	Ralph Agostino; 6,362	Tara Crugnale; 1,772	Andrea Horwath; 15,185	Raymond Dartsch; 449	John Turmel (Ind); 122	Dominic Agostino died March 24, 2004
Dufferin—Peel—Wellington—Grey; March 17, 2005	Bob Duncanson; 4,621	John Tory; 15,633	Lynda McDougall; 3,891	Frank de Jong; 2,767	Paul Micelli (FCP); 488; Bill Cook (Ind); 164; Philip Bender (Lbt); 135); John Turmel (Ind); 88	Ernie Eves resigned February 1, 2005
Scarborough—Rouge River; November 24, 2005	Bas Balkissoon; 9,347	Cynthia Lai; 4,032	Sheila White; 2,425	Steven Toman; 167	Alan Mercer (Lbt); 100; Rina Morra (FCP); 93; Wayne Simmons (F); 59	Alvin Curling resigned August 19, 2005
Toronto—Danforth; March 30, 2006	Ben Chin; 10,636	Georgina Blanas; 2,713	Peter Tabuns; 13,064	Paul Charbonneau; 582	Franz Cauchi (F); 93	Marilyn Churley
Whitby—Ajax; March 30, 2006	Judi Longfield; 14,529	Christine Elliott; 15,843	Julie Gladman; 3,204	Nick Boileau; 307	Paul McKeever (F); 198	Jim Flaherty
Nepean—Carleton; March 30, 2006	Brian Ford; 9,457	Lisa MacLeod; 17,311	Laurel Gibbons; 2,489	Peter Tretter; 634		John Baird
Parkdale—High Park; September 14, 2006	Sylvia Watson; 9,387	David Hutcheon; 4,921	Cheri DiNovo; 11,675	Frank de Jong; 1,758	Stan Grzywna (FCP); 366; Jim McIntosh (Lbt); 162; Silvio Ursomarzo (F); 111; John Turmel (Ind); 77	Gerard Kennedy
York South—Weston; February 8, 2007	Laura Albanese; 7,830	Pina Martino; 1,941	Paul Ferreira; 8,188	Mir Kamal; 262	Kevin Clarke (Ind); 220; Mohammed Choudhary (Ind); 142; Mariangela Sanabria (FCP); 139; Nunzio Venuto (Lbt); 98; Wayne Simmons (F); 77	Joseph Cordiano
Burlington; February 8, 2007	Joan Lougheed; 9,365	Joyce Savoline; 11,143	Cory Judson; 1,310	Frank de Jong; 734	Paul Micelli (F); 106; John Turmel (Ind); 90	Cam Jackson
Markham; February 8, 2007	Michael Chan; 9,080	Alex Yuan; 6,420	Janice Hagan; 1,492	Bernadette Manning; 999	Cathy McKeever (F); 159; Patrick Redmond (FCP); 135; Jay Miller (Lbt); 126	Tony Wong
