= Anthony Forster =

Anthony Forster may refer to:

- Anthony Forster (political scientist), political scientist and vice-chancellor of the University of Essex, UK
- Anthony Forster (Australian politician) (1813–1897), politician, financier and newspaper owner/editor in colonial South Australia
- Anthony Forster (MP), Member of Parliament for Abingdon, 1566–1572
- Anthony Forster, mayor of Markham, 1889–1892

== See also ==
- Anthony Foster, Anglo-Irish judge and politician
