= Oversight board =

An oversight board is a governance structure, responsible for ensuring compliance with the law or other standards.

Specifically, oversight board may refer to:

== United States federal government ==
- Privacy and Civil Liberties Oversight Board, an advisory agency to the President of the United States
- Intelligence Oversight Board, responsible for examining violations of the laws and directives governing clandestine surveillance
- Public Company Accounting Oversight Board, a nonprofit corporation created by Congress to oversee the audits of public companies and others
- Financial Stability Oversight Board, responsible for monitoring the operation of the Troubled Asset Relief Program
- Financial Oversight and Management Board of Puerto Rico, created by the PROMESA act in response to the Puerto Rican government-debt crisis

== Other ==
- Professional Oversight Board, formerly an agency of the United Kingdom's Financial Conduct Authority
- Public Interest Oversight Board, an independent international organisation contributing to the International Federation of Accountants's work
- Oversight Board (Meta), established by Meta (then Facebook) to take decisions concerning censorship and free speech
  - Real Facebook Oversight Board, entity that reviews Facebook content
- Civilian police oversight agency, a citizen organisation monitoring police officer conduct
  - Nashville Community Oversight Board, the civilian oversight agency monitoring police in Nashville, Tennessee
