= Internal affairs (law enforcement) =

Division of a law enforcement agency

Emblem of the Internal Affairs Unit, National Police Corps (Spain)

Internal affairs (often known as IA) is a division of a law enforcement agency that investigates incidents and possible suspicions of criminal and professional misconduct attributed to members of the parent force. It is thus a mechanism of limited self-governance, "a police force policing itself". The names used by internal affairs divisions vary between agencies and jurisdictions; for example, they may be known as the internal investigations division (usually referred to as IID), professional standards or responsibility, inspector or inspectorate general, internal review board, or similar.

Due to the sensitive nature of this responsibility, in many departments, officers employed in an internal affairs unit are not in a detective command but report directly to the head of internal affairs who themselves typically report directly to the head of the parent agency, or to a board of civilian commissioners.

Internal affairs investigators are generally bound by stringent rules when conducting their investigations. For example, in California, the Peace Officers Bill of Rights (POBR) is a mandated set of rules found in the California Government Code which applies to most peace officers (law enforcement officers) within California. The bill, among other provisions, restricts where and when a peace officer may be interviewed regarding the subject of an investigation; codifies the right of the peace officer being questioned to have a personal and/or legal representative present at most proceedings; guarantees the right of appeal to any non-probationary peace officer subject to punitive action by the agency; and requires that a peace officer being interviewed regarding an alleged criminal act be advised of their constitutional rights and protections (I.e. that they be Mirandized).

== Function ==
The internal affairs function is not an enforcement function, but rather a policing function that works to report only. The concept of internal affairs is very broad and unique to each police department. However, the sole purpose to having an internal affairs unit is to investigate and find the truth to what occurred when an officer is accused of misconduct. An investigation can also give insight on a policy itself that may have issues.

== Investigations ==
The circumstances of the complaint determine who will be investigating the complaint. The investigation of alleged misconduct by police officers can be conducted by the internal affairs unit, an executive police officer, or an outside agency. In the Salt Lake City Police Department, the Civilian Review Board will also investigate the complaint, but they will do so independently. When the investigation begins, everything is documented and all employees, complainants, and witnesses are interviewed. Any physical evidence is analyzed and past behaviors of the officer in question are reviewed. Dispatch tapes, police reports, tickets, audio, and videotapes are all reviewed if available. Many controversies arise because an officer investigating police misconduct may show favoritism and/or hold grudges particularly when a single officer is conducting the investigation. Some departments hire uninvolved officers or include another department or a special unit to conduct the investigation.

=== Small agencies ===
Larger agencies have the resources to have separate units for internal affairs, but smaller agencies – which do not have the luxury – are more common, with 87% of police departments in the United States employing 25 or fewer sworn officers. Smaller agencies that do not have sufficient resources may have the executive officer, the accused's supervisor, or another police department conduct an investigation. The state police may also be asked to investigate criminal behavior, but they do not deal in minor misconduct or rule violation cases. However, allowing another department to investigate can reportedly result in lower morale among the officers because it is said it can appear as an admission that the department cannot handle their own affairs.

== Civilian review board ==
Several police departments in the United States have been compelled to institute citizen review or investigation of police misconduct complaints in response to community perception that internal affairs investigations are biased in favor of police officers.

For example, San Francisco, California, has its Office of Citizen Complaints, created by voter initiative in 1983, in which citizens who have never been members of the San Francisco Police Department investigate complaints of police misconduct filed against members of the San Francisco Police Department. Washington, DC, has a similar office, created in 1999, known as the Office of Police Complaints.

In the state of Utah, the Internal Affairs Division must properly file a complaint before the committee can officially investigate. Complaints involving police misuse of force will be brought to the Civilian Review Board, but citizens can request the committee to investigate any other issues of misconduct.

== See also ==
- Community policing
- Civilian oversight of law enforcement
- Infernal Affairs, 2002 Hong Kong film
- List of police complaint authorities
  - Law Enforcement Conduct Commission (New South Wales, Australia)
  - Independent Broad-based Anti-corruption Commission (Victoria, Australia)
  - Special Investigations Unit (Ontario, Canada)
  - Fiosrú – the Office of the Police Ombudsman (Ireland)
  - Independent Police Conduct Authority (New Zealand)
  - Investigative Committee (Russia)
  - His Majesty's Inspectorate of Constabulary and Fire & Rescue Services (UK)
  - Independent Office for Police Conduct (UK)
- Provost (military police)
