= Markham—Unionville =

Markham—Unionville could refer to:

- Markham—Unionville (federal electoral district)
- Markham—Unionville (provincial electoral district)
