= 1973 Ontario Liberal Party leadership election =

Canadian provincial party election

- Date: October 27–28, 1973
- Convention: Royal York Hotel, Toronto, Ontario
- Resigning leader: Robert Nixon
- Won by: Robert Nixon
- Ballots: 3
- Candidates: 4 (6)

The Ontario Liberal Party leadership election, 1973, was held on October 27–28, 1973 to replace Robert Nixon who had announced his retirement in 1972. After a change of heart he reversed his decision to retire and entered the leadership race to retain his position. He defeated Norman Cafik on the third ballot by 317 votes.

== Background ==
On February 12, 1972, at a party annual meeting, Robert Nixon announced that he was resigning as party leader. Initially five names were presented as possible leadership contenders. Murray Gaunt, a farmer; Donald Deacon, MPP and investment dealer; James Bullbrook, lawyer; Vern Singer, MPP and lawyer; and Phil Givens, former mayor of Toronto. Nixon agreed to stay on as party leader until a leadership convention was held.

Deacon was the first to announce his candidacy on May 15, 1973. He said he would reduce the sales tax to 5% and make up the revenue by taxing services that the wealthy use. He also said that he would work on proposals for a guaranteed annual income. He was endorsed by Margaret Campbell, Leonard Braithwaite and federal MP Barney Danson.

On August 15, 1973, Nixon announced that he was reversing his earlier decision and would be a candidate in the October convention. Changes for the better in Liberal fortunes had figured into his decision.

Other contenders to enter the race were Ted Culp, a teacher from Toronto (September 5), MPP Eddie Sargent (September 11), Michael Houlton, a promoter (October 1), and MP Norman Cafik (October 3). Culp later quit the race on October 18. Culp, who said he ran to highlight issues such as wage and price controls and school curricula found his efforts stymied by the other candidates. He said, "Unfortunately, my purpose was largely obscured by the strange tactics of Deacon and Sargent, who seem to be preoccupied with knifing Bob Nixon in the back. Their performance fully explains why they are still backbenchers."

According to Peter Oliver, the campaign was rather tedious until Vern Singer was found to have received a $25,000 retainer from a developer working for Ontario Hydro. Sargent accused Nixon of suppressing the information calling it 'hush money'. Singer resigned as Deputy Leader and sued Sargent for defamation of character. On the eve of the convention, Sargent withdrew from the race.

== Convention ==
On Saturday October 27, 2,081 Liberal delegates gathered at the Royal York Hotel. The speeches took place during the evening. Each contender was given 25 minutes to speak. During Deacon's address, party president Joe Cruden inadvertently cut him off five minutes early. Deacon continued to speak over shouts of "time". The mistake appeared to deflate his campaign.

Balloting began on noon on Sunday, October 28. Houlton was eliminated on the first ballot with only 11 votes. On the second ballot, Deacon was eliminated. He then walked across the convention floor and offer his support to Nixon. While Cafik supporters were incredulous given Deacon's attacks on Nixon during the campaign, Deacon explained his move by saying, "I know Bob, and I know I can count on his integrity."

On the third and final ballot, Nixon defeated Cafik by 317 votes. Nixon continued as party leader. He appointed Deacon as Deputy Leader and Jim Breithaupt as House Leader.

== Ballot results ==
Delegate support by ballot
Candidate	1st ballot		2nd ballot		3rd ballot	
Name	Votes cast	%	Votes cast	%	Votes cast	%
Robert Nixon	730	42.5	768	45.3	922	57.7
Norman Cafik	574	33.4	613	36.1	675	42.3
Donald Deacon	402	23.4	316	18.6	Endorsed Nixon	
Michael Houlton	11	0.6	No endorsement			
Total	1,717	100.0	1,697	100.0	1,597	100.0
