= List of police complaints authorities =

This is a list of notable authorities, agencies and similar bodies that are responsible for investigating or responding to complaints about police.

== Asia ==
=== Hong Kong ===
- Independent Police Complaints Council

=== India ===
- State Police Complaints Authority
  - District Police Complaints Authority

=== Philippines ===
- National Police Commission

=== Singapore ===
- Internal Affairs Office, Singapore Police Force

=== South Korea ===
- National Police Commission

== Africa ==
=== South Africa ===
- Independent Police Investigative Directorate

== Europe ==
=== Ireland ===
- Fiosrú – the Office of the Police Ombudsman

=== Russia ===
- Investigative Committee of Russia

=== Sweden ===
- Swedish Police Authority

=== United Kingdom ===
==== England and Wales ====
- Independent Office for Police Conduct (since 2018)

===== Defunct =====
- Police Complaints Board (1977–1985)
- Police Complaints Authority (1985–2004)
- Independent Police Complaints Commission (2004–2018)

==== Northern Ireland ====
- Northern Ireland Policing Board

==== Scotland ====
- Police Investigations and Review Commissioner (since 2013)

===== Defunct =====
- Police Complaints Commissioner for Scotland (2007–2013)

== North America ==
=== Canada ===
==== National ====
- Civilian Review and Complaints Commission for the Royal Canadian Mounted Police
- Military Police Complaints Commission

==== Provincial ====
===== Alberta =====
- Alberta Serious Incident Response Team

===== British Columbia =====
- Independent Investigations Office

===== Nova Scotia =====
- Serious Incident Response Team

==== Province-wide ====
- Office of the Independent Police Review Director
- Ontario Civilian Police Commission
- Special Investigations Unit

===== Local =====
- Toronto Police Services Board
- York Region Police Services Board

=== United States ===
==== Local ====
- Nashville, Tennessee – Nashville Community Oversight Board
- New York City, New York – Civilian Complaint Review Board
- Los Angeles, California – Coalition Against Police Abuse (unofficial community organisation)

== Oceania ==
=== Australia ===
==== National ====
- National Anti-Corruption Commission
- Australian Defence Force Investigative Service

===== Defunct =====
- Australian Commission for Law Enforcement Integrity

==== New South Wales ====
- Independent Commission Against Corruption
- Law Enforcement Conduct Commission

==== Queensland ====
- Crime and Corruption Commission

==== Western Australia ====
- Corruption and Crime Commission

==== Victoria ====
- Independent Broad-based Anti-corruption Commission

=== New Zealand ===
- Independent Police Conduct Authority

== See also ==
- Cop Block
- Copwatch
- Police authority
- Police board
