= York Centre (provincial electoral district) =

Provincial electoral district in Ontario, Canada

Coordinates: 43.7627°N 79.4456°W

Ontario electoral district
- York Centre in relation to the other Toronto ridings (2015 boundaries)

Provincial electoral district
- Legislature: Legislative Assembly of Ontario
MPP
Michael Kerzner
Progressive Conservative
- First contested: 1999
- Last contested: 2025

Demographics
- Population (2021): 108,307
- Electors (2025): 76,546
- Area (km²): 35
- Pop. density (per km²): 3,094.5
- Census division: Toronto
- Census subdivision: Toronto

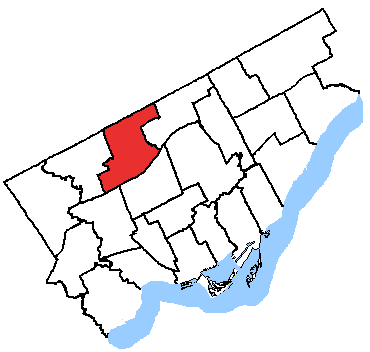
York Centre from 2003 to 2018

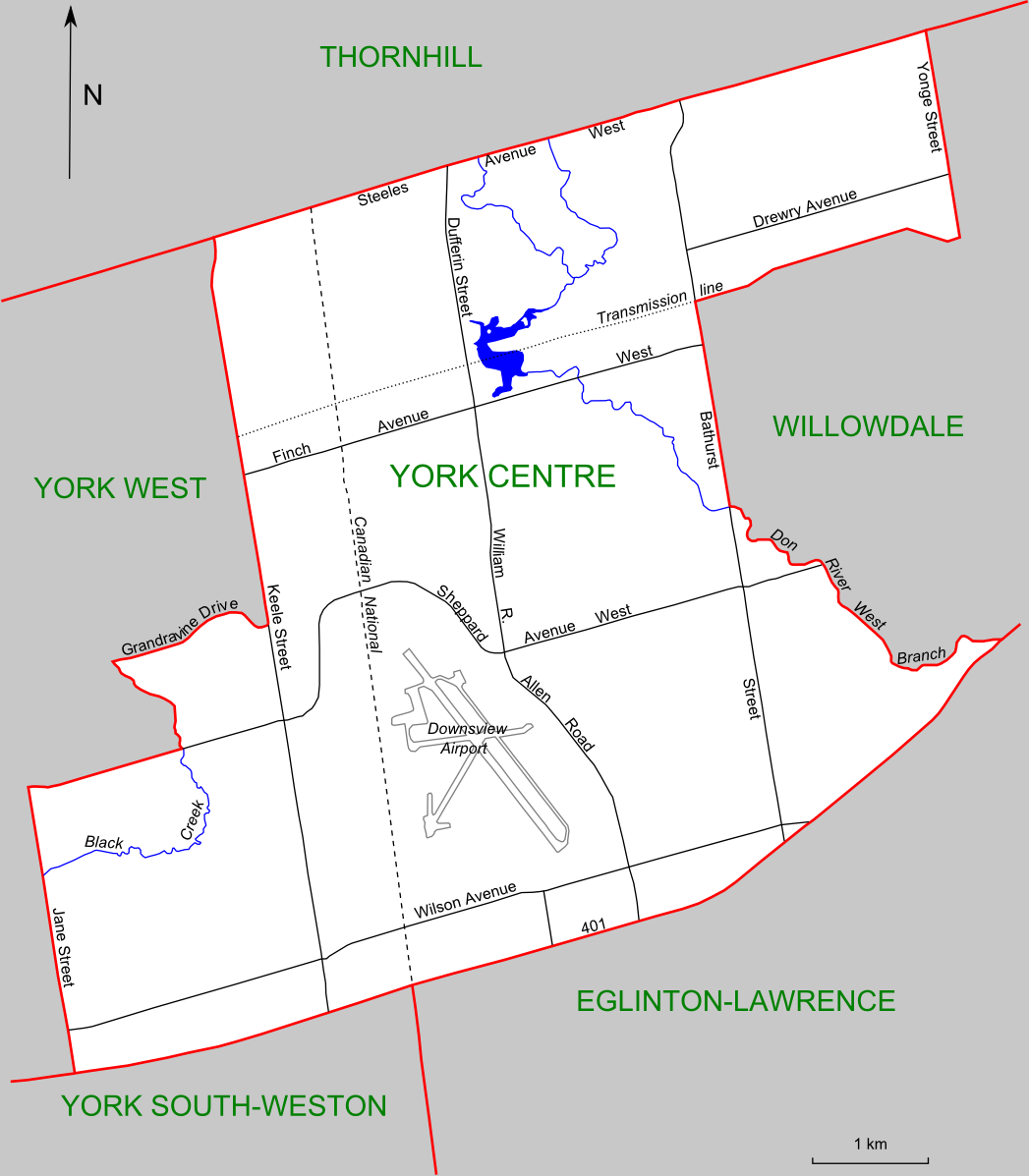
Map of York Centre under 2003 boundaries

York Centre is a provincial electoral district in Ontario, Canada, that has been the name of ridings in the Legislative Assembly of Ontario three different times. It was created initially in 1955 from the southern part of York North. It was dissolved in 1963 when it was split into three ridings called Yorkview, Downsview and Armourdale. In 1967, it was reconstituted north of Steeles in the township of Markham. This lasted until 1999 when it was dissolved into Markham—Unionville. The name was given to a new riding formed in its original location south of Steeles. It remains as an existing riding today.

== Boundaries ==
=== 1955 to 1963 ===
The original boundaries consisted of Steeles Avenue West to the north, Yonge Street to the East, Lawrence Avenue West to the south, and the Humber River to the west.

=== 1999 to present ===
York Centre consists of the part of the city of Toronto within the North York district bounded on the north by the northern city limit, and on the east, south and west by a line drawn from the city limit south along Yonge Street, west along the hydroelectric transmission line north of Finch Avenue West, south along Bathurst Street, southeast along the Don River West Branch, southwest and west along Highway 401, north along Jane Street, east along Sheppard Avenue West, northwest along Black Creek, east along Grandravine Drive, and north along Keele Street to the city limit.

== History ==
The provincial electoral district was created in 1999 when provincial ridings were defined to have the same borders as federal ridings.

Before 1999, the name York Centre was assigned to a completely different riding located in York Region north of Toronto with none of the same territory as the current York Centre. In 1999, much of the old York Centre was absorbed by the new riding of Vaughan—King—Aurora. The former riding was Wilson Heights.

== Members of Provincial Parliament ==
York Centre
Assembly	Years	Member	Party
Riding created from York North
25th	1955–1959	Thomas Graham	Progressive Conservative
26th	1959–1963	Vernon Singer	Liberal
Riding dissolved into Yorkview, Downsview and Armourdale
Riding re-created
28th	1967–1971	Donald Deacon	Liberal
29th	1971–1975	Donald Deacon	Liberal
30th	1975–1977	Alfred Stong	Liberal
31st	1977–1981	Alfred Stong	Liberal
32nd	1981–1985	Don Cousens	Progressive Conservative
33rd	1985–1987	Don Cousens	Progressive Conservative
34th	1987–1990	Greg Sorbara	Liberal
35th	1990–1995	Greg Sorbara	Liberal
36th	1995–1999	Al Palladini	Progressive Conservative
Riding dissolved into Vaughan—King—Aurora and Markham
Riding re-created from Downsview and Wilson Heights
37th	1999–2003	Monte Kwinter	Liberal
38th	2003–2007	Monte Kwinter	Liberal
39th	2007–2011	Monte Kwinter	Liberal
40th	2011–2014	Monte Kwinter	Liberal
41st	2014–2018	Monte Kwinter	Liberal
42nd	2018–2021	Roman Baber	Progressive Conservative
42nd	2021–2022	Roman Baber	Independent
43rd	2022–2025	Michael Kerzner	Progressive Conservative
44th	2025–present	Michael Kerzner	Progressive Conservative
Sourced from the Ontario Legislative Assembly

== Election results ==
Winning party in each polling division of York Centre at the 2025 Ontario general election

2025 Ontario general election
Party	Candidate	Votes	%	±%
Progressive Conservative	Michael Kerzner	16,416	54.06	+8.03
Liberal	Sam Nestico	10,823	35.64	+3.70
New Democratic	Natalie Van Halteren	1,700	5.60	–8.39
Green	Courtney Martin	658	2.17	–0.67
New Blue	Johnny Blythe	309	1.02	–0.44
Special Needs	Lionel Poizner	212	0.70	+0.26
Populist	Jeffrey Anisman	140	0.46	N/A
Moderate	Parviz Isgandadrov	111	0.37	+0.09
Total valid votes		30,369	98.88	+0.07
Total rejected, unmarked and declined ballots		345	1.12	–0.07
Turnout		30,714	39.67	+0.73
Eligible voters		76,546		
Progressive Conservative hold		Swing		+2.17
Source: Elections Ontario

Winning party in each polling division of York Centre at the 2022 Ontario general election

2022 Ontario general election
Party	Candidate	Votes	%	±%	Expenditures
Progressive Conservative	Michael Kerzner	12,947	46.03	−4.12	$79,866
Liberal	Shelley Brown	8,984	31.94	+10.54	$74,566
New Democratic	Frank Chu	3,935	13.99	−9.45	$16,511
Green	Alison Lowney	799	2.84	+0.55	$0
Ontario Party	Nick Balaskas	679	2.41		$988
New Blue	Don Pincivero	411	1.46		$0
None of the Above	Mark Dewdney	169	0.60	−0.67	$0
Special Needs	Lionel Wayne Poizner	124	0.44		$0
Moderate	Parviz Isgandarov	80	0.28	−0.09	$780
Total valid votes/expense limit		28,128	98.81	+0.30	$102,341
Total rejected, unmarked, and declined ballots		339	1.19	-0.30	
Turnout		28,467	38.94	-13.98	
Eligible voters		72,576			
Progressive Conservative gain from Independent		Swing		−7.33	
Source(s): "Summary of Valid Votes Cast for Each Candidate" (PDF). Elections Ontario. 2022. Archived from the original on May 18, 2023.; "Statistical Summary by Electoral District" (PDF). Elections Ontario. 2022. Archived from the original on May 21, 2023.

2018 Ontario general election
Party	Candidate	Votes	%	±%
Progressive Conservative	Roman Baber	18,434	50.15	+19.29
New Democratic	Andrea Vásquez Jiménez	8,617	23.44	+7.07
Liberal	Ramon Estaris	7,865	21.39	-26.72
Green	Roma Lyon	843	2.29	-0.96
None of the Above	Cherie Ann Day	467	1.27	
Libertarian	Benjamin Kamminga	398	1.08	
Moderate	Alexander Leonov	137	0.37	
Total valid votes		36,761	98.51	
Total rejected, unmarked and declined ballots		556	1.49	
Turnout		37,317	52.92	
Eligible voters		70,520		
Progressive Conservative notional gain from Liberal		Swing		+23.01
Source: Elections Ontario

2014 general election redistributed results
Party	Vote	%
Liberal	14,556	48.12
Progressive Conservative	9,333	30.85
New Democratic	4,953	16.37
Green	984	3.25
Others	425	1.40

2014 Ontario general election
Party	Candidate	Votes	%	±%
Liberal	Monte Kwinter	16,935	47.22	+2.68
Progressive Conservative	Avi Yufest	11,125	31.02	-4.50
New Democratic	John Fagan	5,645	15.74	+1.61
Green	Josh Borenstein	1,156	3.27	+1.62
Freedom	Laurence Cherniak	489	1.38	+1.05
Total valid votes		35,350	100.0	
Liberal hold		Swing		+3.66
Source: Elections Ontario

2011 Ontario general election
Party	Candidate	Votes	%	±%
Liberal	Monte Kwinter	14,694	45.36	-3.37
Progressive Conservative	Michael Mostyn	11,506	35.52	+3.24
New Democratic	John Fagan	4,579	14.13	+3.26
Libertarian	David Epstein	846	2.61	
Green	Yuriy Shevyryov	535	1.65	-4.81
Independent	Jeff Pancer	127	0.39	
Freedom	Ron Tal	108	0.33	
Total valid votes		32,395	100.00	
Total rejected, unmarked and declined ballots		325	0.99	
Turnout		32,720	45.74	
Eligible voters		71,531		
Liberal hold		Swing		-3.31
Source: Elections Ontario

2007 Ontario general election
Party	Candidate	Votes	%	±%
Liberal	Monte Kwinter	16,646	48.73	-10.68
Progressive Conservative	Igor Toutchinski	11,028	32.28	+7.45
New Democratic	Claudia Rodriguez	3,713	10.87	-0.17
Green	Marija Minic	2,207	6.46	+1.73
Family Coalition	Marilyn Carvalho	568	1.66	
Total valid votes			100.0	

2003 Ontario general election
Party	Candidate	Votes	%	±%
Liberal	Monte Kwinter	18,808	59.41	-1.68
Progressive Conservative	Dan Cullen	7,862	24.83	-1.6
New Democratic	Matthew Norrish	3,494	11.04	+0.34
Green	Constantine Kritsonis	1,496	4.73	
Total valid votes		31,660	100.0	

1999 Ontario general election
Party	Candidate	Votes	%
Liberal	Monte Kwinter	21,250	61.09
Progressive Conservative	Robert Hausman	9,192	26.43
New Democratic	Norm Jesin	3,721	10.70
Natural Law	Angus Hunt	621	1.79
Total valid votes		34,784	100.0

== 2007 electoral reform referendum ==
2007 Ontario electoral reform referendum
Side	Votes	%
First Past the Post	19,223	59.8
Mixed member proportional	12,907	40.2
Total valid votes	32,130	100.0

== Historic election results ==
=== 1987 boundaries ===
1995 Ontario general election
Party	Candidate	Votes	%	±%
Progressive Conservative	Al Palladini	37,897	48.94	+25.24
Liberal	Mario Ferri	29,150	37.65	-8.03
New Democratic	T. S. Joseph Thevarkunnel	6,698	8.65	-21.97
Family Coalition	Giuseppi Gori	1,891	2.44	
Libertarian	Robert Ede	1,792	2.31	
Total valid votes		77,428	100.0	
Source:Elections Ontario

1990 Ontario general election
Party	Candidate	Votes	%	±%
Liberal	Greg Sorbara	28,056	45.57	-16.05
New Democratic	Laurie Orrent	18850	30.62	+12.33
Progressive Conservative	Don McGuire	14,656	23.81	+3.73
Total valid votes		61,562	100.0	
Source: The Toronto Daily Star (Note: 390 out of 391 polls reporting.)

1987 Ontario general election
Party	Candidate	Votes	%	±%
Liberal	Greg Sorbara	26,096	62.44	+28.61
Progressive Conservative	Doug Mason	8,605	19.83	-30.43
New Democratic	Joe Licastro	7,692	17.73	+6.24
Total valid votes		43.393	100.0	
Source: The Toronto Daily Star (Note: 301 out of 308 polls reporting.)

=== 1974 boundaries ===
1985 Ontario general election
Party	Candidate	Votes	%	±%
Progressive Conservative	Donald Cousens	29,652	50.40	+3.09
Liberal	Ron Maheu	19,484	33.12	-9.37
New Democratic	Diane Meaghan	7,089	12.05	+2.55
Independent	Stewart Cole	2,607	4.43	
Total valid votes		58,832	100.0	
Source:Ottawa Citizen

1981 Ontario general election
Party	Candidate	Votes	%	±%
Progressive Conservative	Donald Cousens	18,369	47.31	+7.55
Liberal	Alfred Stong	16,495	42.49	-1.92
New Democratic	John Campey	3,689	9.50	-6.33
Total valid votes		38,823	100.0	
Source: The Windsor Star

1977 Ontario general election
Party	Candidate	Votes	%	±%
Liberal	Alfred Stong	17,608	44.41	+3.69
Progressive Conservative	Bill Corcoran	15,768	39.76	+2.95
New Democratic	Chris Olsen	6,277	15.83	-6.16
Total valid votes		39,653	100.0	
Source: Canadian Press

1975 Ontario general election
Party	Candidate	Votes	%	±%
Liberal	Alfred Stong	14,347	40.72	-1.55
Progressive Conservative	Tony Roman	12,968	36.81	-4.86
New Democratic	Tony Snedker	7,748	21.99	+5.93
Independent	John White	171	0.49	
Total valid votes		35,234	100.0	
Source: Canadian Press

=== 1966 boundaries ===
1971 Ontario general election
Party	Candidate	Votes	%	±%
Liberal	Donald Deacon	14,885	42.27	+1.66
Progressive Conservative	Tony Roman	14,674	41.67	+5.06
New Democratic	Roy Clifton	5,657	16.06	-6.73
Total valid votes		35,216	100.0	
Source: Canadian Press

1967 Ontario general election
Party	Candidate	Votes	%	±%
Liberal	Donald Deacon	9,991	40.61	+4.04
Progressive Conservative	Lorne Wells	9,006	36.61	+4.72
New Democratic	Jim Norton	5,606	22.79	-8.12
Total valid votes		24,603	100.0	
Source: Canadian Press

=== 1950s ===
1959 Ontario general election
Party	Candidate	Votes	%	±%
Liberal	Vernon Singer	15,702	36.57	+2.12
Progressive Conservative	Thomas Graham	13,695	31.89	-5.82
Co-operative Commonwealth	Fred Young	13,272	30.91	+4.94
Independent	George Rolland	270	0.63	
Total valid votes		42,939	100.0	
Source: Canadian Press

1955 Ontario general election
Party	Candidate	Votes	%
Progressive Conservative	Thomas Graham	12,648	37.71
Liberal	Frederick Joseph McMahon	11,553	34.45
Co-operative Commonwealth	Fred Young	8,710	25.97
Labor–Progressive	Stephen Endicott	646	1.93
Total valid votes		33,537	100.0
Source: Canadian Press

== See also ==
- List of Ontario provincial electoral districts
- Canadian provincial electoral districts
