= Donald Deacon =

Canadian politician (1920–2003)

Donald Deacon OC OPEI MC
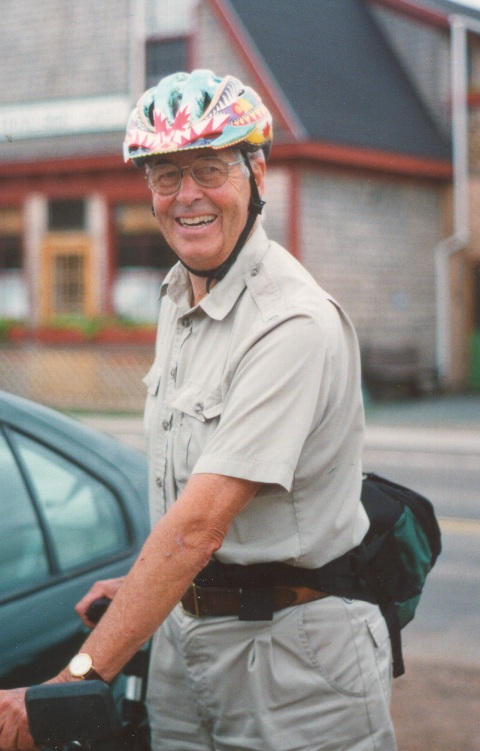

Ontario MPP
- In office 1967–1975
- Preceded by: New riding
- Succeeded by: Alfred Stong
- Constituency: York Centre

Personal details
- Born: April 24, 1920 Toronto, Ontario, Canada
- Died: September 16, 2003 (aged 83) Charlottetown, Prince Edward Island, Canada
- Party: Liberal
- Spouse: Florence Campbell
- Children: 6
- Occupation: Business executive

Military service
- Allegiance: Canadian
- Branch/service: Royal Canadian Artillery
- Years of service: 1942-1945
- Rank: Captain
- Awards: Military Cross

Donald MacKay Deacon OC OPEI MC (April 24, 1920 – September 16, 2003) was a politician in Ontario, Canada. He was a Liberal member of the Legislative Assembly of Ontario from 1967 to 1975 who represented the riding of York Centre.

== Background ==
Deacon was born and raised in a family of ten children in Toronto, Ontario and attended the University of Toronto Schools. In 1942, he volunteered to serve in the 3rd Medium Regiment, Royal Canadian Artillery during World War II, rising to the rank of captain. Deacon, a Forward Observation Officer, travelled with front line infantry in order to direct artillery fire via radio transmission. In later years, he often commented at how accurately George G. Blackburn had captured the role of a FOO in his book The Guns of Normandy.

Deacon was mentioned in dispatches as his Battery of Nova Scotian gunners fought its way across France, Belgium, the Netherlands and into Germany. He was awarded the Military Cross for risking his life to save soldiers under fire when his radio failed. King George VI was to present Deacon with the Military Cross. After six months helping to re-build post-war life in Holland, instead of heading to England, Deacon chose to accept passage on the first ship home to Canada. His military service ended safely as he walked up to his parents' home on Christmas morning 1945.

Following the war, Deacon married Florence Campbell, sister of his best friend John Campbell. They moved to Deacon's family farm outside of Unionville, Ontario where they raised a family of six (Campbell, David, Martha, Douglas, Richard and Colin Deacon). He was one of the founders of Markham Stouffville Hospital and also served as president of the Canadian Club of Toronto. Deacon spent most of his working career in business in the financial sector, serving as chair of F.H. Deacon Hodgson Ltd.

== Politics ==
Deacon was first elected to serve on the town council of Markham, Ontario as the deputy reeve. He was elected to the Legislative Assembly of Ontario as a Liberal Member of Provincial Parliament (MPP) in the 1967 provincial election, and re-elected in the 1971 election, serving the Toronto area riding of York Centre until he resigned from the legislature in March 1975.

In 1973, Deacon ran for the Ontario Liberal leadership when Robert Nixon indicated he was stepping aside. Nixon changed his mind, and was re-elected leader with Deacon finishing in third place behind Nixon and Norman Cafik. When Prime Minister Pierre Trudeau appointed his friend and political colleague Barney Danson as Canada's Minister of Defence in 1976, Deacon worked with Danson and Jacques Hébert to create Katimavik, a national service program designed to enable unemployed youth to help others and themselves at the same time.

== Later life ==
Deacon moved to Prince Edward Island in 1981, where he was the founder and chair of Atlantic Canada's first venture capital fund, Atlantic Ventures Trust. He also continued his passion as an active volunteer, becoming president of the PEI Red Cross, chair of the Atlantic Provinces Economic Council, a board member of Mount Allison University (the alma mater of his maternal grandfather, The Hon. Henry Emmerson), a director of the SmartRisk Foundation and National Commissioner of Scouts Canada. Deacon was deeply honoured when his service to Scouts Canada was recognized with his being presented with the Silver Wolf Award by Queen Elizabeth II at a ceremony at Buckingham Palace.

Deacon's greatest passion grew from CN Railway's decision to close the Prince Edward Island Railway in July 1989. Florence and Donald loved going on walking and cycling vacations around the world, and had long felt that the closure would hold great tourism and community development potential. A standing-room only community meeting on August 3, 1989, led to the creation of Rail-to-Trails PEI with its mission being to do what was necessary to convert the soon to be abandoned rail lines into a provincial trail system. Deacon became the group's founding chairman.

On September 18, 1992, at a Canada 125 board meeting held in Summerside PEI, a resolution was passed to support the creation of the Trans Canada Trail as the legacy project for Canada's 125th anniversary. Deacon became an early and active member of the Trans Canada Trail board of directors, focusing much of his attention on the all-important fundraising efforts. To this end, Deacon's signature can be found on the certificates issued to Canadians who donated $35.00 to "buy a metre" of the Trail, one of the Trail's earliest fundraising efforts. Through the 1990s, corporations and wealthy families across the country could count on a visit from Deacon and others, encouraging them to "buy a kilometre" of the Trail. In 2000, then in their 80s, Florence and Donald proudly completed their Millennium Project: to bike 200 km on the Trail in each of Canada's provinces and territories (except Nunavut), making it as far north as Tuktoyaktuk.

In 1987, Deacon was invested as a Member of the Order of Canada. In 2003, he was presented with the Order of Prince Edward Island and was promoted to Officer of the Order of Canada.

Exactly one week prior to his death in September 2003, Deacon was interviewed by Shelagh Rogers on CBC Radio's Sounds Like Canada. It was her first interview in a series about Order of Canada recipients. This moving conversation, which Rogers often replayed as one of her favorites, included Deacon recounting a defining moment with a close friend in the final hours of World War II. Deacon and his friend were sitting on top of their Scout cars, waiting as the infantry cleared out a machine gun nest along the road ahead. They asked one another how the horrible waste of life that they had just survived could be prevented in future. The two men agreed that all they could do was to go home, raise a family of caring individuals, contribute to the lives of others in their communities, and encourage everyone they met to travel the world so they could experience and gain respect for other cultures and people. Their conversation ended as they were given the all clear. His friend started his Scout car, proceeded down the road ahead of Deacon and was killed instantly as his vehicle passed over an anti-tank mine.

The war ended two days later. Deacon carried that conversation and commitment with him throughout his life.

Deacon died of leukemia at a hospital in Charlottetown in September 2003. He was 83.
