= Tony Roman =

Canadian politician (1936–1992)

Anthony Roman

Mayor of Markham, Ontario
- In office 1970–1984
- Preceded by: Alma Walker
- Succeeded by: Carole Bell

Chair of York Region
- In office 1984–1984
- Preceded by: Robert Forhan
- Succeeded by: Eldred R. King

Member of Parliament for York North
- In office 1984–1988
- Preceded by: John A. Gamble
- Succeeded by: Maurizio Bevilacqua

Mayor of Markham, Ontario
- In office 1988–1992
- Preceded by: Carole Bell
- Succeeded by: Frank Scarpitti

Personal details
- Born: January 17, 1936 Veľký Ruskov, Czechoslovakia
- Died: October 30, 1992 (aged 56) Markham, Ontario, Canada
- Party: Independent
- Other political affiliations: Progressive Conservative Party of Ontario
- Profession: Businessman

Anthony Roman (January 17, 1936 – October 30, 1992) was a politician in Ontario, Canada.

== Early years ==
Roman was born in Veľký Ruskov, Czechoslovakia (today Nový Ruskov, Slovakia) and eventually settled in Canada. He studied agricultural science and was a businessman before entering politics.

== Municipal career ==
Roman served as the Township Councillor (1966–1968), Mayor of the Town of Markham, Ontario, from 1970 to 1984, Chair of the Regional Municipality of York in 1984.

== Provincial politics ==
Roman was the Ontario Progressive Conservative Party candidate in York Centre in the 1975 Ontario general election, placing second behind Liberal Alfred Stong.

== Federal politics ==
In 1984, Roman was elected as an independent Member of Parliament (MP) for the riding of York North from 1984 to 1988.

Roman won the 1984 election in York North largely because of the controversial views of Progressive Conservative MP John Gamble.

Because the PC and Liberal candidates were unpopular, community leaders asked Roman to stand as a "Coalition Candidate". Roman used the Progressive Conservative blue and Liberal red on his signs, and drew supporters from both parties.

He was one of the very few MPs in recent decades to be elected as an independent candidate in the House of Commons of Canada.

== Return to municipal politics ==
Roman did not seek re-election to the House of Commons in 1988 but instead endorsed Micheal O'Brien as the Progressive Conservative Candidate. O'Brien was one of the community leaders who had convinced Roman to run as a "coalition" independent in 1984. Roman was returned as mayor of Markham, defeating Carole Bell, who had succeeded Roman as mayor upon his appointment as York chairman in 1984. He was easily re-elected in the 1991 municipal elections.

== Community involvement ==
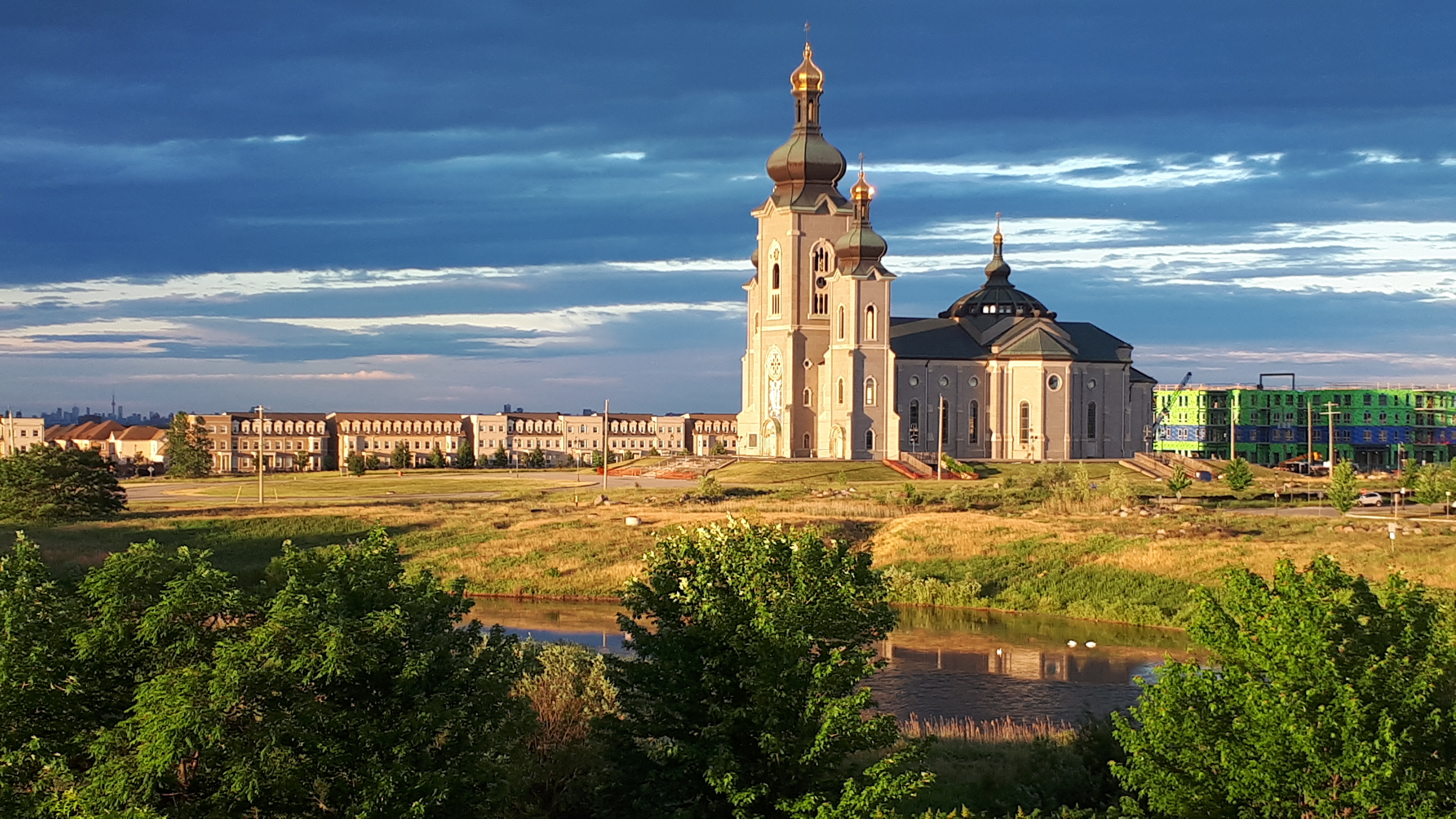
Cathedral of the Transfiguration in Markham

Roman (along with financial backing from his uncle and businessman Stephen Boleslav Roman) was instrumental in the design and construction of the Cathedral of the Transfiguration, a large Slovak Byzantine church built on open land in northwestern Markham.

== Death ==
Roman died while still in office as Mayor in 1992.

== Honours ==
Roman's name lives on in Markham:

- Anthony Roman Avenue, a small residential street in Cathedraltown, Ontario
- Anthony Roman Centre - Markham Civic Centre - Flato Markham Theatre - Unionville High School
- Anthony Roman Award
- Tony Roman Memorial Tournament - ice hockey ended in 2013 after 40 years

== Electoral record ==
1984 Canadian federal election: York North
| Party | Candidate | Votes |
|---|---|---|
| Independent | Tony Roman | 32,200 |
| Progressive Conservative | John A. Gamble | 27,955 |
| Liberal | Aldo Tollis | 18,034 |
| New Democratic | Doris Schwar | 10,077 |

== See also ==
- List of mayors of Markham, Ontario
