= List of mayors of Markham, Ontario =

This is a list of mayors of the city of Markham, Ontario as well as reeves of Markham Village and Township of Markham

== York County Era (1850-1971) ==
Following the passage of the Baldwin Act in 1849 (now Municipal Incorporation Act) the Home District was abolished and local governments were created. The Village of Markham (a police village called Markham Village) was formed in 1850 (with York County, Ontario) and a local council led by a reeve.

From 1850 to 1873 the reeve was appointed position. On November 20, 1872, the Warden of York County signed the By-law of Incorporation, which resulted in the election of the reeve (and Council) for the Village of Markham.

- 1. Amos Wright 1850
- 2. David Reesor 1851
- 3. George P Dickson 1852
- 4. Henry Miller 1853-1855
- 5. David Reesor 1856-57
- 6. William Marr Button 1858 - Lieutenant Colonel of the 1st York Light Dragoons (now The Governor General's Horse Guards) and grandson of Captain John Button, founder of the 1st York Light Dragoons (Button's Troop)
- 7. David Reesor 1859-1860
- 8. William Marr Button 1861-1863
- 9. John Bowman 1864-1865
- 10. William Marr Button 1866
- 11. John Bowman 1867
- 12. William Marr Button 1868-1873 - last unelected reeve of the village of Markham before 1873
- 13. James Robinson 1874-1878 - first elected reeve of the village
- 14. William Eakin 1879-1882
- 15. Thomas Williamson 1883
- 16. David James 1884-1886
- 17. Robert Bruce 1887-1888
- 18. Anthony Forster 1889-1892
- 19. Jonathan Slater 1893-1896
- 20. Walter Scott 1897-1898
- 21. James Laurie 1899
- 22. Arthur Quantz 1900
- 23. James Dimma 1901-1902
- 24. Abner Summerfeldt 1903-1904
- 25. Jonathan Slater 1905-1907
- 26. William Henry Lapp 1908–1909
- 27. Jonathan Nigh 1910-1916
- 28. George P. Padget 1917-1923
- 29. Wesley Gohn 1924-1932
- 30. George P. Padget 1933-1936
- 31. Orville Heisey 1938-1943
- 32. Charles H. Hooper 1944-1947
- 33. William W. Griffin 1948-1949
- 34. Winfred Timbers 1950-1953
- 35. Alfred DeMasurier 1954-1956
- 36. William L. Clark 1957-1960
- 37. Alma Walker 1961-1967 - last reeve of the Village of Markham and first female reeve of the village

After 1968, Markham Village became the Township of Markham with council now led by a mayor:

- 38. Alma Walker 1968-1970 - Mayor - first mayor and first female mayor

== Reeves of Markham Village 1872-1968 ==
- James Spleight 1872-1882
- Garnet R. Vanzant 1883-1884, 1888, 1890
- James Robinson 1885-1887
- William Hamilton Hall 1889, 1891-1892
- John Jerman 1893-1894
- Fred C. Ash 1895
- Dr Wesley Robinson 1896
- Thomas H. Spleight 1897, 1906-1910
- Fred Underhill 1898-1899
- R.C. Tefft 1900, 1911-1912
- Edward H. Wilson 1901
- Henry C. Marr 1902, 1904
- E.H. Wilson 1903, 1905
- Robert A. Fleming 1913-1919
- Dr T. H. Hassard 1920
- Fred Gowland 1921-1922
- Arthur Ferrier Wilson 1923-1925, 1930
- George W. Wilson 1926-1929
- Frank Nighswander 1932-1933
- Albert Wideman 1933-1937
- Orville B. Heisey 1938-1943 - Proprietor - Unionville Planing Mill
- Frank A. Burkholder 1944-1946
- Charles W. Reesor 1947-1949
- Edward Reeve 1950-1951
- Joseph V Fry 1952-1961
- Alma Walker 1962-1968

== Mayors of Markham Village 1969-1970 ==
- Alma Walker 1969-1970

== York Region Era (1971-) ==
Post war changes and the rapid urban growth of Toronto led to the shrinking of York County and gave rise to the establishment of the Regional Municipality of York (Regional Municipality of York Act RSO). Following the creation of York Region in 1971, the Town of Markham was incorporated by the larger Township of Markham Village, annexing the smaller villages of Unionville, Ontario and Thornhill, Ontario (portion east of Yonge Street) into the new local government. A new Town Council was created (replacing the councils of Markham Village, Unionville and Thornhill) and led by the following mayors:

- 39. Anthony Roman 1970-1984 - last Mayor of the Township and first Mayor of the Town of Markham
- 40. Carole Bell 1984-1988
- 41. Anthony Roman 1988-1992
- 42. Frank Scarpitti 1992-1994 - appointed following the death of Roman
- 43. Don Cousens 1994-2006
- 44. Frank Scarpitti 2006–present - last town mayor and first city mayor

== Deputy Mayors and Reeves ==
- David Reesor 1850
- Henry Miller 1851
- Alexander Hunter 1852
- John Reesor 1853-1854
- George Pringle 1856-1857
- William Trudgeon 1858
- Robert Marsh 1859, 1861
- William Button 1860
- Archibald Barker 1862
- John Bowman 1863
- James Gormley 1864-1865
- James Robinson 1866
- James Bowman 1867
- John Lane 1868-1875
- William Milliken 1876 - Postmaster - Milliken Postal Village
- Benjamin F. Reesor 1878-1881
- David James 1882-1883
- Robert Bruce 1884-1886
- Anthony Forster 1887-1888
- H.B. Schmidt 1889-1891
- Jonathan Slater 1892
- Walter Scott 1893-1896
- James Lawrie 1897
- Arthur Quantz 1898-1899
- James Dimma 1900
- John Eckardt 1901
- Abner Summerfeldt 1902, 1917
- George Morrison 1903-1905
- W.H. Lapp 1906–1907
- Jonathan Nigh 1908-1909
- George B. Padget 1910-1916
- John A. Mitchell 1918-1921
- Wesley V. Gohn 1922-1923
- Robert A. Smith 1924, 1931-1933
- John R. Campbell 1925-1927
- Reuben L. Stiver 1928-1930
- William L. Clark 1934, 1944-1945, 1954-1956
- James Rennie 1935-1936
- Charles H. Hooper 1937-1943, 1963
- Albert Reesor 1946
- Dalton Rummey 1947-1948, 1950-1951
- Winfred Timbers 1949
- Alfred E. James 1952
- Alfred LeMasurier 1953
- Donald M. Deacon 1957
- Wilfred R. Dean 1958-1960
- I. Lawson Mumberson 1961-1962
- Stewart T. Rumble 1964-1965
- S.J. Gadsby 1967-1968
- Anthony Roman 1969-1970
- Thomas Williamson - was a township councillor and later reeve
- Ron Dancey - later served as Councillor in Brant, Ontario
- Ronald Moran 1980s-1991 - served as Regional Councillor for Markham
- Frank Scarpitti 1991-1992
- Carole Bell 1994-1996
- Frank Scarpitti 1997–2006
- Jim Jones 2006-2007
- Jack Heath 2007–2018
- Don Hamilton 2018-present

== Notable reeves and mayors ==
Several reeves and mayors of Markham went on to serve in higher elected office after (and before) their terms in Markham:

- Reesor served as a legislative councillor in the Legislative Council of the Province of Canada and later in the Senate of Canada.
- Wright served as a MLA in the Legislative Assembly of the Province of Canada, MP in the House of Commons of Canada, as well as federal Indian Agent and Crown Agent of Ontario.
- Roman served as Chair of York Region Council and was an MP in the House of Commons of Canada before becoming mayor.
- Cousens served a provincial cabinet minister and MPP in the Legislative Assembly of Ontario before becoming mayor.
- Eakin served as Warden of York County, Ontario, later becoming a MLA and Speaker of the Legislative Assembly of the Northwest Territories.

== See also ==
- Home District Council for details on the Home District Council Chairman, who was the highest elected official for all of the District.
- Markham City Council
