= Alfred Stong =

Canadian politician

Alf Stong

Ontario MPP
- In office 1975–1981
- Preceded by: Donald Deacon
- Succeeded by: Don Cousens
- Constituency: York Centre

Personal details
- Born: August 2, 1940 (age 85) Richmond Hill, Ontario, Canada
- Party: Liberal
- Spouse: Raymonde Marie Aubrey
- Occupation: Judge, lawyer

Military service
- Allegiance: Canadian
- Rank: Lieutenant

Alfred Joseph "Alf" Stong (born August 2, 1940) is a former politician in Ontario, Canada. He was a Liberal member of the Legislative Assembly of Ontario from 1975 to 1981. He represented the riding of York Centre. After his time in government he was appointed as a judge to the Ontario Superior Court of Justice.

== Background ==
He was born in Richmond Hill, Ontario, the son of Alfred David Stong, and educated at the University of Toronto and Osgoode Hall. In 1965, he married Raymonde Marie Aubrey. Stong served as a lieutenant in the Canadian Forces.

== Politics ==
He ran in the 1975 provincial election as the Liberal candidate in the riding of York Centre. He defeated Progressive Conservative candidate Tony Roman by 1,379 votes. He was re-elected in 1977, but was defeated by PC candidate Don Cousens in 1981.

== Later life ==
Stong served as a judge in the Ontario Superior Court of Justice for the Central East Region until he retired in 2015.

In November 2010, Stong presided over the jury trial of Elaine Campione, a woman accused of the pre-meditated drowning of her two children. After the jury found Campione guilty of two counts of first-degree murder, Stong offered comments which attracted considerable media attention. Stong suggested Campione belonged to a class of "weaker and more vulnerable" citizens who as "victim/offenders" sometimes "act out of the expected norm", creating the impression that her crime was somewhat less heinous due to her own personal circumstances.
