= Frank Scarpitti =

Canadian politician

His Worship Frank Scarpitti
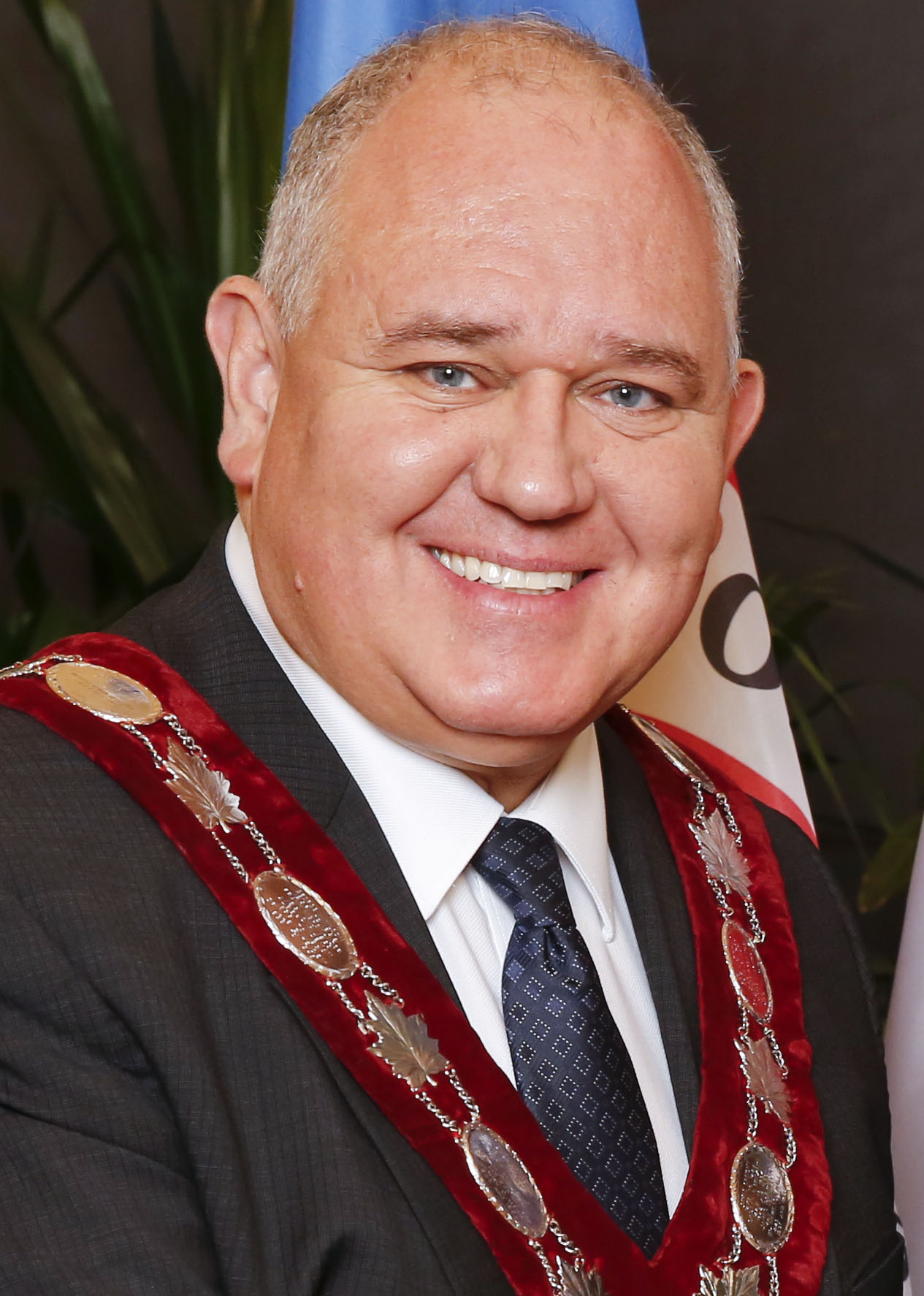
- Official portrait, 2014

7th Mayor of Markham
- Incumbent
- Assumed office November 2006
- Preceded by: Don Cousens

5th Mayor of Markham
- Interim
- In office 1992–1994
- Preceded by: Tony Roman
- Succeeded by: Don Cousens

Personal details
- Born: 1960 (age 65–66) Ontario, Canada
- Party: Independent (since 1985)
- Other political affiliations: Ontario Liberal (1990–1990)
- Spouse: Nancy Scarpitti
- Children: 3
- Occupation: Politician

Frank Scarpitti (born 1960) is a Canadian politician who has served as the 7th and current mayor of Markham since 2006.

== Early life ==
Scarpitti was born in Ontario in 1960. He is the son of Italian immigrants, Lucia and Antonio. He is married to Nancy Scarpitti, and has three children.

He ran for the Ontario Liberal Party in the 1990 Ontario provincial election in Markham, but lost.

== Political career and mayoralty ==
Scarpitti was appointed mayor from 1992 to 1994 following the death of Tony Roman but was defeated by Don Cousens in the 1994 municipal election. He subsequently worked as a broadcaster with CFMT in Toronto during his absence from politics from 1994 to 1997.

Scarpitti has served various roles in municipal politics as York Region Councillor (1985–1994), Budget Chief (2003–2006) and Deputy Mayor (1991–1992, 1997–2006). He was elected in 2006 as mayor to replace Don Cousens who had retired. He was re-elected in 2010 with 85% of the vote. He was re-elected again in 2014 with almost 71% of the vote.

In October 2019, Scarpitti gained negative attention for participating in a Chinese flag-raising ceremony in honour of the National Day of the People's Republic of China.

In November 2026, Mayor Scarpitti released a statement condemning antisemitism with other Italian Canadian business and community leaders, including Stephen Lecce, a Member of Provincial Parliament, Steven Del Duca, Mayor of Vaughan, and Steve Pellegrini, Mayor of King, referencing the Christie Pits riot of 1933.

== Electoral record ==
=== Provincial electoral record ===
1990 Ontario general election
Party	Candidate	Votes	%	±%
Progressive Conservative	Don Cousens	25,595	49.97	+5.77
Liberal	Frank Scarpitti	15,128	29.53	-13.10
New Democratic	Rob Saunders	8,459	16.51	+6.57
Family Coalition	Eric Skura	1,086	2.12	-1.11
Libertarian	Ian Hutchison	642	1.25	
Independent	Gary Walsh	311	0.61	
Total valid votes		51,221	100.0	
Progressive Conservative hold		Swing		+9.44

=== Municipal ===
==== 2006 Markham mayoral election ====
Mayoral candidate	Vote	%	±%
Frank Scarpitti	48,462	82.97	
Partap Dua	4,912	8.41	
Stephen Kotyck	3,195	5.47	
Sam Orrico	1,840	3.15	

==== 2010 Markham mayoral election ====
Mayoral candidate	Vote	%	±%
Frank Scarpitti	54,660	85.23	+2.26
Stephen Kotyck	5,566	8.68	+3.21
Partap Dua	3,909	6.09	-2.32

==== 2014 Markham mayoral election ====
Mayoral candidate	Vote	%	±%
Frank Scarpitti	50,065	70.97	-14.15
Stephen Kotyck	10,683	15.14	+6.41
Patrick Cottrell	3,621	5.13	N/A
Partap Dua	3,326	4.71	-1.43
James Treacy	2,850	4.04	N/A

==== 2018 Markham mayoral election ====
Mayoral candidate	Vote	%	±%
Frank Scarpitti	55,553	74.94	
Steven Chen	11,068	14.93	
Abdul Rahman Malik	3,379	4.56	
Jawed Syed	2,294	3.09	
Shan Hua Lu	1,835	2.48	

==== 2022 Markham mayoral election ====
Mayoral candidate	Vote	%	±%
Frank Scarpitti	44,172	64.35	
Don Hamilton	24,469	35.65	

== See also ==
- List of mayors of Markham, Ontario
