= Thomas Graham (Canadian politician) =

Canadian politician

Thomas Graham (1914 – April 21, 1988) was a Canadian politician.

== Biography ==
Graham worked as a provincial court judge in Toronto and had previously served as a Toronto police officer, municipal councillor, and a member of the Legislative Assembly of Ontario (1955–1959). He served as a member of the Ontario Police Commission from 1960 until 1980, the last two years as the commission's chairman.

Graham was born in Toronto in 1914, where he attended Vaughan Road Collegiate Institute and St. Michael's College School. After working briefly as a milkman, he joined the Toronto Police Service in 1937, in the traffic division. He took a leave of absence during World War II to serve in the Royal Canadian Air Force from 1941 to 1944. After returning to the police force, he resigned in 1947 in order to manage a hardware store and engineering supply firm.

In 1953, he was elected to North York municipal council and served as a deputy reeve until 1955 when he was elected to the Ontario legislature as the Progressive Conservative Party of Ontario MPP for York Centre. In the 1959 general election, he was defeated by Liberal Party of Ontario candidate Vernon Singer.

He was appointed to the three-person Ontario Police Commission in 1960, and in 1964, Graham was made a magistrate (later a provincial court judge) after Judge Herbert Sparling retired in order to fulfill the commission's requirement that at least one of its members be a judge. He was one of the last two non-lawyers to be appointed to the provincial court. After retiring from the Ontario Police Commission in 1980, he was active as a provincial court judge at the Old City Hall (Toronto) law courts.
