= Billy Pang =

Canadian politician

Billy Pang MPP
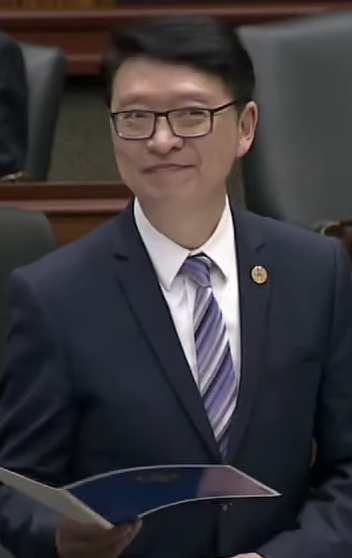
- Pang in 2019

Parliamentary Assistant to the Minister of Tourism, Culture and Sport (Tourism)
- Incumbent
- Assumed office June 26, 2019
- Minister: Lisa MacLeod; Neil Lumsden

Member of the Ontario Provincial Parliament for Markham—Unionville
- Incumbent
- Assumed office June 7, 2018
- Preceded by: Michael Chan

Personal details
- Born: August 31 British Hong Kong
- Party: Progressive Conservative Party of Ontario

Billy Pang MPP is a Hong Kong Canadian politician, who was elected to the Legislative Assembly of Ontario in the 2018 provincial election. He represents the riding of Markham—Unionville as a member of the Progressive Conservative Party of Ontario.

In 2014, Pang was elected as a Trustee for the York Region District School Board.

== Electoral record ==
2025 Ontario general election: Markham—Unionville
Party	Candidate	Votes	%	±%
Progressive Conservative	Billy Pang	20,113	61.16	+4.74
Liberal	Jagbir Dosanjh	10,158	30.89	+0.47
New Democratic	Sameer Qureshi	1,298	3.95	–3.33
Green	Chris Madsen	772	2.35	–1.32
New Blue	Nick Boudreau	545	1.66	+0.14
Total valid votes		32,886	99.45	
Total rejected, unmarked and declined ballots		183	0.55	–0.05
Turnout		33,069	35.88	–3.25
Eligible voters		92,176		
Progressive Conservative hold		Swing		▲2.13
Source: Elections Ontario

2022 Ontario general election: Markham—Unionville
Party	Candidate	Votes	%	±%
Progressive Conservative	Billy Pang	19,985	56.42	–6.01
Liberal	Emily Li	10,774	30.42	+12.40
New Democratic	Senthil Mahalingam	2,579	7.28	–9.29
Green	Shanta Sundarason	1,299	3.67	+1.55
New Blue	Trina Kollis	536	1.51	–
Ontario Party	Naz Obredor	249	0.70	–
Total valid votes		35,422	99.39	
Total rejected, unmarked and declined ballots		216	0.61	–0.46
Turnout		35,638	39.12	–15.62
Eligible voters		91,097		
Progressive Conservative hold		Swing		▼9.21
Source: Elections Ontario

2018 Ontario general election: Markham—Unionville
Party	Candidate	Votes	%	±%
Progressive Conservative	Billy Pang	29,305	62.43	+21.62
Liberal	Amanda Yeung Collucci	8,456	18.01	–25.87
New Democratic	Sylvie David	7,778	16.57	+6.63
Green	Deborah Moolman	996	2.12	–1.68
Libertarian	Allen Small	244	0.52	–1.06
Moderate	Anastasia Afonina	161	0.34	–
Total valid votes		46,940	98.94	
Total rejected, unmarked and declined ballots		505	1.06	
Turnout		47,445	54.74	
Eligible voters		86,671		
Progressive Conservative notional gain from Liberal		Swing		+23.75
Source: Elections Ontario
