= York Region Police Services Board =

Canadian police oversight organisation

The York Regional Police Services Board is the civilian oversight of the York Regional Police in York Region of Ontario, Canada.

The board consists of a chair, regional appointees, and provincial appointees. Regional members are appointed by resolution of York Regional Council, and provincial appointees are members of the public from York Region appointed by the Lieutenant Governor in Council. All members must be residents of York Region.

== Current board ==
- Danny Wheeler - Chair and York Regional Councillor - Georgina
- Joe Persechini - Vice-Chair and provincial appointee - Newmarket
- Bill Fisch - York Region Chair and regional appointee - Markham
- Frank Scarpitti - Mayor of Markham and Regional appointee - Markham
- Barbara Bartlett - Regional appointee - Newmarket
- Sam Herzog - provincial appointee - Vaughan
- Joanna Yu - provincial appointee

== Former members ==
- Tony Wong
- Margaret Black - former Chair
- Dave Barrow - former Chair
- Barbara Munro
- Asad M. Malik
- Daisy Wai
