= David Tsubouchi =

Canadian politician (born 1951)

The Honourable David Tsubouchi ECO

Ontario MPP
- In office 1995–2003
- Preceded by: Don Cousens
- Succeeded by: Tony Wong
- Constituency: Markham

Personal details
- Born: August 20, 1951 (age 75) Toronto, Ontario, Canada
- Party: Progressive Conservative
- Occupation: Lawyer
- Awards: Knight of the Order of Saint Joachim

David Hiroshi Tsubouchi (坪内, Tsubouchi) (born August 20, 1951) is a former politician in Ontario, Canada. He was a Progressive Conservative member of the Legislative Assembly of Ontario from 1995 to 2003, and was a cabinet minister in the governments of Mike Harris and Ernie Eves. He was the first Japanese Canadian elected to a provincial legislature.

== Background ==
Tsubouchi was born in Toronto, and grew up in Scarborough in the Agincourt area. His parents were Japanese Canadians, originally from British Columbia, who were interned during World War II. After their release they moved to Toronto. He graduated from Agincourt Collegiate Institute in 1968 and attended York University where he received a Bachelor of Arts degree in 1972, and a law degree from Osgoode Hall Law School in 1975. He was the senior partner in the firm of Tsubouchi & Nichols (formerly Tsubouchi & Parker) following his graduation. Tsubouchi was also an Associate Director of the Japanese Canadian Cultural Centre, and was a frequent contributor to the Law Gazette. He received an Air Canada Heart of Gold award in 1988, and was granted a coat-of-arms from the Canadian Governor-General's office in 1993. Tsubouchi has a younger brother and sister. His father was killed in a hit and run accident in 2005.

Tsubouchi worked briefly as an actor. He had a minor role as a Japanese salesman in David Cronenberg's Videodrome in 1983, and episodes of John Byner's Bizarre and SCTV.

== Politics ==
=== Municipal councillor ===
Tsubouchi was elected as a city councillor in ward 5 in Markham and served from 1988 to 1994.

=== Provincial politics ===
In the provincial election of 1995, he ran as the Progressive Conservative candidate in the provincial riding of Markham, defeating his nearest opponent by 26,544 votes. The Tories won a majority government in the election and Tsubouchi was appointed as Minister of Community and Social Services in the government of Mike Harris on June 26, 1995.

In this portfolio, Tsubouchi was responsible for presiding over drastic cuts in the province's welfare system. He also made a number of controversial actions early in his ministry, including suggesting that welfare recipients who had their funding reduced should consider haggling down the price of dented cans of tuna to 69 cents each. He also claimed that single mothers on welfare had ample time to find jobs, after having given a three-month warning for a 22% cut in benefits.

Later, he prepared a sample menu which listed affordable food purchases for those whose welfare rates had been reduced. His list was found to have less nutritional value than the diet served to prisoners in Ontario jails. There were several calls for his resignation in the wake of these comments; even the right-leaning Toronto Sun newspaper suggested that he should be removed. He remained with the portfolio until August 16, 1996, when he was named Minister of Consumer and Commercial Relations.

Notwithstanding his handling of the Social Services portfolio, Tsubouchi was regarded in some circles as one of the more progressively-minded ministers in the Harris government. He supported the centre-right Progressive Conservative Party of Canada rather than the right-wing Reform Party at the federal level, and in 2000 was the only member of the Progressive Conservative caucus to openly support Joe Clark for the federal party's leadership. He was also credited by some for at least making an effort to cushion the blow of his government's welfare cuts. Nonetheless, the legacy of his department's cutbacks would follow Tsubouchi for the rest of his career, and make him a frequent target of social activists opposed to the Harris government.

Tsubouchi's tenure as Consumer and Commercial Relations Minister was comparatively uneventful. He was easily re-elected in the provincial election of 1999, defeating Liberal Steven Kirsch by just over 13,000 votes.

On June 17, 1999, he was appointed as the province's Solicitor-General. He held this position until a cabinet shuffle on February 8, 2001, when he was named Chair of the Management Board of Cabinet.

Tsubouchi supported Ernie Eves's successful bid to replace Mike Harris as party leader in 2002. Eves retained him as chair of the Management Board, and also named him as Ontario's Minister of Culture on April 15, 2002.

In the provincial election of 2003, Tsubouchi was upset by Liberal candidate Tony Wong, losing by about 6,000 votes. In 2004, he supported John Tory's successful bid to replace Eves as party leader.

=== Cabinet positions ===
Eves ministry, Province of Ontario (2002–2003)
Cabinet post (1)
Predecessor	Office	Successor
Tim Hudak	Minister of Culture; 2002–2003	Madeleine Meilleur
Harris ministry, Province of Ontario (1995–2002)
Cabinet posts (4)
Predecessor	Office	Successor
Chris Hodgson	Management Board Chair; 2001–2003	Gerry Phillips
Bob Runciman	Solicitor General; 1999–2001	David Turnbull
Norm Sterling	Minister of Consumer and Commercial Relations; 1996–1999	Bob Runciman
Tony Silipo	Minister of Community and Social Services; 1995–1996	Janet Ecker

== After politics ==
He worked as associate counsel at the law firm Miller Thomson LLP, and is currently the founder and chairman of Deduce International Markets Inc. In 2007, he was invested as a Knight in The Equestrian, Secular and Chapterial Order of Saint Joachim in Toronto.

In recent years, Tsubouchi has worked as a partner at the law firm Fogler, Rubinoff LLP. On June 1, 2013 he published Gambatte: Generations Of Perseverance And Politics, A Memoir, a memoir of his career. He has been appointed to head Ontario College of Trades starting on September 9, 2013.
