= Vernon Singer =

Canadian politician

Vern Singer

Ontario MPP
- In office 1975–1977
- Preceded by: Riding established
- Succeeded by: David Rotenberg
- Constituency: Wilson Heights
- In office 1963–1975
- Preceded by: Riding established
- Succeeded by: Odoardo Di Santo
- Constituency: Downsview
- In office 1959–1963
- Preceded by: Thomas Graham
- Succeeded by: Riding abolished
- Constituency: York Centre

8th Reeve of North York
- In office 1957–1958
- Preceded by: Frederick Joseph McMahon
- Succeeded by: Norman C. Goodhead

Personal details
- Born: Vernon Milton Singer; March 26, 1919 Toronto, Ontario, Canada
- Died: September 20, 2003 (aged 84)
- Party: Ontario Liberal
- Spouse: Elaine
- Children: 3
- Occupation: Lawyer

Vernon Milton Singer (March 26, 1919 – September 20, 2003) was a Canadian politician in Ontario, Canada. He was a Liberal member of the Legislative Assembly of Ontario from 1959 to 1977 who represented the North York ridings of York Centre, Downsview and Wilson Heights.

== Background ==
Singer was born in Toronto, Ontario, the son of lawyer and politician Joseph Singer who was the first Jewish-Canadian to be elected to the Toronto Board of Control. After serving in World War II with the Royal Canadian Dragoons, Singer returned to Canada and became president of the Young Liberals in 1947. He worked for a while as a lawyer before entering politics. He and his wife Elaine had three children.

== Politics ==
He became a councillor in North York, Ontario eventually becoming reeve from 1957 to 1958. He ran for the leadership of the Ontario Liberal Party at the 1958 Ontario Liberal leadership convention, placing fourth.

He was elected to the Legislative Assembly of Ontario in the 1959 provincial election. Singer became deputy leader of the Ontario Liberal Party and, as a Member of Provincial Parliament (MPP), pushed for reforms to municipal law, automobile insurance and electoral laws as well as for the establishment of a provincial ombudsman.

He served as Liberal House Leader in the 1970s and, in 1973, sued fellow Liberal MPP Eddie Sargent for libel after Sargent made remarks about Singer's retainer fee from a developer while he was appearing before a legislative committee to explain how he obtained the contract to build Ontario Hydro's new headquarters in Toronto. Singer was deputy leader of the Liberals from 1966 until 1973, when he was asked to step down by leader Robert Nixon, after he filed the lawsuit but was allowed to remain in the shadow cabinet.

Singer was re-elected to the legislature on four successive occasions before retiring in 1977. His retirement was controversial as he announced it on the eve of that year's election campaign without giving his Liberal colleagues advance notice. The Progressive Conservatives won Singer's previously safe seat in the election and, the next year, the government appointed Singer to the first of five two-year terms on the Ontario Municipal Board including several years as its chairman. The incident resulted in accusations by NDP MPP Ed Ziemba that the government had bought Singer's seat, and that of fellow Liberal Philip Givens who left in similar circumstances, through political patronage.

== Later life ==
Following his retirement from the Ontario Municipal Board in 1989, Singer won election to North York's committee of adjustment filling a seat vacated by Patti Starr when she was forced to resign as the result of a wider political scandal.
