= Markham (provincial electoral district) =

Former provincial electoral district in Ontario, Canada

Ontario electoral district

Defunct provincial electoral district
- Legislature: Legislative Assembly of Ontario
- District created: 1987
- District abolished: 2007
- First contested: 1987
- Last contested: 2007

Markham was a provincial electoral district in Ontario, Canada, created in 1986.

Tony Wong resigned in the fall of 2006 to successfully seek election to York Regional Council. His provincial seat was filled in a by-election on February 8, 2007. However the riding was abolished at the October 4, 2007 provincial election, and redistributed between the new provincial ridings of Markham—Unionville and Oak Ridges—Markham as its federal counterpart already has been.

== Members of Provincial Parliament ==
Markham
Assembly	Years	Member	Party
Riding created from York Centre and York North
34th	1987–1990	Don Cousens	Progressive Conservative
35th	1990–1995	Don Cousens	Progressive Conservative
36th	1995–1999	David Tsubouchi	Progressive Conservative
37th	1999–2003	David Tsubouchi	Progressive Conservative
38th	2003–2007	Tony C. Wong	Liberal
38th	2007–2007	Michael Chan	Liberal
Riding dissolved into Markham—Unionville and Oak Ridges—Markham

== Election results ==
Ontario provincial by-election, February 8, 2007 Resignation of Tony Wong
Party	Candidate	Votes	%	±%
Liberal	Michael Chan	9,080	49.30	–2.40
Progressive Conservative	Alex Yuan	6,426	34.89	–5.44
New Democratic	Janice Hagan	1,492	8.10	+3.02
Green	Bernadette Manning	999	5.42	+3.86
Freedom	Cathy Mckeever	159	0.86	–
Family Coalition	Patrick Redmond	135	0.73	–0.59
Libertarian	Jay Miller	127	0.69	–
Total valid votes		18,418	99.44	
Total rejected, unmarked and declined ballots		104	0.56	+0.06
Turnout		18,522	16.70	–37.19
Eligible voters		110,902		
Liberal hold		Swing		+1.52
Source: Elections Ontario

2003 Ontario general election
Party	Candidate	Votes	%	±%
Liberal	Tony Wong	27,253	51.70	+21.10
Progressive Conservative	David Tsubouchi	21,257	40.33	–21.76
New Democratic	Janice Hagan	2,679	5.08	+1.29
Green	Bernadette Manning	824	1.56	+0.52
Family Coalition	Patrick Redmond	697	1.32	+0.37
Total valid votes		52,710	99.49	
Total rejected, unmarked and declined ballots		268	0.51	–0.40
Turnout		52,978	53.89	–1.44
Eligible voters		98,306		
Liberal gain from Progressive Conservative		Swing		+21.43
Source: Elections Ontario

1999 Ontario general election
Party	Candidate	Votes	%	±%
Progressive Conservative	David Tsubouchi	26,083	62.08	–2.72
Liberal	Steven Kirsch	12,859	30.61	+11.90
New Democratic	Janice Hagan	1,594	3.79	–9.72
Natural Law	Mike Dubinsky	640	1.52	+0.44
Green	Bernadette Manning	437	1.04	–
Family Coalition	Patrick Redmond	399	0.95	–0.94
Total valid votes		42,012	99.10	
Total rejected, unmarked and declined ballots		383	0.90	–0.03
Turnout		42,395	55.33	–7.46
Eligible voters		76,619		
Progressive Conservative hold		Swing		–7.31
Source: Elections Ontario

1995 Ontario general election
Party	Candidate	Votes	%	±%
Progressive Conservative	David Tsubouchi	37,314	64.81	+14.84
Liberal	Khalid Usman	10,770	18.71	–10.83
New Democratic	Mike Tang	7,779	13.51	–3.00
Family Coalition	Patrick Redmond	1,088	1.89	–0.23
Natural Law	Stephen R. Porter	626	1.09	–
Total valid votes		57,577	99.06	
Total rejected, unmarked and declined ballots		544	0.94	–0.54
Turnout		58,121	62.80	–1.60
Eligible voters		92,554		
Progressive Conservative hold		Swing		+12.83
Source: Elections Ontario

1990 Ontario general election
Party	Candidate	Votes	%	±%
Progressive Conservative	Don Cousens	25,595	49.97	+5.77
Liberal	Frank Scarpitti	15,128	29.53	–13.10
New Democratic	Rob Saunders	8,459	16.51	+6.58
Family Coalition	Eric Skura	1,086	2.12	–1.11
Libertarian	Ian Hutchison	642	1.25	–
Independent	Gary Robert Walsh	311	0.61	–
Total valid votes		51,221	98.53	
Total rejected, unmarked and declined ballots		765	1.47	+1.15
Turnout		51,986	64.39	+3.84
Eligible voters		80,732		
Progressive Conservative hold		Swing		+9.43
Source: Elections Ontario

1987 Ontario general election
Party	Candidate	Votes	%
Progressive Conservative	Don Cousens	19,224	44.20
Liberal	Gail Newall	18,543	42.63
New Democratic	Anne Swarbrick	4,323	9.94
Family Coalition	Rina Mary Puleo	1,403	3.23
Total valid votes		43,493	99.68
Total rejected ballots		139	0.32
Turnout		43,632	60.56
Eligible voters		72,053	
Progressive Conservative pickup new district.			
Source: Elections Ontario

== See also ==
- List of Ontario provincial electoral districts
- Canadian provincial electoral districts
