= Tony Wong (politician) =

Canadian politician

Ontario MPP
- In office October 2, 2003 – September 25, 2006
- Preceded by: David Tsubouchi
- Succeeded by: Michael Chan
- Constituency: Markham

Personal details
- Born: Wong Chih Wah; December 12, 1948 British Hong Kong
- Died: June 17, 2009 (aged 61) Toronto, Ontario, Canada
- Party: Liberal
- Spouse: Ellee
- Children: 1
- Relatives: Cynthia Lai (cousin)
- Occupation: Lawyer

Tony Wong (born Wong Chi-wah; (Note: Chinese: 黃志華; pinyin: Huáng Zhìhuá; Cantonese Yale: Wòhng Ji-wàah.) December 12, 1948 – June 17, 2009) was a Hong Kong Canadian politician in Ontario, Canada. He was a Liberal member of the Legislative Assembly of Ontario from 2003 to 2006, representing the Greater Toronto Area riding of Markham. He was a municipal councillor for the city of Markham from 1997 to 2004 and served as a York Region Councillor from 2000 to 2003 and from 2006 to 2009.

== Background ==
Wong was born in Hong Kong, and he studied at the Diocesan Boys' School. He received a Bachelor's degree in math from the University of Toronto and Master's in computer science from the University of Missouri. He was a lawyer (University of Toronto) and founding director of the Metropolitan Toronto Southeast Asian Legal Clinic. He was a partner in his own practice, Wong and Chun. He served as a board member of the Markham Stouffville Hospital Foundation, the St. John's Rehabilitation Hospital Foundation and the York Region Police Services Board. He is a cousin of Toronto City Councillor Cynthia Lai.

== Politics ==
In 1997, Wong ran for the municipal council representing Ward 7 in Markham, Ontario. He received 1,406 votes defeating his nearest rival by 774 votes. He was a leading figure in calling for reconciliation between the city's Chinese and Muslim communities in 1999, after a controversy concerning the construction of a local mosque. In the 2000 election, he was elected as one of four regional councillors, with a term ending November 30, 2003. In 2003, he spoke against an attempt by the government of China to enact "anti-subversion" legislation in Hong Kong (many recent Chinese immigrants in Markham have dual Canadian/Hong Kong citizenship).

In the 2003 provincial election, he contested Markham for the Liberal Party against David Tsubouchi, a prominent cabinet minister in the Progressive Conservative governments of Mike Harris and Ernie Eves. Markham had been represented by the Progressive Conservative Party since its creation in 1987, and it was anticipated that Tsubouchi would be re-elected despite a strong provincial swing to the Liberals; instead, Wong defeated him by 5,996 votes. Wong acknowledged that his candidacy benefited from a large ethnic Chinese immigrant population in the riding.

The Liberals won the provincial election, and Wong was subsequently named Parliamentary Assistant to Joseph Cordiano, the Minister of Economic Development and Trade (October 23, 2003 – June 30, 2005). Later in his term, he was appointed Parliamentary Assistant to the Minister of Research and Innovation (June 30, 2005 – September 20, 2006) and to the Minister of Finance (September 20, 2006 – September 25, 2006).

Not long after his election, Wong held a benefit dinner for the daughters of Geng Chaohui, a recent Chinese immigrant to Canada who committed suicide because of underemployment. The event raised $30,000, although it was little reported outside of the Chinese-language press.

On September 25, 2006, Wong resigned his seat in the legislature to run for York Regional Council. He won one of four seats in November 2006. He served in council until March 2009 and took a leave of absence. Wong was expected to return to council in September.

Wong died of liver failure on June 17, 2009, at Sunnybrook Health Sciences Centre in Toronto.
