= Michael Chan (politician) =

Canadian politician (born c. 1951)

The Honourable Michael Chan ECO
- 陳國治
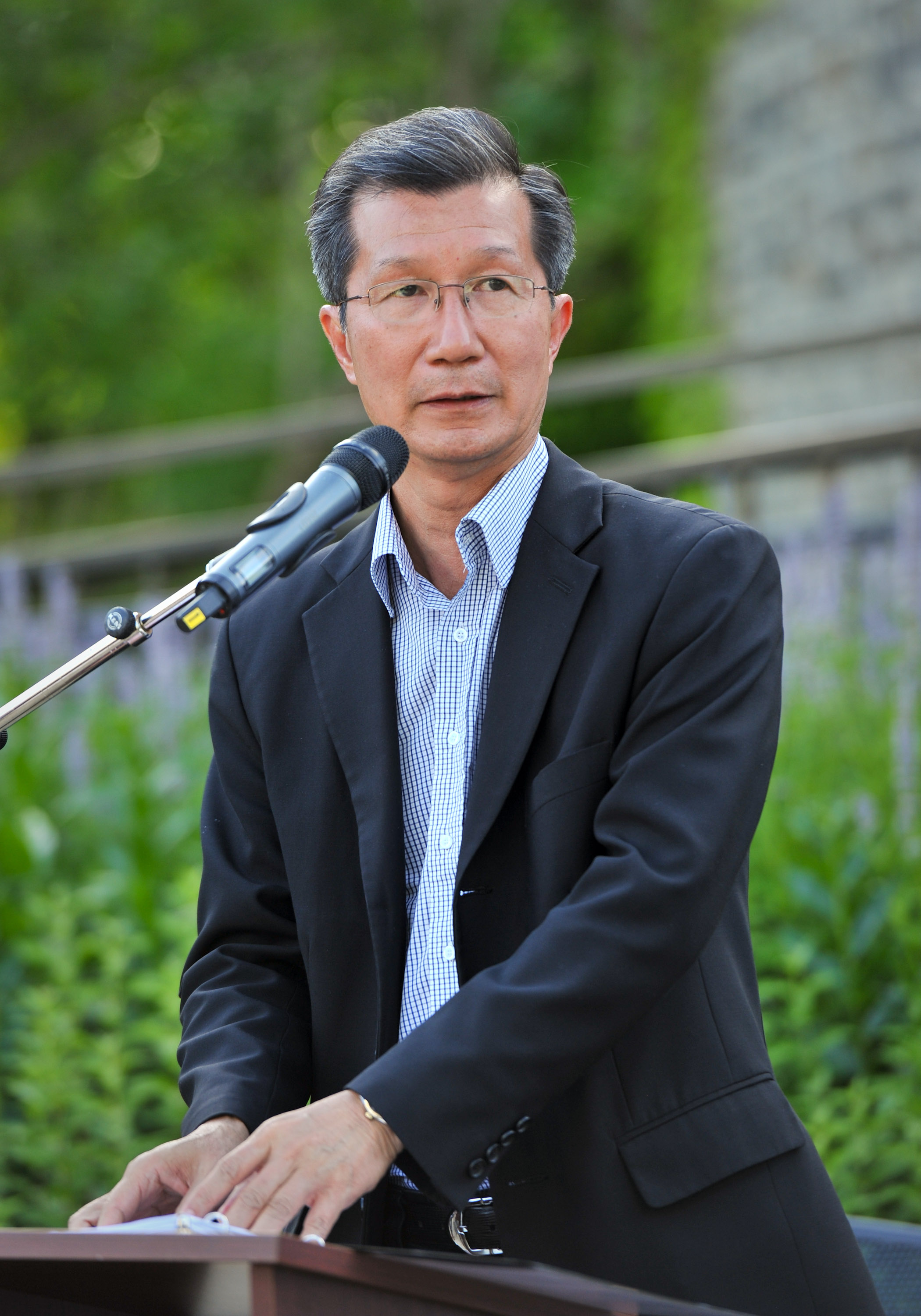
- Chan at the Canadian Film Centre's 2013 Garden Party

Deputy Mayor of Markham
- Incumbent
- Assumed office 2022
- Preceded by: Don Hamilton

York Regional Councilor for Markham
- Incumbent
- Assumed office 2022

Member of the Ontario Provincial Parliament for Markham-Unionville Markham (2007)
- In office February 8, 2007 – June 7, 2018
- Preceded by: Tony Wong
- Succeeded by: Billy Pang

Personal details
- Born: 1951 (age 74–75) Guangzhou, China
- Party: Liberal
- Occupation: Insurance broker

Kwok Chi (Michael) Chan (traditional Chinese: 陳國治; simplified Chinese: 陈国治; Jyutping: can4 gwok3 zi6; pinyin: Chén Guózhì) (born c. 1951) is a Hong Kong Canadian politician in Ontario, Canada. He was a Liberal member of the Legislative Assembly of Ontario from 2007 until 2018. He represented the riding of Markham-Unionville. Chan served as a Cabinet Minister, during his entire tenure in politics in the governments of Dalton McGuinty and Kathleen Wynne. Michael Chan presently serves as the Deputy Mayor of Markham. Chan has also served as a Senior Business Advisor for the law firm Miller Thomson LLP in Vaughan and as a member of the board of governors at Seneca College.

== Background ==
Chan was born in Guangzhou, and his father was an official in the Kuomintang. As the Chinese Communist Party took power in China, Chan's family went to Macau, before moving to Hong Kong and eventually migrating to Canada in 1969, when he was 18. Chan has lived in Markham since 1995 where he owned an insurance business before entering politics.

Before entering politics he was president of the federal Liberal Party of Canada riding association for the Markham—Unionville constituency held by MP John McCallum. According to an endorsement on Chan's website, John McCallum and Chan are close friends.

== Political career ==
Chan was elected in a February 8, 2007 by-election, necessitated by the resignation of former Liberal MPP Tony Wong, who left his seat in the Legislative Assembly of Ontario to successfully run for York Regional Council in 2006. He was re-elected in 2007, 2011, and 2014.

In February, 2007 he was appointed to cabinet as Minister of Revenue. In October 2007, after the election he was moved to Minister of Citizenship and Immigration. In 2010 he was moved again to Minister of Tourism, Culture. A year later the mandate of the ministry was changed slightly to include Sport issues. In November 2012 he assumed the roles Citizenship and Immigration and responsibility for the Pan/Parapan American Games from Charles Sousa when Sousa announced he was running for the leadership of the Liberal Party.

In February 2013, when Kathleen Wynne took over as the new premier, she confirmed Chan in his roles as Minister of Tourism, Culture and Sport and Minister Responsible for the 2015 Pan/Parapan American Games. In June 2014, Wynne appointed Chan as the Minister of Citizenship, Immigration and International Trade. Chan was instrumental in fundraising for the Liberals, as well as being active in the recruitment of Chinese Canadians to campaign for seats at both the federal and provincial levels.

Chan announced his retirement from provincial politics in April 2018, a few months before the next Ontario election. During the 2019–20 Hong Kong protests, Chan publicly condemned the pro-democracy protesters and supported the Hong Kong Police Force's response, while attributing the protests to alleged manipulation by foreign actors. In 2019, Chan served as the re-election campaign co-chair for Mary Ng.

In August 2022, Chan registered as a York Region council candidate. He was elected to York Regional council in the 2022 municipal elections, and became deputy mayor of Markham.

=== Alleged involvement in Chinese government interference ===
In 2010, the Canadian Security Intelligence Service allegedly became concerned that Chan had become too close to the Chinese consulate in Toronto, prompting a senior federal official to caution the provincial government about his alleged conduct. Former Ontario premier Dalton McGuinty and his successor, Kathleen Wynne, both dismissed the allegations against Chan.

In 2015, Chan sued The Globe and Mail for a report that claimed he was the subject an investigation by the Canadian Security Intelligence Service (CSIS) for ties to officials in Beijing and susceptibility to influence by the Chinese government. Chan responded that his engagement with the Chinese government was an appropriate aspect of his role as the Minister of Immigration and International Trade in Ontario. Former Ontario premier Kathleen Wynne also rejected the accusations against him. Toronto lawyer Ping Tam suggested that Chan was being targeted because he was encouraging young Chinese-Canadians to engage in politics and had supported a failed 2013 agreement between the Toronto District School Board to install Confucius Institutes in local schools. Chan also threatened Alberta premier Jason Kenney with a lawsuit over criticism of Chan's support for Beijing. In August 2024, the Ontario Superior Court of Justice dismissed Chan's lawsuit against The Globe and Mail after Chan's failure to file court documents on time.

On February 24, 2023, Global News reported that its intelligence sources in CSIS had said that Chan had arranged the ouster of Liberal MP Geng Tan in Don Valley North in favour of Han Dong in advance of the 2019 federal election because China was unhappy with what Tan was doing. Sources claim Justin Trudeau and senior Liberal Party officials ignored CSIS warnings about Chan and Dong. Chan, Dong, and the Chinese embassy denied the accusations, with Chan describing the leaks as "outrageous" and possibly contrary to the Security of Information Act. In May 2023, The Globe and Mail reported that CSIS electronically monitored Chan in the run-up to the 2021 Canadian federal election.

It has been alleged by anonymous officials that the Trudeau government may have downplayed warnings about Chan because of fundraising ties to senior party officials. According to one anonymous Greater Toronto Area Liberal party politician, "Michael Chan is involved centrally in decision-making, and the party consults with him and his team... [t]hey are kingmakers of the party, standing behind the scenes and moving their pawns. So if they can produce the money, the party is putty in their hands.”

In December 2023, Chinese dissident and Uyghur rights groups questioned their safety to testify at a planned public inquiry on foreign interference with Chan present.

=== Cabinet posts ===
Wynne ministry, Province of Ontario (2013–2018)
Cabinet posts (2)
Predecessor	Office	Successor
New position	Minister of International Trade; 2016-2018	Jim Wilson
Michael Coteau	Minister of Citizenship, Immigration and International Trade; 2014–2016	Laura Albanese
McGuinty ministry, Province of Ontario (2003–2013)
Cabinet posts (4)
Predecessor	Office	Successor
Charles Sousa	Minister of Citizenship and Immigration; 2012–2013; Also Responsible for the 2015 Pan and Parapan American Games (to June 2014)	Michael Coteau
Monique Smith & Aileen Carroll	Minister of Tourism, Culture and Sport; 2010–2014; Minister of Tourism and Culture before 2011	Michael Coteau
Gerry Phillips	Minister of Citizenship and Immigration; 2007–2010	Eric Hoskins
Shelley Wark-Martyn	Minister of Revenue; 2007	Monique Smith

=== Electoral record ===
Ontario provincial by-election, February 8, 2007: Markham Resignation of Tony Wong
Party	Candidate	Votes	%	±%
Liberal	Michael Chan	9,080	49.30	–2.40
Progressive Conservative	Alex Yuan	6,426	34.89	–5.44
New Democratic	Janice Hagan	1,492	8.10	+3.02
Green	Bernadette Manning	999	5.42	+3.86
Freedom	Cathy Mckeever	159	0.86	–
Family Coalition	Patrick Redmond	135	0.73	–0.59
Libertarian	Jay Miller	127	0.69	–
Total valid votes		18,418	99.44	
Total rejected, unmarked and declined ballots		104	0.56	+0.06
Turnout		18,522	16.70	–37.19
Eligible voters		110,902		
Liberal hold		Swing		+1.52
Source: Elections Ontario

2007 Ontario general election: Markham—Unionville
Party	Candidate	Votes	%
Liberal	Michael Chan	21,149	59.47
Progressive Conservative	Ki Kit Li	9,574	26.92
New Democratic	Andy Arifin	2,597	7.30
Green	Bernadette Manning	1,910	5.37
Family Coalition	Leon Williams	335	0.94
Total valid votes		35,565	98.99
Total rejected, unmarked and declined ballots		362	1.01
Turnout		35,927	40.51
Eligible voters		88,688	
Liberal pickup new district.			
Source: Elections Ontario

2011 Ontario general election: Markham—Unionville
Party	Candidate	Votes	%	±%
Liberal	Michael Chan	19,579	52.58	–6.89
Progressive Conservative	Shan Thayaparan	11,720	31.47	+4.55
New Democratic	P. C. Choo	4,575	12.29	+4.98
Green	Myles O'Brien	1,104	2.96	–2.41
Libertarian	Allen Small	259	0.70	–
Total valid votes		37,237	99.24	
Total rejected, unmarked and declined ballots		284	0.76	–0.25
Turnout		37,521	40.68	+0.17
Eligible voters		92,232		
Liberal hold		Swing		–5.72
Source: Elections Ontario

2014 Ontario general election
Party	Candidate	Votes	%	±%
Liberal	Michael Chan	21,517	51.33	-1.25
Progressive Conservative	Shan Thayaparan	14,241	33.98	+2.51
New Democratic	Nadine Kormos Hawkins	4,205	10.03	-2.26
Green	Myles O'Brien	1,509	3.60	+0.64
Libertarian	Allen Small	444	1.06	+0.36
Total valid votes		41,916	100.0	
Liberal hold		Swing		-1.88
Source: Elections Ontario
