= Don Cousens =

Canadian politician

6th Mayor of Markham, Ontario
- In office 1994–2006
- Preceded by: Frank Scarpitti
- Succeeded by: Frank Scarpitti

Ontario MPP
- In office 1987–1994
- Preceded by: New riding
- Succeeded by: David Tsubouchi
- Constituency: Markham
- In office 1981–1987
- Preceded by: Alfred Stong
- Succeeded by: Greg Sorbara
- Constituency: York Centre

Personal details
- Born: July 20, 1938 Vankleek Hill, Ontario
- Died: February 23, 2017 (aged 78) Markham, Ontario
- Party: Progressive Conservative
- Spouse: Aline A. Cousens (d. 2016)
- Occupation: Minister

W. Donald Cousens (20 July 1938 – 23 February 2017) was a politician in Ontario, Canada. He was a Progressive Conservative member of the Legislative Assembly of Ontario from 1981 to 1994, and briefly served as a cabinet minister in the government of Frank Miller. From 1994 to 2006, Cousens was the Mayor of Markham, Ontario.

== Background ==
Cousens was educated at Queen's University and Knox College at the University of Toronto. An ordained Presbyterian Minister (he served 1966 to 1968 in Penetanguishene, Ontario) and interim minister at St. Andrews Presbyterian, Markham. He was also an officer in the Canadian Forces (Commandant in the Fort Henry Guard), he then served as an executive from 1967 to 1992 (firstly with Honeywell Ltd.) before entering political life, and later became a chair of the York Technology Association.

From 1965 to 1967 he was a trustee for Penetanguishene. He was a member of the then York Region Board of Education from 1972 to 1979, eventually serving as chair in 1979. Cousens died in hospital on Thursday February 23, 2017 at aged 78.

== Provincial politics ==
Cousens was elected to the Ontario legislature in the 1981 provincial election, defeating Liberal Alf Stong in the riding of York Centre. He served as a backbench supporter of Bill Davis's government for four years. Cousens initially supported Dennis Timbrell to succeed Davis in the Progressive Conservative Party's 1985 leadership convention, but crossed over to Frank Miller on the last ballot. He was named parliamentary assistant to the Minister of Citizenship and Culture on February 25, 1985, shortly after Miller was sworn in as Premier of Ontario.

Cousens was re-elected in the 1985 provincial election, but the Progressive Conservatives were reduced to an unstable minority government. He was appointed Minister of Correctional Services on May 17, but accomplished little of consequence before the Miller government was defeated in the house in June. Along with other members of the Tory caucus, he moved to the opposition benches as Liberal leader David Peterson became Premier.

The Progressive Conservatives were reduced to only 16 seats in the 1987 provincial election. Cousens defeated Liberal candidate Gail Newall by fewer than 1,000 votes in the new riding of Markham.

In the 1990 provincial elections, Cousens scored a victory over Liberal Frank Scarpitti, winning by more than 10,000 votes. The Progressive Conservatives as a whole managed only a modest recovery, however, increased their caucus size from sixteen to twenty. He served as his party's critic for Environment, Finance, and Citizenship, Race Relations and Human Rights at various times in next parliament. Interviewed by the CBC in 1988, he spoke against voting rights for people who lived in mental health facilities. He criticized Liberal Member of Provincial Parliament (MPP) John Sola in 1991, after Sola made comments about Canadian Serbs that were generally regarded as racist. Sola was later expelled from the Liberal Party.

Cousens once brought forward a private member's bill to outlaw smoking in public places.

A Red Tory by inclination, Cousens played little role in the party's drift to the right under Mike Harris. He resigned his seat in the legislature on September 30, 1994 to campaign for mayor of Markham.

=== Cabinet positions ===
Miller ministry, Province of Ontario (1985)
Cabinet post (1)
Predecessor	Office	Successor
Nick Leluk	Minister of Correctional Services; 1985 (May–June)	Ken Keyes

== Municipal politics ==
Markham is considered a diverse community with a thriving economy, and grew significantly under Cousens's watch. During that time, the town was debt free and gained many jobs in the software field. Unlike Mike Harris's provincial government, Cousens was a supporter of photo radar to discourage speeding in the Greater Toronto Area.

There is a Don Cousens Charitable Foundation within Markham. In 2003, he was award a Queen Elizabeth II Golden Jubilee Medal.

On June 1, 2006 Cousens announced that he would not seek re-election as Mayor of Markham due to on-going health problems related to the need for a kidney transplant.

Donald Cousens Parkway in Markham is named after him. There is also a public school in Markham, Donald Cousens Public School, named after him.
