= Nashville Community Oversight Board =

Police oversight board in Nashville, Tennessee, US

Metro Nashville Community Oversight Board
CoB overview
- Jurisdiction: Nashville, Tennessee
- Employees: 15
- Annual budget: 2,171,900
- CoB executives: Alisha Haddock, Chair; Joe Brown, First Vice Chair; Walter Holloway, Second Vice Chair; Drew Goddard, Secretary
- Key document: Amendement 1
- Website: Official website

The Community Oversight Board (COB) of Nashville, Tennessee is an independent body to review cases of alleged Metropolitan Nashville police misconduct. It appeared as Amendment 1 on the November 6, 2018 ballot in Davidson County and was approved by voters by a margin of 134,371 votes in support (58.81%) to 94,129 votes against (41.19%).

== Members ==
The board has 11 members: 7 nominated by community organizations or private petitions of at least 50 Davidson County residents, 2 by City Council Representatives, and 2 by the Mayor. At least 4 must come from economically distressed areas.

On January 22, 2019, the Metro Council appointed the first members of the COB. Of the Board's 11 initial members:

- 7 were Black
- 1 was Latino
- at least 2 identified as LGBT
- 6 were women, 7 were men

As of October 2022, the Board was composed of:

- 4 Black women
- 3 Black men
- 3 white men

Current officers:

- Chair: Alisha Haddock
- First Vice Chair: Joe Brown
- Second Vice Chair: Walter Holloway
- Secretary: Andrew Goddard

Members of the Community Oversight Board
Name	Background	Nominated by	Notes
Alisha Haddock	Senior Vice President of Community and Economic Development at the Housing Fund. Nonprofit professional with decades of experience serving under-resourced and under-developed communities in Nashville.	council member	Chairperson
Michael Milliner	27 years of combined governmental experience as a public administrator and union leader for governments and special districts.	community	
Joe B. Brown	retired judge with five decades of judicial experience.	community	First Vice-Chair
Andrew J. Goddard	former head of the Environmental Practice Group of Bass, Berry & Sims and First Vice President of the Legal Aid Society of Middle Tennessee.	Mayor	Secretary
Phyllis Hildreth	currently serves as Vice President for Institutional Advancement and Strategic Partnerships at American Baptist College, former Chief Counsel in the Office of the Public Defender for the State of Maryland.	Mayor	
Walter Holloway	retired Metro police officer with over three decades of experience.	council member	Second Vice-Chair
Makayla McCree	Organizing Director at Organize Tennessee, formerly worked in the office of US Congressman Jim Cooper.	community	
Maxine Spencer	organizer with Workers’ Dignity	community	
Demerrius LaShawn Whitsell	writer, producer, director, works with Southern Word	community	
Mark Wynn	20+ years of experience as MNPD officer, works with the US Department of Justice	community	
Vacant		community	To be filled by 11/1/22

== Staff ==
The COB is budgeted a staff of 15 employees to support the work and mission of the Board. The staff are colloquially referred to as Metro Nashville Community Oversight (MNCO). In FY22-23, MNCO was staffed at the following levels:

- (1) Executive Director
- (1) Assistant Director
- (1) Administrative Services Manager
- (1) Legal Advisor
- (5) Investigators
- (2) Research Analysts
- (1) Data and Evidence Technician
- (1) Community Liaison
- (1) Social Worker
- (1) Administrative Assistant

== History ==
The Amendment was proposed based on a petition by Community Oversight Now. The Fraternal Order of Police sued, claiming that the number of signatures on the petition was too low. However, the Davidson County Election Commission voted on August 15, 2018, to add it to the November 2018 ballot.

The Metro Council received more than 150 nominations for membership, and the Council's January 22, 2019, meeting to appoint members lasted 5 hours.

=== General Assembly pushback ===
During the opening weeks of the 111th Tennessee General Assembly, many Republican leaders began openly debating limiting the powers of the Board. On February 4, 2019, Representative Michael Curcio (R-Dickson), the chairman of the House Judiciary Committee, announced he would be introducing legislation to eliminate the diversity requirements of the board, including any requirements based on employment history, economic status, or demographics. It would also revoke the board's subpoena power. This legislation would apply to any community oversight board in the state, not just Nashville's.
