= Markham—Unionville (provincial electoral district) =

Provincial electoral district in Ontario, Canada

Coordinates: 43.846°N 79.305°W

Ontario electoral district
- Markham—Unionville in relation to other Greater Toronto ridings

Provincial electoral district
- Legislature: Legislative Assembly of Ontario
MPP
Billy Pang
Progressive Conservative
- District created: 2003
- First contested: 2007
- Last contested: 2025

Demographics
- Population (2021): 128,308
- Electors (2025): 92,247
- Area (km²): 84
- Pop. density (per km²): 1,527.5
- Census division: York
- Census subdivision: Markham

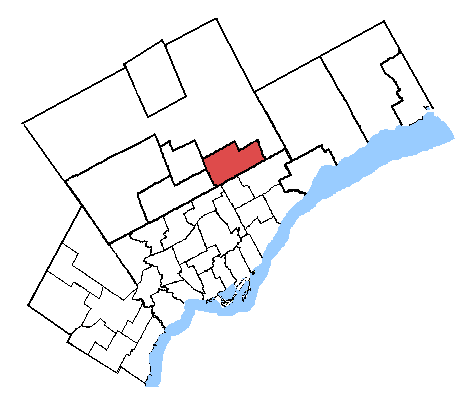
Markham-Unionville 2003 to 2018

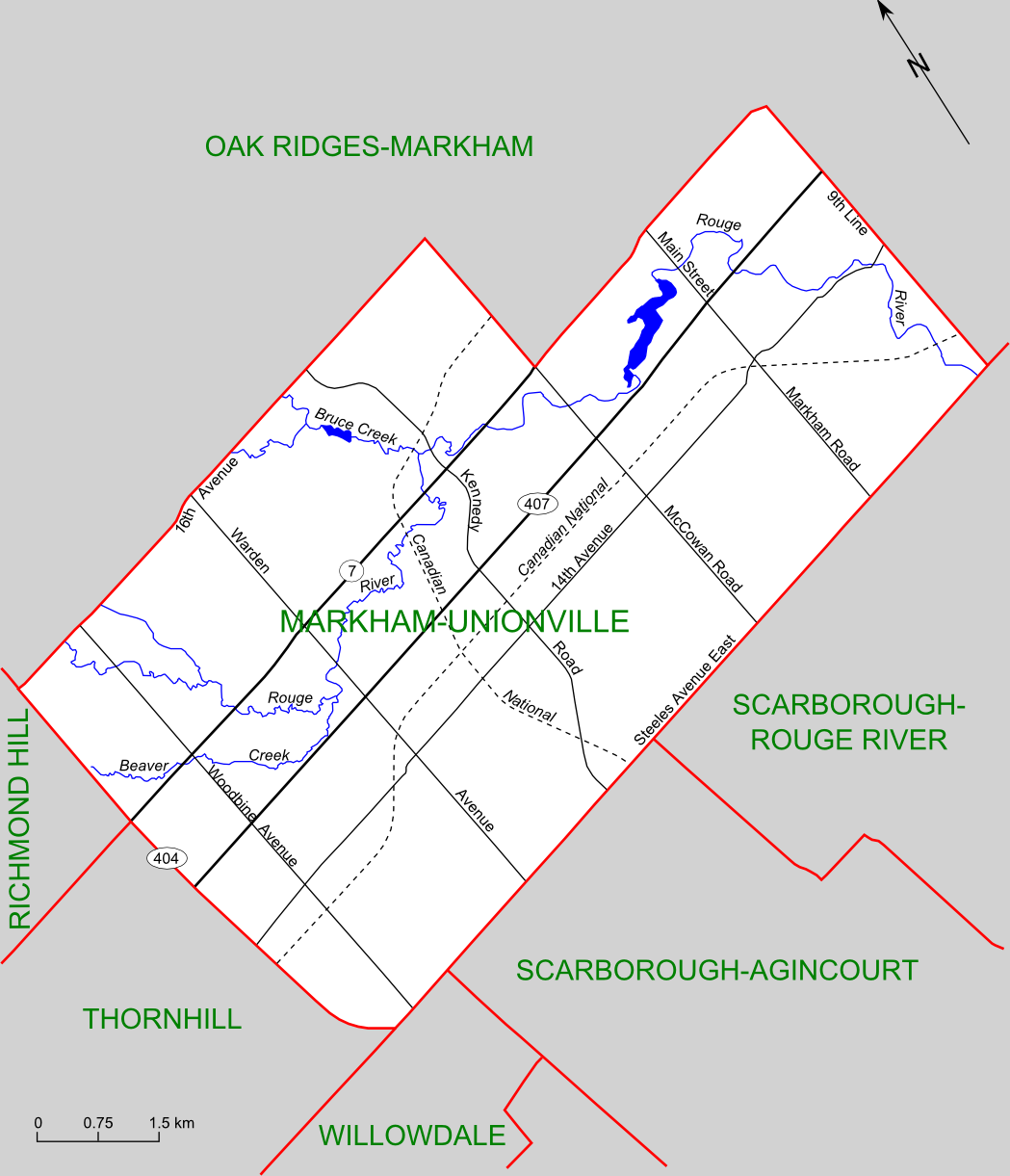
Map of Markham-Unionville (2003 to 2018)

Markham—Unionville is a provincial electoral district in Ontario, Canada, that has been represented in the Legislative Assembly of Ontario since the 2007 provincial election.

== History ==
Markham—Unionville is located in the province of Ontario, and covers suburban areas north of Toronto. It was created in 2003 from Markham.

It consists of the part of the city of Markham south of a line drawn from the southern limit of the city north on Highway 404, east along 16th Avenue, south along McCowan Road, east along Highway 7, and south along 9th Line to the southern limit of the city.

In the 2018 election, incumbent Michael Chan did not run for re-election. Liberal candidate Amanda Yeung Collucci, a sitting Markham councillor, drew attention for campaign signs that omitted her party's name and logo, and for a Facebook post in 2012 suggesting that the 9/11 terror attacks was an inside job.

== Members of Provincial Parliament ==
Markham—Unionville
Assembly	Years	Member	Party
Riding created from Markham
39th	2007–2011	Michael Chan	Liberal
40th	2011–2014	Michael Chan	Liberal
41st	2014–2018	Michael Chan	Liberal
42nd	2018–2022	Billy Pang	Progressive Conservative
43rd	2022–2025	Billy Pang	Progressive Conservative
44th	2025–present	Billy Pang	Progressive Conservative

== Election results ==
Winning party in each polling division of Markham—Unionville at the 2025 Ontario general election

2025 Ontario general election
Party	Candidate	Votes	%	±%
Progressive Conservative	Billy Pang	20,113	61.16	+4.74
Liberal	Jagbir Dosanjh	10,158	30.89	+0.47
New Democratic	Sameer Qureshi	1,298	3.95	–3.33
Green	Chris Madsen	772	2.35	–1.32
New Blue	Nick Boudreau	545	1.66	+0.14
Total valid votes		32,886	99.45	
Total rejected, unmarked and declined ballots		183	0.55	–0.05
Turnout		33,069	35.88	–3.25
Eligible voters		92,176		
Progressive Conservative hold		Swing		+2.13
Source: Elections Ontario

Winning party in each polling division of Markham—Unionville at the 2022 Ontario general election

2022 Ontario general election
Party	Candidate	Votes	%	±%
Progressive Conservative	Billy Pang	19,985	56.42	–6.01
Liberal	Emily Li	10,774	30.42	+12.40
New Democratic	Senthil Mahalingam	2,579	7.28	–9.29
Green	Shanta Sundarason	1,299	3.67	+1.55
New Blue	Trina Kollis	536	1.51	–
Ontario Party	Naz Obredor	249	0.70	–
Total valid votes		35,422	99.39	
Total rejected, unmarked and declined ballots		216	0.61	–0.46
Turnout		35,638	39.12	–15.62
Eligible voters		91,097		
Progressive Conservative hold		Swing		–9.21
Source: Elections Ontario

2018 Ontario general election
Party	Candidate	Votes	%	±%
Progressive Conservative	Billy Pang	29,305	62.43	+21.62
Liberal	Amanda Yeung Collucci	8,456	18.01	–25.87
New Democratic	Sylvie David	7,778	16.57	+6.63
Green	Deborah Moolman	996	2.12	–1.68
Libertarian	Allen Small	244	0.52	–1.06
Moderate	Anastasia Afonina	161	0.34	–
Total valid votes		46,940	98.94	
Total rejected, unmarked and declined ballots		505	1.06	
Turnout		47,445	54.74	
Eligible voters		86,671		
Progressive Conservative notional gain from Liberal		Swing		+23.75
Source: Elections Ontario

2014 general election redistributed results
Party	Vote	%
Liberal	15,142	43.88
Progressive Conservative	14,082	40.81
New Democratic	3,430	9.94
Green	1,311	3.80
Others	546	1.58

2014 Ontario general election
Party	Candidate	Votes	%	±%
Liberal	Michael Chan	21,517	51.33	–1.25
Progressive Conservative	Shan Thayaparan	14,241	33.98	+2.50
New Democratic	Nadine Kormos Hawkins	4,205	10.03	–2.25
Green	Myles O'Brien	1,509	3.60	+0.64
Libertarian	Allen Small	444	1.06	+0.36
Total valid votes		41,916	98.67	
Total rejected, unmarked and declined ballots		563	1.33	+0.57
Turnout		42,479	44.54	+3.86
Eligible voters		95,367		
Liberal hold		Swing		–1.87
Source: Elections Ontario

2011 Ontario general election
Party	Candidate	Votes	%	±%
Liberal	Michael Chan	19,579	52.58	–6.89
Progressive Conservative	Shan Thayaparan	11,720	31.47	+4.55
New Democratic	P. C. Choo	4,575	12.29	+4.98
Green	Myles O'Brien	1,104	2.96	–2.41
Libertarian	Allen Small	259	0.70	–
Total valid votes		37,237	99.24	
Total rejected, unmarked and declined ballots		284	0.76	–0.25
Turnout		37,521	40.68	+0.17
Eligible voters		92,232		
Liberal hold		Swing		–5.72
Source: Elections Ontario

2007 Ontario general election
Party	Candidate	Votes	%
Liberal	Michael Chan	21,149	59.47
Progressive Conservative	Ki Kit Li	9,574	26.92
New Democratic	Andy Arifin	2,597	7.30
Green	Bernadette Manning	1,910	5.37
Family Coalition	Leon Williams	335	0.94
Total valid votes		35,565	98.99
Total rejected, unmarked and declined ballots		362	1.01
Turnout		35,927	40.51
Eligible voters		88,688	
Liberal pickup new district.			
Source: Elections Ontario

== 2007 electoral reform referendum ==
2007 Ontario electoral reform referendum
Side	Votes	%
First Past the Post	20,156	58.8
Mixed member proportional	14,143	41.2
Total valid votes	34,299	100.0

== See also ==
- List of Ontario provincial electoral districts
- Canadian provincial electoral districts
