= Lucien Lamoureux =

Canadian politician (1920–1998)

The Honourable Lucien Lamoureux PC OC
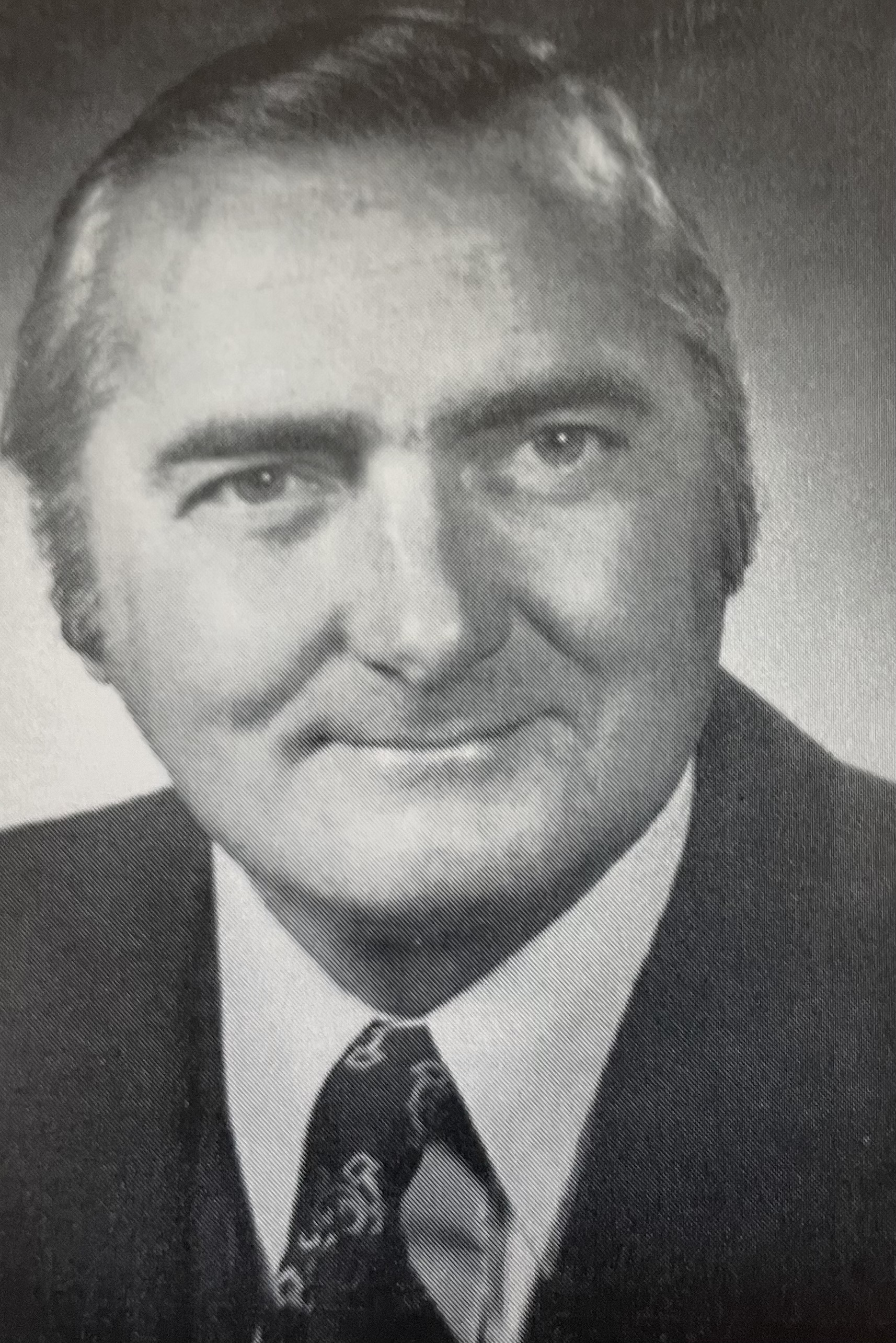

27th Speaker of the House of Commons
- In office January 18, 1966 – September 29, 1974
- Preceded by: Alan Macnaughton
- Succeeded by: James Jerome

Member of Parliament for Stormont—Dundas
- In office June 25, 1968 – July 8, 1974
- Preceded by: Riding created
- Succeeded by: Ed Lumley

Member of Parliament for Stormont
- In office June 18, 1962 – June 25, 1968
- Preceded by: Grant Campbell
- Succeeded by: Riding dissolved

Personal details
- Born: August 3, 1920 Ottawa, Ontario, Canada
- Died: July 16, 1998 (aged 77)
- Party: Liberal (1962–1968; 1974–1998); Independent (1968–1974)
- Occupation: Lawyer

Lucien Lamoureux PC OC (French pronunciation: [lysjɛ̃ lamuʁø]; August 3, 1920 – July 16, 1998) was a Canadian politician and the 27th speaker of the House of Commons from 1966 to 1974. He is the second longest-serving occupant of that office.

== Early life ==
Lamoureux was born and raised in Ottawa to Prime and Graziella (née Madore) Lamoureux.

== Career ==
After graduating with a law degree from Osgoode Hall in 1945, Lamoureux worked as a political aide to Lionel Chevrier, a Canadian Cabinet minister in the government of Prime Minister William Lyon Mackenzie King. In 1954, he left Chevrier's office to establish a law practice in Cornwall, Ontario.

Lamoureux was first elected to the House of Commons of Canada in the 1962 election as a Liberal Member of Parliament (MP). In 1963, he became deputy speaker of the House of Commons and decided to stop attending meetings of the Liberal caucus in order to maintain impartiality. Following the 1965 election, prime minister Lester Pearson nominated him to the position of speaker of the House of Commons.

Lamoureux served as speaker during two minority governments, 1965–1968 and 1972–1974, experiences that required him to maintain authority and neutrality in a situation where no party had control of the House.

=== 1968 election ===
In the 1968 election, he decided to follow the custom of the speaker of the House of Commons of the United Kingdom and stand for election as an independent. Both the Liberal Party and the Progressive Conservative Party agreed not to run candidates against him. The New Democratic Party, however, declined to withdraw their candidate. Lamoureux was re-elected and continued to serve as speaker.

=== 1972 election and beyond ===
In the 1972 election, Lamoureux again ran as an independent, this time both the Tories and the NDP ran candidates against him. Lamoureux won re-election by a margin of 5,000 votes. Without an all-party agreement to not run against sitting speakers in general elections, however, Lamoureux's wish for Canada to follow the British precedent was doomed, and future speakers would not repeat his attempt to run as an independent. As the election produced a minority government for the Liberals who had only two more seats than the Conservatives, the closeness of it was perhaps the reason why the opposition parties would choose not to follow such a precedent.

In April 1974, Lamoureux became the longest serving speaker in the history of the House of Commons, surpassing the record set by Rodolphe Lemieux. In September 1973, Lamoureux announced that he would not run in the 1974 election, and retired from Parliament. He was appointed Canadian ambassador to Belgium following the election and after to as ambassador in Portugal from 1980 to 1985. Lamoureux retired and moved to Waterloo where died in 1998. Lamoureux was buried at Notre-Dame Cemetery in Ottawa.

== Honors and awareds ==
Lamoureux served as honorary lieutenant colonel of the Stormont, Dundas and Glengarry Highlanders from 1974 to 1980.

In 1998, he was made an officer of the Order of Canada.

On October 12, 2009, Peter Milliken surpassed Lamoureux's record to become the longest-serving occupant of the speaker's chair.

== Electoral record ==
1972 Canadian federal election: Stormont—Dundas
Party	Candidate	Votes	%	±%
Independent	Lucien Lamoureux	17,347	52.64	-23.24
Progressive Conservative	Grant Campbell	12,364	37.52	
New Democratic	Murray Forsyth	3,108	9.43	-14.69
Independent	René Benoit	138	0.42	
Total valid votes		32,957		
Turnout (based on valid votes; total votes not available)		32,957	73.98	+16.0
Eligible voters		44,546		
Source: Elections Canada and Canada Elections Database

1968 Canadian federal election: Stormont—Dundas
Party	Candidate	Votes	%
Independent	Lucien Lamoureux	17,014	75.88
New Democratic	Tim Wees	5,409	24.12
Total valid votes		22,423	
Turnout (based on valid votes; total votes not available)		22,423	57.98
Eligible voters		38,672	
Source: Elections Canada and Canada Elections Database

1965 Canadian federal election: Stormont
Party	Candidate	Votes	%	±%
Liberal	Lucien Lamoureux	13,530	56.0	
Progressive Conservative	Ken Bergeron	7,458	30.8	
New Democratic	John B. Trew	3,201	13.2	
Total valid votes		24,189		
Total rejected ballots		215		
Turnout		24,404	78.66	-1.64
Eligible voters		31,025		
Source: Elections Canada and Canada Elections Database

1963 Canadian federal election: Stormont
Party	Candidate	Votes	%	±%
Liberal	Lucien Lamoureux	13,285	53.9	
Progressive Conservative	John Alguire	9,728	39.4	
Social Credit	Ludger Boileau	851	3.5	
New Democratic	Bill Kilger	801	3.2	
Total valid votes		24,665		
Turnout (based on valid votes; total votes not available)		24,665	80.3	-0.24
Eligible voters		30,716		
Source: Elections Canada and the Canada Elections Database

1962 Canadian federal election: Stormont
Party	Candidate	Votes	%	±%
Liberal	Lucien Lamoureux	11,363	45.7	
Progressive Conservative	Grant Campbell	11,293	45.4	
Social Credit	Melvin Andrew Rowat	1,256	5.1	
New Democratic	Marjorie Ball	946	3.8	
Total valid votes		24,858		
Turnout (based on valid votes; total votes not available)		24,858	80.54	-2.99
Eligible voters		30,866		
Note: Due to the death of Albert Lavigne, the Liberal candidate for the riding of Stormont, on June 5, 1962, the general election scheduled for June 18, 1962 was postponed in this riding until July 16, 1962.
Source: Elections Canada and Canada Elections Database

Parliament of Canada
Preceded by Grant Campbell	Member of Parliament for Stormont; 1962–1968	Succeeded by Electoral district was abolished
Preceded by None	Member of Parliament for Stormont—Dundas; 1968–1974	Succeeded by Ed Lumley
Political offices
Preceded by Gordon Chown	Deputy Speaker and Chairman of Committees of the Whole of the House of Commons; 1963-05-16–1965-09-08	Succeeded by Herman Maxwell Batten
Diplomatic posts
Preceded by Jean-Yves Grenon	Canadian Ambassador to Belgium; 1974–1980	Succeeded by d'Iberville Fortier
Preceded by Jules Léger	Canadian Ambassador to Luxembourg; 1974–1980	Succeeded by d'Iberville Fortier
Preceded by Daniel Albert Bernard Molgat	Canadian Ambassador to Portugal; 1980–1984	Succeeded by Cyril Lloyd Francis
