= Oscar Fulton =

Canadian politician

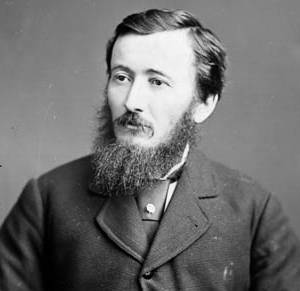

Member of the Canadian Parliament for Stormont
- In office 1878–1882
- Preceded by: Cyril Archibald
- Succeeded by: Robert Abercrombie Pringle

Personal details
- Born: 22 March 1843 Cornwall Township, Canada West
- Died: 22 November 1907 (aged 64)
- Party: Liberal-Conservative

Military service
- Allegiance: Canadian Militia
- Years of service: 1866 - 1872
- Rank: Captain
- Unit: Dickinson’s Landing Infantry Company; 59th Stormont and Glengarry Battalion
- Battles/wars: Fenian Raids (1870)

Oscar Fulton (March 22, 1843 – November 22, 1907) was an Ontario merchant and political figure. He represented Stormont in the House of Commons of Canada as a Liberal-Conservative member from 1878 to 1882.

He was born in Cornwall Township in Canada West in 1843. He operated a store, sawmill and tannery at Avonmore in partnership with his brother-in-law; they were also involved in the sale of lumber.

Fulton served with the Canadian Militia joining the Dickinson's Landing Infantry Company on July 20, 1866 as a Lieutenant. The company became part of the 59th Stormont and Glengarry Battalion in 1868 and he served with the battalion at Cornwall during the Fenian Raids of 1870. He left the battalion on March 22, 1872.

== Electoral record ==
1878 Canadian federal election: Stormont
Party	Candidate	Votes	%	±%
Conservative	Oscar Fulton	1,082	55.0	
Liberal	Cyril Archibald	885	45.0	
Total valid votes		1,967		
Total rejected ballots		66		
Turnout		2,033	79.66	+1.12
Eligible voters		2,552		
Source: Elections Canada and Canada Elections Database

Parliament of Canada
Preceded by Cyril Archibald	Member of Parliament for Stormont; 1878–1882	Succeeded by The electoral district was abolished in 1882.
