= Grant Campbell (Canadian politician) =

Canadian politician

James Campbell

Member of Parliament for Stormont
- In office March 1958 – June 1962
- Preceded by: Albert Lavigne
- Succeeded by: Lucien Lamoureux

Personal details
- Born: James Alistair Grant Campbell; 26 August 1922 Cornwall, Ontario
- Died: 12 March 2008 (aged 85) Lancaster, Ontario
- Party: Progressive Conservative
- Spouse: Edith Priscilla Wanklyn
- Profession: barrister, lawyer

James Alistair Grant Campbell QC, LL.B, UE (26 August 1922 – 12 March 2008) was a Progressive Conservative party member of the House of Commons of Canada. He was born in Cornwall, Ontario and became a barrister and lawyer by career.

After an unsuccessful attempt to gain a House of Commons seat at the Stormont riding in the 1957 federal election, he won the riding against incumbent Albert Lavigne in the 1958 election. After his only term, the 24th Canadian Parliament, he was defeated by Liberal candidate Lucien Lamoureux in the 1962 election. Campbell campaigned in one further election in Stormont during the 1972 election but was again unsuccessful.

Campbell died in Lancaster, Ontario aged 85.

== Electoral record ==
1957 Canadian federal election: Stormont
Party	Candidate	Votes	%	±%
Liberal	Albert Lavigne	12,505	53.5	
Progressive Conservative	Grant Campbell	10,215	43.7	
Social Credit	Melvin Andrew Rowat	646	2.8	
Total valid votes		23,366		
Total rejected ballots		305		
Turnout		23,671	75.24	-5.24
Eligible voters		31,462		
Source: Elections Canada and Canada Elections Database

1958 Canadian federal election: Stormont
Party	Candidate	Votes	%	±%
Progressive Conservative	Grant Campbell	13,964	53.1	
Liberal	Albert Lavigne	11,977	45.6	
Social Credit	Melvin Andrew Rowat	331	1.3	
Total valid votes		26,272		
Total rejected ballots		345		
Turnout		26,617	83.53	+8.29
Eligible voters		31,866		
Source: Elections Canada, Canada Elections Database, and Cornwall Standard-Freeholder

1962 Canadian federal election: Stormont
Party	Candidate	Votes	%	±%
Liberal	Lucien Lamoureux	11,363	45.7	
Progressive Conservative	Grant Campbell	11,293	45.4	
Social Credit	Melvin Andrew Rowat	1,256	5.1	
New Democratic	Marjorie Ball	946	3.8	
Total valid votes		24,858		
Turnout (based on valid votes; total votes not available)		24,858	80.54	-2.99
Eligible voters		30,866		
Note: Due to the death of Albert Lavigne, the Liberal candidate for the riding of Stormont, on June 5, 1962, the general election scheduled for June 18, 1962 was postponed in this riding until July 16, 1962.
Source: Elections Canada and Canada Elections Database
