= Aultsville, Ontario =

Aultsville
- Ghost town
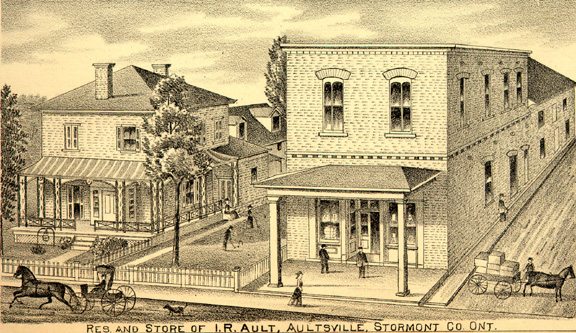
- Sketch of Aultsville from the 1800s

- Location within Ontario Location within Canada
- Coordinates: 44°57′19″N 75°01′44″W
- Country: Canada
- Province: Ontario
- Founded: 1787
- Founded by: United Empire Loyalists

Population (1958)
  - Total: 312
- Time zone: UTC−5 (EST)
  - Summer (DST): UTC−4 (EDT)
- Abandoned: 1958

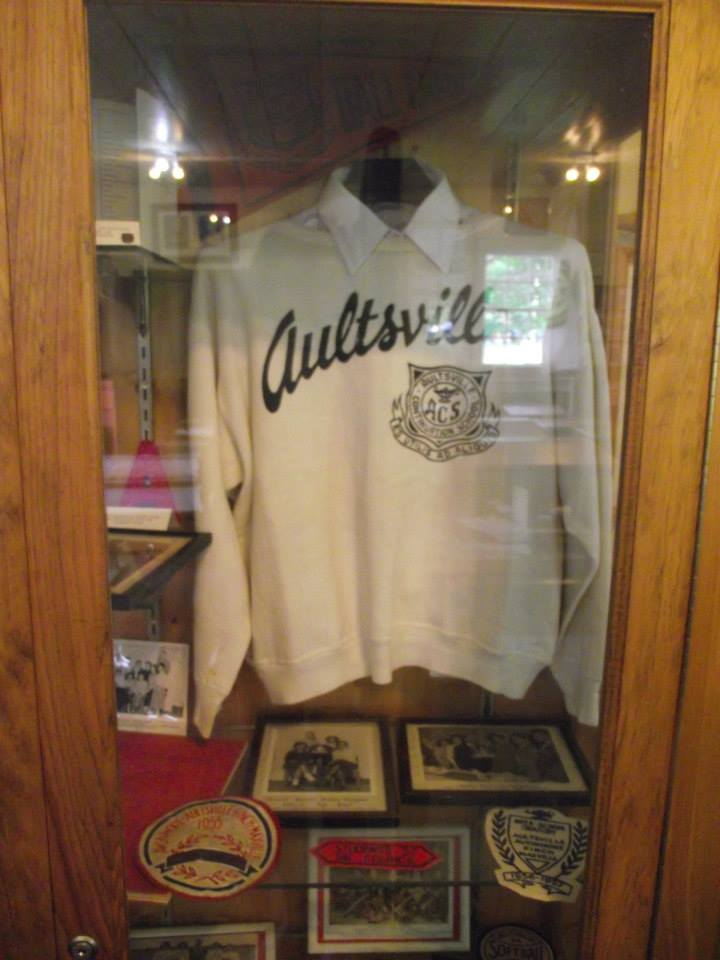
Sweater which was once given to alumni of a school located in Aultsville

Aultsville is a ghost town in the Canadian province of Ontario. It is one of Ontario's Lost Villages, which were permanently flooded by the creation of the St. Lawrence Seaway in 1958. The town was founded as Charlesville in 1787 by United Empire Loyalists and reached its peak in 1880, when it had 400 residents. It was the second largest town flooded by the new Seaway in 1958, with a population of 312 at the time. Before it was flooded, the abandoned buildings were burned to study the effects of fire on houses.

Families and businesses in Aultsville were moved to the new town of Ingleside before the seaway construction commenced. Some just north of Upper Canada Village where it now stands had three addresses in one week. Some walks, lanes, and yards can still be seen today. The historic train station, built in the 19th century by the Grand Trunk Railway, was moved to Upper Canada Village where it remains today.

Aultsville was named after Samuel Ault, a local businessman who represented Stormont County in the Legislative Assembly of the Province of Canada and the House of Commons of Canada.

The Holstein-Friesian breed of cattle were first imported into Canada through Aultsville by a local resident. Michael P. Cook became the first importer of Holsteins into Ontario in 1881 when he imported two bulls and ten cows from Europe. This shipment of cattle founded the base of the Holstein breed here today, which is now the most popular dairy breed.

The road which currently leads into Upper Canada Migratory Bird Sanctuary was once a part of Aultsville Road, the village's main street. The road leads directly into the river, where you can still see sidewalks and foundations remaining from the town when the water levels of the St. Lawrence are low.

== History ==
Prior to being occupied by Europeans, Aultsville and the surrounding area was home to many Native American settlements. When the Loyalists arrived, the land was divided and distributed with little thought given to the Native populations. The Natives were forced out of the area early into the settlement's history.

=== Loyalist settlement and the 18th century ===
Aultsville, Ontario, was first settled in the late 1700s by a small group of five disbanded soldiers of the King's Royal Regiment of New York; these men were Loyalists who likely acquired the land here via grants for their loyalty to the Crown. Upon its initial settlement, the Loyalists called the settlement Charlesville, the origin of this name is unknown. Shortly after, the village became referred to as Aultsville after Samuel Ault, a relative of one of the first five men to settle here and a prominent political figure. The Ault family dammed the creek upon their arrival and established a saw mill on their property; the village essentially grew around this mill.

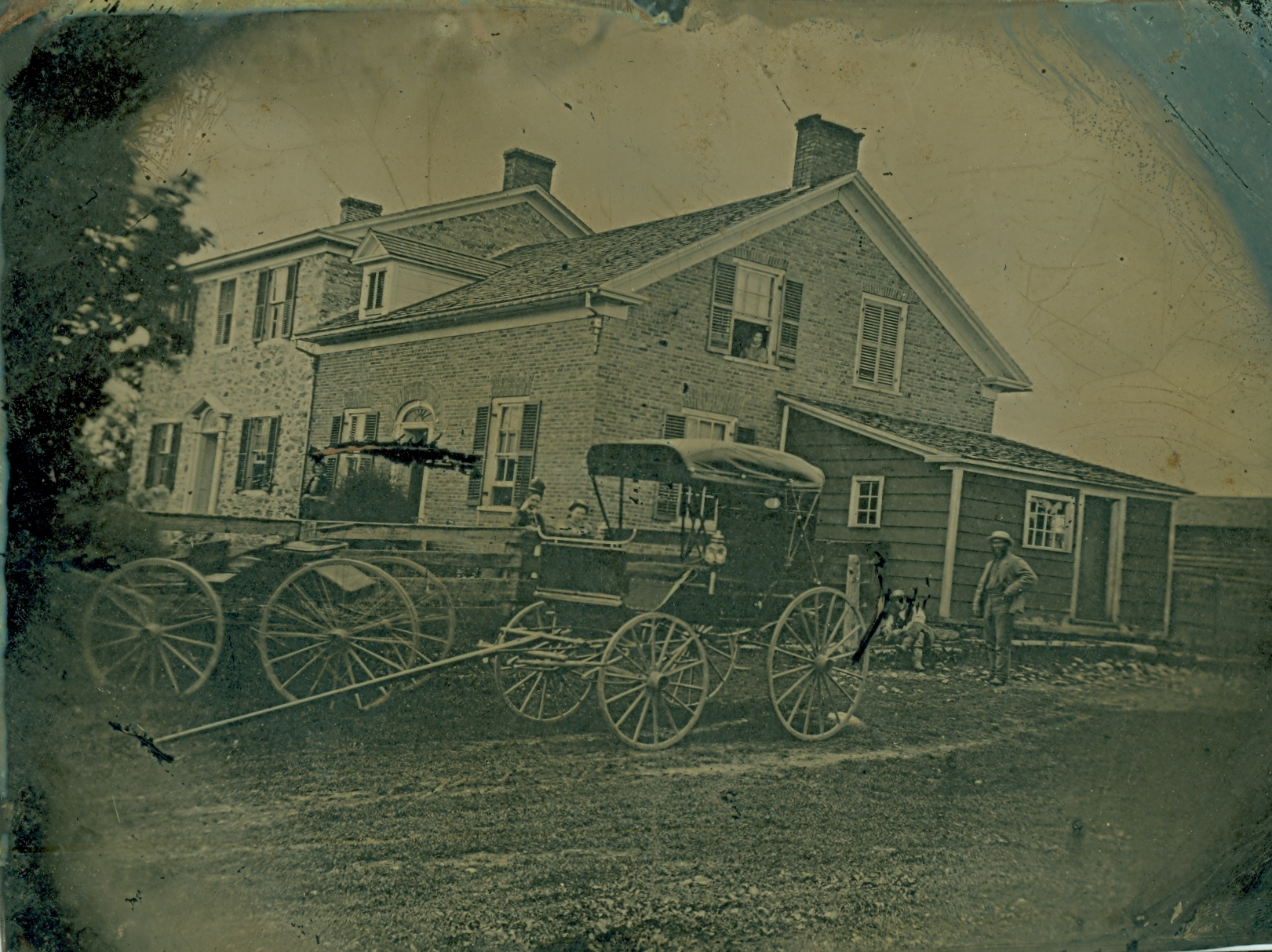
Tintype of the Merkle Home in Aultsville

The first store and tavern were present in the village in the 1700s, established in 1787 by a Loyalist settler named Richard Loucks. The tavern was referred to as Loucks tavern, and was a large wooden building. The tavern doubled as a courthouse and village jail, with a pillory located inside for locking up criminals.

By the end of the 18th century, Aultsville had already established its own post office with the first post master listed as one John Bockus. The post office remained in operation until 1957, when it closed for the flooding of the Seaway.

=== 19th century – World War I ===
By 1840, the population of Aultsville had risen to 120 individuals, and many more pioneer businesses and tradespeople were established in the area. The area continued to prosper on its own into the 1850s, however when the Grand Trunk Railway was established here in 1856 the village saw a boom in population; the village grew to a population of 400 residents by 1870.

Many businesses operated in Aultsville in the mid-1800s, according to both histories and business directories from the era. The clay soil in the village allowed for brickyards and pottery works to be established. Many pioneer trades such as a blacksmith shop, shoemaker, carriage shop and tannery were also active in the village. Two more saw mills were also eventually erected in the village. The community was also home to an Oddfellows lodge, community hall and Masonic lodge.

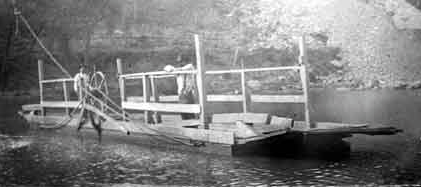
The Aultsville Ferry which ran between Aultsville and Louisville, New York from the mid-1800s until the 1930s.

During the mid-19th century, a small ferry operated in Aultsville in the St. Lawrence River called the Aultsville Ferry. The ferry was a small, primitive wooden ferry which operated between Aultsville and Louisville Landing, New York during the summer months. Many disputes arose between the American and Canadian sides regarding the ferry, as it was in direct competition with the American ferry.

Around 1860, Aultsville became home to its own school, referred to as the Aultsville Common School. This school served the elementary grades of the village. At some point closer to the 20th century, Aultsville established its own secondary school. This school is referred to in records as both Aultsville High School and Aultsville Continuation School. It is possible the school served as both at different periods; the difference between the two being that continuation schools served both elementary and secondary students. The secondary school and elementary school both operated until the 1950s, closing due to the flooding of the village. Aultsville High School had many sports teams including a hockey and baseball team, as well as a Cadet's Corps.

Near the end of the 19th-century, two taverns were operating in the area; Cook's tavern, and the Riverview Hotel. The Riverview Hotel served as an inn, and had a restaurant and tavern on site to serve patrons. Cook's tavern, also called Cook's tavern and livery had the same services. Both of these inns served the many stage coaches and carriages travelling along the King's Highway. Cook's tavern was later moved to Upper Canada Village to be preserved from the flooding.

=== 20th century ===
By the turn of the century, Aultsville had added three more general stores, three cheese factories, another garage, four service stations, and a bank to its list of businesses. A grist mill in Aultsville was built around 1929. The mill contained metal grinding plates which ran on an electric motor; the mill mostly ground the local farmers personal grain supplies. In later years, the grist mill was used as an egg grading office.

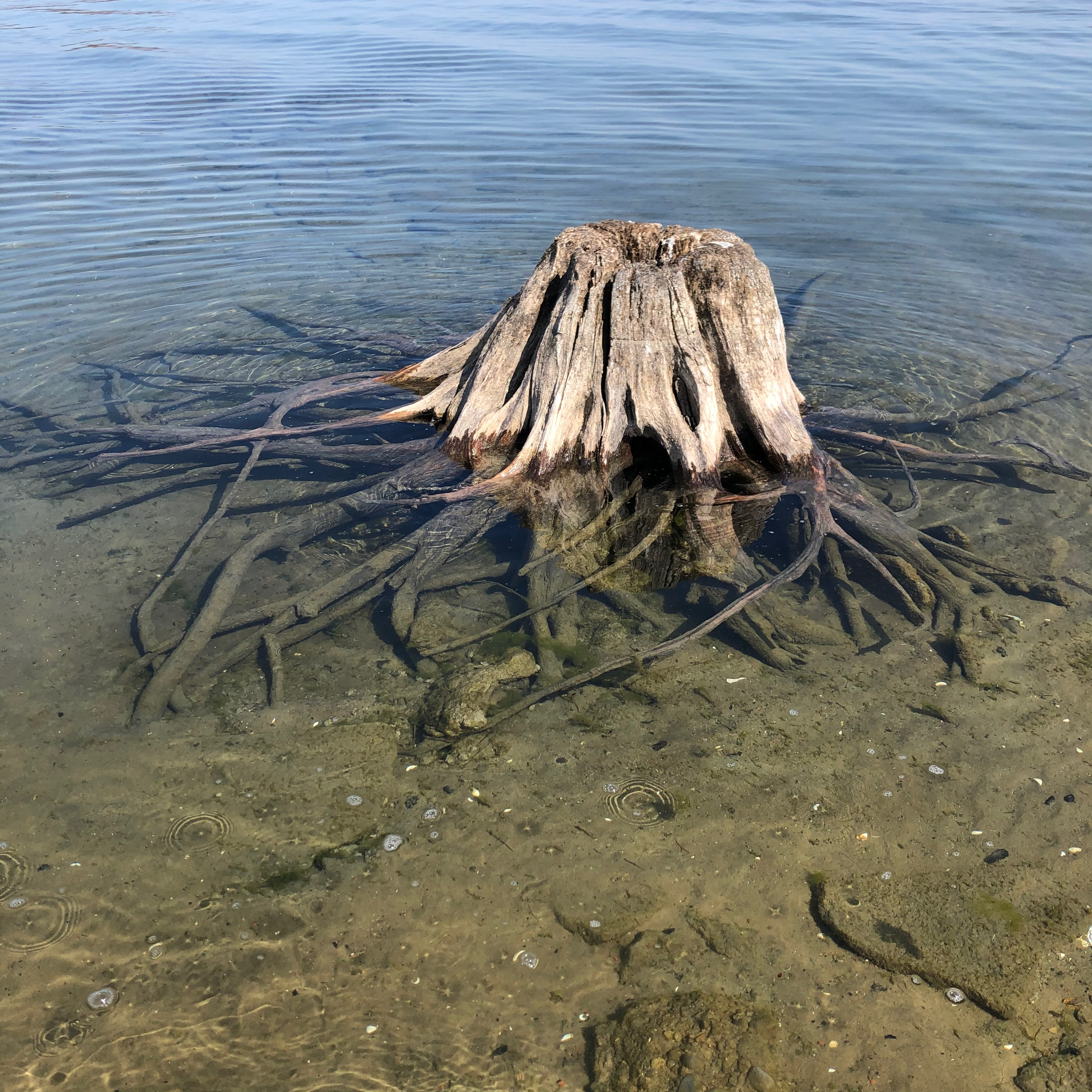
The stump of a tree sitting under the water of the St. Lawrence at the site of the former village of Aultsville, Ontario

The first cheese factory was known as Croil's and McCullough's factory, and was located near the train station; cheese made here was shipped as far away as Montreal. Later this cheese factory became the Edward's Cheese Factory, and two more factories opened in the village both of which were also operated by the Edward family. These cheese factories were powered by steam, using coal-fired boilers to heat cheese vats. The cream for these factories was cooled and kept cool using a primitive cold-storage method; ice was cut during the winter months from the St. Lawrence River and insulated with sawdust.

After World War II the village began to decline, many businesses closed and industries ceased operations. This was due to the fact roads in the area improved as had means of transportation; it was now feasible to travel to nearby communities for necessities. Additionally, many of the pioneer industries which once sustained Aultsville were becoming obsolete. By the mid-1950s, only one cheese factory, a bank, a general store and the schools remained in operation. In 1958, the decision was finally made to construct the seaway, and the village was scheduled for demolition. The trees were cut from the town and the buildings of Aultsville burned in a controlled fire to test the effects of fire on buildings. Around July 1, 1958, Aultsville began to be flooded along with the other Lost Villages, the process taking around 4 days.

== The St. Lawrence Seaway Project and its effects ==
Before studying the actual relocation of Aultsville and its populace, it is important to understand the development of the St. Lawrence Seaway Project first. Roughly sixty years was spent negotiating and planning the actual expansion of the St. Lawrence Seaway between the years of 1895 up until 1954; the later date being the final ratification from Canada and affected provinces as well as the United States and its affected States. The primary intention for the newly expanded waterway and flooding of 20,000 acres, was to transport tonnage in the millions of raw materials including but not limited to iron ore, grain, coal, wood pulp and petroleum.

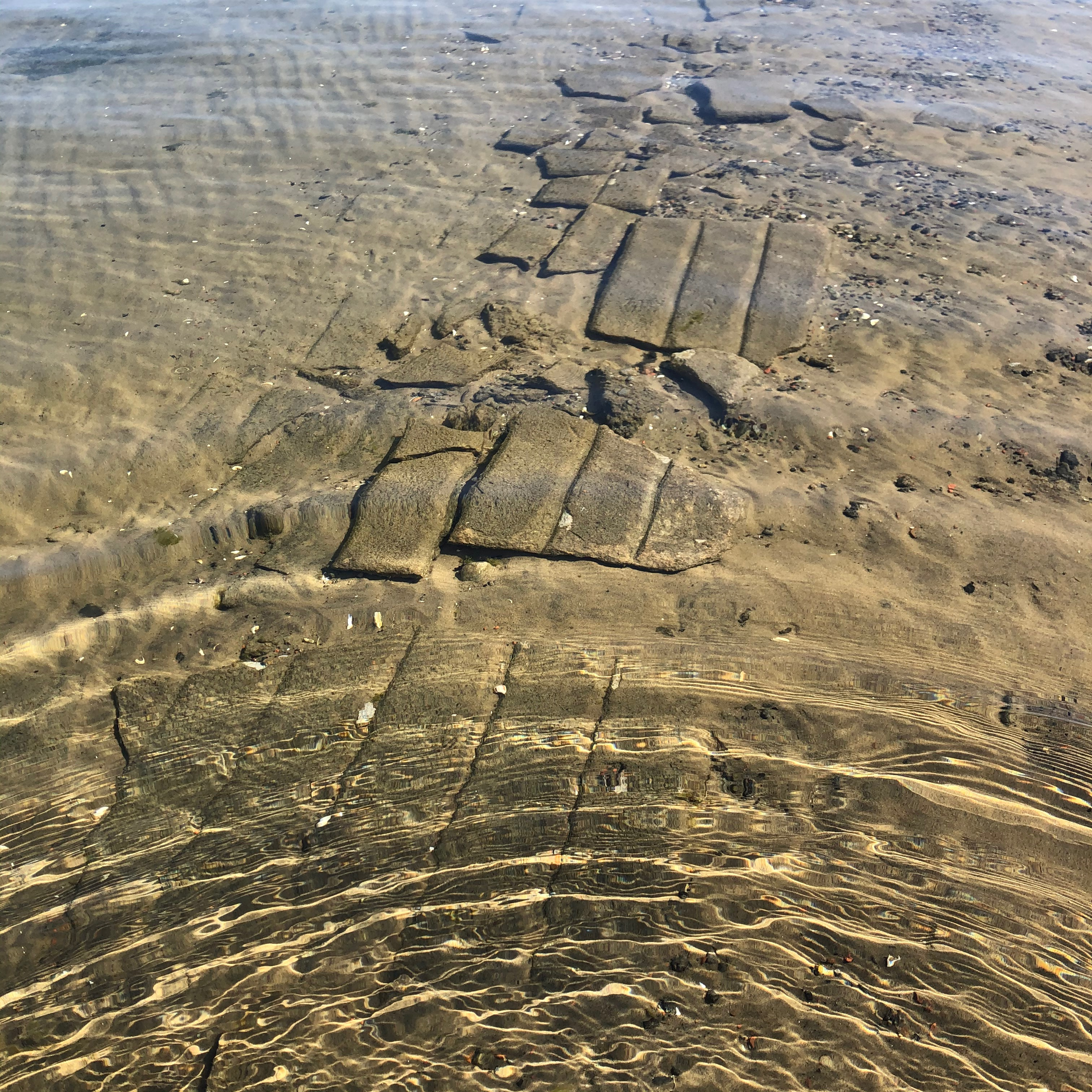
A broken concrete or cement walkway sitting under the St. Lawrence River at the former site of the village of Aultsville, Ontario

The first major delay took place during the First World War in 1914 until 1918. The study of Boundary Waters for Navigation and Power was put aside as resources were mainly directed towards the allied war effort.

It was not until 1939 when the Second World War started that the full benefits were realized of a larger seaway. Increased hydro needs as well as a recognition of the importance to national security put pressure on legislatures to get the project underway; however, a second major delay of the project happened in October 1942 (a year after the Japanese attack on Pearl Harbor) when President Roosevelt declared that the St. Lawrence project was to be halted immediately due to a shortage of men and metal.

After World War II many negotiations and minor delays took place until the final proposals and developments in 1954. Furthermore, not until the Canadian government started the initial phases of planning and construction, that the United States finally participated in the joint expansion of this international project.

It is noted that the Commission in Ontario made decisions for the location of new highways towns and parks without first approaching the local residents of Aultsville, or the other Lost Villages. According to the Lost Villages Historical Society, the residents of Aultsville knew the flooding was inevitable after decades of uncertainty when all of the trees in the community were cut down. The governments assumed there would be little repercussion since there were plans to relocate nearly 6,500 people six miles west of Cornwall, Ontario; the new towns would have new and upgraded infrastructures such as modern sewer systems and roadways. This was not necessarily the case, as many of the residents could not afford to move to or live in these upgraded towns even after selling their land and receiving the additional aid provided. In all, 600 homes were evacuated in both Canada and the United States along with many hundreds of farms (200 in Canada alone).

== Fire testing and burning ==
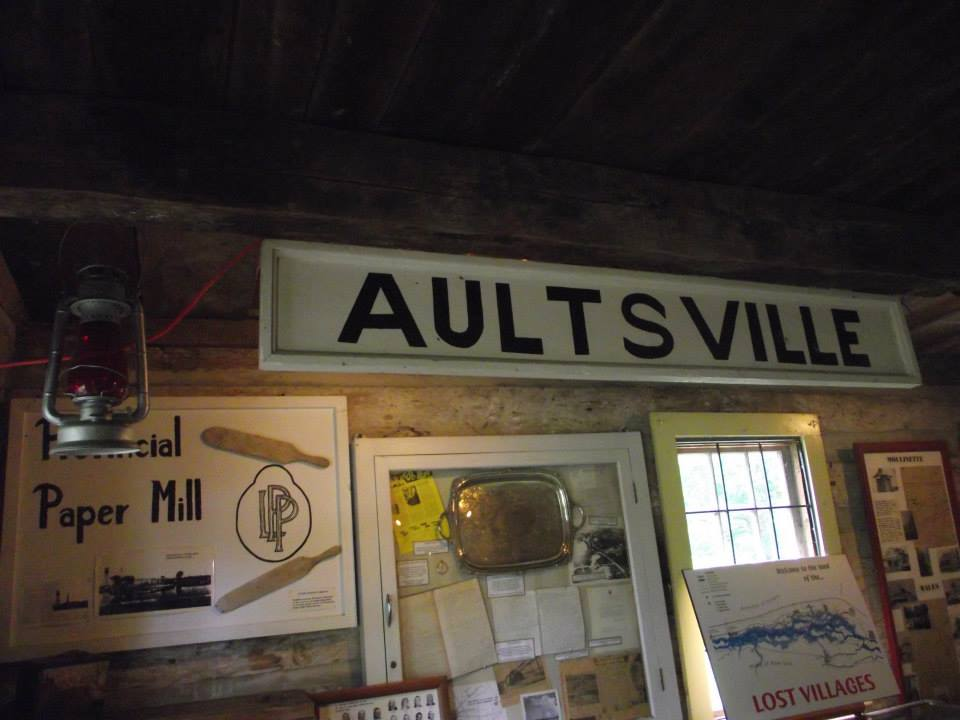
Old sign from Aultsville

In 1958, before the flooding of the Seaway, six houses and two larger buildings were scheduled to be burned in the vacant village of Aultsville. This was an important study headed by National Research Council Canada's Division of Building Research to study the effects of controlled burning structures. Contributors to this project were the British Joint Fire Research Organization, the US Federal Civil Defense Authority, the Ontario Fire Marshal and staff, and lastly the Hydro-Electric Power Commission of Ontario. The director was G.W. Shorter who was Head of Fire Section (for his division) as well Assistant Director N.B. Hutcheon.

In the General Report, significant observances are made from the Smoke and Sound Measurements and the Temperature Measurements, to the Ventilation Rate Measurements and the Radiant Temperature of Openings. Other sections of the study also included Radiometer Measurements, Resistance Thermometer Measurements, a Gas Analysis, and to conclude, the Summary Report.

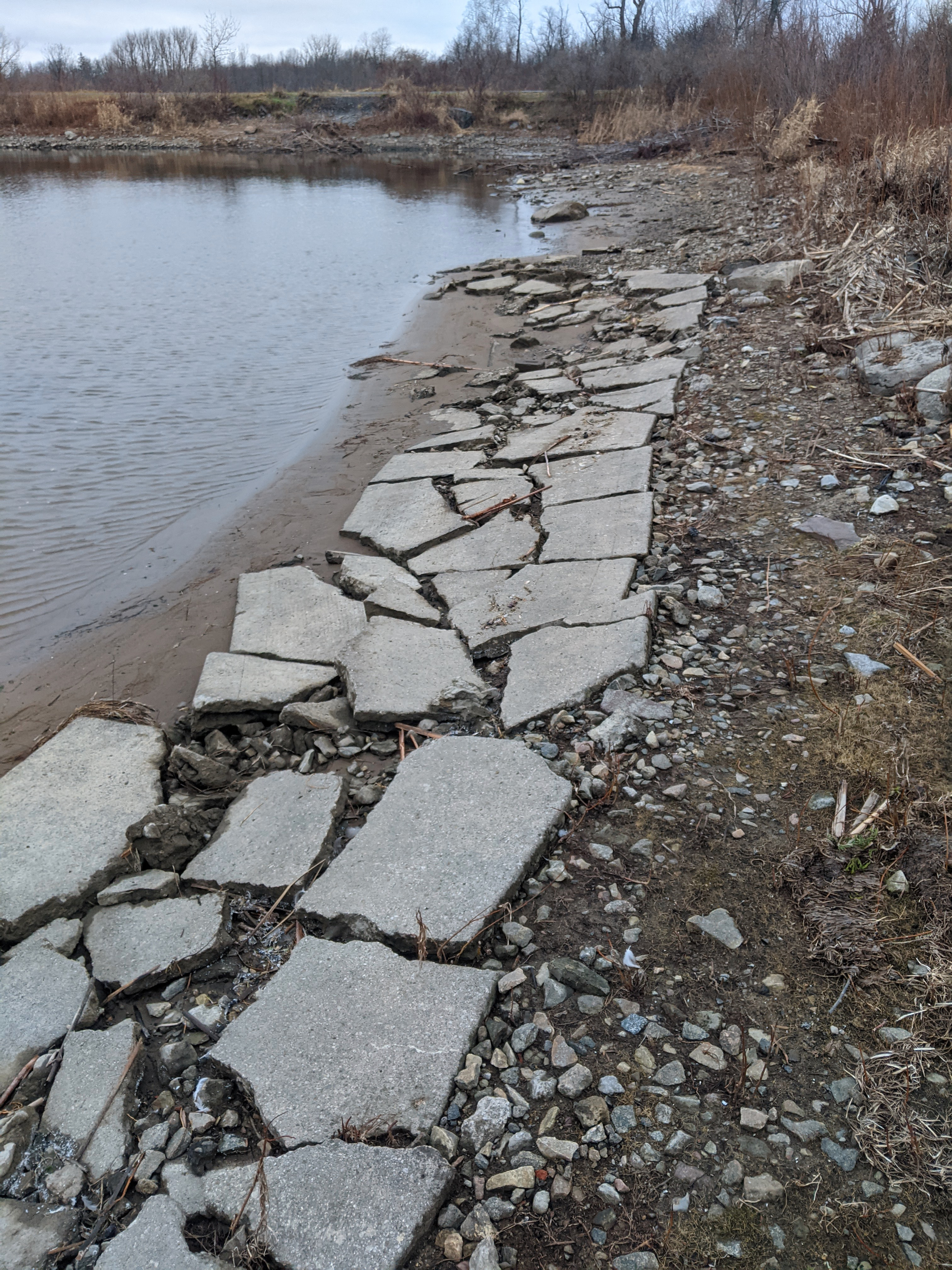
A broken chunk of a sidewalk from the former village of Aultsville, Ontario lying on the shore of the St. Lawrence River

The purpose of these created fires was to determine the survival of the occupants, spread by radiation, and ventilation rates; listed in the study as a, b, and c. The study was also used to validate evidence of time-temperature curves – normally used for performing fire resistance tests. The section under Survival of Occupants writes about whether or not noise of a fire would be useful to people upstairs in a house before the time in which survival would become unattainable. Smoke detectors were not common until the 1960s, and were used primarily in museums, art galleries, and electronic equipment protection.

Locally, the fires became known as the St. Lawrence Burns and were watched by spectators who once occupied the village. Aultsville's volunteer fire chief observed several of the burns, including that of his own home. According to George Hickey, who was a teacher at the local high school and considered somewhat of a local historian, not many of the residents were aware of the scheduled burns. For many, the burns were considered devastating to watch after already losing their homes to the Seaway.

The National Film Board of Canada filmed all of the controlled fires at Aultsville and produced a 20-minute documentary about them called Setting Fires For Science. Additionally, Donald Brittain wrote and directed a series of films called St. Lawrence Burns, No. 1–8 about the fires.

== Churches and burial grounds ==
At one point, Aultsville was home to three churches: an Anglican, a United and a Presbyterian church. The Anglican church was known as St. Paul's Anglican Church, with its congregation first being mentioned in the Synod journals in 1876. In 1887, a brick church was constructed to house the congregation. St. Paul's was consecrated by a Bishop Charles Hamilton on December 19, 1900. In 1925, the church was severely damaged by fire, but was rebuilt within a year. The church was demolished in 1958 in preparation for the flooding of the Seaway. St. Peter's church in the newly formed community of Ingleside was erected to replace it and a few other churches demolished at the time.

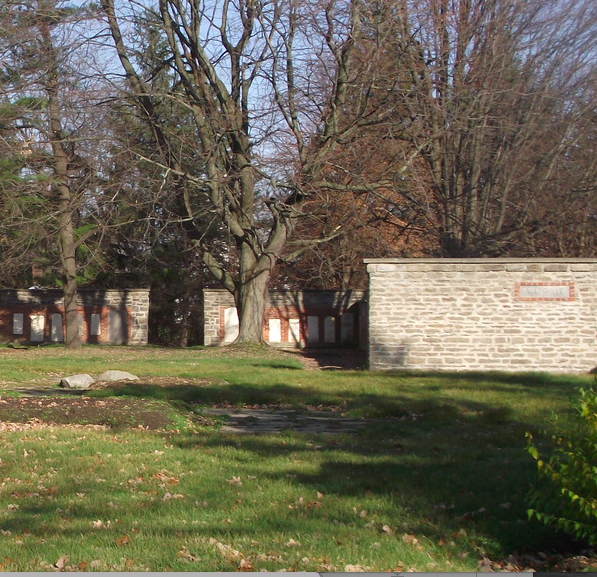
Sign indicating the Aultsville section of the pioneer memorial at Upper Canada Village.

The Presbyterian church in Aultsville was known as the Immanuel Presbyterian church. This church was constructed in 1899 and opened in February 1900. The church was demolished in 1957 in preparation for the flooding of the village; St. Matthew's Presbyterian Church in Ingleside was constructed to replace it. The United church was called the Trinity United Church and was a Methodist church located within the village. Like the other churches, it was also demolished in the 1950s in preparation for the Seaway's construction.

The United church, called Trinity United Church, had a cemetery located on its property simply referred to as the Old Burying Ground. The church was constructed in 1860 and was closed and demolished in 1957.

In the early years of the settlement until the 1900s, it was common for people to bury their dead on their property. According to local residents, grave robbing was a common problem in the village, with one individual in particular being known for padding his horse's hooves in order to sneak around fresh graves at night. It was also common practice to bury the dead with tins or other items that would produce a sound when disturbed.

Before the expansion of the St. Lawrence Seaway, Aultsville underwent a process to preserve its old burial sites. Detailed records of eroding grave markers were made. It was during this preservation time that researchers uncovered many birthplaces of former British Loyalists who migrated to Canada before and after the American Revolution. The tombstones and graves were moved from the village to be preserved, being encased into a brick wall and becoming part of the pioneer memorial located near Upper Canada Village. Other towns that had burial grounds preserved here included Dickinson's Landing, Farran's Point and Wales.

== Grand Trunk train station ==
Aultsville's train station was first a Grand Trunk Railway Inc. station located along the Grand Trunk line. The first station located here was built around 1856, the same year the railway opened. The original station was made of wood, and quickly became outgrown by the village. Some records indicate the building was used as an outbuilding for the new station. The second Aultsville station, which still stands, was built between 1866 and 1889. This station is a square, red building of wood construction, built based on blueprints supplied by the railway for their "Standard No. 1" chain of stations; the blueprints were slightly altered to suit the community. In 1923 the Grand Trunk Railway was saved by the government's absorption, better known as the Canadian National Railway (CNR); Aultsville station became a part of their estate in this year. In the 1930s, the station was partially rebuilt after a westbound train jumped the tracks, destroying the outbuildings and scraping the corner of the station.

During the 1950s Canadian National Railway relocated some of its track away from the rising flood waters. In preparation for the flooding of the Seaway, the building was donated to the St. Lawrence Parks Commission and moved to its current location. The train station now sits near Upper Canada Village along one of the only remaining original sections of railway from the Grand Trunk line left in its original place. In recent years the station has been home to a British Home Child exhibit.

== See also ==
- List of ghost towns in Ontario
- The Lost Villages
- South Stormont
