= Samuel Ault =

Canadian politician

Samuel Ault (December 11, 1814 – August 28, 1895) was an Ontario political figure. He was a Reformer member of the Legislative Assembly of the Province of Canada for Stormont from 1861 to 1867. He was a Liberal-Conservative member of the House of Commons of Canada representing Stormont from 1867 to 1872.

He was born in Osnabruck Township, Upper Canada in 1814, the son of Nicholas Ault, a United Empire Loyalist of German descent, and Margaret Ross. Ault married Catherine Valentine Loucks. With his brothers, he operated a general store, Ault Brothers Ltd., in the village of Charlesville, later renamed Aultsville in his honour. He served on the municipal council, later becoming reeve and then warden for the United Counties of Stormont, Dundas and Glengarry. Ault represented Stormont County in the Legislative Assembly of the Province of Canada from 1861 to 1867 and then in the House of Commons after Confederation. He was also a lieutenant in the local militia.

Aultsville was later submerged beneath the waters of the Saint Lawrence River when the Saint Lawrence Seaway was built.

1867 Canadian federal election: Stormont
Party	Candidate	Votes	%	±%
Liberal-Conservative	Samuel Ault	955	72.5	
Unknown	Sinclair	363	27.5	
Total valid votes		1,318		
Turnout (based on valid votes)		1,318	74.76	
Eligible voters		1,763		
Source: Elections Canada and Canada Elections Database

1872 Canadian federal election: Stormont
Party	Candidate	Votes	%	±%
Liberal	Cyril Archibald	828	51.1	
Liberal-Conservative	Samuel Ault	792	48.9	
Total valid votes		1,620		
Source: Elections Canada and Canada Elections Database

Parliament of Canada
Preceded by None	Member of Parliament for Stormont; 1867–1872	Succeeded by Cyril Archibald
