= Frank Thomas Shaver =

Canadian politician

Member of Parliament for Stormont
- In office July 1930 – October 1935
- Preceded by: Arnold Neilson Smith
- Succeeded by: Lionel Chevrier

Personal details
- Born: Frank Thomas Shaver; 10 February 1881 Osnabruck Centre, Ontario
- Died: 11 December 1969 (aged 88) Cornwall, Ontario
- Party: Conservative
- Spouse(s): Georgia M. Cross m. 14 November 1906
- Profession: Merchant

Frank Thomas Shaver (10 February 1881 – 11 December 1969) was a Conservative member of the House of Commons of Canada. He was born in Osnabruck Centre, Ontario and became a merchant. Shaver attended the Morrisburg Collegiate Institute. He was one of the principals of the Jarvis and Shaver General Store.

He was first elected to Parliament at the Stormont riding in the 1930 general election. After serving one term in the House of Commons, Shaver was defeated by Lionel Chevrier of the Liberal party in the 1935 federal election. Shaver made an unsuccessful bid as a Progressive Conservative to unseat Chevrier in the 1949 election.

He died at Cornwall General Hospital in 1969.

== Electoral record ==
1930 Canadian federal election: Stormont
Party	Candidate	Votes	%	±%
Conservative	Frank Thomas Shaver	7,901	51.9	
Liberal	Arnold Neilson Smith	7,326	48.1	
Total valid votes		15,227		
Turnout (based on valid votes; total votes not available)		15,227	86.06	
Eligible voters		17,649		
Source: Elections Canada and Canada Elections Database

1935 Canadian federal election: Stormont
Party	Candidate	Votes	%	±%
Liberal	Lionel Chevrier	9,233	54.7	
Conservative	Frank Thomas Shaver	6,655	39.5	
Reconstruction	Nathan Copeland	980	5.8	
Total valid votes		16,868		
Turnout (based on valid votes; total votes not available)		16,868	81.78	-4.28
Eligible voters		20.627		
Source: Elections Canada and Canada Elections Database
