= Cyril Archibald =

Canadian politician (1837–1914)

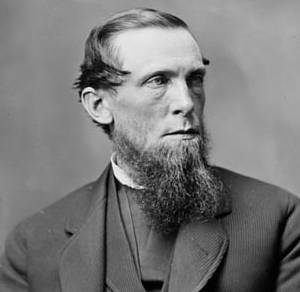
- Born: 1837; Osnabruck Township, Upper Canada
- Died: April 13, 1914 (aged 76–77); Northfield, Minnesota U.S.
- Education: Upper Canada College
- Occupations: politician and businessman
- Movement: Liberal Party of Canada

Cyril Archibald (1837 – April 13, 1914) was an Ontario politician. He represented Stormont in the House of Commons of Canada as a Liberal member from 1872 to 1878.

He was born in Osnabruck Township in Upper Canada in 1837, the son of John Archibald and Eliza Dixon. He was educated at Upper Canada College and served as a Lieutenant in No. 6 company of the 59th Stormont and Glengarry Battalion during the Fenian Raid of 1870. In 1881, he married Gertrude Wood. Archibald served as reeve of Osnabruck from 1866 to 1869. Archibald also served as paymaster for the local militia. In 1881, he went to Dundas, Minnesota, where he joined his brother Edward's flour milling business. He retired from that business in 1892 and moved to Northfield, Minnesota, where he died in 1914.

== Electoral record ==
1872 Canadian federal election: Stormont
Party	Candidate	Votes	%	±%
Liberal	Cyril Archibald	828	51.1	
Liberal-Conservative	Samuel Ault	792	48.9	
Total valid votes		1,620		
Source: Elections Canada and Canada Elections Database

1874 Canadian federal election: Stormont
Party	Candidate	Votes	%	±%
Liberal	Cyril Archibald	905	53.2	
Unknown	J. Crysler	797	46.8	
Total valid votes		1,702		
Turnout (based on valid votes)		1,702	78.54	
Eligible voters		2,167		
Source: Elections Canada and Canada Elections Database

1878 Canadian federal election: Stormont
Party	Candidate	Votes	%	±%
Conservative	Oscar Fulton	1,082	55.0	
Liberal	Cyril Archibald	885	45.0	
Total valid votes		1,967		
Total rejected ballots		66		
Turnout		2,033	79.66	+1.12
Eligible voters		2,552		
Source: Elections Canada and Canada Elections Database

Parliament of Canada
Preceded by Samuel Ault	Member of Parliament for Stormont; 1872–1878	Succeeded by Oscar Fulton
