= Duncan Orestes Alguire =

Canadian politician

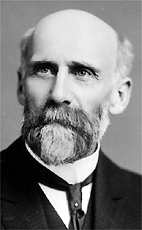

Member of Parliament for Stormont
- In office 1911–1917
- Preceded by: Robert Smith
- Succeeded by: Charles James Hamilton

Personal details
- Born: August 13, 1853 Cornwall Township, Canada West
- Died: May 4, 1925 (aged 71)
- Party: Conservative
- Profession: physician

Duncan Orestes Algyure (August 13, 1853 in Cornwall Township, Canada West – May 4, 1925) was a Canadian politician and physician. He graduated in medicine from McGill University in 1873. He was a member of the historical Conservative Party of Canada between November 15, 1911 and October 6, 1917 representing the riding of Stormont in the House of Commons of Canada after being elected on September 21, 1911.

== Electoral record ==
1911 Canadian federal election: Stormont
Party	Candidate	Votes	%	±%
Conservative	Duncan Orestes Alguire	2,539	51.3	
Liberal	George Ira Gogo	2,408	48.7	
Total valid votes		4,947		
Source: Elections Canada and Canada Elections Database
