= Robert Smith (Canadian judge) =

Canadian politician

The Honourable Robert Smith
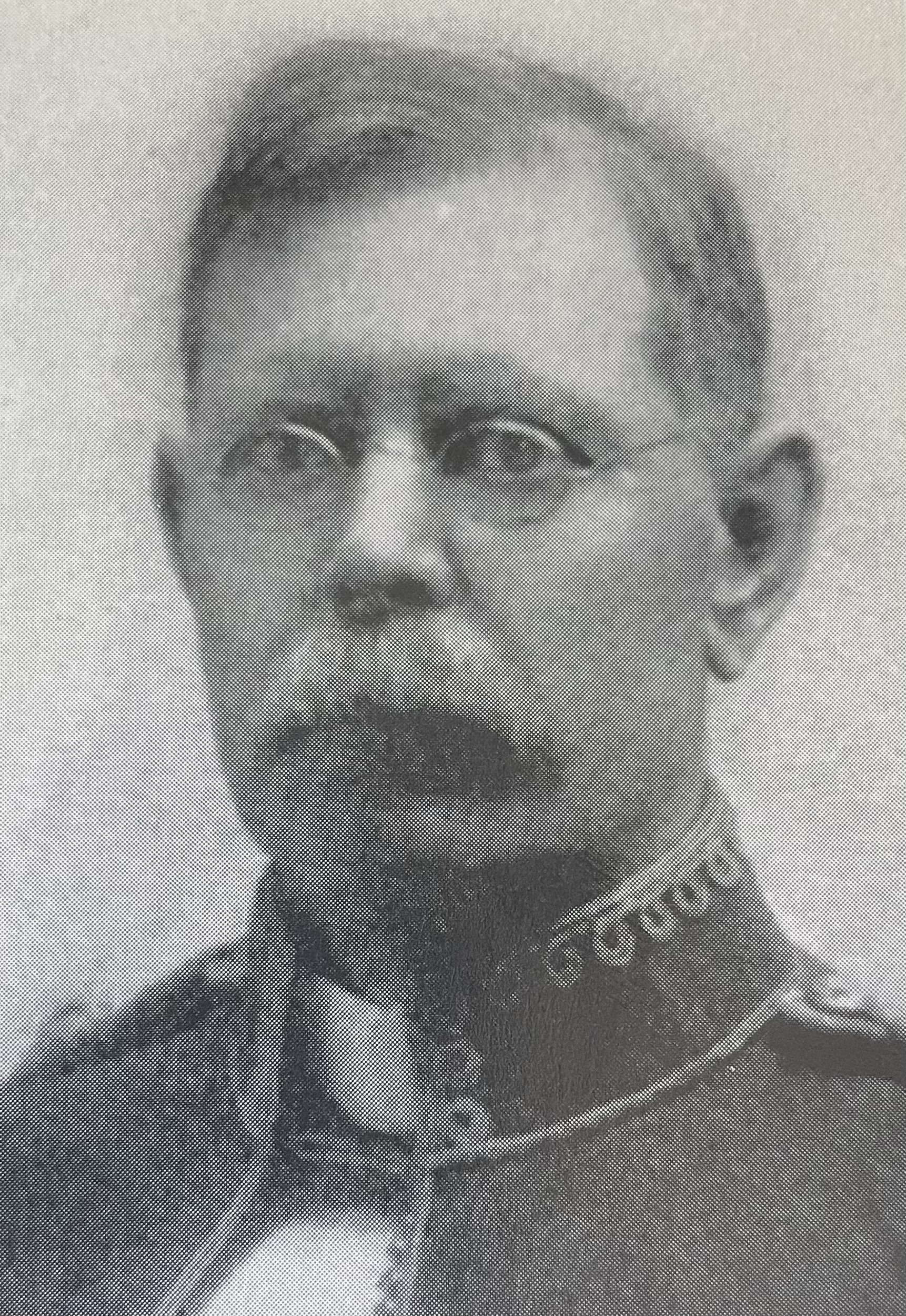

Puisne Justice of the Supreme Court of Canada
- In office May 18, 1927 – December 6, 1933
- Nominated by: William Lyon Mackenzie King
- Preceded by: None (new position)
- Succeeded by: Henry Hague Davis

Member of the Canadian Parliament for Stormont
- In office January 20, 1909 – July 29, 1911
- Preceded by: Robert Abercrombie Pringle
- Succeeded by: Duncan Orestes Alguire

Personal details
- Born: December 7, 1858 Ramsay Township, Canada West
- Died: March 18, 1942 (aged 83) Ottawa, Ontario, Canada
- Party: Liberal
- Children: Arnold Neilson Smith

Military service
- Allegiance: Canadian Militia
- Years of service: 1897 - 1910
- Rank: Captain; Lieutenant Colonel
- Unit: 59th Stormont and Glengarry Regiment (1897-1908)
- Commands: 59th Stormont and Glengarry Regiment (1908-1910)

Robert Smith (December 7, 1858 – March 18, 1942) was a Canadian lawyer, politician and puisne justice of the Supreme Court of Canada.

== Early life ==
Born in Lanark County, Canada West (now Ontario), the son of William Smith and Jean Neilson, he was educated in Almonte and at Osgoode Hall. He was called to the Ontario Bar in 1885. He then practiced law in Cornwall, Ontario.

In 1888, Smith married Florence Parker Pettit.

Smith joined the 59th Stormont and Glengarry Regiment on May 28, 1897 and commanded the regiment as Lieutenant Colonel from 1908 to April 11, 1910.

== Political life ==
In 1904, he ran for the House of Commons of Canada as a Liberal in the riding of Stormont, Ontario. He lost but won in 1908. He did not run for re-election.

== Legal and business life ==
In 1908, Smith was named King's Counsel. Smith was a director and secretary-treasurer for the Montreal and Cornwall Navigation Company. He served as lieutenant-colonel in the militia.

In 1922, he was appointed to the High Court Division of the Supreme Court of Ontario and then to the Appellate Division in 1924. His appointment to the bench was a combination of his abilities and Liberal patronage. In 1926, Smith served as an ad hoc justice of the Supreme Court of Canada.

== Justice of the Supreme Court of Canada ==
On May 18, 1927, Prime Minister William Lyon Mackenzie King appointed Smith to the newly created seventh seat on the Supreme Court at the age of 67. His appointment was based on his legal skill, his respected standing at the Ontario bar, and pressure from his son, Arnold Neilson Smith, who had been elected to the House of Commons in 1926. Smith tried to negotiate a special pension as part of the appointment but accepted only a vague government promise to provide for him in retirement.

For reasons unknown, the federal government took over a year to appoint a replacement for Justice Smith, eventually appointing Henry Hague Davis in 1935.

== Later life ==
Smith died in Ottawa at the age of 83.

== Electoral record ==
1904 Canadian federal election: Stormont
Party	Candidate	Votes	%	±%
Conservative	Robert Abercrombie Pringle	2,700	51.0	
Liberal	Robert Smith	2,589	49.0	
Total valid votes		5,289		
Total rejected ballots		45		
Turnout		5,334	76.3	
Eligible voters		6,991		
Source: Elections Canada and Canada Elections Database

1908 Canadian federal election: Stormont
Party	Candidate	Votes	%	±%
Liberal	Robert Smith	2,383	47.0	
Conservative	Robert Abercrombie Pringle	2,033	40.0	
Independent	Ambrose Fitzgerald Mulhern	658	13.0	
Total valid votes		5,074		
Total rejected ballots		48		
Turnout		5,122	72.26	-4.04
Eligible voters		7,088		
Source: Elections Canada and Canada Elections Database
