= Charles James Hamilton =

Canadian politician

Member of Parliament for Stormont
- In office October 1925 – September 1926
- Preceded by: Duncan Orestes Alguire
- Succeeded by: Arnold Neilson Smith

Personal details
- Born: Charles James Hamilton; 15 September 1855 Goderich, Canada West
- Died: 19 December 1937 (aged 82)
- Party: Conservative
- Spouse(s): 1) Harriet S. Dickinson m. 22 December 1880 (died); 2) Helen Cline
- Profession: physician

Charles James Hamilton (15 September 1855 – 19 December 1937) was a Conservative member of the House of Commons of Canada. He was born in Goderich, Canada West and became a physician.

Hamilton was elected to Parliament at the Stormont riding in the 1925 general election. After serving one term in the 15th Canadian Parliament, he was defeated by Arnold Neilson Smith of the Liberals in the 1926 election.

Hamilton served as a reeve of Cornwall Township at one time. He was a municipal councillor for Cornwall, Ontario in 1884 and served as that city's mayor in 1889 and 1894.

1925 Canadian federal election: Stormont
Party	Candidate	Votes	%	±%
Conservative	Charles James Hamilton	5,706	51.4	
Liberal	George Ira Gogo	5,394	48.6	
Total valid votes		11,100		
Turnout (based on valid votes; total votes not available)		11,100	71.96	
Eligible voters		15,426		
Source: Elections Canada and Canada Elections Database

1926 Canadian federal election: Stormont
Party	Candidate	Votes	%	±%
Liberal	Arnold Neilson Smith	6,623	52.1	
Conservative	Charles James Hamilton	6,083	47.9	
Total valid votes		12,706		
Source: Elections Canada and Canada Elections Database
