= Stormont (federal electoral district) =

Former federal electoral district in Ontario, Canada

Ontario electoral district

Defunct federal electoral district
- Legislature: House of Commons
- District created: 1867, 1903, 1924
- District abolished: 1882, 1914, 1966
- First contested: 1867
- Last contested: 1965

Stormont was a federal electoral district represented in the House of Commons of Canada from 1867 to 1882, 1904 to 1917, and 1925 to 1968. It was located in the eastern part of the province of Ontario.

It was created by the British North America Act 1867 as consisting of Stormont County. It was abolished in 1882 when it was merged with Cornwall riding into Cornwall and Stormont.

It was re-created as a separate riding in 1903, consisting again of Stormont County. It was abolished in 1914 when it was redistributed between Dundas and Glengarry and Stormont ridings.

It was re-created as a separate riding again in 1924 consisting again of Stormont County. In 1947, it was redefined to consist of the county of Stormont, including the city of Cornwall.

The electoral district was abolished in 1966 when it was merged into Stormont—Dundas riding.

== Members of Parliament ==
This riding elected the following members of the House of Commons of Canada:

Parliament	Years	Member	Party
1st	1867–1872	Samuel Ault	Liberal–Conservative
2nd	1872–1874	Cyril Archibald	Liberal
3rd	1874–1878	Cyril Archibald	Liberal
4th	1878–1882	Oscar Fulton	Liberal–Conservative
Riding dissolved into Cornwall and Stormont
Riding re-created from Cornwall and Stormont
10th	1904–1908	Robert Abercrombie Pringle	Conservative
11th	1908–1911	Robert Smith	Liberal
12th	1911–1917	Duncan Orestes Alguire	Conservative
Riding dissolved into Glengarry and Stormont and Dundas
Riding re-created from Glengarry and Stormont and Dundas
15th	1925–1926	Charles James Hamilton	Conservative
16th	1926–1930	Arnold Neilson Smith	Liberal
17th	1930–1935	Frank Thomas Shaver	Conservative
18th	1935–1940	Lionel Chevrier	Liberal
19th	1940–1945	Lionel Chevrier	Liberal
20th	1945–1949	Lionel Chevrier	Liberal
21st	1949–1953	Lionel Chevrier	Liberal
22nd	1953–1954	Lionel Chevrier	Liberal
22nd	1954–1957	Albert Lavigne	Liberal
23rd	1957–1958	Albert Lavigne	Liberal
24th	1958–1962	Grant Campbell	Progressive Conservative
25th	1962–1963	Lucien Lamoureux	Liberal
26th	1963–1965	Lucien Lamoureux	Liberal
27th	1965–1968	Lucien Lamoureux	Liberal
Riding dissolved into Stormont—Dundas

== Election results ==
=== 1867–1882 ===
1867 Canadian federal election
Party	Candidate	Votes	%	±%
Liberal-Conservative	Samuel Ault	955	72.5	
Unknown	Sinclair	363	27.5	
Total valid votes		1,318		
Turnout (based on valid votes)		1,318	74.76	
Eligible voters		1,763		
Source: Elections Canada and Canada Elections Database

Result by municipality

Municipality	Ault	Sinclair	Total vote	Eligible voters
Finch Township	231	64	295	399
Roxborough Township	107	206	313	421
Osnabruck Township	617	93	710	943
Total	955	363	1,318	1,763

1872 Canadian federal election
Party	Candidate	Votes	%	±%
Liberal	Cyril Archibald	828	51.1	
Liberal-Conservative	Samuel Ault	792	48.9	
Total valid votes		1,620		
Source: Elections Canada and Canada Elections Database

1874 Canadian federal election
Party	Candidate	Votes	%	±%
Liberal	Cyril Archibald	905	53.2	
Unknown	J. Crysler	797	46.8	
Total valid votes		1,702		
Turnout (based on valid votes)		1,702	78.54	
Eligible voters		2,167		
Source: Elections Canada and Canada Elections Database

1878 Canadian federal election
Party	Candidate	Votes	%	±%
Conservative	Oscar Fulton	1,082	55.0	
Liberal	Cyril Archibald	885	45.0	
Total valid votes		1,967		
Total rejected ballots		66		
Turnout		2,033	79.66	+1.12
Eligible voters		2,552		
Source: Elections Canada and Canada Elections Database

=== 1904–1917 ===
1904 Canadian federal election
Party	Candidate	Votes	%	±%
Conservative	Robert Abercrombie Pringle	2,700	51.0	
Liberal	Robert Smith	2,589	49.0	
Total valid votes		5,289		
Total rejected ballots		45		
Turnout		5,334	76.3	
Eligible voters		6,991		
Source: Elections Canada and Canada Elections Database

1908 Canadian federal election
Party	Candidate	Votes	%	±%
Liberal	Robert Smith	2,383	47.0	
Conservative	Robert Abercrombie Pringle	2,033	40.0	
Independent	Ambrose Fitzgerald Mulhern	658	13.0	
Total valid votes		5,074		
Total rejected ballots		48		
Turnout		5,122	72.26	-4.04
Eligible voters		7,088		
Source: Elections Canada and Canada Elections Database

1911 Canadian federal election
Party	Candidate	Votes	%	±%
Conservative	Duncan Orestes Alguire	2,539	51.3	
Liberal	George Ira Gogo	2,408	48.7	
Total valid votes		4,947		
Source: Elections Canada and Canada Elections Database

=== 1925–1968 ===
1925 Canadian federal election
Party	Candidate	Votes	%	±%
Conservative	Charles James Hamilton	5,706	51.4	
Liberal	George Ira Gogo	5,394	48.6	
Total valid votes		11,100		
Turnout (based on valid votes; total votes not available)		11,100	71.96	
Eligible voters		15,426		
Source: Elections Canada and Canada Elections Database

1926 Canadian federal election
Party	Candidate	Votes	%	±%
Liberal	Arnold Neilson Smith	6,623	52.1	
Conservative	Charles James Hamilton	6,083	47.9	
Total valid votes		12,706		
Source: Elections Canada and Canada Elections Database

1930 Canadian federal election
Party	Candidate	Votes	%	±%
Conservative	Frank Thomas Shaver	7,901	51.9	
Liberal	Arnold Neilson Smith	7,326	48.1	
Total valid votes		15,227		
Turnout (based on valid votes; total votes not available)		15,227	86.06	
Eligible voters		17,649		
Source: Elections Canada and Canada Elections Database

1935 Canadian federal election
Party	Candidate	Votes	%	±%
Liberal	Lionel Chevrier	9,233	54.7	
Conservative	Frank Thomas Shaver	6,655	39.5	
Reconstruction	Nathan Copeland	980	5.8	
Total valid votes		16,868		
Turnout (based on valid votes; total votes not available)		16,868	81.78	-4.28
Eligible voters		20.627		
Source: Elections Canada and Canada Elections Database

1940 Canadian federal election
Party	Candidate	Votes	%	±%
Liberal	Lionel Chevrier	10,197	62.2	
National Government	Elzéar Emard	6,202	37.8	
Total valid votes		16,399		
Turnout (based on valid votes; total votes not available)		16,399	70.98	-10.8
Eligible voters		23,103		
Source: Elections Canada and Canada Elections Database

1945 Canadian federal election
Party	Candidate	Votes	%	±%
Liberal	Lionel Chevrier	11,702	62.5	
Progressive Conservative	John Allan Phillips	6,016	32.2	
Co-operative Commonwealth	John Charles Steer	991	5.3	
Total valid votes		18,709		
Turnout (based on valid votes; total votes not available)		18,709	79.19	+8.21
Eligible voters		23,624		
Source: Elections Canada and Canada Elections Database

1949 Canadian federal election
Party	Candidate	Votes	%	±%
Liberal	Lionel Chevrier	12,639	60.6	
Progressive Conservative	Frank Thomas Shaver	6,670	32.0	
Co-operative Commonwealth	Alexander Francis Mullin	1,283	6.2	
Union of Electors	Lucien St-Amour	252	1.2	
Total valid votes		20,844		
Total rejected ballots		292		
Turnout		21,136	80.13	+0.94
Eligible voters		26,377		
Source: Elections Canada and Canada Elections Database

1953 Canadian federal election
Party	Candidate	Votes	%	±%
Liberal	Lionel Chevrier	13,503	65.1	
Progressive Conservative	John Lawrence McDonald	7,244	34.9	
Total valid votes		20,747		
Total rejected ballots		252		
Turnout		20,999	76.12	-4.01
Eligible voters		27,587		
Source: Elections Canada and Canada Elections Database

Canadian federal by-election, 8 November 1954 Lionel Chevrier appointed President of the Saint Lawrence Seaway Authority on 1 July 1954
Party	Candidate	Votes	%	±%
Liberal	Albert Lavigne	11,441	50.8	
Progressive Conservative	Donald Robert Dick	11,091	49.2	
Total valid votes		22,532		
Total rejected ballots		235		
Turnout		22,767	80.48	+4.36
Eligible voters		28,290		
Source: Elections Canada and Cornwall Standard-Freeholder

1957 Canadian federal election
Party	Candidate	Votes	%	±%
Liberal	Albert Lavigne	12,505	53.5	
Progressive Conservative	Grant Campbell	10,215	43.7	
Social Credit	Melvin Andrew Rowat	646	2.8	
Total valid votes		23,366		
Total rejected ballots		305		
Turnout		23,671	75.24	-5.24
Eligible voters		31,462		
Source: Elections Canada and Canada Elections Database

1958 Canadian federal election
Party	Candidate	Votes	%	±%
Progressive Conservative	Grant Campbell	13,964	53.1	
Liberal	Albert Lavigne	11,977	45.6	
Social Credit	Melvin Andrew Rowat	331	1.3	
Total valid votes		26,272		
Total rejected ballots		345		
Turnout		26,617	83.53	+8.29
Eligible voters		31,866		
Source: Elections Canada, Canada Elections Database, and Cornwall Standard-Freeholder

1962 Canadian federal election
Party	Candidate	Votes	%	±%
Liberal	Lucien Lamoureux	11,363	45.7	
Progressive Conservative	Grant Campbell	11,293	45.4	
Social Credit	Melvin Andrew Rowat	1,256	5.1	
New Democratic	Marjorie Ball	946	3.8	
Total valid votes		24,858		
Turnout (based on valid votes; total votes not available)		24,858	80.54	-2.99
Eligible voters		30,866		
Note: Due to the death of Albert Lavigne, the Liberal candidate for the riding of Stormont, on June 5, 1962, the general election scheduled for June 18, 1962 was postponed in this riding until July 16, 1962.
Source: Elections Canada and Canada Elections Database

1963 Canadian federal election
Party	Candidate	Votes	%	±%
Liberal	Lucien Lamoureux	13,285	53.9	
Progressive Conservative	John Alguire	9,728	39.4	
Social Credit	Ludger Boileau	851	3.5	
New Democratic	Bill Kilger	801	3.2	
Total valid votes		24,665		
Turnout (based on valid votes; total votes not available)		24,665	80.3	-0.24
Eligible voters		30,716		
Source: Elections Canada and the Canada Elections Database

1965 Canadian federal election
Party	Candidate	Votes	%	±%
Liberal	Lucien Lamoureux	13,530	56.0	
Progressive Conservative	Ken Bergeron	7,458	30.8	
New Democratic	John B. Trew	3,201	13.2	
Total valid votes		24,189		
Total rejected ballots		215		
Turnout		24,404	78.66	-1.64
Eligible voters		31,025		
Source: Elections Canada and Canada Elections Database

== See also ==
- List of Canadian electoral districts
- Historical federal electoral districts of Canada
