= Albert Lavigne =

Canadian politician

Albert Peter Lavigne

Member of Parliament for Stormont
- In office November 1954 – March 1958
- Preceded by: Lionel Chevrier
- Succeeded by: Grant Campbell

Personal details
- Born: Albert Peter Lavigne; 9 October 1908 Cornwall, Ontario, Canada
- Died: 5 June 1962 (aged 53)
- Party: Liberal
- Profession: retail merchant

Albert Peter Lavigne (9 October 1908 – 5 June 1962) was a Canadian businessman and politician. Lavigne was a Liberal party member of the House of Commons of Canada. He was born in Cornwall, Ontario and became a retail merchant by career.

He was first elected at the Stormont riding in a by-election on 8 November 1954, then re-elected there in the 1957 federal election. He was defeated in the 1958 election by Grant Campbell of the Progressive Conservative party after serving his only full federal term, the 23rd Canadian Parliament.

== Electoral record ==
By-election: On Mr. Chevrier being appointed President of the Saint Lawrence Seaway Authority, 8 November 1954: Stormont
Party	Candidate	Votes	%	±%
Liberal	Albert Lavigne	11,441		
Progressive Conservative	Donald Robert Dick	11,091		

1957 Canadian federal election: Stormont
Party	Candidate	Votes	%	±%
Liberal	Albert Lavigne	12,505	53.5	
Progressive Conservative	Grant Campbell	10,215	43.7	
Social Credit	Melvin Andrew Rowat	646	2.8	
Total valid votes		23,366		
Total rejected ballots		305		
Turnout		23,671	75.24	-5.24
Eligible voters		31,462		
Source: Elections Canada and Canada Elections Database

1958 Canadian federal election: Stormont
Party	Candidate	Votes	%	±%
Progressive Conservative	Grant Campbell	13,964	53.1	
Liberal	Albert Lavigne	11,977	45.6	
Social Credit	Melvin Andrew Rowat	331	1.3	
Total valid votes		26,272		
Total rejected ballots		345		
Turnout		26,617	83.53	+8.29
Eligible voters		31,866		
Source: Elections Canada, Canada Elections Database, and Cornwall Standard-Freeholder
