= Arnold Neilson Smith =

Canadian politician

Member of Parliament for Stormont
- In office September 1926 – May 1930
- Preceded by: Charles James Hamilton
- Succeeded by: Frank Thomas Shaver

Personal details
- Born: Arnold Neilson Smith; 8 June 1889 Cornwall, Ontario, Canada
- Died: 24 July 1957 (aged 68)
- Party: Liberal
- Spouse(s): Jane Bates m. 15 September 1914
- Parent: Robert Smith (father)
- Profession: shipowner

Arnold Neilson Smith (8 June 1889 – 24 July 1957) was a member of the Liberal party who served in the House of Commons of Canada. Born in Cornwall, Ontario, Smith was a shipowner by profession.

Smith attended public and secondary schools at Cornwall. He was active in various roles, including serving as president of the Cornwall Board of Trade and of Stuebing Lift Truck Systems Ltd. He also held the positions of president and manager of the Montreal and Cornwall Navigation Company. Additionally, Smith served as a Life-Governor Cornwall General Hospital and as Deputy Chief Commissioner of the Liquor Control Board of Ontario.

He was first elected to Parliament at the Stormont riding in the 1926 general election. He served one term before being defeated by Frank Thomas Shaver of the Conservatives in the 1930 federal election.

Supreme Court historians Snell and Vaughan note that Smith lobbied for the appointment of his father Robert Smith to the Supreme Court of Canada after he was elected to parliament in 1926.

== Electoral record ==
1926 Canadian federal election: Stormont
Party	Candidate	Votes	%	±%
Liberal	Arnold Neilson Smith	6,623	52.1	
Conservative	Charles James Hamilton	6,083	47.9	
Total valid votes		12,706		
Source: Elections Canada and Canada Elections Database

1930 Canadian federal election: Stormont
Party	Candidate	Votes	%	±%
Conservative	Frank Thomas Shaver	7,901	51.9	
Liberal	Arnold Neilson Smith	7,326	48.1	
Total valid votes		15,227		
Turnout (based on valid votes; total votes not available)		15,227	86.06	
Eligible voters		17,649		
Source: Elections Canada and Canada Elections Database
