= Lionel Chevrier =

Canadian Member of Parliament

The Honourable Lionel Chevrier PC CC QC
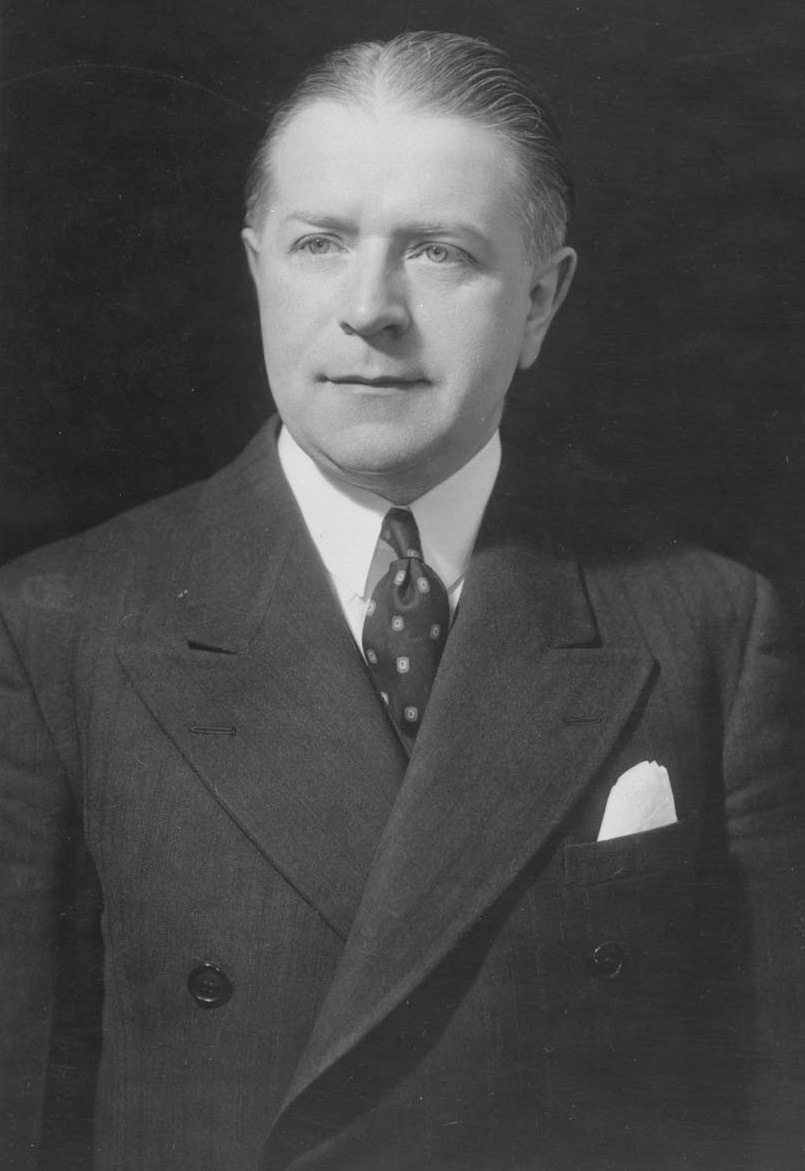
- Chevrier in 1945

Canadian High Commissioner to the United Kingdom
- In office February 6, 1964 – March 30, 1967
- Prime Minister: Lester B. Pearson
- Preceded by: George A. Drew
- Succeeded by: Charles Ritchie

Minister of Justice Attorney General of Canada
- In office April 22, 1963 – February 2, 1964
- Prime Minister: Lester B. Pearson
- Preceded by: Donald Fleming
- Succeeded by: Guy Favreau

President of the Privy Council
- In office April 25, 1957 – June 20, 1957
- Prime Minister: Louis St. Laurent
- Preceded by: Louis St. Laurent
- Succeeded by: John Diefenbaker

Minister of Transport
- In office April 18, 1945 – June 30, 1954
- Prime Minister: W. L. Mackenzie King; Louis St. Laurent
- Preceded by: Joseph-Enoil Michaud
- Succeeded by: George Carlyle Marler

Member of Parliament for Laurier
- In office June 10, 1957 – December 27, 1963
- Preceded by: J.-Eugène Lefrançois
- Succeeded by: Fernand Leblanc

Member of Parliament for Stormont
- In office October 14, 1935 – June 30, 1954
- Preceded by: Frank Thomas Shaver
- Succeeded by: Albert Lavigne

Personal details
- Born: April 2, 1903 Cornwall, Ontario, Canada
- Died: July 8, 1987 (aged 84) Montreal, Quebec, Canada
- Party: Liberal
- Profession: Diplomat; Barrister; Solicitor; Lawyer; Counsel; High Commissioner; Ambassador

Lionel Chevrier PC CC QC (April 2, 1903 – July 8, 1987) was a Canadian politician who was a Member of Parliament and cabinet minister.

== Life and career ==
Born in Cornwall, Ontario, the son of former Cornwall mayor Joseph E. Chevrier, he was educated in Cornwall, at the University of Ottawa, the University of Montreal and Osgoode Hall. Chevrier was called to the bar in 1928 and was named King's Counsel in 1939. He married Lucienne Brûlé in 1932. He was first elected as a Liberal candidate in the Ontario riding of Stormont in the 1935 federal election. He was re-elected in the 1940, 1945, 1949, and 1953 elections. He resigned in 1954, when he was appointed the first president of the Saint Lawrence Seaway Authority. Returning to politics, he was elected in the 1957 election in the Quebec riding of Laurier. He was re-elected in the 1958, 1962, and 1963 elections.

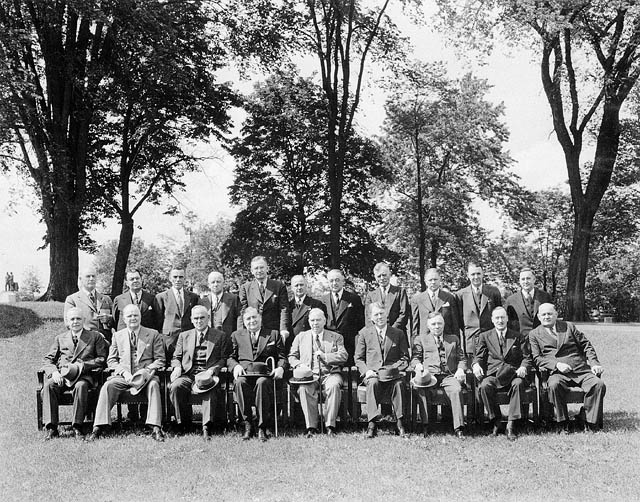
Lionel Chevrier and colleagues in the 16th Canadian Ministry (Rear, L-R): Hons. J. J. McCann, Paul Martin, Joseph Jean, J. A. Glen, Brooke Claxton, Alphonse Fournier, Ernest Bertrand, A. G. L. McNaughton, Lionel Chevrier, D. C. Abbott, D. L. MacLaren Date

From 1943 to 1945, he was Parliamentary Assistant to the Minister of Munitions and Supply. From 1945 to 1954, he was the Minister of Transport. He was President of the Privy Council from April 25, 1957 to June 20, 1957. From 1963 to 1964, he was the Minister of Justice and Attorney General of Canada. From 1957 to 1963, he was the Official Opposition House Leader and Liberal Party House Leader.

He resigned from the House of Commons in 1964 to become the Canadian High Commissioner in London. He held that position until 1967.

Chevrier served as the Honorary Lieutenant Colonel of the Stormont, Dundas and Glengarry Highlanders from 1948 - 1956 and as Honorary Colonel from 1956 - 1961.

In 1967, he was made a Companion of the Order of Canada. In 1997, Canada Post issued a stamp in his honour.

1935 Canadian federal election: Stormont
Party	Candidate	Votes	%	±%
Liberal	Lionel Chevrier	9,233	54.7	
Conservative	Frank Thomas Shaver	6,655	39.5	
Reconstruction	Nathan Copeland	980	5.8	
Total valid votes		16,868		
Turnout (based on valid votes; total votes not available)		16,868	81.78	-4.28
Eligible voters		20.627		
Source: Elections Canada and Canada Elections Database

1940 Canadian federal election: Stormont
Party	Candidate	Votes	%	±%
Liberal	Lionel Chevrier	10,197	62.2	
National Government	Elzéar Emard	6,202	37.8	
Total valid votes		16,399		
Turnout (based on valid votes; total votes not available)		16,399	70.98	-10.8
Eligible voters		23,103		
Source: Elections Canada and Canada Elections Database

1945 Canadian federal election: Stormont
Party	Candidate	Votes	%	±%
Liberal	Lionel Chevrier	11,702	62.5	
Progressive Conservative	John Allan Phillips	6,016	32.2	
Co-operative Commonwealth	John Charles Steer	991	5.3	
Total valid votes		18,709		
Turnout (based on valid votes; total votes not available)		18,709	79.19	+8.21
Eligible voters		23,624		
Source: Elections Canada and Canada Elections Database

1949 Canadian federal election: Stormont
Party	Candidate	Votes	%	±%
Liberal	Lionel Chevrier	12,639	60.6	
Progressive Conservative	Frank Thomas Shaver	6,670	32.0	
Co-operative Commonwealth	Alexander Francis Mullin	1,283	6.2	
Union of Electors	Lucien St-Amour	252	1.2	
Total valid votes		20,844		
Total rejected ballots		292		
Turnout		21,136	80.13	+0.94
Eligible voters		26,377		
Source: Elections Canada and Canada Elections Database

1953 Canadian federal election: Stormont
Party	Candidate	Votes	%	±%
Liberal	Lionel Chevrier	13,503	65.1	
Progressive Conservative	John Lawrence McDonald	7,244	34.9	
Total valid votes		20,747		
Total rejected ballots		252		
Turnout		20,999	76.12	-4.01
Eligible voters		27,587		
Source: Elections Canada and Canada Elections Database

Political offices
Preceded by Joseph Enoil Michaud	Minister of Transport; 1945–1954	Succeeded by George Carlyle Marler
Preceded by Louis St. Laurent	President of the Privy Council; 1957	Vacant
Preceded by Donald Fleming	Minister of Justice; 1963–1964	Succeeded by Guy Favreau
