= Robert Abercrombie Pringle =

Canadian politician

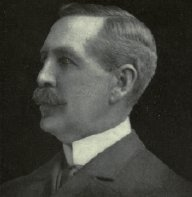

Member of the Canadian Parliament for Stormont
- In office 1904–1908
- Preceded by: District was created in 1903
- Succeeded by: Robert Smith

Member of the Canadian Parliament for Cornwall and Stormont
- In office 1900–1904
- Preceded by: John Goodall Snetsinger
- Succeeded by: District was abolished in 1903

Personal details
- Born: 15 December 1855 Cornwall, Canada West
- Died: 9 January 1922 (aged 66)
- Party: Liberal

Military service
- Allegiance: Canada
- Branch/service: Canadian militia
- Years of service: 1877 - 1879
- Rank: Lieutenant
- Unit: 59th Stormont and Glengarry Battalion

Robert Abercrombie Pringle (15 December 1855 – 9 January 1922) was a Canadian lawyer and politician.

Born in Cornwall, Canada West, the son of Jacob Farrand Pringle and Isabella Fraser, (daughter of Col. Alexander Fraser), Pringle was educated in public and high schools and Queen's University. A lawyer, he was treasurer of the town of Cornwall. A Conservative in politics, he served in the House of Commons from 1900 to 1908.

He was elected to the House of Commons of Canada for Cornwall and Stormont in the 1900 federal election. A Conservative, he was re-elected in the 1904 election but was defeated in 1908.

During the 1907 financial panic, Pringle wrote a criticism of the Canadian banking System. Another MP, banker Robert Bickerdike, took him to task, and put such pressure on him through negative articles in the media of the time that Pringle backed down. The next time the bank charters were renewed, instead of addressing the laxness of regulation that had led to the panic, several changes were made to suit the bankers.(The later collapse of the Home Bank demonstrated the need for tightening of regulation of the banks.)

== Electoral record ==
1904 Canadian federal election: Stormont
Party	Candidate	Votes	%	±%
Conservative	Robert Abercrombie Pringle	2,700	51.0	
Liberal	Robert Smith	2,589	49.0	
Total valid votes		5,289		
Total rejected ballots		45		
Turnout		5,334	76.3	
Eligible voters		6,991		
Source: Elections Canada and Canada Elections Database

1908 Canadian federal election: Stormont
Party	Candidate	Votes	%	±%
Liberal	Robert Smith	2,383	47.0	
Conservative	Robert Abercrombie Pringle	2,033	40.0	
Independent	Ambrose Fitzgerald Mulhern	658	13.0	
Total valid votes		5,074		
Total rejected ballots		48		
Turnout		5,122	72.26	-4.04
Eligible voters		7,088		
Source: Elections Canada and Canada Elections Database
