= 4th Parliament of Upper Canada =

Parliament for Upper Canada 1805–1808

The 4th Parliament of Upper Canada was opened 1 February 1805. Elections in Upper Canada had been held in May 1804. All sessions were held at Parliament Buildings of Upper Canada in York, Upper Canada. This parliament was dissolved 21 May 1808.

This House of Assembly of the 4th Parliament of Upper Canada had four sessions 1 February 1805 to 16 March 1808:

Sessions	Start	End
1st	1 February 1805	2 March 1805
2nd	4 February 1806	3 March 1806
3rd	2 February 1807	10 March 1807
4th	20 January 1808	16 March 1808

== Members ==
Riding	Member	First elected/ previously elected	No. of terms
Dundas	John Crysler	1804	1st term
Durham, Simcoe & 1st York	Angus Macdonell	1801	2nd term
Durham, Simcoe & 1st York	William Weekes (1805)	1805	1st term
Durham, Simcoe & 1st York	Robert Thorpe (January 1807)	1807	1st term
Essex	Matthew Elliott	1804	1st term
Essex	David Cowan	1804	1st term
Frontenac	Allan McLean	1804	1st term
Glengarry & Prescott	Alexander Macdonell – Speaker 1804–1808	1800	2nd term
Glengarry & Prescott	Walter Butler Wilkinson	1804	1st term
Grenville	Samuel Sherwood	1800	2nd term
Hastings & Northumberland	David McGregor Rogers	1800	2nd term
Kent	John McGregor	1804	1st term
Leeds	Peter Howard	1804	1st term
Lennox & Addington	Thomas Dorland	1804	1st term
2nd, 3rd, 4th Lincoln	Ralfe Clench	1800	2nd term
2nd, 3rd, 4th Lincoln	Isaac Swayze	1792, 1800	3rd term*
Norfolk, Oxford & Middlesex	Benajah Mallory	1804	1st term
Prince Edward	Ebenezer Washburn	1800	2nd term
Stormont & Russell	Robert Isaac Dey Gray	1796	3rd term
Stormont & Russell	D'Arcy Boulton (February 1806)	1806	1st term
West York, 1st Lincoln & Haldimand	Robert Nelles	1800	2nd term
West York, 1st Lincoln & Haldimand	Solomon Hill	1804	1st term
West York, 1st Lincoln & Haldimand	Joseph Willcocks (January 1808)	1808	1st term

== See also ==
- Legislative Council of Upper Canada
- Executive Council of Upper Canada
- Legislative Assembly of Upper Canada
- Lieutenant Governors of Upper Canada, 1791–1841
- Historical federal electoral districts of Canada
- List of Ontario provincial electoral districts
