= 3rd Parliament of Upper Canada =

Parliament for Upper Canada 1801–1804

The 3rd Parliament of Upper Canada was opened 28 May 1801. Elections in Upper Canada had been held in July 1800. All sessions were held at Parliament Buildings of Upper Canada in York, Upper Canada. This parliament was dissolved 14 May 1804.

This House of Assembly of the 3rd Parliament of Upper Canada had four sessions 28 May 1801 to 9 March 1804:

Sessions	Start	End
1st	28 May 1801	9 July 1801
2nd	25 May 1802	7 July 1802
3rd	24 January 1803	5 March 1803
4th	1 February 1804	9 March 1804

== Members ==
Riding	Member	First elected/ previously elected	No. of terms
Dundas	Jacob Weager	1800	1st term
Durham, Simcoe & 1st York	Henry Allcock unseated	1800	1st term
Durham, Simcoe & 1st York	Angus Macdonell (July 1801)	1801	1st term
Essex	Matthew Elliott	1800	1st term
Essex	Thomas McKee	1796	2nd term
Frontenac	John Ferguson	1800	1st term
Glengarry & Prescott	Alexander Macdonell	1800	1st term
Glengarry & Prescott	Angus Macdonell	1800	1st term
Grenville	Samuel Sherwood	1800	1st term
Hastings & Northumberland	David McGregor Rogers	1800	1st term
Kent	Thomas McCrae	1800	1st term
Leeds	William Buell	1800	1st term
Lennox & Addington	Timothy Thompson	1796	2nd term
2nd, 3rd, 4th Lincoln	Ralfe Clench	1800	1st term
2nd, 3rd, 4th Lincoln	Isaac Swayze	1792, 1800	2nd term*
Norfolk, Oxford & Middlesex	David William Smith – Speaker 1801–1804	1792	3rd term
Prince Edward	Ebenezer Washburn	1800	1st term
Stormont & Russell	Robert Isaac Dey Gray	1796	2nd term
West York, 1st Lincoln & Haldimand	Robert Nelles	1800	1st term
West York, 1st Lincoln & Haldimand	Richard Beasley	1796	2nd term

== See also ==
- Legislative Council of Upper Canada
- Executive Council of Upper Canada
- Legislative Assembly of Upper Canada
- Lieutenant Governors of Upper Canada, 1791–1841
- Historical federal electoral districts of Canada
- List of Ontario provincial electoral districts
