= John Ferguson =

John Ferguson may refer to:

== Politics ==
=== Australia ===
- John Ferguson (Australian politician) (1830–1906), Australian Senator and member of the Queensland Parliament
- John Maxwell Ferguson (1841–1924), member of the Legislative Assembly of Western Australia
- John Ferguson (New South Wales politician) (1903–1969), member of the New South Wales Legislative Council
- Jock Ferguson (politician) (1946–2010), Scottish-born Australian politician

=== Canada ===
- John Ferguson (Upper Canada politician) (1756–1830), judge and politician in Upper Canada
- John Ferguson (New Brunswick politician) (1813–1888), merchant and Canadian senator from New Brunswick
- John Ferguson (Ontario politician) (1839–1896), physician and Canadian MP and senator from Ontario
- John Ferguson (Canadian politician) (1840–1908), Scottish-born farmer, lumberman and political figure in Ontario, Canada

=== United Kingdom ===
- John Ferguson (Scottish activist), Irish born, late 19th century Scottish Labour Party activist
- John Ferguson (Conservative politician) (1870–1932), British Conservative MP
- John Ferguson (Northern Ireland politician) (1911–?), UUP and Alliance Party politician

=== United States ===
- John Ferguson (New York politician) (died 1832), Mayor of New York City
- John P. Ferguson, member of the Delaware House of Representatives

== Sports ==
- John Ferguson Sr. (1938–2007), Canadian ice hockey player
- John Ferguson Jr. (born 1967), former general manager of the Toronto Maple Leafs of the National Hockey League
- John Ferguson (curler) (born 1958), Canadian curler
- John Ferguson (footballer, born 1848) (1848–1929), Scottish international footballer
- Jock Ferguson (soccer) (1887–1973), Scottish-American soccer full back
- John Ferguson (footballer, born 1891) (1891–1916), Scottish footballer
- John Ferguson (footballer, born 1904) (1904–1973), English footballer (Wolverhampton Wanderers, Manchester United)
- John Ferguson (footballer, born 1931), Australian rules footballer for Melbourne and South Melbourne
- John Ferguson (footballer, born 1949), Australian rules footballer for Richmond
- John Ferguson (rugby league) (born 1954), Indigenous Australian rugby league footballer
- John Ferguson (sailor) (born 1944), Australian sailor
- John Ferguson (sportscaster) (1919–2005), American sportscaster

== Others ==
- John Ferguson (Ferguson bequest) (1787–1856), Scottish businessman and philanthropist, founder of the Ferguson bequest
- John Ferguson (clergyman) (1852–1925), New Zealand born Australian Presbyterian minister
- John Calvin Ferguson (1866–1945), Canadian-born American sinologist and educator
- John Errol Ferguson (1948–2013), American serial killer and mass murderer
- John Ferguson (organist) (1941–2025), American organist, composer, and professor
- Sir John Ferguson (police officer) (1891–1975), English chief constable
- John Ferguson (musician) (born 1978), American composer and performer, and member of The Apples in Stereo
- John Ferguson (priest) (died 1902), Anglican Dean of Moray, Ross and Caithness
- John Howard Ferguson (1838–1915), judge in Louisiana
- John Ferguson (born 1943), real name of gambling author and Blackjack Hall of Famer Stanford Wong
- John H. Ferguson (1915–1970), American lawyer and U.S. ambassador
- John H. Ferguson, defendant in the landmark American judicial case Plessy v. Ferguson
- John Ferguson (chemist) (1838–1916), Scottish chemist and bibliographer
- John Alexander Ferguson (1881–1969), New Zealand-born Australian lawyer, judge, book collector, and author
- John Thomas Ferguson (born 1941), Canadian real estate developer and chancellor of the University of Alberta
- John DeLancey Ferguson, American writer and academic
- John Macpherson Ferguson, Royal Navy admiral
- John Ferguson, a play by playwright St. John Greer Ervine
- John Ferguson (classicist) (1921–1989), Manchester-born British writer, classicist, lay preacher; held senior posts at University of Ibadan, Nigeria, Open University, Selly Oak Colleges, Birmingham

== See also ==
- Jack Ferguson (disambiguation)
- John Fergusson (disambiguation)
