= 2nd Parliament of Upper Canada =

Parliament for Upper Canada 1797–1800

The 2nd Parliament of Upper Canada was opened 1 June 1797. Elections in Upper Canada had been held in August 1796. The first session was held at Navy Hall in Newark. The Lieutenant-Governor of Upper Canada John Graves Simcoe believed York was a superior location for the capital as it would less vulnerable to attack by the Americans. York became the capital of Upper Canada on 1 February 1796. The remaining three sessions were held at the Parliament Buildings of Upper Canada in York, Upper Canada. This parliament was dissolved 7 July 1800.

This House of Assembly of the 2nd Parliament of Upper Canada had four sessions 3 June 1797 to 4 July 1800:

Sessions	Start	End
1st	3 June 1797	July 1797
2nd	5 June 1798	5 July 1798
3rd	12 June 1799	29 June 1799
4th	2 June 1800	4 July 1800

== Members ==
Riding	Member	First elected	No. of terms
Dundas	Thomas Fraser	1796	1st term
Durham, York & 1st Lincoln	Richard Beasley	1796	1st term
1st Glengarry	Richard Norton Wilkinson	1796	1st term
2nd Glengarry	John McDonell	1792	2nd term
Grenville	Edward Jessup, Jr.	1796	1st term
Kent	Thomas Smith	1796	1st term
Kent	Thomas McKee	1796	1st term
Leeds & Frontenac	Solomon Jones	1796	1st term
Lennox, Hastings & Northumberland	Timothy Thompson	1796	1st term
2nd Lincoln	Samuel Street	1796	1st term
3rd Lincoln	David William Smith – Speaker 1796–1800	1792	2nd term
4th Lincoln & Norfolk	Benjamin Hardison	1796	1st term
Ontario & Addington	Christopher Robinson died 2 November 1798 in office.	1796	1st term
Ontario & Addington	William Fairfield (from June 1799)	1799	1st term
Prince Edward & Adolphus Township	David McGregor Rogers	1796	1st term
Stormont	Robert Isaac Dey Gray	1796	1st term
Suffolk & Essex	John Cornwall	1796	1st term

== See also ==
- Legislative Council of Upper Canada
- Executive Council of Upper Canada
- Legislative Assembly of Upper Canada
- Lieutenant Governors of Upper Canada, 1791–1841
- Historical federal electoral districts of Canada
- List of Ontario provincial electoral districts
