= Upper Canada Guardian =

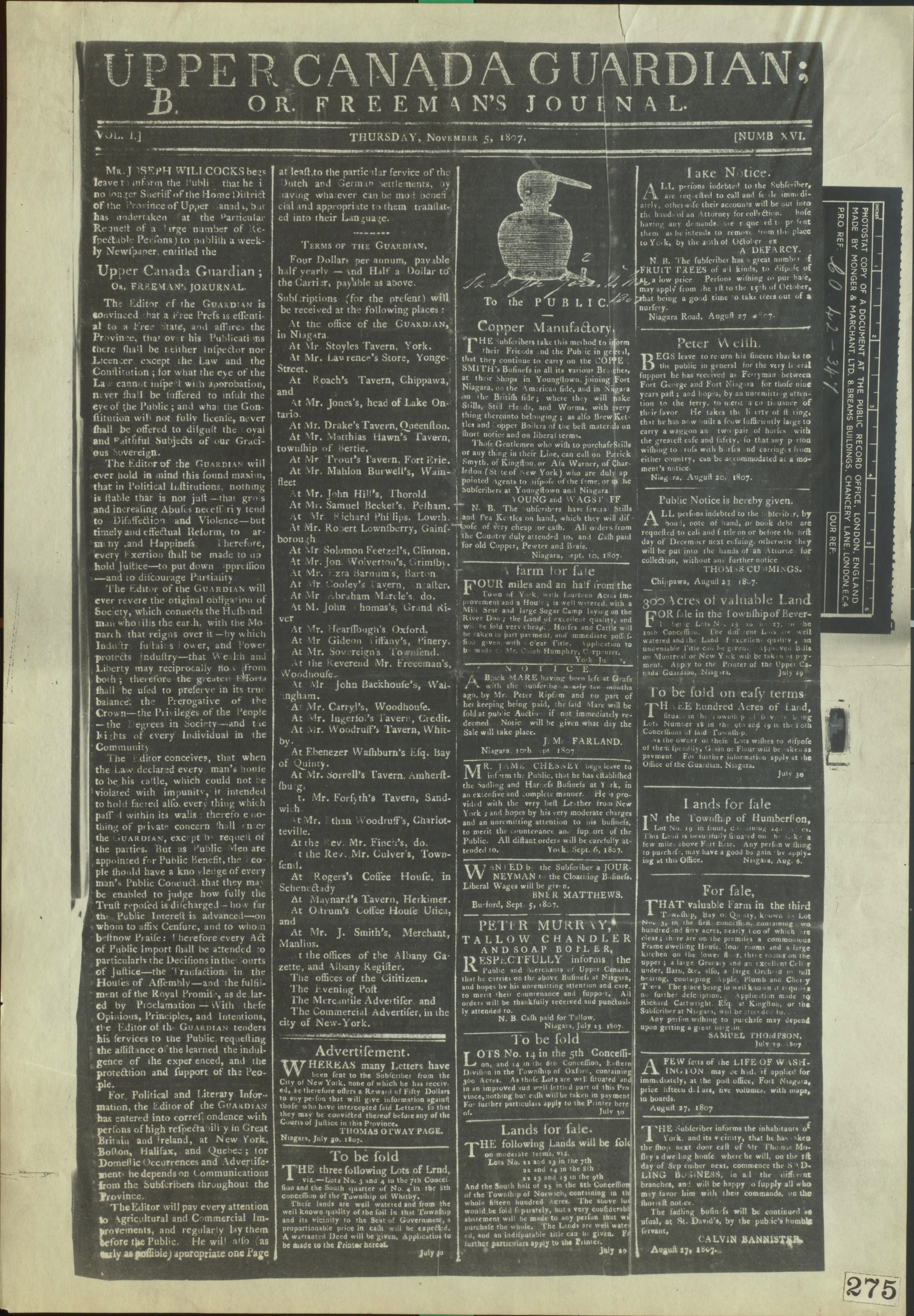
- Volume 1 of the Upper Canada Guardian - November 5, 1807
- Publisher: Joseph Willcocks
- Founded: 24 July 1807
- Ceased publication: 9 June 1812
- Language: English
- Headquarters: Newark, Upper Canada (Niagara-on-the-Lake, Ontario)

The Upper Canada Guardian; or Freeman's Journal was one of the first opposition papers in 19th century Upper Canada. Its publisher and editor Joseph Willcocks established it after moving to Niagara in 1807 to combat arbitrary power, oppressive land laws, and ultimately create liberty in the province. Willcocks claimed that the Guardian was meant: “to disseminate the principles of political truth, check the progress of inordinate power, and keep alive the sacred flame of a just and rational liberty.” In 1809, Judge William Dummer Powell complained of its widespread popularity and the fact that it was in nearly every household. It was a four-page paper (11 by 17 and a half inches) published between July 24, 1807, and June 9, 1812 and printed in with the roman cursive “f” representing the English long "s". The Upper Canada Guardian came to an end when Willcocks sold its printing press to Richard Hatt in June 1812 for $1,600.

== Upper Canada papers before the Upper Canada Guardian ==
The first newspaper published in Upper Canada was the Upper Canada Gazette in April 1793 in Niagara which recognized that a community benefits from political press and aimed to publish accounts of government events. The Tiffany brothers (Gideon and Silvester) created the first independent newspaper in Niagara July 1799, known as the Canada Constellation. However, the paper lasted only until 1800 due to its pro-American sympathies and a lack of government aid and subscriptions.

== Beginning of political opposition ==
William Weekes' attacks of the government in 1806 over "financial mismanagement" led him to meet Robert Thorpe, a newly immigrated judge who did not fear supporting Weekes and his beliefs. In fact, Thorpe went behind the back of British officials and helped the assembly to oppose the government. After Weekes' address to Sir Francis Gore in 1806 over his disappointment "of the neglect of public interest and arbitrary nature of government" and his later death, Thorpe took over his position. He came to Niagara and formed a partnership with Willcocks, and together they followed in Weekes' footsteps. They did not concern themselves with petitioning the British government as Weekes did, but rather were the first to oppose the Upper Canadian government on a "systematic basis."

Prior to Weekes' death in 1806, Thorpe and Willcocks had already begun to resist authoritarian rule in 1805. Thorpe argued that: “the colony of Upper Canada was subject...to the control of Parliament though (like Ireland, Man, and the rest) not bound by any acts of Parliament, unless particularly named.” Willcocks began to question his bond to the acts of Parliament using Thorpe as inspiration. Together, their political and public discourse eventually fully adopted the 18th century Whig tradition by being “opposed to arbitrary and distant power, valu[ing] loyalty to [the] country rather than to [the] rulers and believed in independence of colonial legislatures.” The basis of the Whig mentality is acknowledging the errors of the past for the sake of the present, and through emphasizing liberty and innovation, one can become successful in this opposition. This eventually led to their formation of an opposition group from 1806 to 1808. Willcocks and Thorpe each held public meetings; where Willcocks was concerned about asking the attendees advice on issues. According to historian Bruce Wilson, this proved to be beneficial to Willcocks as it aided him in "[forging] an effective local position to the mercantile-official elite of the Niagara district." In 1811, the Thorpe-Willcocks assembly group, including Charles Burton Wyatt and John Mills Jackson used their connection to Britain to continue their opposition against Governor Gore, and created a petition over the "partiality and corruption" of the provincial administration.

Inhabitants realized the irresponsibility and evil existence in the legislature but had no newspaper press to stimulate their observations. For the first fifteen years of Upper Canada existing, the Provincial Government did as they pleased without being criticized. There was the Upper Canada Gazette that officially represented the Administration but they “refused to publish opposition election addresses or rebuttals to libels made by government supporters.” The Upper Canada Guardian was the first paper in Upper Canada to finally publish opposition opinions. As J.J.Talman commented of the time: "There was no Hansard in Upper Canada and the journals of the legislature [gave] only a bare account of the business carried on, we are entirely dependent on newspaper reports for information as to what, and how much, was said on the floor of the assembly."

Although the group could not be labeled a "party" (as it had no formal structure) they still managed in gaining other members and creating strong ideals by having practical and educated responses to issues of the day, such as: “land-granting, executive power, and social inequities.” However, Governor Gore often saw it as bad conduct, and in 1807 they were both prosecuted; Thorpe was removed from the bench and Willocks lost his office of the sheriff in the Home District. It was at this point where when Willcocks gained freedom from office liability that he decided to create the Upper Canada Guardian. Thorpe later used the Upper Canada Guardian in November of that year to make an address, responding to the situation: "Though wretched, even to agony, whilst under the slightest imputation, yet your welfare, your happiness and the prosperity of the province, shall engage my attention and animate my exertions."

== Goals and subject matter ==
On Thursday, November 5, 1807, the first copies of the Upper Canada Guardian were released with the credentials clearly summarized on the front page. The goal of the paper claimed to set justice, end oppression and diminish partiality, and that the greatest efforts would be made to: "preserve in its true balance, the Prerogative of the Crown -- the Privileges of the People -- the Degrees in Society -- and the Rights of every Individual in the Community.” Willcocks wanted to reach out to gain the: "assistance of the learned, the indulgence of the experienced, and the protection and support of the People." He claimed credibility by noting his association with people from Great Britain, Ireland, New York, Boston, Halifax and Quebec; and urged readership by claiming that he depended on subscribers for advertisements and "domestic occurrences." The opening sentences of the paper summarize Willcocks' inspiration in starting the Upper Canada Guardian and reveal its ambitions:

The Editor of the GUARDIAN is convinced that a Free Press is essential to a Free state, and assures the Province, that over his Publications there shall be neither inspector nor Licenser except the Law and the Constitution; for what the eye of the Law cannot inspect with approbation, never shall be suffered to insult the eye of the Public; and what the Constitution will not fully license, never shall be offered to disgust the Loyal and Faithful Subjects of our Gracious Sovereign.”

The general factors that caused political opposition in Upper Canada in 1802 to 1804 were the: "widespread reaction against government changes in land policy[...]which increased the fees on land grants and tightened the rules concerning the eligibility of loyalists for free land grants." The Upper Canada Guardian took on these kinds of issues and often included advertisements for land and documentation of agricultural and commercial improvements.

Amongst all this, Willcocks did not initially aim to explicitly reveal his strong oppositional force in which the paper was essentially driven. With the Upper Canada Guardian Joseph Willcocks wanted to: “revolutionize the province” despite knowing the probable controversy it would cause. Because of his Whig ideology, he did not see a contradiction between his loyalty and opposition to the Upper Canadian government. He had a strong political opinion and was not afraid to voice it in the paper. In an 1809 issue, Willcocks observed that: "Our Magistrates are not moved with the same tender compassion towards the people and impose no more taxes on them than would be actually wanting to defray the District Expenditures.” His loyalty drove him to take advantage of the power of the press; he used the paper as a platform to communicate the assembly's and his personal opinions of government in Upper Canada. He also provided opportunity for others to engage in conversation by publishing letters that were written to the newspaper and his response; or even a letter that questioned another letter that was addressed to the paper. Willcocks even promoted his own personal business of “conveyancing” although it antagonized the legal profession of his day. He published this address in nearly every issue: “The undersigned flatters himself with the hope that by his strict attention to the commands of all those who may wish to employ him, in conjunction with his knowledge of the business, to render that general satisfaction which will secure to himself the patronage of a discerning public.” Essentially, Willcocks desired to inspire his readers into acting justly despite the consequences. In the last issues of the paper on June 9, 1812, he claimed that he was an enemy “of the measure of the Kings Servants in this colony” and that he was a: “constant adherent to the interests of the Country.”

== Controversy ==
Gore attacked the Upper Canada Guardian and claimed that the "Seditious Printer" made “vulgar attacks” on the government that were "relished too much, by the good people of Upper Canada." . He was an object of hate to Governor Gore as he described him as a: “execrable monster who would deluge the Province with blood.” In 1808, Willcocks' opinion took him too far and he was imprisoned for accusing: “every member of the first provincial parliament [that they] had received a bribe of twelve hundred acres of land[...]to vote against interests of constituents.” Willcocks responded to the matter by publishing a lengthy letter in the March 18, 1808 edition of the paper defending himself and arguing that this claim was blown out of proportion: “As a proof of the misconception and incorrect statement of the informants (for they cannot be considered as witnesses when not under an oath), I have only to refer you to that paragraph in the Guardian which expressly states, that Governor Hunter DID NOT bribe the members of the House of Assembly.” Willcocks was not successful in accomplishing much change in Upper Canada because he was being persecuted so often. The government in which Willcocks’ was opposing saw his desires of reform in the paper occasionally as unrealistically hopeful.

== Willcocks' positive reputation ==
Being the first politically critical newspapers in Upper Canada in the 19th century, the Upper Canada Guardian gave Willcocks the opportunity to lead groups in opposition of the administration. Although his jail prosecution served as a minor setback, it also gained him the sympathy of the victims of the issues that he addressed (such as small farmers and/or loyalists who wanted land grant privileges), a seat in parliament and more readers. Willcocks claimed he was the: “only man in Canada that dare speak the truth.” Even though controversy creates problems, there are some benefits that can always be gained from them eventually. In this case, Joseph Willcocks gained the reputation of a man who was not afraid to publish his opinion to the public; a near first in Upper Canada in the early 19th century. Even though the Upper Canada Guardian exhibited Willcocks' seditiousness against the government, it was not his goal to be perceived as a radical personage:

"It is not my intention, Gentlemen, by a recital of sufferings, to influence or irritate the minds of an injured, insulted, and loyal people. No: but it is my intention and my wish to impress upon the public mind the indispensable necessity there is of sending men to the new parliament, whose livelihood or prospects in life do not depend upon the will or caprice of any tyrannic individual, and whose principles are unambitious, and beyond the reach of corruption."

The Upper Canada Guardian was Willcocks' biggest achievement because it initiated opposition through action and press in Upper Canada in the 19th century.

His commitment to civil liberties eventually led him to treason against Upper Canada as he sided with the Americans in the War of 1812. He was later killed in battle in Fort Erie, Upper Canada.
