= Attorney General Boulton =

Attorney General Boulton may refer to:

- G. D'Arcy Boulton (1759–1834), Attorney-General for Upper Canada
- Henry John Boulton (1790–1870), Attorney-General for Upper Canada
