= William Weekes =

Canadian politician (??–1806)

William Weekes (died October 11, 1806) was a lawyer and political figure in Upper Canada.

Weekes was born in Ireland and emigrated first to the United States, working in the law office of Aaron Burr, before settling in York (Toronto) in 1798. He quickly entered politics, campaigning on behalf of Henry Allcock in 1800, where he arranged to have the poll closed early while Allcock was in the lead. This led to his candidate losing his seat on appeal.

== Time in the Upper Canada Legislature ==
In 1804, Weekes stood for election in the riding of Durham, Simcoe, and 1st York, but was defeated by Angus Macdonell. In February, 1805, however, he was elected in a by-election as a result of the death of Macdonnell aboard HMS Speedy. As soon as he took his seat in the House, Weekes introduced a motion "that it is expedient for this House to enter into the consideration of the disquietude which prevails in the Province by reason of the administration of Public Offices." The motion was defeated, and the next day Lieutenant Governor Peter Hunter prorogued the House. Hunter died shortly thereafter, and his Family Compact allies led by John McGill, the Inspector General, and Thomas Scott, then Attorney General for Upper Canada, successfully installed Alexander Grant as Hunter's successor.

When the House reassembled a year later, Weekes had organized his committee on the state of the province. This committee investigated and condemned the administration of the land-granting department, and "championed the cause of those United Empire Loyalists and military claimants who found it difficult to get justice in the allotment of lands." Weekes also uncovered £617 of misspent public funds that the newly appointed provincial administrator Francis Gore felt compelled to reimburse. Weekes counted as allies David McGregor Rogers and Philip Dorland, fellow representatives in the House. Beyond the House, Weekes enjoyed support from Judge Robert Thorpe and Charles Burton Wyatt, the surveyor-general.

In 1806, in court, Weekes' dissatisfaction with the Family Compact came to a boil when he referred to the recently deceased Lieutenant Governor Hunter as a "gothic barbarian". After a dispute with William Dickson on this remark, Weekes challenged him to a duel. On October 10, Weekes was mortally wounded and died the next day.

His friend, Robert Thorpe, was elected to his seat in a by-election.
