= Angus Macdonell =

Angus Macdonell may refer to:

- Angus Macdonell of Collachie (died 1804), lawyer and political figure in Upper Canada
- Angus Claude Macdonell (1861–1924), Canadian lawyer and politician
- Angus MacDonell (c. 1751–1817?), soldier and political figure in Upper Canada
- Angus MacDonnell (died 1565), Scottish-Gaelic lord
- Angus McDonnell (1881–1966), British engineer, diplomat and politician
