= Jack Ferguson (disambiguation) =

Jack Ferguson (1924–2002) was an Australian politician.

Jack Ferguson may also refer to:

- Jack Ferguson (footballer) (1901–1966), Australian rules footballer who played with South Melbourne
- Jack Ferguson (golfer), Scottish golfer
- Jack Ferguson (water polo) (1922–1994), Australian water polo player
- Jack Ferguson Award, awarded each year to the top draft pick in the Ontario Hockey League Priority Selection Draft
- Jack Ferguson, a fictional character in The Adventure of the Sussex Vampire, a 1924 Sherlock Holmes story by Sir Arthur Conan Doyle

== See also ==
- John Ferguson (disambiguation)
