= Thomas Cochran (judge) =

Thomas Cochran (1777 – October 8, 1804) was a Nova Scotia lawyer and judge in Prince Edward Island and Upper Canada.

Cochran was born in Halifax, the son of Thomas Cochran, a merchant and member of the Nova Scotia House of Assembly for Liverpool, Nova Scotia and Jane Allen. Cochran was one of eight children born to his father's second wife.

He studied at King's College, spent time in Quebec before headed to England to further his studies at Lincoln's Inn and was called to the English bar in 1801. In that same year, Cochran was appointed Chief Justice for Prince Edward Island.

In June 1802, he was named judge for the Court of King's Bench for Upper Canada and headed west from Prince Edward Island. Cochran was travelling aboard the schooner HMS Speedy to attend a trial in the province when the ship sank in a winter storm on Lake Ontario in 1804. There were no survivors. He was replaced on the bench by Robert Thorpe.
