= Joseph Willcocks =

Canadian politician (1773–1814)

Legislator for 1st Lincoln and Haldimand
- In office 1808 – July 1813

Legislator for West York, 1st Lincoln and Haldimand
- In office 1807–1808
- Preceded by: Solomon Hill
- Succeeded by: abolished

Sheriff of York
- In office 1804–1807

Personal details
- Born: 1773 Palmerstown, Ireland
- Died: September 4, 1814 (aged 40–41)

Joseph Willcocks (1773 – September 4, 1814) sometimes spelt Wilcox was a publisher and political figure in Upper Canada. He was elected to the Parliament of Upper Canada in 1807 representing York, 1st Lincoln and Haldimand. He was re-elected twice and frequently opposed government policies. He became disillusioned with Upper Canada after military rule was introduced to Upper Canada during the War of 1812 and defected to the United States. He was mortally shot on September 4, 1814, at Fort Erie, and buried in Buffalo, New York.

== Early life ==
He was born in Palmerstown, Ireland in 1773. He was the second son to Robert Willcocks and Jane Powell. During the Irish Rebellion of 1798 he was loyal to the British Empire.

He came to York on March 20, 1800.

== Career ==
=== York ===
On May 1, 1800, he was hired to be the private clerk of Peter Russell, who was a distant cousin. He later became a receiver and payer of fees for the Office of the Surveyor General. He was dismissed from this role when Russell's half-sister revealed their romantic relationship. Henry Allcock hired Willcocks as a clerk and William Jarvis employed him to engrave deeds. On May 9, 1803, he was appointed as registrar of the probate court and marshall for the courts of assizes.

In 1804, Willcocks became sheriff for the Home District. He was active in an 1806 by-election for Robert Thorpe, a friend and neighbour. Willcocks and Thorpe were concerned about changes in government policies regarding land grants, which were controlled by the Executive Council, an appointed body. As a result of these criticisms, Lieutenant Governor Francis Gore removed Thorpe from office and withdrew Willcocks' appointment as sheriff in 1807, citing "general and notorious bad conduct".

=== Niagara ===
Willcocks moved to Niagara where he began to publish The Upper Canada Guardian; or Freeman's Journal. He used the newspaper to criticise the government and voice his opposition to Upper Canada's land laws. In 1807, he was elected in a by-election for West York, 1st Lincoln & Haldimand after the death of Solomon Hill. During the 4th Parliament, he was jailed for contempt of the house. He was re-elected in 1808 to 1st Lincoln and Haldimand and became the leader of the parliamentary opposition. His political positions in this session included lower salaries for public servants, less regulations for loyalists and military personnel to obtain land and more regulation on election procedures. During the last session of the 5th Parliament, Willcocks and his group successfully resisted efforts by Isaac Brock to pass a number of measures preparing for the expected war with the United States.

Willcocks was a member of the Freemasonry in the Niagara Lodge.

Brock called an election in 1812 to obtain a legislature that would support his war preparations. Willcocks was reelected for the rising of 1st Lincoln and Haldimand. In June 1812 he sold his printing press to Richard Hatt. Brock enlisted Willcocks's help to secure the loyalty and participation of the Six Nations peoples to the British Crown in the upcoming war and Willcocks was successful despite his poor health. He fought in the Battle of Queenston Heights and recruited for the Canadian militia.

In early June 1813 hardline loyalists were upset with Willcock's opposition to giving extended powers to the government. They spread a rumour that Willcocks was working with American forces in their invasion to Stoney Creek. There is evidence that he was actively involved in supporting American forces at Stoney Creek.

== Defection to United States ==
=== Disillusionment with British rule ===
Willcocks was disturbed when military rule and harsh measures against people expressing disloyal opinions were introduced in the province. Willcocks saw this as an abandonment of democratic principles in the province. In July 1813 switched allegiance and travelled to the United States to join the Americans. He was made a major in the American army and commanded a company of Canadian Volunteers consisting of expatriate Canadians fighting on the American side.

=== Conducting Operations in Canada ===
In the fall of 1813 George McClure appointed Willcocks as the police officer of Niagara. In this capacity, Willcocks regulated the movements of the city's citizens and interrogated prisoners.

=== Raid at Newark ===
On December 10, 1813. Joseph Willcocks conducted a raid with 100 armed members of his militia and 70 U.S. Regulars. Joseph Willcocks marched on his horse while leading his column. Willcocks and his force burned more than 60 structures of public and private property. Willcocks recruited four Canadians, who joined him, and Willcocks withdrew to New York with 24 prisoners.

=== Raid on Saint David’s ===
On July 22, 1814, Joseph Willcocks, with 200-300 men, who included American dragoons, made a surprise raid on Saint David's, where there were four Canadian militiamen. The Americans, under Willcocks, came around by the mountain and surrounded the house where the Canadian militiamen were staying. The Canadian militiamen fired through the windows with their muskets, killing one American dragoon and wounding a few horses. The Canadian militiamen refused to surrender until the American dragoon captain Harrison stepped forward into the open and persuaded the Canadian militiamen to surrender. The Canadian militia surrendered. Joseph Willccocks and his fellow American raiders destroyed the house that the Canadian militia had taken shelter in. Then Willcocks and his fellow raiders withdrew to American territory with four Canadian prisoners.

=== Marked for treason ===
In the spring of 1814 fifteen Upper Canadians, including Willcocks, were charged with high treason as part of the Ancaster Bloody Assize.

== Death ==
On September 4, 1814, during the Siege of Fort Erie. Joseph Willcocks led a sortie against a British battery. After six hours of fighting, the sortie raiding force under Joseph Willcocks withdrew, with Joseph getting killed. His body was buried initially in "the circle or open square of that village (Buffalo, New York)" and reburied in Forest Lawn Cemetery in the 1830s.
