= Robert Isaac Dey Gray =

Canadian politician

The Honourable Justice Robert Isaac Dey Gray
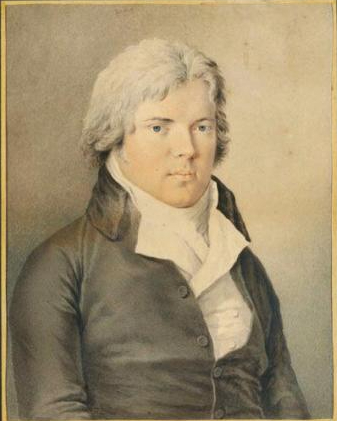

2nd Treasurer of the Law Society of Upper Canada
- In office 1798–1801
- Preceded by: John White
- Succeeded by: Angus Macdonell

Personal details
- Born: 1772 New York
- Died: 1804 (aged 31–32) Off Newcastle District in Lake Ontario
- Occupation: Solicitor General, Judge

Robert Isaac Dey Gray (ca. 1772 – October 8, 1804) was a lawyer, judge and political figure in Upper Canada.

He was probably born in New York, but came to Canada with his parents (James Gray and Elizabeth Low) at the beginning of the American Revolution. He studied law and was called to the bar in 1794. In 1795, he became Solicitor General for the province. He became a district court judge for the Home District in 1796.

He was elected to the 2nd Parliament of Upper Canada representing Stormont and the 3rd and 4th Parliament of Upper Canada representing Stormont and Russell.

He assumed the duties of the attorney general after the death of John White in 1800 until Thomas Scott arrived in 1801.

On October 7, 1804, he left York (Toronto) aboard HMS Speedy to prosecute a murder case at the district town for the Newcastle District. The ship sank off Presqu'ile Point in a storm on Lake Ontario and all hands were lost.

Gray was a slave owner and, upon his death, he freed one enslaved woman, Dorinda (or Dorine) Baker, through his will.

Preceded by unknown	Solicitor General of Upper Canada; 1795–1804	Succeeded by D’Arcy Boulton

Preceded by John White	Acting Attorney General of Upper Canada; 1800–1801	Succeeded by Thomas Scott
