= Hardison =

Hardison is a surname. Notable people with the surname include:

- Benjamin Hardison (1761–1823), farmer, miller and political figure in Upper Canada
- Bethann Hardison, American model
- Casey William Hardison (born 1971), American chemist
- Dee Hardison (1956–2018), American football player
- Harold Hardison (1923–2015), American politician from North Carolina
- Kadeem Hardison (born 1965), American actor
- Marcus Hardison (born 1992), American football player
- Wallace Hardison (1850–1909), co-founder of Union Oil

Fictional characters:

- Alec Hardison, hacker in the TV series Leverage

== See also ==
- O. B. Hardison Jr. Poetry Prize, American poetry prize
