= Mary Osborn (murderer) =

First woman to be executed in Upper Canada (c. 1773 - 1801)

- Born: 1773; Bedford, Pennsylvania
- Died: 17 August 1801 (aged 27–28); Niagara-on-the-Lake, Ontario
- Known for: Being the first woman to be executed in Upper Canada
- Criminal charges: Murder
- Criminal penalty: Capital punishment by hanging
- Partner(s): Bartholomew London (1798–1801); George Nemiers (1800–1801)
- Children: 4

Mary London (better known as Mary Osborn, also Osburn and Osborne; c. 1773 – 17 August 1801) was the first woman to be executed in Upper Canada for the murder of her partner, Bartholomew London.

== Early life ==
Osborn was originally from Bedford, Pennsylvania. By her own account, her upbringing had been uneventful.

By the time Osborn moved to Saltfleet Township (today Stoney Creek, Ontario), she was widowed with two sons. According to her later co-accused, she claimed to have killed her first husband by poisoning him with hellebore.

== Immigration to Canada ==
Around 1798, Osborne accepted a job as the housekeeper of Bartholomew London, a farmer originally from New Jersey who had been imprisoned during the American Revolution for his loyalty to Britain. Osborn was around 40 years younger than London, who had four children and four grandchildren of his own when they met. He had left, and perhaps not legally divorced, his first wife in the United States in 1789.

Nonetheless, London entered into a relationship with Osborn, who became pregnant in 1798 with their daughter, Hannah (born April 5, 1799). London recognized Osborn as his wife or partner in May 1800 by changing his will to leave his estate of 200 acres to her. This will instructed Osborn to provide for her sons, Nathaniel and William Osborn, as well as Hannah in the event of his death. Were Osborn to remarry, she would also retain one-third of London's estate, which was a generous settlement for a prospective widow at that time. The will also excluded London's children from his previous marriage.

Later in 1800, London hired another Pennsylvanian immigrant, 28-year-old George Nemiers (also recorded as Nemire), to work on his farm. Osborn and Nemiers were acquainted from having both lived in Carlisle for a time. An affair began between Osborn and Nemiers, and Osborn was pregnant again by late 1800, though she was unsure if the father was Nemiers or London.

According to Osborn, Nemiers responded to news of her pregnancy by suggesting they should murder London. However, when Osborn suggested that Nemiers should shoot London, Nemiers disagreed. A short time after this discussion, Nemiers intervened in a verbal argument between London and Osborn by hitting London on the head with a hammer. This assault left London with a fractured skull, but it became apparent that he would recover from his injury.

== Murder of Bartholomew London ==
After Nemiers' attack on London proved non-fatal, Osborn and Nemiers conspired to poison him. Using an assumed name, Nemiers visited a doctor in Long Point in early 1801, claiming he required sulfuric acid for a poorly-healing wound. In conversation with the physician, he asked how much of the substance would be needed to kill a person; the physician assured him that the amount prescribed would not prove fatal. Nemiers subsequently asked the physician to increase the dosage, but was refused.

The second attempt Nemiers made to secure lethal substances was successful. He purchased opium and ratbane during a trip to the Finger Lakes in New York, and returned to Ontario on February 14, 1801. Over the following days, Osborn was said to have served London whiskey laced with the substances from Nemiers, and London died after a third dose on February 17. Hamilton Public Library recognizes this event as the first recorded murder in the city of Hamilton.

Suspicion arose after physicians, including Dr. Oliver Tiffany, examined London's body and concluded he had been poisoned. Osborn, then four months pregnant, was arrested along with Nemiers. In the months before their trial, the couple attempted to blame one another solely for the crime.

== Trial ==
The trial of Osborn and Nemiers on the charge of murder commenced on August 14, 1801, five days after Osborn's second daughter Catherine was born. At this time, trials and indeed convictions for murder were rare in Upper Canada. In 1795, John White, then-attorney general for the region, had notably complained that all defendants tried for murder had been "acquitted [by juries, even] though the evidence was strongly against them." Osborn's trial subsequently captured the attention of Silvester Tiffany, editor of the Niagara Herald newspaper.

Proceedings took place at Niagara-on-the-Lake before Judge Henry Allcock and Associate Justice William Dickinson, with Attorney General Thomas Scott leading the prosecution. 14 witnesses testified, including Robert Nelles, and presenters of unanimous medical evidence that London had not died from the fractured skull sustained some weeks before, but from poisoning. After eight hours, the jury returned a guilty verdict for both Nemiers and Osborn, without determining which of the pair had administered the poison. Allcock sentenced both to death by hanging, and for their bodies to be dissected afterwards.

=== Post-conviction remarks ===
After Osborn and Nemiers' conviction, Silvester Tiffany of the Niagara Herald spoke to both in prison. Nemiers was remorseful for his crime, though he tried to blame his involvement on Osborn, depicting her as having "lured him to unlawful intimacy."

For her part, Osborn showed an indifference to her sentence that took Tiffany by surprise, as did her refusal to offer a full confession or some show of remorse. She suggested a third party was involved in the crime, and this person had suggested murdering London to "get the old rascal out of the way." She further claimed that she had only ever given opium to London. When Tiffany asked for the name of the third party, Osborn provided one, but warned him against investigating them: "two of us to die for this is enough." Tiffany, who doubted Osborn's claims, never printed the individual's name.

== Execution ==
Osborn and Nemiers were executed by hanging on August 17, 1801, outside the court house in Niagara-on-the-Lake where they had been tried. According to Silvester Tiffany, Osborn's final words on the gallows were: "May this be a warning to you all." Their deaths attracted a large crowd of spectators, and one woman in attendance reportedly mimicked Osborn's dying sounds and gestures. At the time of her death, Osborn was 28 years old.

The executions of Osborn and Nemiers constituted two of six capital convictions in Upper Canada between 1791 and 1801. They were also the first of Upper Canada's convicts to have their bodies donated to medical science, in a practice that would continue until around 1830. Osborn ultimately received no grave or memorial.

=== Aftermath ===
London's daughter from his first marriage, Mehitable Whitsell, raised Hannah, Osborn's daughter with London. Although paternity of Osborn's second daughter Catherine was never established, she was nonetheless registered as London's daughter, and may have been raised by another member of the London family. William, Osborn's son from her first marriage, fought for Canada in the War of 1812.
