= G. D'Arcy Boulton =

Lawyer, judge and politician in Upper Canada

5th Treasurer of the Law Society of Upper Canada
- In office 1806–1811
- Preceded by: Thomas Scott
- Succeeded by: William Warren Baldwin

Personal details
- Born: George D'Arcy Boulton; May 20, 1759 Moulton, Lincolnshire, England
- Died: May 21, 1834 (aged 75) York (Toronto), Upper Canada
- Spouse: Elizabeth Forster
- Children: D'Arcy Boulton; Henry John Boulton; George Strange Boulton; James Boulton

George D'Arcy Boulton (May 20, 1759 – May 21, 1834) was a lawyer, judge and political figure in Upper Canada. He was a member of the Family Compact, an oligarchic political and social group which dominated the government of the province.

== Life and career ==
The second son of Henry Boulton J.P., of Moulton, Lincolnshire, and his third wife, Mary, the daughter of D'Arcy Preston of Askham Bryan Hall, Yorkshire. He studied law at the Middle Temple. After his business in England failed in 1793, he came to the Hudson River valley of New York in 1797.

Boulton later moved to Augusta Township in Upper Canada around 1802. In 1803, he was admitted to the bar. In 1804, he assumed the position of Solicitor General after the death of Robert Isaac Dey Gray on HMS Speedy; he was also elected to Gray's former seat in the 4th Parliament of Upper Canada in a by-election. In 1807, he became a judge for the Court of King's Bench.

In 1810, while sailing to England, he was taken prisoner by a French privateer. Boulton fought vigorously in the short-lived attempt to defend the ship and for his troubles he received a sabre slash across his forehead; he was kept at Verdun and released in 1813. He was admitted to the English bar in the same year and secured the post of Attorney-General of Upper Canada in December 1814. Boulton and his family were considered to be part of the Family Compact, a clique of Upper Canada's elite who held great power in the province.

== Marriage and children ==
At London in 1782, he married Elizabeth Forster (whose elder sister married D'Arcy's elder brother), daughter and co-heiress of Chief Justice James Forster of the Isle of Ely, Serjeant-at-law, by Susannah, daughter of Sir John Strange.

He died at York (Toronto) in 1834 at The Grange, the home of his son D'Arcy Boulton (1785–1846), Auditor-General of Upper Canada and brother-in-law of Sir John Robinson, 1st Baronet, of Toronto. He was the father of Henry John Boulton and George Strange Boulton, among others, and the grandfather of William Henry Boulton and D'Arcy Boulton (1825–1875).

== Legacy ==
Boulton bequeathed property at what is now Queen Street West and McCaul Street for the creation of a public market in perpetuity. The property, which is still owned by the city, became St. Patrick's Market.

Boulton's sold the north half of his Park Lot 13 to provide land for King's College (now the University of Toronto).
