= Jock Ferguson =

Jock Ferguson may refer to:

- Jock Ferguson (soccer) (1887–1973), Scottish-American soccer full back
- Jock Ferguson (politician) (1946–2010), Scottish-born Australian politician

== See also ==
- John Ferguson (disambiguation)
