= Solomon Hill =

Solomon Hill can refer to:

- Solomon Hill (politician) (1756–1807), politician in Upper Canada
- Solomon Hill (basketball) (born 1991), American professional basketball player
- King Solomon Hill (1897–1949), blues singer and guitarist

== See also ==
- Solomon Hills, a mountain range in Santa Barbara, California
