= David Breakenridge Read =

Canadian mayor (1823–1904)

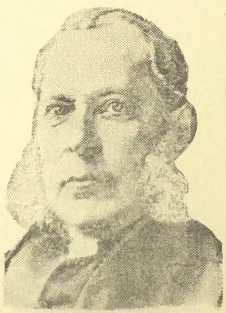

14th Mayor of Toronto
- In office November 11, 1858 – December 31, 1858
- Preceded by: William Henry Boulton
- Succeeded by: Adam Wilson

Personal details
- Born: June 13, 1823 Augusta Township, Upper Canada
- Died: May 11, 1904 (aged 80) Toronto, Ontario, Canada
- Resting place: St. James Cemetery (Toronto)

David Breakenridge Read (13 June 1823 – 11 May 1904) was a Canadian lawyer, educator, writer, and Mayor of Toronto in 1858. Read was Mayor of Toronto from November 11, 1858 to December 31, 1858. He served a mere 50 days, thus making him the shortest-serving Mayor of that city.

Born in Merrickville, Ontario, the sixth child of John Landon Read (1789-1857) and Janet Breakenridge (1795-1832). Read was educated in Brockville, and, at the age of thirteen, was accepted into Toronto's Upper Canada College. Four years later, 1840, he was admitted to the Law Society of Upper Canada. Read began his law articles while working for George Sherwood in Brockville. His studies were finished with John Ross in Belleville and then John Willoughby Crawford in Toronto. Read was admitted into the bar in 1845. He then began a law practice which became successful. In 1845 he served as Barrister at Law.

He married Emily Ballard, born 1827, daughter of Norman Ballard. The couple had seven children.

In November 1855, he was elected a Bencher of the Law Society of Upper Canada. The next year, Read was appointed by Attorney General John A. Macdonald to a commission to revise the statutes of Upper Canada. Read served as a junior commissioner and was the commission's secretary. In 1858, he was elected to Toronto City Council as alderman for St Patrick's Ward. Council appointed him Mayor of Toronto on November 11, 1858 after his predecessor, William Henry Boulton, announced his resignation. He served in that post until December 31 of that year, when Adam Wilson was elected to take that post. He was also a member of the Orange Order in Canada.

Read continued to serve in the Law Society until his retirement in April 1881 at the age of 55. In November 1902, at the age of 79, Read suffered a stroke that would leave him bedridden for the final year and half until his death. He died on May 11, 1904, and was buried among many of his colleagues in a private funeral at St. James Cemetery in Toronto.
