= Matthew Munsel Howard =

Upper Canada politician, militia officer and farmer

Matthew Munsel Howard (1794 – September 6, 1879) was a miller, farmer and political figure in Upper Canada. He represented Leeds in the Legislative Assembly of Upper Canada as a Reformer from 1830 to 1834 and in 1836.

He was born in Upper Canada, the son of Peter Howard and Sarah Munsell. Howard married Harriet Nichols. He lived in Yonge Township and then Elizabethtown Township. He served in the militia during the War of 1812, later reaching the rank of captain. Howard was defeated when he ran for reelection in 1834 but was later elected in an 1836 by-election held after the results of the general election in Leeds were overturned due to violence at the polls.
