= Christopher Robinson (Upper Canada politician) =

Loyalist soldier and Upper Canada politician (1763–1798)

Christopher Robinson (1763 – November 2, 1798) was a Virginia-born soldier, lawyer and political figure in Upper Canada.

== Early life ==
He was born in Virginia in 1763, the son of Oxford-educated Peter Robinson (ca 1719–1768), and nephew of John Robinson, Speaker of the Virginia House of Burgesses, and loyalist leader Beverley Robinson (ca 1722–1792). He was also a close relation of John Robinson (bishop of London) (1650–1723), a senior Anglican cleric and influential diplomat.

Born in Virginia to one of the British colony's most influential families, it has been contended that he was educated at the College of William and Mary, although no evidence exists to support that fact. In fact, his early life remains shrouded in mystery and genealogical legerdemain. What is known is that at some point after his father's death in 1768, he moved to New York, likely to his cousin Beverley's household and was there at the beginning of the American Revolution. On June 26, 1781, he was commissioned an ensign in the Queen's Rangers under John Graves Simcoe and served through the surrender of the British Army at Yorktown, until 1783.

== Upper Canada ==
He retired at half pay in New Brunswick and settled briefly in Queensbury Parish. While in New Brunswick, Robinson married in 1784 Esther Sayre (b. 1763), daughter of Rev. John Sayre of Philadelphia, who came to the colonies on behalf of the Society for the Propagation of the Gospel. However, Robinson soon moved to Quebec in search of employment. In 1792, Simcoe, now Lieutenant Governor of Upper Canada, offered him a post as a minor surveyor general and he moved to Kingston.

In 1794, he received his licence to practice law. In 1796, he was elected to the 2nd Parliament of Upper Canada representing Ontario & Addington counties. In 1797, he played a role in establishing the Law Society of Upper Canada. A slave owner, in 1797 Robinson sponsored a bill in the Parliament to allow immigrants to bring their slaves with them. The bill passed the Legislative Assembly but was stalled in the Legislative Council and died at the end of the session.

He died suddenly at York (Toronto) in 1798. Robinson was buried at Victoria Memorial Square. William Fairfield took his place in the legislative assembly in June 1799.

== Personal ==
His wife Esther Robinson remarried Elisa Berman in 1803 and died in Newmarket, Ontario in 1827.

His sons included:

- John Beverley, a lawyer, judge and political figure in Upper Canada
- Peter, political figure in who played an important role in promoting immigration from Ireland to Upper Canada
- William Benjamin, a political figure in Upper Canada and Canada West
