= Edward C. Campbell =

Politician and judge in the Province of Canada

Member of the Legislative Assembly of the Province of Canada for Niagara
- In office 1841 – September 1842 (Election overturned)
- Monarch: Victoria
- Governor-General: Lord Sydenham
- Preceded by: Position established
- Succeeded by: Henry John Boulton

Personal details
- Born: 1806
- Died: January 18, 1860 (aged 53–54)
- Party: Tories
- Spouse: Ann Isabella Burns (m. 1830)
- Occupation: Lawyer, judge, political figure

Edward Clarke Campbell (1806 – January 18, 1860) was a lawyer, judge and political figure in Canada West. He represented the town of Niagara (now Niagara-on-the-Lake, Ontario) in the Legislative Assembly of the Province of Canada from 1841 to 1842.

== Biography ==
He was the son of Fort Major Donald Campbell, a native of Argyllshire, Scotland. Campbell studied law with Robert Dickson, later practising in partnership with Dickson. In 1830, he married Ann Isabella Burns.

Campbell stood for election to the first Parliament of the Province of Canada in the general election of March and April, 1841. He was declared the victor by one vote, defeating Henry John Boulton. Campbell took his seat in the Assembly and was considered a moderate Tory. He supported the union of the Canadas, and consistently voted in support of the Governor General, Lord Sydenham.

The election results in Niagara were appealed by means of an election petition to the Legislative Assembly. In September 1842, more than a year after the election and after Campbell had sat in the Assembly for the 1841 session, the Assembly ruled that Boulton had been the victor in the election. The Assembly removed Campbell and installed Bouton as the member for Niagara. Campbell was appointed a judge for the Niagara District court.

Campbell was a successful horticulturist and was president of the local Mechanics' Institute for ten years. He served on the bench until his death from pneumonia in 1860.
