= John Fergusson =

John Fergusson may refer to:

- John Fergusson (politician), Scottish-Canadian politician
- John Duncan Fergusson, Scottish artist and sculptor
- Sir John Fergusson, 1st Baronet (died 1729), of the Fergusson baronets

== See also ==
- John Ferguson (disambiguation)
- Fergusson (disambiguation)
