= Marguerite Duplessis =

Marie-Marguerite Duplessis Radisson (c. 1718 – after 1740) was a Pawnee woman who was enslaved in New France.

Duplessis may have been first enslaved in Iowa by the Winnebago Nation. In 1726 she was given to French trader René Bourassa near Baie-des-Puants (now Green Bay) who in turn gifted the child to Madeline Coulon de Villiers, the widow of François-Antoine Lefebvre Duplessis Faber, who lived in Montreal at the home of Étienne Volant de Radisson, a merchant. In 1735 she was sold to Louis Fornel, and again in 1740 to Marc-Antoine Huart Dormicourt. She was, apparently, not compliant, and Dormicourt complained that she was a libertine, a drunkard, and a thief, and sought to transport her to Martinique.

With the assistance of lawyer Jacques Nouette, Duplessis challenged Dormicourt's authority as her master. On or about 1 October 1740 she presented a petition claiming to be the baptised daughter of Duplessis Faber, and asking the court to recognize that she was a free woman. On 20 October 1740 the court rejected her petition and recognised Huart Dormicourt as her master and owner. Although her appeal for freedom was unsuccessful, she was one of the first enslaved people in New France who succeeded in even having her case heard by a court.

Nothing is known of her after 1740; she was likely sent to labour in Martinique and may not have survived the journey.
