= Chloe Cooley =

Enslaved Canadian whose sale spurred abolitionist sentiment

Chloe Cooley was a young black woman held as a slave in Fort Erie and Queenston, Upper Canada, in the late 18th-century, as the area was being settled by Loyalists from the United States. Her owner forced her into a boat to sell her in 1793 across the Niagara River in the United States.

This incident was observed by several witnesses, who petitioned the Executive Council of Upper Canada. Although charges were dropped against Cooley's owner, the incident is believed to have led to passage of the Act Against Slavery, 1793, in Upper Canada. It prevented slaves from being imported into the province and provided for gradual abolition of slavery within a generation among those held there.

== History ==
External videos
- Chloe Cooley; A Canadian Heritage Minute that follows Cooley in Upper Canada in 1793. Her acts of resistance in the face of violence led to Canada’s first legislation limiting slavery.– Historica Canada (1:01 min)

In 1793, Cooley was held by Loyalist Adam Vrooman, a white farmer and former sergeant with Butler's Rangers who fled to Canada from New York after the American Revolution. He had purchased her several months before from Benjamin Hardison, another Loyalist who lived nearby at what is now Fort Erie, Ontario.

The Crown had explicitly allowed Loyalists to bring their slaves to Canada under an imperial act of Parliament, the Settlers in American Colonies Act 1790 (30 Geo. 3. c. 27). They brought an estimated 2,000 into Canada after the American Revolutionary War, with an estimated 500 to 700 to Upper Canada, markedly increasing the number in the colonies. The Crown encouraged settlement in Upper Canada and the Maritime Provinces after the war, making land grants to compensate for property lost by Loyalists in the new United States. It wanted to develop these areas with English speakers.

There were growing rumours that the government might extend freedom to slaves. Some Black Loyalists, African-American slaves who had been freed by the British after leaving their rebel masters and joining the battle, had also been settled in Upper Canada, but most were resettled in Nova Scotia. The existence of slavery in the new provinces seemed a contradiction to the other rights which were protected for most residents.

Vrooman and other slaveholders feared losing their property rights in slaves, who were legally treated as chattel, and began to sell them off. Fearing that he would be forced to free Cooley, Vrooman arranged a sale to an American across the Niagara River on March 14, 1793. In order to make the sale, Vrooman beat Cooley, tied her up and forced her into a small boat, aided by two other men. He rowed her across the river while she screamed. Peter Martin, a Black Loyalist of Butler's Rangers, witnessed the incident. He brought William Grisely, a white man who had also witnessed the abduction, to make a report to the Executive Council of Upper Canada. Others saw the incident but took no action. Cooley's fate after she was taken across the river remains unknown.

The Executive Council of Upper Canada brought charges against Sergeant Vrooman for disturbing the peace. However, he petitioned against the charges, which were eventually dropped, because Chloe Cooley was considered property.

Lieutenant-Governor of Upper Canada John Graves Simcoe was outraged by the incident and decided to act to prohibit slavery. While at least 12 members of the 25-person government owned slaves or were members of slave-owning families, they offered little opposition to the bill. The Chloe Cooley incident was considered a catalyst in the passage of Canada's first and only anti-slavery legislation: the Act Against Slavery (Its full name is "An Act to Prevent the further Introduction of Slaves and to limit the Term of Contracts for Servitude (also known as the Act to Limit Slavery in Upper Canada)"). Simcoe gave it Royal Assent on July 9, 1793.

== Provisions of the Act ==
It prohibited the importation of slaves into the province. It allowed the sale of slaves within the province and across the border into the United States. The last slave sale known took place in 1824. The law had three classes of persons: those held in slavery at the time of enactment would continue to be the property of their masters for life unless freed. Persons born to slave mothers would be granted freedom at age 25 (at that age they were judged able to support themselves), and masters were encouraged to employ them as indentured servants, for maximum terms up to nine years, which were renewable. Persons born to free blacks would be free from birth.

In 1799 New York State passed a similar law to gradually abolish slavery and forbid any more sales of slaves within its borders. The last slaves in New York were freed in 1827. Other northern states, such as Vermont and Massachusetts, ended the institution earlier.

== Legacy ==
A historical marker was installed by the Ontario Heritage Trust to recognize Cooley near Niagara-on-the-Lake.

Cooley's story was featured in a five-minute documentary The Echoes of Chloe Cooley (2016) by Andrea Conte, entered in a contest for short works. In 2022, a Heritage Minute was released featuring her story.

Cooley was named a National Historic Person on April 27, 2022, on the recommendation of the national Historic Sites and Monuments Board.

Cooley was honored with a postage stamp released by Canada Post in their Black Heritage series on January 30, 2023.
