= Peter Howard (politician) =

Canadian politician

Peter Howard (May 21, 1772 – November 24, 1843) was a farmer, businessman, medical doctor and political figure in Upper Canada.

He was born in Albany County, New York in 1772. His father served with the British during the American Revolution. Peter settled in Elizabethtown Township in Upper Canada. In 1804, he was elected to represent Leeds in the Legislative Assembly of Upper Canada and served until 1812 when he was defeated by Levius Peters Sherwood. In 1806, he was named a justice of the peace in the Johnstown District. In 1808, with Thomas Dorland and David McGregor Rogers, he withdrew from the house to protest an amendment to the District School Act. Later, he tended to support the more radical reformers, such as Joseph Willcocks, in the assembly. In 1816, he was reelected to represent Leeds and served until 1820. He practiced as a doctor after the War of 1812, although he was only licensed to practice medicine in 1830.

He died in Brockville in 1843. He is buried in the Soperton Cemetery near Delta, Ontario.

His son Matthew Munsel also represented Leeds in the Legislative Assembly.
