= Henry John Boulton =

Lawyer, judge and politician in Upper Canada and Newfoundland

Member of the Legislative Assembly of the Province of Canada for Norfolk County
- In office 1848–1851

Member of the Legislative Assembly of the Province of Canada for Niagara
- In office 1842–1844

Chief Justice of Newfoundland
- In office 1833–1838
- Preceded by: Richard Alexander Tucker
- Succeeded by: John Gervase Hutchinson Bourne

Member of the Legislative Assembly of Upper Canada for Niagara
- In office 1830–1833
- Preceded by: Robert Dickson

Attorney General of Upper Canada
- In office 1829–1833
- Preceded by: John Beverley Robinson
- Succeeded by: Robert Sympson Jameson

Solicitor General of Upper Canada
- In office 1818–1829
- Preceded by: John Beverley Robinson

Personal details
- Born: 1790 Kensington, London, England
- Died: June 18, 1870 (age 80) Toronto, Ontario, Canada
- Party: Compact Tory
- Other political affiliations: Ultra-Reformer
- Spouse: Eliza Jones
- Relations: G. D'Arcy Boulton (father); George Strange Boulton (brother); William Henry Boulton (nephew); Ephraim Jones (father-in-law)
- Profession: Lawyer, judge

Henry John Boulton, QC (1790 – June 18, 1870) was a lawyer and political figure in Upper Canada and the Province of Canada, as well as Chief Justice of Newfoundland.

Boulton began his legal career under the tutelage of John Beverly Robinson, one of the leaders of the Family Compact, succeeding Robinson first as Solicitor General of Upper Canada, and then as Attorney General. After election to the Legislative Assembly of Upper Canada in 1830, Boulton opposed William Lyon Mackenzie, who in turn considered him one of the worst supporters of the Family Compact. His opposition to Mackenzie led to his dismissal by the British government from the post of Attorney General, but he was then appointed Chief Justice of Newfoundland, a separate colony from Upper Canada. After a tumultuous term as Chief Justice, he was again dismissed by the British government and returned to Upper Canada.

By the time of his return from Newfoundland, Boulton had become a strong Reformer, supporting Robert Baldwin and the quest for responsible government. At the end of the Baldwin-Lafontaine ministry, he retired from public life and devoted himself to his legal practice.

He died in Toronto, Ontario, in 1870, aged 80.

== Early life and family ==
Boulton was born at Little Holland House, Kensington, England, the son of G. D'Arcy Boulton, in 1790. Some time later, the family settled in New York state and then moved to Upper Canada around 1800. He studied law at York, Upper Canada (now Toronto, Ontario) and then at Lincoln's Inn in London. In 1818, he married Eliza Jones, daughter of Ephraim Jones, a Loyalist who was a member of the Legislative Assembly of Upper Canada, opposed to slavery. The couple would have eight children.

One of Boulton's brothers, George Strange Boulton, was also a member of the Legislative Assembly and served on the Legislative Council. Another brother, D'Arcy Boulton Jr., also a lawyer, built and lived at The Grange, one of the earliest substantial brick residences in York.

== Family Compact member ==
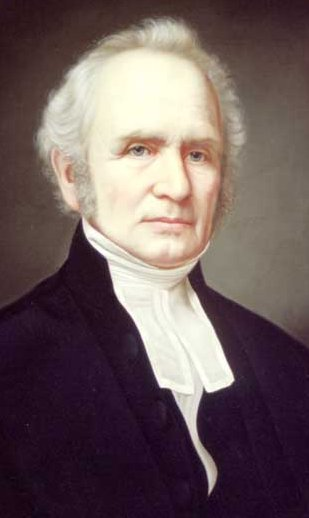
John Beverley Robinson, Family Compact leader

Boulton was called to the English bar and, in 1816, the bar of Upper Canada. He was appointed Solicitor General in 1818, at age 28, and then Attorney General in 1829. The appointments illustrated the nature of the Family Compact.

Boulton's father, D'Arcy Boulton, had been the Solicitor-General of Upper Canada. When he was later appointed Attorney General, John Beverley Robinson succeeded him as Solicitor General. Robinson was the brother-in-law of one of D'Arcy Boulton's sons. When D'Arcy Boulton was appointed to the bench in 1818, Robinson succeeded him as Attorney General and John Henry Boulton was appointed Solicitor General. When Robinson in turn was appointed to the bench in 1829, John Henry Boulton was appointed Attorney General.

The string of appointments indicated the patronage nature of the position under the informal control of the Family Compact. However, even critics of the Family Compact acknowledged that Robinson and the Boultons carried out the office with fairness.

Boulton also served three terms as Treasurer of the Law Society of Upper Canada, the governing body of the legal profession. There was a similar pattern as with the appointments to the position of Solicitor-General and Attorney General. Boulton's father, D'Arcy Boulton, had served two terms as Treasurer (1806–1811 and 1815–1818). When D'Arcy Boulton was appointed to the bench, Robinson became Treasurer (1818–1819). Robinson was followed the next year by Boulton (1819–1820). Robinson served a second term in 1821–1822, and then was again followed by Boulton (1822–1824). Boulton's third term as Treasurer was over twenty years later, in 1846–1847.

While he was Solicitor-General, Boulton ended up being charged with being an accessory to a duel, which also illustrated the pervasiveness of politics at that time. The matter arose in early 1828, when a Reform journalist, Francis Collins, was prosecuted by Attorney-General Robinson for libellous utterances in his newspaper. The case came on before Justice Willis, who was an opponent of the government. Collins attacked the prosecution, arguing that Robinson had failed to do his duty by not prosecuting his colleague, Boulton, for having acted as a second at a duel some years before. Justice Willis seized on this allegation and turned the case into a prosecution of Boulton, with Robert Baldwin, then a young leader of the budding Reform movement, acting as prosecutor. The matter became entirely political and ended when the Lieutenant Governor, Sir Peregrine Maitland, dismissed Justice Willis.

During his tenure as Solicitor-General, Boulton wrote a short book to encourage working-class British to consider emigrating to Canada.

== Member of the Legislative Assembly ==
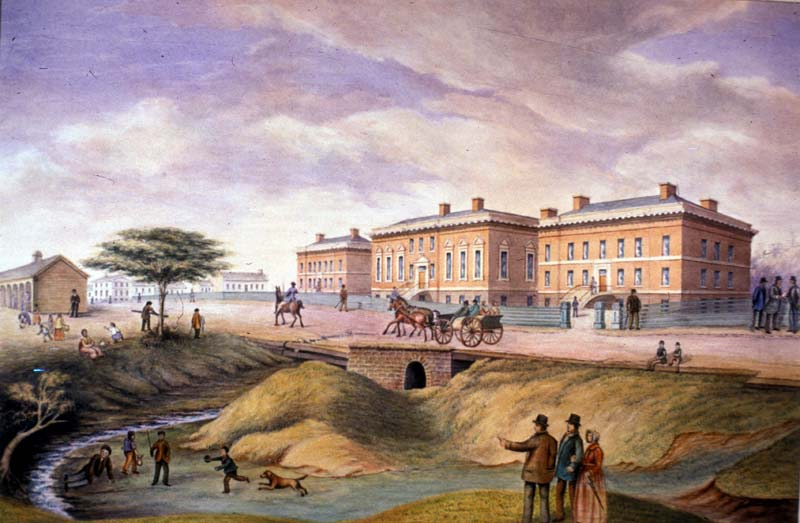
Upper Canada Parliament Building in York, built between 1829 and 1832

In 1830, Boulton was elected to represent Niagara in the Legislative Assembly of Upper Canada. Although he campaigned as an independent, Reformers considered him a "ministerialist", a supporter of the Tories. In his capacity as Attorney General, he was involved in several disputes with members of the growing Reform movement, to the point that William Lyon Mackenzie, one of the leading Reformers, put Boulton at the head of his "Black Book" of corrupt officials. Mackenzie described Boulton and his brother George Strange Boulton, "as bad as bad can be, perhaps the very worst members any country or nation can be afflicted with."

While a member of the Assembly, John Henry Boulton instigated several expulsions of William Lyon Mackenzie from the assembly, based on Mackenzie's radical Reform views. In 1832, Lord Goderich, the Colonial Secretary, directed the provincial administration to stop attacking Mackenzie. Boulton continued his attacks on Mackenzie and in 1833 was dismissed from his position of Attorney General.

Boulton publicly contested his dismissal, publishing his correspondence with the secretary to the Lieutenant Governor of the province, and seeking a public statement for the reasons for his dismissal. He maintained that the Lieutenant Governor had never informed him of the Colonial Secretary's direction to stop attacking Mackenzie. Boulton also travelled to Britain and argued his case with the British government, which ultimately acknowledged that he had been improperly dismissed. In compensation, the British government appointed him as Chief Justice of the colony of Newfoundland.

== Chief Justice of Newfoundland ==
Boulton arrived in Newfoundland in November 1833. The position of Chief Justice was a difficult one, because the Chief Justice was also the president of the Council, which had both legislative and executive functions. Although Boulton's predecessor had been dismissed for mixing his political duties with his legislative duties, it was difficult to avoid doing so.

Boulton introduced a new system of selecting juries based on the method then used in England. He was instrumental in the passage of legislation to create a law society for Newfoundland, as well as regulations governing the admission of new lawyers to the bar. He also amended a number of traditional arrangements regarding credit in the fishing industry. Many of these changes were not well received, leading to criticisms from Reform members of the Assembly.

In 1835, Boulton was caricatured for his opening address to the grand jury. He found the author of the caricature, Robert John Parsons, in contempt of court, fined him £50, and sentenced him to three months in jail. After the matter was raised in the British Parliament, the British government concluded that while Boulton had the legal authority for these actions, the “practice for many years . . . of this country was against him”, and remitted the sentence. Two years later, Boulton instituted a libel action against three members of the Assembly who had criticised his conduct in office. The case was never heard.

Boulton was considered notorious by locals and was monikered "the hanging judge." In one particular instance, he sentenced an English servant boy accused of the murder of a woman and two children to an indefinite prison sentence, despite there being no evidence whatsoever against him. Within a year a large crowd marched on the courthouse and the boy was promptly freed.

In 1837, a delegation from the Assembly went to London to seek Boulton's removal. They had a favourable reception from the Colonial Office. Boulton also went to London to defend himself, armed with depositions and statements in support from his assistant judges, a registrar and a sheriff of the court, the St John's Chamber of Commerce, over 900 residents of St John's, and numerous merchants and lawyers. The British government referred the matter to a committee of the Privy Council for a recommendation. In its report, the committee criticised the Reform members of the Assembly for the vehemence of the language they used in their petitions, and held that there was no evidence of corruption or improper conduct by Boulton in his conduct as a judge. The committee did, however, criticise him for getting involved in party politics in Newfoundland, and recommended his dismissal. The Colonial Secretary had already personally decided that Boulton should be removed, and in early 1838, Boulton was dismissed from office.

== Reform supporter ==
Boulton returned to private practice in Toronto and was appointed a Queen's Counsel in 1842.

In 1841 he stood for election to the 1st Parliament of the Province of Canada in his old constituency of Niagara. In spite of his previous support for the Tories, he ran as a Reformer. After a close-fought election, the returning officer declared that his Tory opponent, Edward Campbell, had been elected. Boulton's supporters challenged the election by means of an election petition to the Legislative Assembly. In 1842, over a year after the election, the Assembly ruled that Boulton had been elected, not Edwards. Boulton was installed as a member of the Assembly.

Once in Parliament, Boulton aligned himself with the ultra-Reformers led by Robert Baldwin. He declared in favour of responsible government, commenting that his "considerable experience of Colonial Office Government" had persuaded him that the Canadian people should have complete management over local affairs. His support of the Reformers resulted in his defeat in the general election of 1844, but in the general election of 1847, he was elected in Norfolk County.

One of Boulton's major acts of support as a friend of the ministry was in relation to the Rebellion Losses Bill. The Lafontaine-Baldwin ministry had proposed the bill, to compensate individuals who had their property damaged or lost during the Rebellion of 1837–38. The bill had strong support amongst the French-speaking inhabitants of Lower Canada (Canada East). However, it aroused strong opposition among many English-speaking residents of both Canada East and Upper Canada (Canada West), because there had been substantial popular support in Lower Canada for the rebellion. Many English-speaking Canadians saw the bill as compensating those who had supported the Rebellion.

Boulton proposed an amendment to the bill which provided that no-one who had been convicted of treason, or had pled guilty and had been transported to Bermuda, would be eligible for benefits under the bill. This provision received strong support from the French-Canadian members, although opposed by Louis-Joseph Papineau, for apparently affirming the validity of the special courts that had been set up to try individuals accused of assisting in the Rebellion. The amendment helped convince moderate Reformers in Canada West to vote for the bill, which passed with majorities from both the English-speaking and the French-speaking members of the Assembly.

Towards the end of the Lafontaine-Baldwin ministry, Boulton began to drift away from them, proclaiming himself an independent member. He moved towards the nascent "Clear Grit" movement, of more radical Reformers, increasingly voting against the government. He argued that the Legislative Council should be elected, not appointed, and effectively proposed "rep by pop" (representation by population), in accordance with the growing population of Canada West.

== Later life ==
Boulton did not stand for election in the general election of 1851. He retired from politics but continued to practise law until about 1860. In 1855, he was the manager of the Canadian section at the Paris Exposition.

He died at Toronto, Ontario in 1870.

== Publications ==
Boulton, Henry John (1826). A short sketch of the province of Upper Canada, for the information of the labouring poor throughout England, to Which Is Prefixed Thoughts on Colonization, Addressed to the Labouring Poor, the Clergy, Select Vestries, and Overseers of the Poor, and Other Persons, Interested in the Administration of Parish Relief in the Different Parishes in England. London: John Murray.
