= Niagara (Province of Canada electoral district) =

Niagara Canada West
Province of Canada electoral district

Defunct pre-Confederation electoral district
- Legislature: Legislative Assembly of the Province of Canada
- District created: 1841
- District abolished: 1867
- First contested: 1841
- Last contested: 1863

Niagara was an electoral district of the Legislative Assembly of the Parliament of the Province of Canada, in Canada West (now Ontario). It was created in 1841, upon the establishment of the Province of Canada by the union of Upper Canada and Lower Canada. Niagara was represented by one member in the Legislative Assembly. It was abolished in 1867, upon the creation of Canada and the province of Ontario.

== Boundaries ==
Niagara electoral district was based largely on the municipal boundaries of the town of Niagara, located at the mouth of the Niagara River where it flows into Lake Ontario. Niagara was the major centre of the electoral district.

The Union Act, 1840 had merged the two provinces of Upper Canada and Lower Canada into the Province of Canada, with a single Parliament. The separate parliaments of Lower Canada and Upper Canada were abolished. The Union Act provided that the town of Niagara would constitute one electoral district in the Legislative Assembly of the new Parliament, but gave the Governor General of the Province of Canada the power to draw the boundaries for the electoral district.

The first Governor General, Lord Sydenham, issued a proclamation shortly after the formation of the Province of Canada in early 1841, establishing the boundaries for the electoral district:

The Town of Niagara, shall be bounded and limited as follows:—commencing at Massessagua Point; thence westerly along Lake Ontario, to Crookston; thence along the rear or town line of Niagara, to the Black Swamp; and thence along the eastern limit of the lands of the late Thomas Butler, Esquire, deceased, and the lands of Garret Slingert, and to the north-west angle of the lands of John Eccleston; thence easterly to where the lands of William Dickson, Esquire, and the late Martin MacLennon, deceased, come in contact; thence east along the northern boundary of the lands of the said Martin MacLennon, deceased, to the River Niagara; thence northerly down said Niagara River, to the place of beginning.

== Members of the Legislative Assembly ==
Niagara was represented by one member in the Legislative Assembly. The following were the members for Niagara.

Parliament	Years	Members	Party
1st Parliament; 1841–1844	1841 Election overturned (Note: Election of Edwards overturned by the Legislative Assembly on an election petition, September 26, 1842; Campbell removed from office and Boulton installed as member.)	Edward C. Campbell	Unionist; Moderate Tory
1st Parliament; 1841–1844	1841–1844	Henry John Boulton	Unionist; Ultra Reformer

== Abolition ==
Niagara electoral district was abolished on July 1, 1867, when the British North America Act, 1867 came into force, creating Canada and splitting the Province of Canada into Quebec and Ontario. It was succeeded by the electoral districts of Niagara in both the House of Commons of Canada and the Legislative Assembly of Ontario.
