= Benjamin Fairfield =

Shipowner, merchant, and politician in Upper Canada

Benjamin Fairfield (1772 – May 9, 1842) was a shipowner, merchant and political figure in Upper Canada.

He was born in Charlotte County, Vermont, in 1772, the son of a United Empire Loyalist. He went to Quebec with his family, who later settled in Ernestown Township after the American Revolution. With his brothers, he was involved in shipbuilding, mills, and supplying goods to the militia. He represented Lennox and Addington in the Legislative Assembly of Upper Canada from 1812 to 1816; his older brother William had earlier served as a member of the assembly. In 1818, he was named justice of the peace in the Midland District. He served in the local militia becoming captain in 1826. He died in Bath, Canada West in 1842.
