= Walter Butler Wilkinson =

Upper Canada politician

Walter Butler Wilkinson (1781 – September 1807) was a political figure in Upper Canada.

He was born in 1781, the son of Richard Norton Wilkinson. He studied law, was called to the bar, and settled in Cornwall. In 1804, he was elected to represent Glengarry and Prescott in the 4th Parliament of Upper Canada. He died in 1807 while still in office.
