= John Ferguson (footballer, born 1931) =

Australian rules footballer

Personal information
- Full name: John Ferguson
- Born: 12 May 1931
- Original team: Richmond Tech
- Height: 189 cm (6 ft 2 in)
- Weight: 89 kg (196 lb)
- Position: Ruck

Playing career^{1}
Years	Club	Games (Goals)
1951–54	Melbourne	15 (6)
1955–57	South Melbourne	25 (4)
Total		40 (10)
- ^{1} Playing statistics correct to the end of 1957.

John Ferguson (born 12 May 1931) is a former Australian rules footballer who played with Melbourne and South Melbourne in the Victorian Football League (VFL).
