= David Cowan (politician) =

Scottish politician, naval officer, ship's captain and gardener (1742–1808)

- Born: 1742
- Died: 24 September 1808 (aged 65–66)
- Occupations: Farmer, naval officer, ship's captain, ferry operator and political figure in Upper Canada

David Cowan (1742 – 24 September 1808) was a Scottish farmer, naval officer, ship's captain, ferry operator and political figure in Upper Canada. He represented Essex County in the Legislative Assembly of Upper Canada from 1804 to 1808.

He was born in Lanarkshire and emigrated to the Thirteen Colonies in 1770, serving as gardener for George Washington at Mount Vernon. Cowan served as a lieutenant in the Royal Navy during the American Revolution and went on to serve in the Provincial Marine for Upper Canada, commanding ships on the Great Lakes. He lived in Fort Erie and then Amherstburg. Cowan also owned property in Kingston.

Cowan is credited with bringing the first apple trees to the state of Michigan in 1796, a variety similar to the Red Calville which he brought to Detroit.

Cowan died on board the Camden in Fort Erie harbour.
