= Angus MacDonell =

Canadian politician

Angus MacDonell (ca 1751–1817?) was a soldier and political figure in Upper Canada.

He was born at Sandaig in Inverness-shire Scotland around 1751. He came to North America with General Simon Fraser's 71st Regiment which fought for the British in the American Revolution. MacDonell was an ensign when the regiment assembled in 1776, he reached the rank of lieutenant. He appears to have been taken prisoner at Yorktown, Virginia and returned to Britain.

In 1786, he returned to Canada and received a grant of land in Charlottenburgh Township. He represented Glengarry & Prescott in the 3rd Parliament of Upper Canada. Later, he is believed to have become a fur trader and left the area.

He was married to a Ms Bellêtre from Montreal and had at least one son, John Bellêtre Macdonell. He continued to receive his half pay pension until 1817.
