= Thomas Scott (Canadian judge) =

Canadian politician (1746–1824)

4th Treasurer of the Law Society of Upper Canada
- In office 1805–1806
- Preceded by: Angus Macdonell
- Succeeded by: D'Arcy Boulton

Personal details
- Born: October 18, 1746 Kingoldrum, Angus, Scotland
- Died: July 29, 1824 (aged 77) York, Upper Canada

Thomas Scott (baptised 18 October 1746 – July 29, 1824) was a judge and political figure in Upper Canada.

He was born in the parish of Kingoldrum, Angus, Scotland, and studied law at Lincoln's Inn in London. He was called to the bar in 1793. In 1800, he was appointed attorney general in Upper Canada and arrived in York in 1801. He prosecuted the case of Mary Osborn, the first woman to be executed in Upper Canada, in August of that year.

In 1805, Scott was appointed to the Executive Council for the province. He was the fourth Treasurer of the Law Society of Upper Canada from 1805 until he became Chief Justice for Upper Canada succeeding Henry Allcock and was appointed to the Executive Council in 1806.

In 1811, already suffering from ill health, Scott applied for a pension so that he could retire, but was refused. During the War of 1812, the administration sought to ensure the loyalty of its subjects by imposing martial law and, in 1814, by prosecuting those who had expressed sympathy for the enemy with treason in a series of trials at Ancaster known as the "Bloody Assize". Fifteen men were condemned to death of which eight were executed. These actions increased Scott's workload.

In 1816, Scott was finally granted a pension and retired. He was succeeded by William Dummer Powell as Chief Justice for the province. Scott died at York (Toronto) in 1824.

- Scott Township in Ontario County, Ontario, now part of Uxbridge, was named after Scott.
- Scott Street (and Scott Lane) in the St. Lawrence neighbourhood of Toronto are also named after Thomas Scott.

Legal offices
Preceded by Henry Allcock; 1802–1806	Chief Justice of Upper Canada; 1806–1816	Succeeded by William Dummer Powell
