= Robert Nelles =

Canadian politician (1761–1842)

Robert Nelles (October 6, 1761 – July 27, 1842) was a businessman and political figure in Upper Canada.

He was born in Stone Arabia, now known as Nelliston, in Tryon County, New York in 1761. His father, Hendrick William Nelles, served in the Indian Department from 1759-1760, during the French and Indian War and his grandfather, William Nelles, arrived in New York in 1710, and enlisted in the colonial forces for the Quebec Expedition in 1711. Robert was made a lieutenant in the department in 1780 and served during the American Revolution, leading around 60 raids into the interior of New York state in 1781. After the war, father and son settled in the Grand River valley as United Empire Loyalists and received several large land grants in the Niagara District. Nelles built mills and a store on the current site of the town of Grimsby. He also built an early Georgian style manor, which was completed in 1798 (now Nelles Manor Museum).

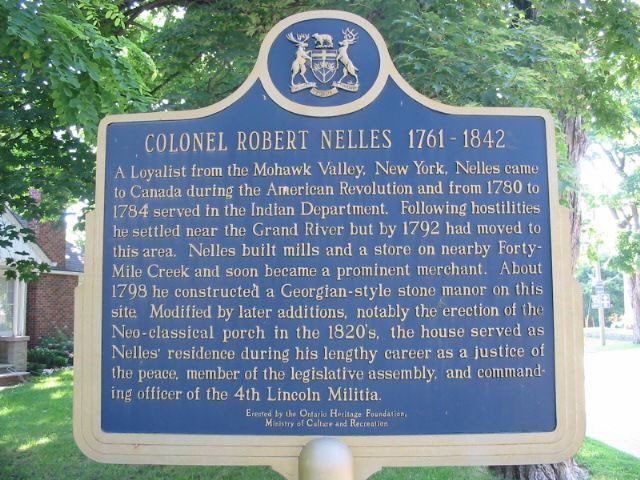
Sign in front of Nelles Manor

In 1797, Nelles was appointed Indian agent in the region for a brief time. In 1800, he was elected to the Legislative Assembly of Upper Canada in West York, 1st Lincoln & Haldimand and served until 1808. In 1801, he was called as a witness in the case of Mary Osborn, the first woman to be executed in Upper Canada.

Nelles joined the local militia during the War of 1812, eventually becoming lieutenant-colonel. In 1814, he replaced Joseph Willcocks in the legislative assembly in a by-election for 1st Lincoln and Haldimand, serving until 1820.

There are a number of places named after the Nelles family in Grimsby, namely Nelles Public School, Nelles Beach Park, Nelles Boulevard, Nelles Road (North and South), the Nelles Fitch House, and Nelles Manor.

He died in Grimsby in 1842.

== Personal life ==
Robert married Elizabeth Moore in 1788. She was the daughter of John Moore and Dinah Pettit, who were United Empire Loyalists in New Jersey. With Elizabeth, Robert had seven children:

- Henry Nelles (December 8, 1789 - July 22, 1841)
- Margaret Dinah Nelles (December 12, 1793 - November 22, 1862)
- Robert Nelles II (November 13, 1798 - November 2, 1812)
- William Robert Nelles (December 19, 1800 - March 13, 1839)
- Elizabeth Augusta Nelles (June 11, 1803 - December 9, 1880)
- Abraham Nelles (December 25, 1805 - December 20, 1884) great grandfather of Percy W. Nelles
- Mary Ann Nelles (April 19, 1808 - April 27, 1886)
- George Nelles (December 5, 1810 - April 19, 1883)

Robert's second wife, Maria nee Waddell Bingle (May 9, 1783 - Jan 2, 1848) was a widow. She had two children from her first marriage: Thomas and Catherine Bingle. Together with Robert, Maria had another six children:

- Jane Clare Nelles (July 4, 1815 - April 4, 1890)
- Frances Matilda Nelles (September 21, 1817 - February 15, 1880)
- Charles Lenox Nelles (March 6, 1819 - August 23, 1886)
- Sarah Maria Nelles (May 1, 1821 - June 12, 1823)
- Emilia Maria Nelles (July 23, 1823 - September 9, 1914)
- Robert Waddell Nelles (September 25, 1825 - October 23, 1825)
