= McRuer commission =

Royal commission in Ontario, Canada

The McRuer commission, officially the Royal Commission Inquiry into Civil Rights, was a royal commission conducted in Ontario, Canada, headed by James Chalmers McRuer.

Premier John Robarts asked McRuer to head the commission. Robarts made his request after his government had introduced, and then quickly retracted, a bill dubbed the "police state bill" that would have allowed the Ontario Police Commission (now the Ontario Civilian Police Commission) to "force anyone to give evidence in secret or be jailed indefinitely if they refused". This proposal was deeply unpopular. Arthur Wishart, the province's new attorney-general after Frederick Cass (who had introduced the bill) was removed from the justice portfolio, recommended that the government appoint a royal commission on civil rights in response to the outcry.

McRuer was appointed as commissioner on May 21, 1964, effective retroactively to May 1. The commission's terms of reference instructed him to examine any Ontario law that might affect individual rights or freedoms and to recommend changes to the law to strengthen its protections for civil rights.

The commission made its report between 1968 and 1971. It heard evidence from hundreds of witnesses and its report extended to over 2,200 pages. Its report was published in five volumes and three parts.

According to legal scholar David J. Mullan, the commission was "undoubtedly one of the watersheds in the evolution of Ontario administrative law and, indeed, the administrative law of Canada". It recommended that judicial review of administrative action in Ontario be available in more circumstances and that executive power under statute be curtailed. In particular, the McRuer report recommended that official discretion be limited by statute and that statutes enumerate the factors officials must consider in exercising their discretion. With respect to delegated legislation, McRuer recommended that the provincial cabinet or a minister be able to disallow any regulation made by a subordinate official.

Ontario's Judicial Review Procedure Act, RSO 1990, c J.1, was based on the McRuer report's recommendations.

== Sources ==
- Boyer, J. Patrick (1994). A Passion for Justice: The Legacy of James Chalmers McRuer. University of Toronto Press; Osgoode Society for Canadian Legal History. ISBN 0-8020-0656-6. OCLC 32012392.
- Mullan, David J. (1974). "Reform of Judicial Review of Administrative Action: The Ontario Way". Osgoode Hall Law Journal. 12 (1): 125–178.
- Mullan, David J. (2005). "Willis v. McRuer: A Long-Overdue Replay with the Possibility of a Penalty Shoot-Out". University of Toronto Law Journal. 55 (3): 535–574. ISSN 0042-0220. JSTOR 4491658.
