= John Ferguson (footballer, born 1949) =

Australian rules footballer

Personal information
- Full name: John Ferguson
- Born: 19 March 1949 (age 77)
- Original team: Oakleigh Districts
- Height: 185 cm (6 ft 1 in)
- Weight: 76 kg (168 lb)

Playing career^{1}
| Years | Club | Games (Goals) |
| 1969 | Richmond | 7 (0) |
- ^{1} Playing statistics correct to the end of 1969.

John Ferguson (born 19 March 1949) is a former Australian rules footballer who played with Richmond in the Victorian Football League (VFL).
