= John Ferguson (footballer, born 1891) =

Scottish footballer (1891–1916)

Personal information
- Full name: John Ferguson
- Date of birth: 1891
- Place of birth: Glasgow, Scotland
- Date of death: 23 October 1916 (aged 24)
- Place of death: near Flers, France
- Positions: Right half; inside right

Senior career*
| Years | Team | Apps | (Gls) |
| 1912–1913 | St Bernard's | 22 | (0) |
| 1913–1914 | Third Lanark | 31 | (5) |
- * Club domestic league appearances and goals

John Ferguson (1891 – 23 October 1916) was a Scottish professional footballer who played as a right half in the Scottish League for Third Lanark and St Bernard's.

== Personal life ==
Ferguson was born in Glasgow and brought up by an aunt in Aberfoyle. He attended Callander High School and the University of Edinburgh. Ferguson served as a second lieutenant in the Cameronians (Scottish Rifles) during the First World War and was mentioned in despatches. He was killed by a grenade near Flers during the Battle of Le Transloy on 23 October 1916, in an action his Captain believed was worthy of a posthumous Victoria Cross. Ferguson is commemorated on the Thiepval Memorial.
