= Timothy Thompson =

Loyalist soldier, Upper Canada politician, judge and militia officer

Timothy Thompson (1762 – April 23, 1823) was a judge and political figure in Upper Canada.

He served with the British army during the American Revolution. After the war, he settled in South Fredericksburgh Township, Ontario. He was elected to the 2nd Parliament of Upper Canada in 1796 representing Lennox, Hastings and Northumberland counties. In 1798, he became a judge in the Midland District court. In 1801, he was appointed collector of customs for the port of Newcastle and, in 1802, he became judge in the Newcastle District. He represented Lennox and Addington counties in the Legislative Assembly from 1800 to 1804 and from 1812 to 1816. He served as a lieutenant-colonel in the Lennox militia during the War of 1812.
