= Thomas Smith (Upper Canada politician) =

Land surveyor, merchant and political figure in Upper Canada

Thomas Smith (1754 – March 3, 1833) was a land surveyor, merchant and political figure in Upper Canada. He represented Kent in the Legislative Assembly of Upper Canada from 1796 to 1800.

He was born in Wales. Smith settled in Sandwich in Upper Canada. From 1776 to 1777, he served as a captain in the Indian Department and later was a captain in the militia for Essex County. Smith also served as a justice of the peace for the Western District and a clerk in the Court of Common Pleas for the Hesse District. He died in Sandwich.
