= William Fairfield =

Upper Canada politician

William Fairfield (c. 1769 – February 6, 1816) was a businessman and political figure in Upper Canada.

He was born in Pawlet, Vermont in 1769 or 1770, the son of William Fairfield, a farmer. His father fought with Edward Jessup's loyalist forces and moved with his family to Machiche (Yamachiche) in Quebec in 1779. In 1784, they settled west of Kingston, near the current location of Amherstview.

The younger Fairfield, in charge of a mill, built his own home in the village of Ernestown (Bath) in 1796. He was a justice of the peace and became a member of the Legislative Assembly of Upper Canada representing Ontario & Addington in 1799, replacing Christopher Robinson, who had died the previous year. His views tended to be more liberal and he was involved in establishing the Ernestown Academy in 1811.

Together with his brothers Benjamin and Stephen, he had interests in mills, shipbuilding and the sale of goods.

He died of fever and an inflamed liver in Ernestown in 1816.
