= Richard Norton Wilkinson =

Loyalist soldier and Upper Canada politician

Richard Norton Wilkinson (??-1804) was a soldier, judge and political figure in Upper Canada.

He was born in Scotland. At the time of the American Revolution, he was a merchant in Albany, New York and owned a ship. His ship and cargo were seized and he was imprisoned by the colonists. He escaped and served with Sir John Johnson's King's Royal Regiment of New York. In 1778, he was appointed to the Indian Department. He served as captain in the Royal Canadian Volunteers until 1802. In 1788, he was appointed justice of the peace in the Lunenburg District. In 1794, he was appointed justice in the Eastern District court. He represented Glengarry in the Legislative Assembly of the Province of Canada from 1796 to 1800.

He died at Cornwall in 1804.

His son Walter Butler was also a member of the Legislative Assembly but died only a few years after his father.
