= John White (Frontenac County) =

Lawyer and politician in Upper Canada (c.1761–1800)

1st Treasurer of the Law Society of Upper Canada
- In office 1797–1798
- Preceded by: none
- Succeeded by: Robert Isaac Dey Gray

Personal details
- Born: 1761 Hicks Hall, Middlesex, England
- Died: January 4, 1800 York, Upper Canada
- Profession: Lawyer, politician, government minister

John White (c. 1761 – January 4, 1800) was a lawyer and politician in Upper Canada. He was the first Attorney General for Upper Canada. He wrote and was responsible for the legislation of the new Province, which stemmed from the partition of Quebec in the Constitutional Act of 1791. His Act to limit slavery, which relied on Christian argument, was the first such enactment ever in the world.

== Early life and journey to Upper Canada ==
He was born at Hicks Hall, Middlesex, England the son of John White.

He studied at the Inner Temple in London and was called to the bar in 1785. He was recommended to William Osgoode by his friend and brother-in-law Samuel Shepherd as a possible attorney general for Upper Canada and was appointed in 1791. Samuel Shepherd had married his sister, Elizabeth White in 1783.

He arrived in 1792 at Kingston, where he was elected to the 1st Parliament of Upper Canada as the member for Leeds & Frontenac. He moved to Newark (Niagara-on-the-Lake), where the government was located in September of the same year.

== Later life and death ==
As attorney general for the province, he wrote the bill in 1793 which barred the introduction of additional slaves, and the legislation which established trial by jury, district courts and Court of the King's Bench. White played an important role in founding the Law Society of Upper Canada in 1797 and was its first treasurer.

The introduction and passage of the 1793 act against slavery was not without opposition. Four of the original sixteen members of the Legislative Assembly were slave owners: John McDonell, Hazelton Spencer, Peter Van Alstine and David William Smith, and a significant number of landowners. Nine members of the Legislative Council, some of whom were also Executive Councillors, were slave owners or members of slave-owning families. White wrote that there was "much opposition but little argument" to his bill.

As a result of an affair with the wife of John Small, the clerk of the Executive Council of Upper Canada, White was challenged by Small to a duel in York on January 2, 1800. He was shot and died two days later. He lived beyond his means and was often in debt, and his estate went unsettled for 37 years.

== Legislation ==
Legislation passed during the first four years of his tenure includes:

- "An Act to establish Trials by Jury" (1792, c.2)
- "An Act to establish Winchester Measure etc." (1792, c.3)
- "An Act to establish... [Small Claims] Courts..." (1792, c.4)
- "An Act for the more early and speedy recovery of small debts" (1792, c.6)
- "An act to regulate the Toll taken in Mills" (1792, c.7)
- "An Act for building a Gaol and Court House in every district throughout this Province" (1792, c.8)
- "An Act for the better regulation of the Militia in this Province" (1793, c.1)
- "An Act ... for the Nomination ... of Town Officers..." (1793, c.2)
- "An Act ... to collect Rates, ... and for the Payment of Wages to the Members of the House of Assembly" (1793, c.3)
- "An Act to regulate... the Public Highways and Roads..." (1793, c.4)
- "An act... for the Solemnisation of Marriages..." (1793, c.5)
- "An act to fix the times... of holding the Courts of Quarter Sessions..." (1793, c.6)
- "An act to prevent the further introduction of Slaves, and to limit the Terms of contracts for Servitude within this Province" (1793, c.7)
- "An act to encourage the destroying of Wolves and Bears in different parts of the Province" (1793, c.9)
- "An act to provide for the Appointment of Returning Officers..." (1793, c.10)
- "An act for the regulation of Juries" (1794, c.1)
- "An act to establish the Superior Court of Civil and Criminal Justice..." (1794, c.2)
- "An act to authorise the Governor... to licence Practitioners in the Law" (1794, c.4)
- "An act for the further Regulation of the Militia..." (1794, c.7)
- "An act to restrain... Horned Cattle, Horses, Sheep and Swine to run at large" (1794, c.8)
- "An act to lay and collect a Duty upon Stills" (1794, c.11)
- "An act for ... licencing of Public Houses..." (1794, c.12)
- "An act to regulate the Practice of Physic and Surgery" (1795, c.1)
- "An act to ascertain the Eligibility ... [for] the House of Assembly" (1795, c.2)
- "An act for the public registering of Deeds, Conveyances, Wills and other..." (1795, c.5)

Preceded by none	Attorney General of Upper Canada; 1791–1800	Succeeded by Robert Isaac Dey Gray - acting AG
Preceded by none	Treasurer of the Law Society of Upper Canada; 1797–1798	Succeeded by Robert Isaac Dey Gray
