= George Strange Boulton =

Canadian politician

George Strange Boulton

George Strange Boulton (September 11, 1797 – February 13, 1869) was a lawyer and political figure in Upper Canada.

== Life and career ==
He was born near Albany, New York, in 1797, the son of D’Arcy Boulton, and came to York, Upper Canada with his family around 1800. He studied at John Strachan's school in Cornwall. He served during the War of 1812. In 1818, he was called to the bar and began work as a lawyer in Port Hope.

In 1824, he was appointed registrar for Northumberland County and he moved to Cobourg, the county seat. At the start of the 1837 rebellion, he became a member of the militia.

He was first elected to the Legislative Assembly of Upper Canada for Durham in 1824; his election was declared invalid in 1825. In 1830, he was elected in Durham and represented it in the legislative assembly until 1841. He was a loyal Conservative and supported the expulsion of William Lyon Mackenzie from the assembly. In 1847, he was appointed to the Legislative Council of the Province of Canada.

He died in Cobourg, Ontario, in 1869. His brother, Henry John Boulton, was Attorney General in Upper Canada.
