= Jack Ferguson (footballer) =

Australian rules footballer

Personal information
- Full name: Jack Ferguson
- Born: 21 July 1901
- Died: 10 October 1966 (aged 65)
- Original team: Williamstown Fire Brigade

Playing career^{1}
Years	Club	Games (Goals)
1926–1928	South Melbourne	20 (6)
- ^{1} Playing statistics correct to the end of 1928.

Jack Ferguson (21 July 1901 – 10 October 1966) was an Australian rules footballer who played with South Melbourne in the Victorian Football League (VFL).
