= John McGregor (Upper Canada politician) =

Canadian politician

John McGregor (c. 1751 – February 12, 1828) was a businessman and political figure in Upper Canada.

McGregor was born in Scotland around 1751 and came to Detroit in 1784. When the British withdrew from that area, he moved to Old Sandwich Town, now part of Windsor, Ontario, in 1796. He received a city lot in Sandwich at #4 Russell Street where he lived for the remainder of his life. He became a merchant there in partnership with his cousin, James McGregor (Merchant) and had a boat built to transport grain. He later took over a gristmill from Thomas Clark in 1810 when Clark defaulted on a loan. In 1800, he was appointed justice of the peace in the Western District. He was elected to the Legislative Assembly of Upper Canada for Kent in 1804 and re-elected twice more, in 1808 and 1812. His large paper certificate dated June 20, 1808, and signed by seven prominent Kent County men survives and is located in the Canada Archives in Box MG 19A4 #45 of the Askin Papers. During this time, he also served as road commissioner for the Western District. In the war of 1812-14 (at the time referred to as "The Second American War") some of his supplies were stolen by American troops and he agreed to sell them grain while they occupied Sandwich as, in all likelihood, they would have taken it anyway. He apparently received nothing more than a promissory note. The British Army also used wood from his houses for firewood. Two of his mills were burned to prevent them from falling into the hands of the Americans. In 1815, he was accused of collaborating with the enemy due to his sale of supplies to them. After he was cleared, he received compensation for some of his losses and was able to reestablish his business, including a distillery.

Around 1809, he owned a farm on the Thames River Lot #20 in Dover Township, Kent County, Ontario. He rented this farm to another man named John McGregor, a military man with a large family that grew to 13 children and a wife named Mary McMillian. Due to this rental relationship, many historians combine the events of these two men into a single person. On April 16, 1816, Captain John McGregor sold the 200 acre farm he owned to Merchant John McGregor for 175 pounds. This farm is located in Walsingham Township, in Norfolk County, Ontario. Confirmation of this sale can be found in the Ontario Archives, reel #GS2587, land record #1062 on page 504.

McGregor married Martha Scott, had seven children, and died in Amherstburg, Ontario, on February 12, 1828. His death notice was published in the UC Gazette four days later. His will, #57, is located in the Ontario Archives on reel #MS638. His eldest son Alexander died on February 7, 1831, and John McGregor's will was then probated by his second son Duncan and George Jacobs, both of Chatham, Ontario.

On October 10, 1821, he was sworn in as a J.P. at the Court House in Sandwich and served in session during that year through to December 31, 1821. He continued to serve the court every year until January 1827, when he sat on just two occasions, as detailed in the Ontario Archives, Court Record Book RG-22 S102 Volume #1.
