= Benjamin Hardison =

Upper Canada politician and slave owner

Benjamin Hardison (1761 – July 1823) was a farmer, miller and political figure in Upper Canada. He represented 4th Lincoln and Norfolk in the Legislative Assembly of Upper Canada from 1797 to 1800.

He was born in Berwick in the Thirteen Colonies. Hardison served with American forces during the American Revolution, was taken prisoner and sent to Canada, later settling at Fort Erie in Bertie Township. He was a captain in the militia and a justice of the peace for the Niagara District. He operated mills and a distillery at Fort Erie. Hardison died there after purchasing a share of a mill with James Kerby earlier in 1823.

He at one point owned a black woman named Chloe Cooley as a slave before selling her to Adam Vrooman. Her eventual sale by Vrooman to the United States led to the passage of the Act Against Slavery.
