= John P. Ferguson =

American politician in Delaware

John P. Ferguson was an American politician in the Delaware House of Representatives. He was elected with no opposing candidates in 1978 as a member of the Democratic Party in the 20th representative district, New Castle County.
