= James Chalmers McRuer =

Canadian lawyer, judge, commissioner and author

The Honourable James Chalmers McRuer
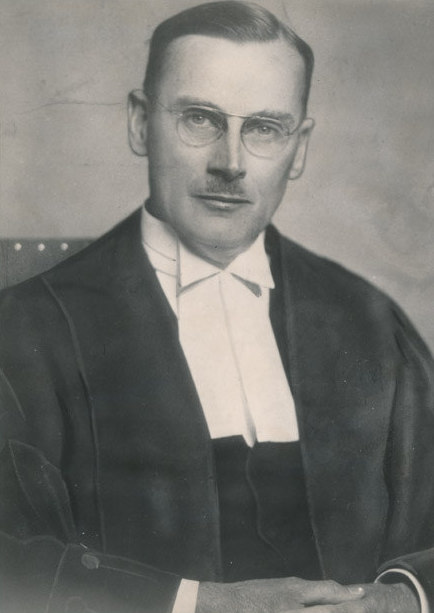

Justice of the Ontario Court of Appeal
- In office 1944–1945
- Nominated by: William Lyon Mackenzie King

Chief Justice of the High Court of Justice of Ontario
- In office 1945–1964
- Nominated by: William Lyon Mackenzie King

Chairman of the Ontario Law Reform Commission
- In office 1964–1966

18th President of the Canadian Bar Association
- In office 1946–1947
- Preceded by: Esten Kenneth Williams
- Succeeded by: John Thomas Hackett

12th President of the Ontario Bar Association
- In office 1943–1944
- Preceded by: Kenneth F. Mackenzie
- Succeeded by: Fred Holmes Barlow

Personal details
- Born: August 23, 1890 Oxford County, Ontario
- Died: October 6, 1985 (aged 95)
- Party: Liberal Party of Canada
- Occupation: Lawyer, judge, commissioner and author

Military service
- Branch/service: Royal Canadian Artillery
- Rank: Lieutenant

James Chalmers McRuer OC (August 23, 1890 – October 6, 1985) was a Canadian lawyer, judge, commissioner and author in Ontario.

== Biography ==
Born in Ayr, Oxford County, Ontario, he received his law education from the Osgoode Hall Law School and was called to the Bar of Ontario in 1913. During World War I, he served in the Canadian Field Artillery as a lieutenant. After the war, from 1921 to 1925 he was an Assistant Crown Attorney for Toronto and County of York. From 1930 to 1935, he was a lecturer at Osgoode Hall Law School. He ran unsuccessfully as the Liberal candidate in High Park in the 1935 federal election losing to Alexander James Anderson.

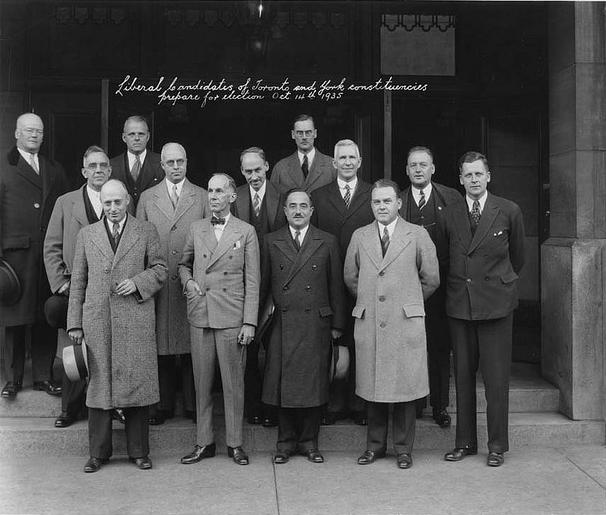
Federal Liberal Party candidates in Toronto and York County in 1935, including McRuer (back row, centre of photo)

McRuer was active in the Canadian Bar Association, and served first as President of the Ontario Bar Association from 1943 to 1944, and then as national President of the Canadian Bar Association from 1946 to 1947.

In 1944, he was appointed to the Court of Appeal for Ontario and in 1945 was appointed Chief Justice of the High Court of Justice for the Province of Ontario. He resigned in 1964. As Chief Justice he served on various Royal Commissions and was Chairman of the Ontario Law Reform Commission from 1964 to 1966 and Vice-Chairman until 1977. He also served as President of the Canadian Bar Association while on the bench. Beginning in 1964, McRuer headed the Royal Commission Inquiry into Civil Rights (known as the McRuer commission).

McRuer was the judge in the trial of Arthur Lucas, who became one of the last two men to be executed in Canada.

He wrote the books The Evolution of the Judicial Process (1957) and The Trial of Jesus (1978).

In 1968, he was made an Officer of the Order of Canada "for his services in the profession of law and as a member of many Royal Commissions".

== Works ==
- "Archives of Ontario McRuer, J. C. (James Chalmers)". Archived from the original on May 8, 2006.
- Patrick Boyer (1994). Passion for Justice:The Legacy of James Chalmers McRuer. University of Toronto Press. ISBN 0-8020-0656-6.
