= Richard Hatt =

Canadian politician

Richard Hatt (September 10, 1769 – September 26, 1819) was a businessman, judge and political figure in Upper Canada.

He was born in London, England, in 1769 and came to Upper Canada in 1792. He originally started business as a merchant at Niagara but later moved to Ancaster, where he opened a store and built a grist mill. In 1800, he set up a number of enterprises known as the Dundas Mills north of Cootes Paradise; a settlement grew up around these industries. In the same year, he was named justice of the peace. During the War of 1812, he served as a major in the local militia. After the war, he was appointed judge in the court for the Gore District. He also owned the Upper Canada Phoenix, a newspaper. In 1817, he was elected to the 7th Parliament of Upper Canada in a by-election. He died in Dundas in 1819, while still in office.
