= John Ferguson (Upper Canada politician) =

Upper Canada farmer, merchant, judge and politician

Member of the Legislative Assembly of Upper Canada for Frontenac
- In office 1800–1804

Personal details
- Born: 1756
- Died: 1830 (aged 73–74)
- Spouse: Helena Magdalene Johnson
- Occupation: Farmer, merchant, judge

Military service
- Rank: Colonel (militia)

John Ferguson (1756–1830) was a farmer, merchant, judge and political figure in Upper Canada. He represented Frontenac in the Legislative Assembly of Upper Canada from 1800 to 1804.

Ferguson married Helena Magdalene Johnson, the daughter of Sir William Johnson. Ferguson lived in Sidney Township and then Kingston. He served as barracks master at Oswegatche and Fort Ontario and then as commissary at Kingston. Ferguson was a colonel in the militia and then captain in the Indian Department. He also served as a justice of the peace. He was named a judge in the Midland District in 1798.
