= HMS Speedy (1798) =

Royal Navy gunboat sunk in Lake Ontario

Coordinates: 43.814°N 76.789°W

History

Great Britain
- Name: HMS Speedy
- Builder: Kingston Royal Naval Dockyard, Kingston
- Commissioned: 1798
- Fate: Sank on 8 October 1804
- Notes: Provincial Marine vessel

General characteristics
- Length: Roughly 80 feet (24 m)
- Sail plan: 2 masts
- Complement: 6

The schooner or gunboat HMS Speedy sank in a snowstorm in Lake Ontario south of the future site of Brighton, Ontario, and west of Prince Edward County, on 8 October 1804, with the loss of all hands.

The ship was built for the Provincial Marine in 1798 at the Point Frederick Navy Depot and was used to transport government officials and supplies.

== Description ==
HMS Speedy was one of five warships rushed into service, quickly built from green timber at Cataraqui (present-day Kingston) in 1798, to help defend British Upper Canada from the perceived threat from the newly formed United States. That threat was later realised as the War of 1812, but Speedy would not survive to see service in that conflict. Speedy carried four-pound guns and had a 55-foot (17 m), two-masted hull plus an over 20-foot (6 m) bowsprit, bringing her close to 80 ft (24 m) in total length. In spite of her name, Speedy was considered slow for her era. Because she was constructed from improperly seasoned green timber, she almost immediately began to suffer problems with leaks and dry rot after her commissioning.

== Final voyage of the Speedy ==
The schooner was set to sail from the Queen's Quay, York, present-day Toronto, the young capital of Upper Canada, to the district town of Newcastle District (not the present-day town of Newcastle) on Presqu'ile Point (now Presqu'ile Provincial Park) for a prominent murder trial ostensibly to 'legitimize' a newly built district courthouse.

Speedy was carrying the first provincial law-enforcement officer to lose his life in the execution of office. High Constable Fisk was transporting a prisoner to court in Newcastle. The prisoner was Ogetonicut, a member of the Ojibway tribe, who was accused of murdering trading post operator John Sharpe near Lake Scugog. Ogetonicut was suspected of exacting revenge for the killing of his brother, Whistling Duck. Although Ogetonicut was arrested near York, the crime had allegedly been committed in Newcastle District, and under British law of the time, one had to be tried in the jurisdiction in which the crime was purported to have been committed. Also on board were Justice Thomas Cochrane, the judge for Ogetonicut's trial, and the accused's lawyer.

The ship was also carrying six handwritten copies of the constitution of Upper Canada, supplies, and a Royal surveyor, John Stegman, a former Hessian soldier, to help in the planning, construction, and expansion of the fledgling district town, which consisted of nothing more than the three-story courthouse/jail, a handful of residences and a survey plan. Sir Robert Isaac Dey Grey (of Bruce-Grey County fame), first Solicitor-General of Upper Canada was also on board.

The schooner left York on 7 October 1804 at the insistence of autocratic Lieutenant-Governor Peter Hunter, despite the reluctance of the ship's captain, Lieutenant Thomas Paxton. Paxton, an experienced British naval officer, was concerned about an incoming storm and the condition of the ship.

Although only six years old, Speedy suffered from extensive weakening of the hull from dry rot due to the timber used in her rushed construction. Two of Speedy's crew were required to constantly operate manual bilge pumps to keep her afloat for the journey. Under threat of court-martial, Paxton departed. Almost immediately upon her launch, she ran aground in the harbour due to the heavy load, resulting in a six-hour delay.

After freeing herself, she sailed due east. Speedy stopped briefly at Port Oshawa to pick up the Farewell brothers who were business partners of the murder victim and key witnesses for the prosecution, and a handful of Natives who were also to provide testimony. The Farewell brothers refused to board the ship, expressing concern that it was already overloaded, crowded, and unsafe. They elected to accompany Speedy in a canoe.

Speedy and the canoe were separated as the storm deteriorated into blizzard conditions during the afternoon and evening of 8 October. The wind had turned and was blowing out of the northeast. By the morning of 9 October, the brothers managed to reach Newcastle's harbour. Not so for Speedy. The schooner was sighted passing Presqu'ile Point at dusk on 8 October. The crew fired one of her cannons to signal her situation and position. In response; shoreline bonfires were lit, ostensibly to guide her to safety.

The schooner vanished on approach to the mouth of the bay (Presqu'ile Bay). All that was found of the ship, her passengers, cargo, and six-man crew were a chicken coop and compass box. These washed up on the beach opposite the bay.

== Investigation ==
Unable to navigate using celestial markers or spot the signal fires due to the storm-induced white outs, the captain was completely reliant on the ship's compass to navigate. Evidence suggests that Speedy was unaware of being in the area now known as the Sophiasburgh Triangle, where magnetic anomalies purportedly exist and prevent proper compass operation. Being unable to sail directly into the northeasterly wind, she had trouble steering. It is possible that the Speedy struck the mysterious Devil's Horseblock (or Hitching Post), a stone pinnacle that extended up to within 20 cm of the surface.

The area was dragged with hooks in a government-sponsored effort to establish what had actually transpired. It was established that the mysterious monolithic Horseblock shoal had also vanished. Some suggested the 200-ton Speedy was capable of up-ending or toppling over this unusual formation.

Speedy became the latest of nearly 100 ships The Sophiasburgh Triangle had claimed since the beginning of the 18th century, adding to fears that the area was too dangerous for a major port.

== Legacy ==
In part due to this disaster, Presqu'ile was deemed an inappropriate and "inconvenient" location for a district town. The incident was called "a disaster felt by the Bench, the Bar Society, the Legislature and the Country." The new settlement at Newcastle was abandoned and the district centre was moved to Amherst (now known as Cobourg) in 1805. A new town bearing the name of Newcastle was established some 50 years later, in a different location.

Each summer the story of Speedy is told through a history play as part of Presqu'ile Provincial Park's Natural Heritage Education program. The story is also told by an interactive video display at the point in the Lighthouse Interpretive Centre. The point is also home to a commemorative plaque, erected by the Ontario Historical Society. A play about the sinking was put on at Harbourfront Centre in Toronto in 2017.

== Search for wreck ==
Ed Burtt, a wreck hunter searched for the wreck and claimed to have found it in 1990, and hoped to salvage it under maritime laws. Burtt recovered some items from the wreck, potentially identifying it. He kept the location secret, planning to house relics in an exhibit space. Burtt died in 2017 without revealing the location of the wreck. Other divers plan to continue the search.

== Casualties ==
Records are not clear, listing somewhere between 20 and 39 passengers aboard Speedy, along with her crew of 6. It may never be known exactly how many died in the sinking. Those lost included:

- Lieutenant Thomas Paxton, Captain of HMS Speedy
- John Cameron, Speedy crew member
- Francis Labard, Speedy crew member
- Ogetonicut, prisoner charged with murder
- Angus Macdonell, defence lawyer and member of the Upper Canada House of Assembly
- George Cowan, Coldwater-based fur trader and interpreter employed by the government's Indian Department
- Justice Thomas Cochran, the trial judge, Judge of the Court of King's Bench of Upper Canada
- Robert Isaac Dey Grey, prosecutor and the first Solicitor-General of Upper Canada
- Simon Baker, slave of Dey Grey
- John Anderson, law student
- John Stegman, land surveyor of the Surveyor-General's Office, possible trial witness
- James Ruggles, Justice of the Peace, possible trial witness
- Two or three unnamed First Nations men and women, trial witnesses
- John Fisk, High Constable of York, first police officer died in the line of duty in the Ontario and Canada
- Jacob Herchmer, prominent Loyalist merchant and fur trader, Lieutenant in York Militia
- Two young children, sent on the Speedy by overland-travelling parents who could not afford passage for themselves, and thought Speedy would be safer
