= Solomon Hill (politician) =

Upper Canada politician and farmer

Solomon Hill (August 30, 1756 – August 30, 1807) was a farmer and political figure in Upper Canada. He represented West York, 1st Lincoln & Haldimand in the Legislative Assembly of Upper Canada from 1804 to 1807.

He was born in Red Mills, Dutchess County, New York, the son of William Hill and Bethia Smith, and received a land grant in Grimsby Township in Upper Canada. Hill served in the Loyal American Regiment during the American Revolution. He married Bethiah Griffin. Hill died in office in Smithville, Grimsby Township at the age of 51.
