= Angus Macdonell of Collachie =

Canadian politician

Angus Macdonnell of Collachie

3rd Treasurer of the Law Society of Upper Canada
- In office 1801–1804
- Preceded by: Robert Isaac Dey Gray
- Succeeded by: Thomas Scott

Angus Macdonell of Collachie (died October 8, 1804) was a lawyer and political figure in Upper Canada.

He was born in Inverness-shire, Scotland, the son of Allan McDonell and brother of Alexander Macdonell of Collachie, and came to the estate of William Johnson in the Mohawk Valley of New York in 1773 as part of a large emigration by members of the MacDonell clan. He left that area at the beginning of the American Revolution and was educated in Montreal and Quebec City.

He became first clerk of the Legislative Assembly of Upper Canada in 1792 and an attorney in 1794. When Henry Allcock's election was contested, he ran in an 1801 by-election in Durham, Simcoe & 1st York and won, defeating John Small, clerk of the Executive Council. He introduced the Assessment Act of 1803 which was intended to provide more equal rates.

He was also a founding member of the Law Society of Upper Canada and its third treasurer. In October 1804, he was en route to a trial aboard HMS Speedy where he would defend a native person charged with murder. The ship sank in a storm on Lake Ontario near Brighton with all hands lost.
