= Robert Thorpe (judge) =

Canadian politician

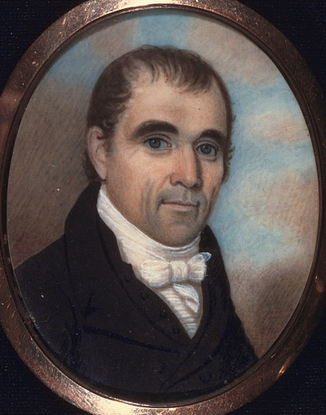
- Portrait of Robert Thorpe

Chief Justice of Sierra Leone
- In office 1808–1815
- Succeeded by: Dr. Robert Hogan

Member of the Upper Canada Legislative Assembly
- In office 1806–1807
- Preceded by: William Weekes

Chief Justice of Prince Edward Island
- In office 1801–1804
- Preceded by: Peter Stewart
- Succeeded by: Caesar Colclough

Robert Thorpe (1773 – May 11, 1836) was a judge and political figure in Upper Canada and was later chief justice of Sierra Leone.

== Early life ==
Thorpe was born in Dublin, Ireland in 1773. He was the second son of Robert T. Thorpe and Bonna Debrisay. He graduated with a bachelor's degree in 1788 and a degree in law in 1789 from Trinity College Dublin. He was admitted to the bar in 1790. At some point before 1815 he was given a Legum Doctor.

== In Canada ==
In 1801, he was appointed as Chief Justice of Prince Edward Island, arriving in the colony in November 1802. He encouraged the attorney general Peter Magowan to prosecute minor crimes that were annoying to the population. Since he was not paid on time, he sailed to England in 1804 with a plan to unite Prince Edward Island, Cape Breton and Newfoundland. He was captured by a French privateer and taken to Spain. Thorpe later escaped and was appointed a puisne judge of the Court of King's Bench in Upper Canada on 5 July 1805. In 1806 William Weekes was killed in a duel and Thorpe was elected as his replacement to the 4th Parliament of Upper Canada. He advocated that the executive council should be responsible to the elected representatives. He advocated for ideas that would be later called responsible government and home rule. Lieutenant Governor Francis Gore suspended Thorpe from the legislature in July 1807 for advocating against the powers of the Lieutenant Governor. He left Upper Canada in 1807 when he believed he would be removed from his role as a judge due to his reform ideas.

== Sierra Leone ==
In 1808, Thorpe was appointed the first chief justice in Sierra Leone (chief justice and judge of the Vice-Admiralty Court). He arrived in Sierra Leone in 1811. He presided over the cases of Samuel Samo (7-10 April 1812), Joseph Peters (11 June 1812) and William Tufft (12 June 1812). Thorpe left Sierra Leone in 1813 after he was given a health leave by the governor of Sierra Leone. He was ordered to pay £630 for a surrogate who presided as a judge for him. In 1815 Thorpe brought charges against Charles William Maxwell and supposedly tried to blackmail the colonial secretary Lord Bathurst. Thorpe was dismissed from his judgeship for not bringing the charges to Bathurst sooner.

== Personal life ==
Thorpe was married and had seven children.

== Later life ==
In 1815 he published A Letter to William Wilberforce, Esq. M. P., Vice-President of the African Institution which was critical of the Sierra Leone Company and the African Institution which succeeded it.

"After sixteen years experiment, trade having failed; cultivation being retarded, civilization unattempted; religion and morality debased, and the slave trade nourished; every plan defeated, every artifice exposed; the company desirous of relieving themselves from the enormous expense prevailed on government to accept a surrender of the colony, and formed (to uphold their old influence) a society called the African Institution: having taken leave of the expense, they demanded to be paid for their buildings, and did accordingly receive a large sum from the treasury, although they had before obtained (by pleading poverty) one hundred thousand pounds from the government for the improvement of the colony: their books and agents were removed; while many of the settlers who had toiled for them for years were left unpaid."

He died in London on May 11, 1836.

== Published works ==
- A Reply "Point by Point" to the Special Report of the Directors of the African Institution ... (1815) London: F. C. and J. Rivington. Retrieved 2 August 2016.
- A commentary on the treatises entered into between his Britannic majesty, and his most faithful majesty ... his catholic majesty ... and ... the king of the Netherlands ... for the purpose of preventing their subjects from engaging in any illicit traffic in slaves (1819) London: Longman, Hurst, Rees, Orme and Browne
