= Law Society of Ontario =

Canadian provincial law society

- Barreau de l'Ontario
- Abbreviation: LSO
- Founded: 1797; 229 years ago
- Type: Law society
- Headquarters: Osgoode Hall, 130 Queen Street West, Toronto, Ontario, Canada
- Region served: Ontario
- Official language: English; French
- Treasurer: Shalini Konanur
- CEO: Tom Teahen
- Affiliations: Federation of Law Societies of Canada
- Website: lso.ca
- Formerly called: The Law Society of Upper Canada (1797–2018)

The Law Society of Ontario (LSO; French: Barreau de l'Ontario) is the law society responsible for the self-regulation of lawyers and paralegals in the Canadian province of Ontario. Founded in 1797 as the Law Society of Upper Canada (LSUC; French: Barreau du Haut-Canada), its name was changed by statute in 2018.

== History ==
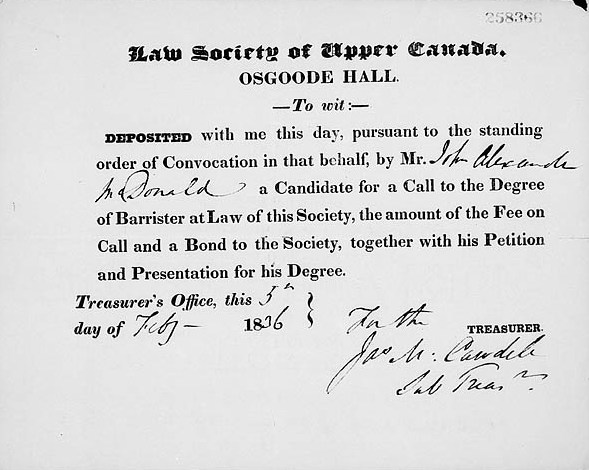
Receipt dated February 5, 1836, for application to the Law Society of Upper Canada issued to John A. Macdonald, the future first prime minister of Canada

The Law Society of Upper Canada was established in 1797 to regulate the legal profession in the British colony of Upper Canada and is the oldest self-governing body in North America. The Society governed the legal profession in the coterminous Canada West from 1841 to 1867, and in Ontario since Confederation in 1867.

The Law Society was authorized, although not created, by the Act for the better regulating of the practice of the law, a 1797 statute. Section 1 of the act simply authorized those at the time "admitted in the law and practising at the bar" in the province to form themselves into a "society". The 1797 statute allowed the Law Society to impose requirements for admission to the bar of Upper Canada and to test applicants against these standards.

That statute made no express provisions for any other people to become members of the Law Society: but the power to admit others than the existing practitioners was considered to be implied by section 5. Section 5 provided that "no person other than the present practitioners ... shall be permitted to practise at the bar of any of His Majesty's courts in this province, unless such person shall have been previously entered of and admitted into the said society as a student of the laws ... and shall have been duly called and admitted to the practice of the law as a barrister, according to the constitutions and establishment thereof". Incorporation of the Society occurred in 1822.

On July 17, 1797, at Wilson's Hotel in Newark, Ontario (now Niagara-on-the-Lake), a group of lawyers, including John White, Robert Isaac Dey Gray, and Bartholomew Crannell Beardsley, inaugurated the Law Society pursuant to the 1797 act.

The Law Society's first home was at Wilson's Hotel, then from 1799 to 1832 at various temporary locations at York (Toronto) until Osgoode Hall was built in 1832. The Law Society continued to retain its original name, even though Upper Canada ceased to exist as a political entity in 1841. Throughout the early 1800s, the Law Society imposed increasingly onerous requirements on potential Upper Canadian lawyers, at one point requiring students-at-law to live at Osgoode Hall while they completed their legal studies. Historian Paul Romney argues such licensing requirements enhanced the legal profession's "prestige" in the young colony, as compared to its position in other North American colonies or the United States.

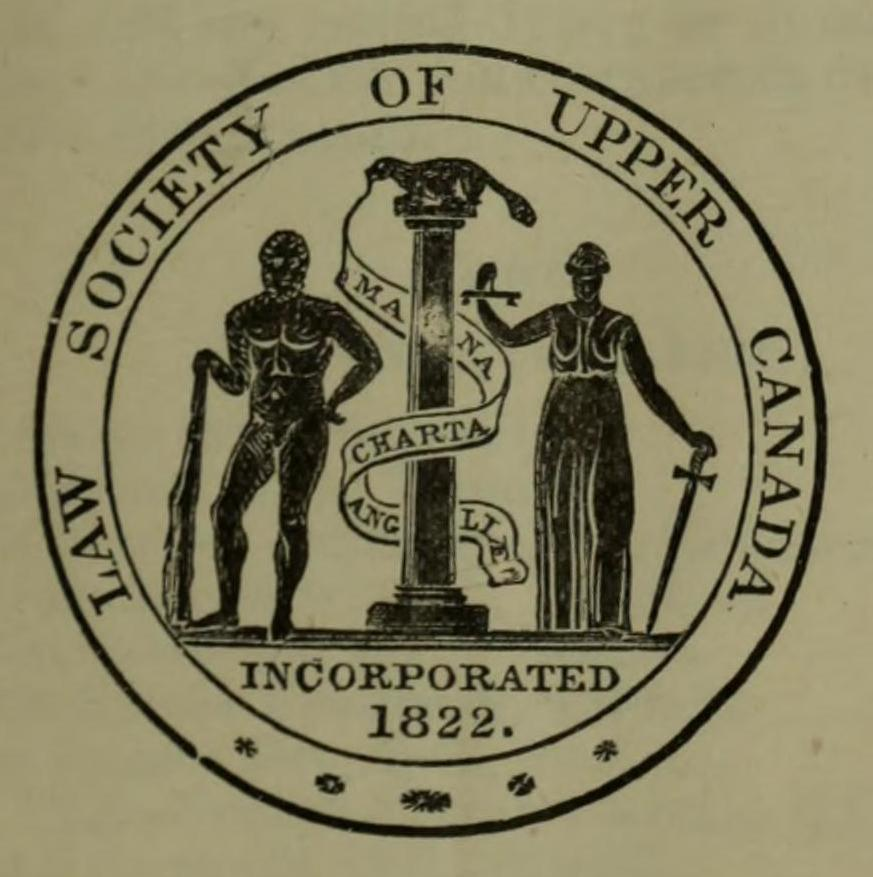
Seal of the Society, 1889

The Law Society was reformed by statute in 1970, under the Law Society Act, 1970. That statute defined the Society as "a corporation without share capital composed of the Treasurer, the benchers, and other members from time to time". Many of the reforms in the 1971 act were inspired by the McRuer report, officially the Report of the Royal Commission Inquiry into Civil Rights (1968), a wide-ranging set of law reform recommendations for Ontario developed under the leadership of James Chalmers McRuer.

On October 27, 1994, the Law Society adopted a "role statement" holding that it "exists to govern the legal profession in the public interest" and has the "purpose of advancing the cause of justice".

The Law Society faced calls to change the name Upper Canada. Benchers voted to drop the name and replace it with a new one. On November 2, 2017, the Society's governing body (Convocation) chose "Law Society of Ontario" as the new name. The name change was made official on May 8, 2018, following amendments to the Law Society Act as part of the 2018 provincial budget implementation bill.

In 2017, the Law Society enacted a requirement that licensees acknowledge an "obligation to promote equality, diversity and inclusion", referred to as a "statement of principles". The requirement was phased in over several months in late 2017. Following a public campaign called "StopSOP", under which a number of benchers were elected who pledged to repeal the requirement, the requirement was repealed in September 2019. Some StopSOP advocates argued that the measure was an example of compelled speech, while opponents argued that acknowledging equal rights was essential.

In the 2023 bencher election, the StopSOP slate, renamed to FullStop, was defeated by the Good Governance Coalition, which ran on a civility platform.

In March 2025, the Law Society terminated the employment of CEO Diana Miles after receiving a report it commissioned from former associate chief justice of Ontario Dennis O'Connor into her June 2024 salary increase. Her base salary of $595,000 with 20% annual bonuses had been increased to a flat salary of $936,800 without approval by benchers at Convocation by former treasurer Jacqueline Horvat. In July 2024, Horvat left her position after being appointed to the Ontario Superior Court of Justice and new treasurer Peter Wardle notified Convocation in November of the amended contract against Miles's wishes, which led to O'Connor being hired to investigate. While the report did not have a mandate to assign blame, O'Connor concluded Miles ought to have known that the raise required Convocation approval, that Horvat did not have unilateral authority to amend the contract, and that Horvat was aware of prior contentious Convocation disputes over Miles's salary and bonuses. The reason for Miles's departure was not immediately revealed but after leaks to outlets such as The Globe and Mail and public pressure from lawyers, including some benchers, O'Connor's report was publicly released.

== Oversight ==
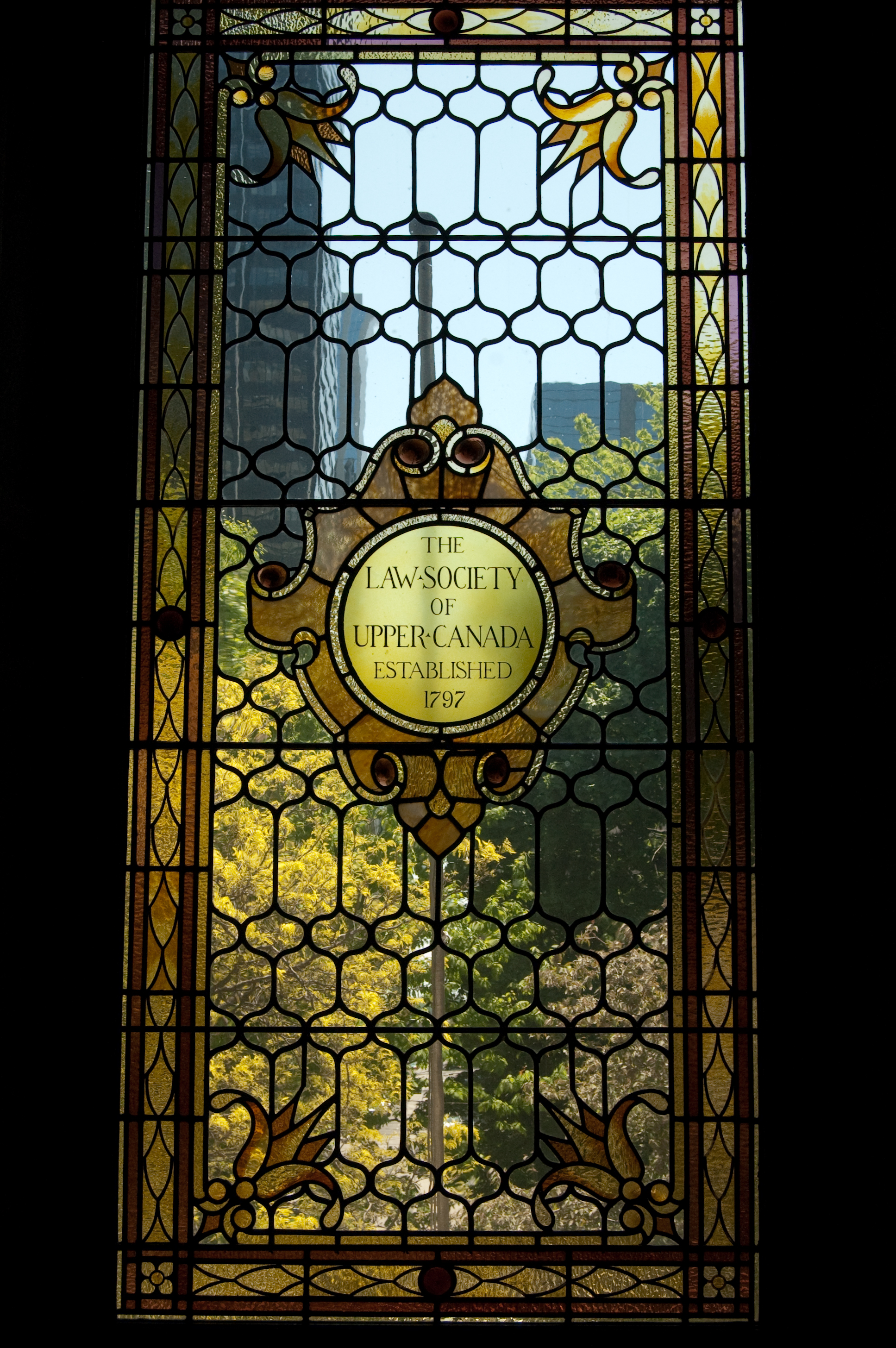
Osgoode Hall stained glass window

The Law Society regulates the more than 50,000 lawyers in Ontario. It is responsible for ensuring that lawyers are both ethical and competent. The Society has the power to set standards for admission into the profession. It is empowered to discipline lawyers who violate those standards. Available sanctions range from admonitions to disbarment. It is based in Toronto, at Osgoode Hall.

Beginning in 1970, pursuant to the Law Society Act, 1970, the Law Society has required that potential licensees demonstrate "good character". Potential licensees demonstrate "good character" by answering questions intended to show ethical strength, including honesty, integrity, and candour. The Law Society was the first professional body in Ontario to officially include public representation in its governing body.

=== Paralegals ===
Effective May 1, 2007, as a result of amendments to Ontario's Law Society Act, the Law Society regulates more than 8,000 paralegal licensees in Ontario. Paralegals are licensed to provide limited legal services, such as providing representation before provincial tribunals.

=== Tribunal decisions ===
The Law Society Tribunal is an independent adjudicative tribunal within the Law Society of Ontario that processes, hears and decides regulatory cases about Ontario lawyers and paralegals. It began operations on March 12, 2014.

Effective November 16, 2020, Malcolm M. Mercer became the chair of the Law Society Tribunal.

== Treasurer ==
The Law Society is headed by a treasurer. The latter is elected by the benchers, who comprise "Convocation" – in effect, the Society's board of directors, as the Society is an Ontario Corporation without share capital. All lawyer-benchers are elected by the Society's members, and eight lay benchers are appointed by the provincial government.

The current Treasurer is Shalini Konanur, who was elected on June 17, 2026. Tom Teahen has served as the chief executive officer (CEO) since February 2026. The previous CEO of the Law Society was Diana Miles, until her March 2025 termination.

== Arms ==
Coat of arms of Law Society of Ontario

Notes
The coat of arms was confirmed by the Canadian Heraldic Authority on May 15, 2019.
Crest
Upon a rocky mount proper a mantle Ermine lined Murrey thereon a beaver couchant proper holding in its mouth a sprig of two maple leaves Or.
Escutcheon
Sable on a chevron between two stags trippant in chief and a rose in base Argent barbed and seeded, an open book proper bound Azure edged and clasped Or between two maple leaves Gules.
Supporters
Dexter the figure of Hercules holding in the dexter hand a club, sinister the figure of Justice holding in the sinister hand a sword erect proper pommel and hilt and with a balance Or suspended from the blade, both standing on a grassy mount Vert.

== See also ==
- CCH Canadian Ltd v Law Society of Upper Canada
- Federation of Law Societies of Canada

== Sources ==
- Arthurs, H. W. (March 1971). "Authority, Accountability, and Democracy in the Government of the Ontario Legal Profession". Canadian Bar Review. 49 (1). 1971 CanLIIDocs 30.
- Moore, Christopher (1997). The Law Society of Upper Canada and Ontario's Lawyers, 1797–1997. University of Toronto Press. ISBN 978-1-4426-2337-8. OCLC 904376526.
- P'ng, Justin (2019). "The Gatekeeper's Jurisdiction: The Law Society of Ontario and the Promotion of Diversity in the Legal Profession". University of Toronto Faculty of Law Review. 77: 82–107.
- Riddell, William Renwick (1916). The Legal Profession in Upper Canada in Its Early Periods. Toronto: Law Society of Upper Canada. ISBN 978-0-665-77544-4. OCLC 1129351627.
- Romney, Paul (1995). "Upper Canada (Ontario): The Administration of Justice, 1784–1850". Manitoba Law Journal. 23: 183–213. 1995 CanLIIDocs 136.
- Sealy-Harrington, Joshua (2020). "Twelve Angry (White) Men: The Constitutionality of the Statement of Principles". Ottawa Law Review. 51 (1). 2020 CanLIIDocs 583.
