= List of treasurers of the Law Society of Upper Canada =

The following individuals have held the position of treasurer of the Law Society of Upper Canada (1797–2018) or the Law Society of Ontario (2018–present).

== List of treasurers ==
=== Law Society of Upper Canada (1797–2018) ===
- John White 1797–1798
- Robert Isaac Dey Gray 1798–1801
- Angus Macdonell 1801–1805
- Thomas Scott 1805–1806
- G. D'Arcy Boulton 1806–1811
- William Warren Baldwin 1811–1815
- G. D'Arcy Boulton 1815–1818
- Sir John Robinson, 1st Baronet, of Toronto 1818–1819
- Henry John Boulton 1819–1820
- William Warren Baldwin 1820–1821
- Sir John Robinson, 1st Baronet, of Toronto 1821–1822
- Henry John Boulton 1822–1824
- William Warren Baldwin 1824–1828
- Sir John Robinson, 1st Baronet, of Toronto 1828–1829
- George Ridout 1829–1832
- William Warren Baldwin 1832–1836
- Robert Baldwin Sullivan 1836
- Robert Sympson Jameson 1836–1841
- Levius Peters Sherwood 1841–1843
- William Henry Draper 1843–1845
- Robert Sympson Jameson 1845–1846
- Henry John Boulton 1846–1847
- Robert Baldwin 1847–1848
- James Edward Small 1848–1849
- Robert Easton Burns 1849–1850
- John Godfrey Spragge 1850
- Robert Baldwin 1850–1859
- James Buchanan MacAulay 1859
- John Hillyard Cameron 1859–1876
- Stephen Richards 1876–1879
- Edward Blake 1879–1893
- Aemilius Irving 1893–1913
- George Ferguson Shepley 1913–1916
- John Hoskin 1916–1921
- Featherston Osler 1921–1924
- Frederick Weir Harcourt 1924–1927
- Wallace Nesbitt 1927–1930
- William Norman Tilley 1930–1935
- Newton Rowell 1935–1936
- Michael Herman Ludwig 1936–1937
- Robert Spelman Robertson 1937–1939
- D'Alton Lally McCarthy 1939–1944
- John Shirley Denison 1944–1947
- Gershom William Mason 1947–1950
- Cyril Frederick Harshaw Carson 1950–1958
- John Josiah Robinette 1958–1962
- Joseph Sedgwick 1962–1963
- John Douglas Arnup 1963–1966
- Brendan O'Brien 1966–1968
- William Goldwin Carrington Howland 1968–1970
- Goldwin Arthur Martin 1970–1971
- Sydney Lewis Robins 1971–1974
- Stuart Douglas Thom 1974–1976
- Wesley Gibson Gray 1976–1978
- George Duncan Finlayson 1978–1980
- John Douglas Bowlby 1980–1983
- Brendan O'Brien 1983
- Laura Legge 1983–1985
- Pierre Genest 1985–1986
- Arthur Richard Andrew Scace 1986–1987
- William Daniel Chilcott 1987–1988
- Laura Legge 1988
- Lee Kenneth Ferrier 1988–1990
- James MacDonald Spence 1990–1992
- Allan Michael Rock 1992–1993
- Paul Stephen Andrew Lamek 1993–1995
- Eleanor Susan Elliott 1995–1997
- Harvey Thomas Strosberg 1997–1999
- Robert Patrick Armstrong 1999–2001
- Vern Krishna 2001–2003
- Frank Neal Stephen Marrocco 2003–2005
- George Douglas Hunter 2005–2006
- Clayton Ruby (interim treasurer) 2006
- Gavin MacKenzie 2006–2008
- Derry Millar 2008–2010
- Laurie Pawlitza 2010–2012
- Thomas G. Conway 2012–2014
- Janet E. Minor 2014–2016
- Paul Schabas 2016–2018

=== Law Society of Ontario (2018–present) ===
- Malcolm M. Mercer 2018–2020
- Teresa Donnelly 2020–2022
- Jacqueline Horvat 2022–2024
- Peter C. Wardle 2024–2026
- Shalini Konanur 2026–present
