= Carding (police policy) =

Police intelligence gathering method

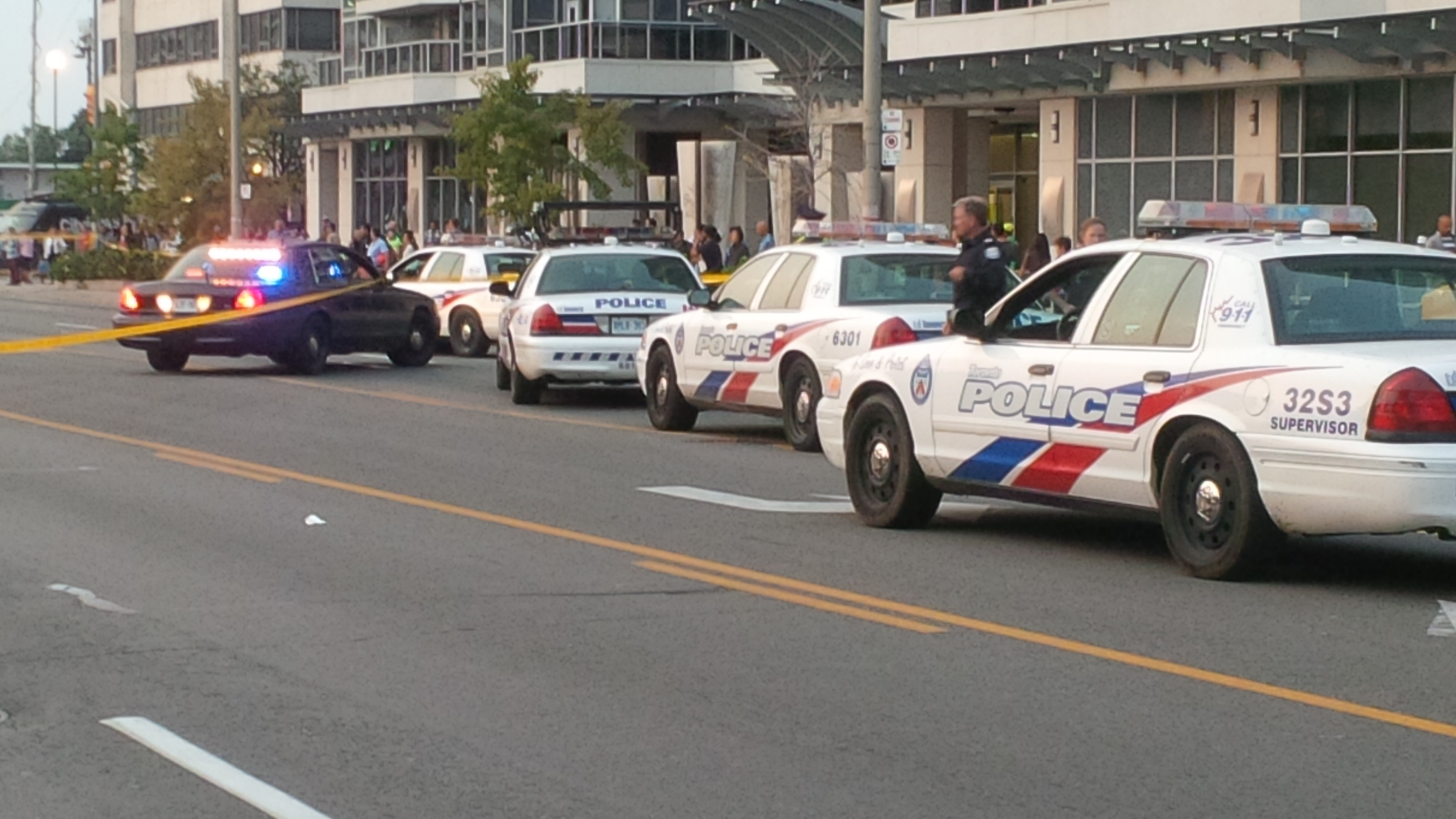
Toronto Police Service cruisers and officers in 2014.

In Canada, carding, officially known in Ontario as the Community Contacts Policy, is an intelligence gathering policy involving the stopping, questioning, and documenting of individuals when no particular offence is being investigated. The interactions take place in public, private or any place police have contact with the public. The information collected is kept on record in the Field Information Report (FIR) database. FIRs include details including the individuals' gender, race, the reason for the interaction, location, and the names of any associates, to build a database for unspecified future use. Officially, individuals are not legally detained, but this distinction is not clear. Carding programs have been shown to consume a considerable amount of police resources, with little to no verifiable results on the level of crime. Carding is also known to contribute to a disproportionate amount of black and Indigenous people being recorded in law enforcement databases. Consequences for Indigenous and racialized populations include mental and physical health problems, loss of trust with the police, disparities within the criminal justice system, and social disadvantage, including potential loss of educational and employment opportunities.

In summer of 2014, the Toronto Police Service discontinued the use of physical hard copy cards; officers were instead directed to enter the information captured during community engagements into their memobook as Community Safety Notes, which may be retained for a maximum of seven years. Ontario's 2014 Counter Terrorism Plan directs police to ensure carding intelligence "is shared regularly with key partners", including Criminal Intelligence Service Canada, the Ontario Provincial Police, the Canadian Security Intelligence Service and the Royal Canadian Mounted Police.

== Meaning ==
Regina Police Chief Evan Bray stated that the distinction between carding and police-civilian interactions depends upon whether or not the information collected is recorded. In 2017, the Vancouver Police Department definition of a "street check" is when an officer stops a person to conduct an interview or investigation in regard to suspicious activity or a suspected crime. In 2018, the Vancouver Police Department clarified that an incident is only considered a "street check" when an officer successfully records an individual's personal information.

Kevin Brookwell, a spokesman for the Calgary Police Service, claimed that the term "carding" originated in Eastern Canada, though Lethbridge Police Chief Rob Davis asserted that the term "carding" originated in the United States, and that a street check is not stop and frisk. Waterloo Police Chief Bryan Larkin claims officers card individuals to determine how people connect to each other. Halifax Regional Police says officers also conduct passive street checks, where records are based on observations rather than interactions.

The Victoria Police Department defines street checks as "when a police officer proactively conducts a field interview or investigation with a member of the public related to suspicious activity or a suspected crime".

== Aliases ==
Street Check Reports
The Peel Regional Police refers to the practice as a "street check" and enter information gathered from "street check reports" into a database that Peel police maintains. The Edmonton Police Service also uses the term street check report.
Collection of Information In Certain Circumstances (CIICC)
Espanola Police call this practice "collection of information in certain circumstances" (CIICC).
Check-Up Slips
Prior to November 2016, the Calgary Police Service had a practice of collecting Check-up Slips.
Street Intelligence Reports
The Lethbridge Police Service has a practice of gathering Street Intelligence Reports.
Contact Interviews
The Saskatchewan Police Commission avoids the term carding because it prefers to use a more neutral term In July 2018, the Saskatoon Board of Police Commissioners, defined a Contact Interview as a "contact with the public initiated by a member of a police service with the intention of gathering information that is not related to a specific known incident or offence". Contact Interview information may be kept for up to five years.
Info Posts
In October 2016, at a carding seminar held by the Alberta Civil Liberties Research Centre at the University of Calgary, Calgary Police Chief Roger Chaffin announced that the term check-up slips, will be decommissioned and replaced with the term info posts.
Police Stop
On 15 January 2020, the Attorney General of British Columbia introduced the term "Police Stop" into section 6.2 of the Provincial Policing Standards. The standard specifies that such an action may include a demand for identifying information.

== Scope ==
Ontario regulations constraining carding came to effect at the beginning of 2017, changing the scope of carding in Ontario cities.

=== Prior to 2017 ===
- The PACER report indicates that from 2009 to 2011, there were 1,104,561 persons entered into the Toronto Police Service Field Information Report (FIR) database.
- In 2009 the Vancouver Police Department made 11,507 entries for street checks into the BC PRIME database. Between 2008 and 2017, officers conducted 97,281 street checks. 15% were Indigenous persons, (2% of local population), 4% were of Black persons (<1% of local population), with racial disparities increasing over time.
- The Ottawa Police Service entered 45,802 people into the Ottawa Records Management System (RMS) database from 23,402 street checks in the years 2011 to 2014 In 2012, Andrew Tysowski discovered that while innocent of any crime, the Ottawa Police Service had collected and stored some of his personal information for six years.
- The Hamilton Police Service published the annual number of street checks its ACTION team completed in its 2013 year-end report to the service's oversight board: 5,423 Street Checks in 2011, 4,803 in 2012 and 3,684 in 2013, records of these activities were recorded in the service's NICHE database.
- From 2005 to 2017, Halifax Regional Police officers have submitted 68,400 street checks of 36,700 individuals. Information is stored in Versadex, a Halifax Regional Police database also used to store other information.
- The Waterloo Regional Police have conducted 68,400 street checks between 2005 and 2015. Stops in the region increased from 1339 in 2005 to 8500 in 2013. Records capture date, time, and personal information such as address, height, weight, sex, and race.
- Since 2006, Niagara Regional Police officers have submitted 157,315 street checks.
- From 2009 to 2014, the Peel Regional Police conducted 159,303 street checks, recorded on PRP17 cards, and a freedom-of-information request by a Peel Region resident revealed that black people were three times more likely to be stopped than whites.
- Between 2011 and 2014, the Edmonton Police Service carded 105,306 individuals, an average 26,000-plus people per year. In Edmonton, carding information is stored indefinitely. The Police Service has acknowledged that "police do not inform people they have the right to walk away" and take the position that "some of the responsibility should be on individuals to know their rights".
- In 2014, the London Police Service performed 8,400 street checks and entered 14,000 people, vehicles and properties into their database, of those identified, 71% were white, 7.7% were black and 5.3% were of First Nation heritage.
- In 2010, the Calgary Police Service carded 47,000 people, while in 2015 around 27,000 people having been carded.
- In 2014, the Saskatoon Police Service stopped nearly 4,500 people, about 1.7 per cent of the city's population. In 2015, 735 street checks were conducted. In Saskatoon, street check records are kept for ten years.
- In 2014, the Windsor Police Service generated 953 street check reports, the service averages 1,265 street checks a year.
- In 2015, the Lethbridge Police Service filed 1,257 carding reports, and 1,007 in 2016. Though 80 per cent of the Lethbridge's population identify as caucasian, 60 per cent of the recorded carding incidents in Lethbridge involved non-caucasians.
- In 2012, the Edmonton Police Service filed 27,322 carding reports, 27,155 in 2015 and 22,969 in 2016 During 2016 in Edmonton, Indigenous women were 10 times more likely to be stopped by officers.

=== Since 2017 ===
- In 2017, the Hamilton Police Service filed 5 carding reports.
- In 2017, the Ottawa Police Service recorded 7 carding stops.
- In 2017, the Vancouver Police Department recorded 6,322 street checks While Indigenous people make up about 2 percent of Vancouver's population, 16 percent of those subjected to Vancouver street checks in 2017 were Indigenous.
- In 2017, the Edmonton Police Service filed 15,909 street check reports, a 30 percent reduction from 2016 which Police Chief Rod Knecht attributes in part to the carding controversy.
- In 2019, the University of Ottawa asserted that according to Policy 33, Members of Protection Services are authorized to request proof of identity from persons on campus.
- In 2020, Chief Mark Neufeld of the Calgary Police Service stated that even when there is no apparent evidence of a crime, stopping individuals and demanding personal information remains an important part of police work.

== Criticism ==
Opposition to carding is widespread, with testimony and a news organization investigation indicating that carding in Toronto primarily targets black and brown Canadians. The Law Union of Ontario submitted that carding implements a systematic violation of people's Charter rights, human rights, and privacy rights. The Office of the Ontario Ombudsman believes the practice of carding is illegal.

On November 18, 2013, the Canadian Civil Liberties Association denounced carding as "unlawful and unconstitutional" to the Toronto Police Services Board.

On January 13, 2014, the Ontario Human Rights Commission formally notified the Toronto Police Services Board that the practice of carding must be stopped.

On May 7, 2015, in Elmardy v. TPSB, Ontario Superior Court Justice Frederick Myers ruled "One who is not being investigated for criminality is allowed to walk down the street on a cold night with his or her hands in the pockets and to tell inquisitive police officers to get lost without being detained, searched, exposed to sub-zero temperatures, or assaulted."

On October 23, 2015, Ruth Goba, Interim Chief Commissioner of the Ontario Human Commission Rights Commission, stated that when Hamilton Police Chief De Caire requires police officers to be "stopping, talking and investigating young black males", the Hamilton Police Service is implementing a textbook description of racial profiling. On April 26, 2016, Hamilton Councillor Matthew Green, a public official in Hamilton opposed to police carding, was carded by the Hamilton Police Service.

After a fact finding mission in October 2016, the United Nations' Working Group of Experts on People of African Descent expressed concerns that racial profiling is endemic to carding strategies and practices used by Canadian law enforcement.

On November 8, 2016, Mike Ellis, MLA for Calgary-West, stated that carding violates Section 9 of the Charter of Rights and Freedoms.

On January 9, 2017, Halifax Regional Police released statistics showing police were three times as likely to card blacks than whites. Nova Scotia premier Stephen McNeil responded, "I don't think it's acceptable anywhere. I think I was startled, like most Nova Scotians, by the stats that were brought out". Mayor Michael Savage said the numbers concerned him, and he would press the force to gather more information to determine why the checks were done and what police were looking for. In April 2017 the Nova Scotia Human Rights Commission announced that it will lead an investigation into the practice of carding in Halifax.

On June 14, 2015, the Union of British Columbia Indian Chiefs and the British Columbia Civil Liberties Association filed a complaint to the Office of the Police Complaint Commissioner of British Columbia over carding of Indigenous and black people in Vancouver. Both British Columbian Premier John Horgan and Vancouver Mayor Gregor Robertson have expressed concern over city police's use of street checks.

On September 26, 2018, Josh Paterson, executive director of the British Columbia Civil Liberties Association, told the Vancouver Police Board, "There has been a long-standing debate about whether street checks as one of the tools of policing are effective, and there is some evidence to show it's not necessarily that conclusive."

On March 27, 2019, the African Nova Scotian Decade for People of African Descent Coalition called for a moratorium on street checks until the lawfulness of existing practices has been clarified.

In August 2019, the City of Montreal released a report finding systemic bias in street checks performed by officers of the Service de police de la Ville de Montréal, the police force for the city of Montreal, Quebec, during 2014–2017. Indigenous and black people were shown to be between 4 and 5 times more likely to be carded than white people, while Indigenous women constitute a group particularly targeted, 11 times more likely to be questioned by the SVPM than white women.

On July 16, 2019, Victoria councillors unanimously approved a motion that calls on the Victoria Police Department to end street checks in Victoria. The motion notes that the practice of street checks goes against the city's strategic plan of creating a welcoming environment for all people, and highlights that police boards and police departments should take into account the priorities of local communities when establishing operational policies.

== Oversight ==
There is an ongoing debate around what ability police boards have to influence carding operations:

- The Hamilton Police Services Board moved to suspend the practice of carding while the province reviews, but it was stopped by the police service's lawyer. Instead the board moved to request an information report on best practices as it pertains to policy around Community Street Checks. Shortly thereafter, Chief Glenn De Caire refused to implement an interim policy governing carding that was adopted from the Toronto Police Services Board.
- The Peel Police Services Board passed a recommendation that the chief stop carding, but the Chief Jennifer Evans said she will not follow their recommendation.
- On November 22, 2016, the London City Council formally asked Chief of Police John B. Pare to ban the London Police Service practice of random street checks.

On August 13, 2015, the London diversity and race relations advisory committee met to discuss carding practices in the city, though the London Police Service officer dedicated to race relations did not attend the meeting.

In the 2016/2017 Annual Report for the Office of the Police Complaint Commissioner, the British Columbia Office of the Police Complaint Commissioner cited ongoing concerns with the collection of identifying information by police, and expressed an expectation that either the Vancouver Police Board or the Legislative Assembly of British Columbia would create a policy on carding. On June 14, 2018, Vancouver Police Chief Adam Palmer ordered an investigation into complaints from the British Columbia Civil Liberties Association and the Union of B.C. Indian Chiefs that carding practices are unfairly targeting minorities. A public report will be submitted to the Vancouver Police Board September 20, 2018.

On September 18, 2017, the Nova Scotia Human Rights Commission selected an independent expert, Dr. Scot Wortley, of the University of Toronto Centre for Criminology and Sociolegal Studies to undertake an investigation into the Halifax Regional Police Service's use of street checks and the impact such checks may have on the Black community, the final report is expected in the Fall of 2018. On March 27, 2019, the Halifax, Nova Scotia: Street Checks Report was tabled at the Halifax Central Library. The report notes that "Every year from 2006 to 2017, Black people have been five to six times more likely to appear in street check statistics than their representation in the general population would predict."

On June 6, 2018, the Saskatchewan Police Commission created policy OC 150 Contact Interviews with the Public, which constrains carding based on an individual's race or location. On September 21, 2018, Saskatoon police Chief Troy Cooper rejected requests from University of Saskatchewan law professor Glen Luther to record the race of carded individuals, stating "We know that people and agencies that have tried to do that get a lot of inaccurate data because it relies on the officer's description and perception of race, and that's often inaccurate". On October 5, 2018, Saskatoon police Chief Troy Cooper stated that Saskatoon police officers will soon be trained in how to conduct contact interviews.

In 2017, the Edmonton Police Association published an open letter to the city of Edmonton defending carding. CBC news stated that the letter was written "in response to recent data obtained by CBC Edmonton showing Edmonton police from 2012 to 2016 disproportionately stopped, questioned and documented people of colour who were not suspected of a crime." On June 27, 2018, the Edmonton Police Commission released the City of Edmonton Street Check Policy and Practice Review prepared by Curt Griffiths of the Simon Fraser University School of Criminology. On October 29, 2018, the Edmonton Police Service responded to the street check review. In this response, the service provided implementation dates for 7 of the 17 recommendations.

On December 31, 2018, the Ontario Ministry of the Solicitor General released the Report of the Independent Street Checks Review 2018 prepared by Judge Michael H. Tulloch of the Court of Appeal for Ontario.

On January 4, 2019, the Ontario Provincial Police Association issued a press release stating that "racism and arbitrary street checks have no place in policing".

On March 13, 2019, the Halifax Board of Police Commissioners placed a request to the Nova Scotia Human Rights Commission to review the legality of police street checks; the Nova Scotia Human Rights Commission confirmed that J. Michael MacDonald, former Chief Justice of the Nova Scotia Court of Appeal, agreed to help with the review.

== Regulation ==
On 16 June 2015, Ontario announced that it will develop a new regulation to regulate police street checks. The Ministry of the Solicitor General has held a series of five workshop-style public meetings across the province:

22 October 2015, during debate in the Legislative Assembly of Ontario, Yasir Naqvi, minister of community safety and correctional services, announced that regulation banning random street checks would be in place by the end of the fall, and will become part of the Police Services Act, and includes:

- Stronger guidelines for police who conduct street checks as part of an investigation or because of suspicious activity.
- Rules guaranteeing that charter rights are protected for anyone who is checked.
- Clear rules on how police can collect carding data, use the data, as well as the length of time the data can be stored.

On 28 October 2015, the Ministry of the Solicitor General, posted two draft regulations for public input on the random and arbitrary collection of identifying information by police. On 30 November 2015, a coalition of community organisations and individuals issued a joint response to the draft regulation, articulating a rights-based framework for policing aimed at prohibiting carding, which they deemed discriminatory against minorities in Canada.

On 8 December 2015, the Ontario Association of Chief of Police's Board of Directors unanimously passed a submission on Proposed Regulations to the Police Services Act: "Collection of Identifying Information in Certain Circumstances – Prohibition and Duties" and Proposed Amendments to the Schedule to O.Reg. 268/10 (Code of Conduct).

On 21 March 2016, the Ministry of the Solicitor General, filed Ontario Regulation 58/16: Collection of Identifying Information in Certain Circumstances – Prohibition and Duties, which sets out rules for carding. The Government of Ontario will also launch a multi-year academic study on the impact of carding.

On 24 March 2016, the African Canadian Legal Clinic, issued a press release stating that the new regulation "fails to fully and finally provide adequate protection for the fundamental rights and freedoms of African Canadians".

On 12 April 2016, the Board of Directors of the Toronto Police Association, issued a memo to its membership stating that the new regulation is "counterproductive to proactive community engagement and crime prevention".

On 17 November 2016, the Toronto Police Services Board revised policy 250: Regulated Interaction with the Community and the Collection of Identifying Information to ensure compliance with Ontario Regulation 58/16, the Police Services Act, the Canadian Charter of Rights and Freedoms, the Ontario Human Rights Code, and the Municipal Freedom of Information and Protection of Privacy Act (MFIPPA). In addition the policy restricted service members from accessing Historical Contact Data, except as needed to provide an auditable trail as required by law (e.g. evidence in a matter before the courts).

On 17 May 2017, the Ministry of the Solicitor General appointed Justice Michael Tulloch of the Ontario Court of Appeal to conduct an independent review of Ontario Regulation 58/16. Tulloch's report into the challenges and validity of police carding is expected to be produced in January 2019. As part of this review, twelve public consultations are to be held between 1 February 2018 and 23 April 2018 in the Greater Toronto Area, and in Thunder Bay, Brampton, Hamilton, Ajax, Markham, Windsor, London, Ottawa and Sudbury.

On 24 August 2017, Kathleen Ganley, as Minister of Justice and Solicitor General of Alberta, announced that the government will begin a six-week consultation process for drafting provincial guidelines for police street checks and the associated collection of personally identifiable information. On 3 February 2019, David Khan, leader of the Alberta Liberal Party, expressed disappointment that after 18 month, this process has not yet produced tangible results.

On 18 September 2017, the Nova Scotia Human Rights Commission hired University of Toronto criminology professor Scot Wortley, to conduct an independent review of street checks conducted by the Halifax Regional Police. The deadline for releasing findings was originally 7 January 2019, but this release has been postponed until 27 March 2019.

On 4 October 2017, Liberal MPP Nathalie Des Rosiers (Ottawa—Vanier) introduced a private member's bill (Bill 164, Human Rights Code Amendment Act, 2017), which expands human rights protections in a number of ways, including making it illegal to discriminate against individuals that have been carded by police.

On 6 June 2018, the Saskatchewan Police Commission issued policy OC150 - Contact Interviews with the Public.

On 28 March 2019, the Attorney General and Justice Minister of Nova Scotia Mark Furey, issued a provincial moratorium on street check quotas, and the use of street checks as a performance measurement tool On 17 April 2019, Furey, issued a provincial moratorium on street checks.

15 January 2020, the Attorney General of British Columbia introduced interim section 6.2.1 of the Provincial Policing Standards, requiring the police board or, in the case of the provincial police force, the commissioner, must officers with written policy that ensures interactions with community members, remain consistent with the Canadian Charter of Rights and Freedoms and the values they reflect.

On 7 April 2021, the Justice Minister of Alberta Kaycee Madu introduced Bill 63, the Police (Street Checks and Carding) Amendment Act, 2021.

== Responses ==
In 2015, Christien Levien, a law school graduate, created Legalswipe, an app that draws from the Canadian Civil Liberties Association's "know your rights" handbook, and guides people through police encounters.

On 17 January 2017, University of Toronto criminologists Anthony Doob and Rosemary Gartner presented a report "Understanding the impact of Police Stops" to the Toronto Police Services Board, among the conclusions was that benefits from carding are "substantially outweighed by convincing evidence of the harm of such practices both to the person subject to them and to the long term and overall relationship of the police to the community".

In April 2021, the Native Counselling Services of Alberta released a wallet-sized card to help Indigenous people know their rights if stopped by police

== Variants ==
- In 2016, the Office of the Police Complaint Commissioner, British Columbia, raised concerns that the Vancouver Police Department's Restaurant Watch program, also known as Bar Watch or the Inadmissible Patron Program, is a new form of street check or carding.
- On June 13, 2019, Jamal Boyce, a conflict studies and human rights student at the University of Ottawa, was carded and handcuffed by campus security for over two hours for not having identification. In response, on September 4, 2019, University of Ottawa President and Vice-Chancellor Jacques Frémont announced the revision of Policy 33, Section 8, which permits campus security to request proof of identity from people on campus.
- As of March 31, 2020, Ontario Regulation 114/20 made under the Emergency Management and Civil Protection Act requires individuals to provide identification upon demand from a provincial offences officer, which includes police officers, First Nations constables, special constables and municipal by-law enforcement officers, failing to correctly identify oneself carries a fine of $750. The Toronto Star reported that some saw this a signaling a return to police carding. Unless it is extended, The order was revoked on June 30, 2020.
- On June 10, 2020, New Brunswick Public Safety Minister Carl Urquhart introduced Bill 49 - An Act to Amend the Emergency Measures Act. Section 7 augmented police authority to allow officers to stop, investigate, and document individuals without reason. In response to widespread criticism, on June 15, 2020, New Brunswick Premier Blaine Higgs, announced that the government would no longer proceed with Bill 49.
- In Alberta, under the Traffic Safety Act, peace officers have the right to, without any reason, stop pedestrians using or located on a highway and request their names and addresses. They also have the right to arrest without a warrant anyone who fails to comply with "section 166(4) relating to the requirement that a pedestrian furnish to a peace officer who is readily identifiable as a peace officer the pedestrian's name and address when so required by the peace officer". There is a similar provision for passengers of vehicles. However, they need only provide their names and addresses, and may refuse requests for other information.

== See also ==
- Stop and frisk
- Stop and search, a UK equivalent.
- Stop-and-frisk in New York City
- Stop and identify statutes
- Sus law
- Ticket quota
