= University of Ottawa Students' Union =

Canadian student organization

- Syndicat étudiant de l'Université d'Ottawa
- Abbreviation: UOSU
- Predecessor: Student Federation of the University of Ottawa
- Formation: 2018
- Type: Nonprofit organization
- Purpose: Student association
- Headquarters: 7–85 University Private, Ottawa, Ontario K1N 6N5
- Location: University of Ottawa
- Members: 40,000+ (2026-2027)
- President: Elnaz Enayatpour
- Executive Director: Meredith Kerr
- Chair of the Board: Savrup Kaur Saran
- Website: seuo-uosu.com

The University of Ottawa Students' Union, commonly referred to as the UOSU (French: Syndicat étudiant de l'Université d'Ottawa; SÉUO) is the student organization representing undergraduate students of the University of Ottawa. A student referendum was held in 2019, designating the UOSU as the successor to the Student Federation of the University of Ottawa, after the University of Ottawa terminated its agreement with the SFUO due to allegations of fraud.

== History ==
=== Student Federation of the University of Ottawa ===
The SFUO represented University of Ottawa undergraduate students from 1969 to 2018. It was a not-for-profit organization, incorporated under the Ontario Corporations' Act. On August 9, 2018, La Rotonde, the university's French-language newspaper, reported that the Ottawa Police Service was investigating members of the SFUO and its executive for fraud. Subsequently, on August 10, the university announced it was withholding their funding until an audit into the allegations could be completed. Due to fraud and embezzlement allegations, the University of Ottawa announced that it would terminate its agreement with SFUO.

On September 25, 2018, the University of Ottawa provided the Federation with a 90-day notice of termination of their contract, citing insufficient progress and further allegations of workplace misconduct, internal conflict, and improper governance. The announcement noted that, as of December 24th, 2018, the Federation would no longer be recognized as the official representative of students, and invited students who wished to establish successor organizations to come forward.

The SFUO offices closed on April 10, 2019. An equitable court receiver was appointed to officially dissolve the federation.

Notable past presidents of the organization included Marcel Prud'homme (1958–59), André Ouellet (1959–60), Allan Rock (1969–70), Hugh Segal (1970–71), Denis Paradis (1974–75), Mauril Bélanger (1977–79), Anne McGrath (1979–80), Bernard Drainville (1984–85), Gilles Marchildon (1987–88), Maxime Pedneaud-Jobin (1990–91) and Guy Caron (1992–94).

=== Founding and subsequent history ===
To determine whether or not the SFUO could remain in place, the university organized a referendum to decide which organization should represent undergraduate students. The newly organized University of Ottawa Students' Union ran on decreasing politicization, increasing student power, and decreasing centralization within the Union. Meanwhile, the SFUO believed that it was best positioned to maintain the services and resources that students had access to. UOSU won the referendum overwhelmingly.

The university then signed a new agreement with UOSU, outlining additional oversight and financial transparency measures, and recognizing it as the sole voice of undergraduate students at the university.

In 2020, the position of President was established, with Babacar Faye as its inaugural office holder.

== Governance ==
The University of Ottawa Students' Union is a not-for-profit organization, incorporated in Canadian corporate law under the Canada Not-for-profit Corporations Act. The organization itself is governed by its Constitution, which establishes its political apparatus and component organs.

=== General Assembly ===
The General Assembly (GA) is the highest governing body within UOSU and is composed of all of the members of the Union. The General Assembly meets twice annually, once in the fall and winter semesters, respectively. Except as limited by the Constitution, the GA may pass resolutions that bind the Board and executive committee. The GA has authority over amending UOSU's Constitution.

=== Board of Directors ===
The Board of Directors governs and provides oversight to UOSU. It comprises up to 30 members that serve 1-year terms: a President; 5 Commissioners; 22 Directors elected from their faculties; 1 Indigenous Director, elected through a nomination from the Indigenous Students' Association; 1 International Student Director. Each faculty has between 1 and 5 Directors. There is 1 unallocated seat on the Board of Directors, since the removal of the Equity Commissioner role.

There is a public Board meeting session held every month; much of its responsibilities are delegated to various committees, which are either enshrined in the organization's constitution or formed as ad hoc committees, each focusing on a specific field or area of concern.

=== Executive Committee ===
The executive committee (EXEC) manages the day-to-day operations of UOSU, with specific jurisdiction over human resources and signing contracts. The executive committee comprises 5 undergraduate students: the President, and four Commissioners. Each Commissioner is responsible for a specific aspect of the organization. They include the Francophone Affairs, Student Life, Advocacy, and Operations Commissioners.

2026-2027 Executive Committee
| Name | Faculty | Position |
|---|---|---|
| Elnaz Enayatpour | Social Sciences | President |
| Norah Bello (interim) | Science | Advocacy Commissioner |
| Dan Ngenzi Ya Ruty (interim) | Science and Social Sciences | Francophone Affairs Commissioner |
| Zach Lebel | Science and Social Sciences | Operations Commissioner |
| Hamza El Mendri | Engineering | Student Life Commissioner |

2025-2026 Executive Committee
| Name | Faculty | Position | | | | |
|---|---|---|---|---|---|---|
| Jack Coen | Social Sciences | President | | | | |
| Alex Stratas | Social Sciences | Advocacy Commissioner | | | | |
| Ève Tremblay | Social Sciences and Arts | Francophone Affairs Commissioner | | | | |
| Elnaz Enayatpour (interim) | Social Sciences | Operations Commissioner | - | Emilia Bah | Arts | Student Life Commissioner (interim; from May 1 - November) |
| Samar Mohamed Ahmed | Telfer | Student Life Commissioner (until May) | – | Kaitlin Ma (interim) | Social Sciences | Communications Commissioner |

2024-2025 Executive Committee
| Name | Faculty | Position |
|---|---|---|
| Delphine Robitaille | Social Sciences | President |
| vacant (until May 5, 2024) | – | Advocacy Commissioner |
| Sanjida Flora (interim; from May 6, 2024, to August) | Law | Advocacy Commissioner |
| Alex Stratas (from November 18, 2024) | Social Sciences | Advocacy Commissioner |
| Daphnée Veilleux-Michaud (until January) | Social Sciences | Francophone Affairs Commissioner |
| vacant (from January) | – | |
| vacant (until May 5, 2024) | – | Operations Commissioner |
| Greg Coleman (interim; from May 6, 2024) | Social Sciences | Operations Commissioner |
| vacant (until November 17, 2024) | – | Student Life Commissioner |
| Emilia Bah (from November 18, 2024) | Arts | Student Life Commissioner |
| vacant | – | Communications Commissioner |
| Anne-Moïse Gusnie Hyppolite (from November 18, 2024) | Social Sciences | Communications Commissioner |
| Imani Bunzigiye (until November) | Engineering | Equity Commissioner |

2023–2024 Executive Committee
| Name | Faculty | Position |
|---|---|---|
| vacant (until November 12, 2023) | – | President |
| Delphine Robitaille (from November 12, 2023) | Social Sciences | President |
| Maisy Elspeth (until March 8, 2024) | Science | Advocacy Commissioner |
| vacant (until May 28, 2023) | – | Francophone Affairs Commissioner |
| Amine El-Idrissi (interim; until November 12, 2023) | Social Sciences | Francophone Affairs Commissioner |
| Tristan Maldonado-Rodriguez (until March 8, 2024) | N/A (Note: Maldonado-Rodriguez was a non-degree student, meaning he did not belong to any specific faculty.) | Francophone Affairs Commissioner |
| Fiona Broughton (until August 25, 2023) | Arts | Operations Commissioner |
| Jessika Salambere (interim; from January 1, 2024) | Telfer School of Management | Operations Commissioner |
| vacant (until May 28, 2023) | – | Student Life Commissioner |
| Rayne Daprato (interim; elected on November 12, 2023) | Social Sciences | Student Life Commissioner |
| vacant (until November 12, 2023) | – | Clubs & Services Commissioner (Note: The position of Clubs & Services Commissioner was abolished after the passing of constitutional amendments at the organization's 2023 Autumn General Assembly and was subsequently replaced by the Communications Commissioner.) |
| Daniel Thorp (from November 12, 2023) | Engineering | Communications Commissioner |
| Joyce Williams (until November 12, 2023) | Telfer School of Management | Equity Commissioner |
| Imani Bunzigiye (interim; from January 1, 2024) | Engineering | Equity Commissioner |

2026-2027 Board of Directors
| Name | Faculty / Constituency | Role |
|---|---|---|
Executive Committee
| Elnaz Enayatpour | Social Sciences | President |
| Norah Bello (interim) | Science | Advocacy Commissioner |
| Dan Ngenzi Ya Ruty (interim) | Science and Social Sciences | Francophone Affairs Commissioner |
| Zach Lebel | Science and Social Sciences | Operations Commissioner |
| Hamza El Mendri | Engineering | Student Life Commissioner |
Faculty Directors
| Emma Brisson (Note: Brisson won the Faculty of Arts seat through a ranked instant-runoff ballot. In Round 3, she led with 146.74 votes (36.33%) versus Josh Klein's 145.80 (36.10%) and Adam Chambers' 111.34 (27.57%).) | Arts | Director |
| Josh Klein | Arts | Director |
| Agam Singh | Engineering | Director |
| Patricia Defo | Health Sciences | Director |
| Yesha Villanueva | Health Sciences | Director |
| Evan Hong | Science | Director |
| Kevin Joseph | Science | Director |
| Amy Park | Science | Director |
| Cédrik Desjardins | Social Sciences | Director |
| Kareem Mukbil | Social Sciences | Director |
| Alec Tweddell | Social Sciences | Director |
| vacant (Note: Christabel Ugolo received 89.09% approval in the Faculty of Social Sciences race but was a disqualified/withdrawn candidate and therefore unable to take the seat.) | Social Sciences | Director |
At-Large Directors
| Rani Betsiaroana | International Students | Director for International Students |
| Ben Cameron | Indigenous Students' Association nomination | Director for Indigenous Students |

2025-2026 Board of Directors
| Name | Faculty / Constituency | Role | |
|---|---|---|---|
Executive Committee
| Jack Coen | Social Sciences | President | |
| Alex Stratas | Social Sciences | Advocacy Commissioner | |
| Ève Tremblay | Social Sciences and Arts | Francophone Affairs Commissioner | |
| Elnaz Enayatpour (interim) | Social Sciences | Operations Commissioner | |
| Emilia Bah (interim) | Arts | Student Life Commissioner | |
| Kaitlin Ma (interim) | Social Sciences | Communications Commissioner | |
Faculty Directors
| Julianne LeBlanc | Arts | Director | |
| Emma Brisson | Arts | Director | |
| Matias Suxo Salinas | Engineering | Director | |
| Justin Patrick | Engineering | Director | |
| Jad Mghabghab | Engineering | Director | |
| Grace Tongue | Health Sciences | Director | |
| Yesha Villanueva | Health Sciences | Director | |
| Farah Mourad | Health Sciences | Director | |
| Zach Lebel | Science | Director | |
| Evan Hong | Science | Director | |
| Amy Park | Science | Director | |
| Maréme Diongue | Social Sciences | Director | |
| Ryan Chang | Social Sciences | Director | |
| Eli Zima Luste | Social Sciences | Director | |
| Lien Huynh | Social Sciences | Director | |
| Eyinojuoluwa Orolugbadgbe | Social Sciences | Director | |
| Jean Paul Azzi | Medicine | Director | |
At-Large Directors
| Kim Mantha | Indigenous Students' Association nomination | Director for Indigenous Students (September - May) | |
| Kassidy Klinger | Indigenous Students' Association nomination | Director for Indigenous Students (May - August) | – |

2024-2025 Board of Directors
| Name | Faculty / Constituency | Role |
|---|---|---|
Executive Committee
| Delphine Robitaille | Social Sciences | President |
| Alex Stratas (from November 18, 2024) | Social Sciences | Advocacy Commissioner |
| Daphnée Veilleux-Michaud (until January 2025) | Social Sciences | Francophone Affairs Commissioner |
| Greg Coleman (interim; from May 6, 2024) | Social Sciences | Operations Commissioner |
| Emilia Bah (from November 18, 2024) | Arts | Student Life Commissioner |
| Anne-Moïse Gusnie Hyppolite (from November 18, 2024) | Social Sciences | Communications Commissioner |
| Imani Bunzigiye (until November 2024) | Engineering | Equity Commissioner |
Faculty Directors
Full membership not available.
At-Large Directors
Full membership not available.

2023-2024 Board of Directors
| Name | Faculty / Constituency | Role |
|---|---|---|
Executive Committee
| Delphine Robitaille (from November 12, 2023) | Social Sciences | President |
| Maisy Elspeth (until March 8, 2024) | Science | Advocacy Commissioner |
| Tristan Maldonado-Rodriguez (until March 8, 2024) | N/A (Note: Maldonado-Rodriguez was a non-degree student, meaning he did not belong to any specific faculty.) | Francophone Affairs Commissioner |
| Jessika Salambere (interim; from January 1, 2024) | Telfer School of Management | Operations Commissioner |
| Rayne Daprato (interim; from November 12, 2023) | Social Sciences | Student Life Commissioner |
| Daniel Thorp (from November 12, 2023) | Engineering | Communications Commissioner |
| Imani Bunzigiye (interim; from January 1, 2024) | Engineering | Equity Commissioner |
Faculty Directors
Full membership not available.
At-Large Directors
Full membership not available.

=== Elections ===
General elections are held during the Winter term, either in February or March, to elect the board of directors and executive committee. By-elections are held in October or November to fill vacant Director and Executive positions.

==== 2026 ====
===== General Election =====
The 2026 General Elections saw a turnout of 11.25%, with 4,397 ballots cast out of 39,090 eligible electors. Elnaz Enayatpour was elected President with 74.92% of the vote, defeating Daniel Thorp. Hamza El Mendri was elected Student Life Commissioner; although the balloting was ruled non-compliant with sections 9.6.1 and 8.3.1 of the Elections Code pursuant to Lebel v Chief Electoral Officer, 2026 ACUOSU 08, El Mendri nonetheless won the confidence of the required threshold of electors. The Operations Commissioner race was declared entirely invalid under the same ruling. The Advocacy Commissioner race was won by Norah Bello, who had been disqualified or withdrawn prior to the vote.

On the Board of Directors, Emma Brisson won the Faculty of Arts seat through a ranked ballot. Agam Singh was elected for the Faculty of Engineering; Patricia Defo and Yesha Villanueva for the Faculty of Health Sciences; Evan Hong, Kevin Joseph, and Amy Park for the Faculty of Science; and Cédrik Desjardins, Kareem Mukbil, and Alec Tweddell for the Faculty of Social Sciences. Christabel Ugolo, also of Social Sciences, received 89.09% approval but was a disqualified candidate. Rani Betsiaroana was elected Director for International Students. Issra Idris was elected undergraduate representative to the University of Ottawa Board of Governors, winning a majority in the fifth round of ranked balloting. Evelyne Laforest (Law), Huy Nguyen (Science), and Akbar Imran (Social Sciences) were elected to the University Senate.

Fifteen referendum and plebiscite questions appeared on the ballot. The $2/semester free printing levy, the $6.50/semester club funding levy, and the termination of the Compass levy all passed. The OPIRG levy and the CHUO 89.1 levy were both rejected. Recognition of the TMMSA as a Recognized Student Government, along with its associated $9.63/semester levy, passed with near-unanimous support among eligible TMM students. Nine questions concerning accessibility and disability accommodation all passed with strong majorities.

==== 2025 ====
===== By-Election =====
The 2025 by-election is being held from October 6 to 10, 2025, to fill vacancies. Positions up for election include Communications, Student Life, and Operations Commissioners, as well as multiple Faculty Director and Senate seats. Two candidates were disqualified due to bilingualism requirements. Results are expected later in October.

===== General Election =====
The 2025 General Elections saw the highest voter turnout since 2020, with 10.63% of students casting a ballot. Jack Coen was elected president with 64.08% of the vote. Ève Tremblay narrowly won the race for Francophone Affairs Commissioner, while Alex Stratas was re-elected as Advocacy Commissioner. Several Executive positions, including Communications, Operations, and Student Life, remained vacant.

Only 10 Board of Directors seats were filled, with five elected from the Faculty of Social Sciences. Four students were elected to the University Senate, and Hazel Downey was elected to the University of Ottawa Board of Governors as the undergraduate representative.

Seven referendum questions appeared on the ballot. Three proposals passed: a $3 per semester Fund for Students with Disabilities, a $1.50 per semester levy for the Advocacy Fund, and the renaming of the Engineering Students' Society ancillary fee to the Engineering Endowment Fund.

==== 2024 ====
===== By-Election =====
2024 by-elections concluded October 14, 2024 with 8.47% voter turnout, the highest for a by-election in the union's short history. Three members were elected to the UOSU Executive Committee: Anne Hyppolite as Communications Commissioner, Alex Stratas as Advocacy Commissioner, and Emilia Bah as Student Life Commissioner.

===== General Election =====
General elections were held on February 18, 2024. Turnout was 6.74%. President Delphine Robitaille was re-elected unopposed. The Interim Equity Commissioner, Imani Bunzigiye, was elected to a full term, and Interim Francophone Affairs Commissioner was defeated by Daphnée Veilleux-Michaud. 3 Executive positions were left vacant: Student Life, Communications, and Advocacy Commissioner.

On May 6, 2024, the UOSU Board of Directors hired Greg Coleman as Operations Commissioner and Sanjida Flora as Advocacy Commissioner.

==== 2023 ====
===== By-Election =====
By-elections were held from October 9–14, 2023. Turnout was 7.7%. The positions of President, Student Life Commissioner, Francophone Affairs Commissioner and Communications Commissioner were filled. Additionally, five Director seats and three Senate seats were filled.

Students voted in 10 referendums during the by-elections. 9 of them passed, including an 11% reduction in Union fees, resulting in a $500,000 cut to its budget.

===== General Election =====
General elections were held from March 5–9, 2023. Turnout was 3.8%. Only one Executive Position was contested, with Joyce Williams being elected Equity Commissioner with 51.7% of the vote. The Operations and Advocacy Commissioners were elected unopposed.

== Clubs and Student Governments ==
=== Clubs ===
The organization recognizes over 360 different clubs and associations related to all aspects of student life, from powerlifting to chess to politics.

As of May 1st, 2025, the UOSU imposed a limit of 300 clubs as a result of pressure from Conventions & Reservations regarding their administrative capacity to handle the volume of room booking requests.

=== Recognized Student Governments ===
Recognized Student Governments (RSGs) are autonomous, student-led organizations affiliated with the UOSU. Each RSG represents undergraduate students from a specific faculty or department. Many RSGs function as unincorporated associations under the UOSU, while others are independently incorporated under the Ontario Not-for-Profit Corporations Act. RSGs collaborate with UOSU to coordinate campus-wide orientation initiatives, including 101 Week in September and Frost Week at the beginning of the winter term. RSGs are eligible to receive an annual operating grant of CA$14.47 per student, as of the 2024–2025 academic year, indexed to inflation.

The 27 RSGs are:

1. Aesculapian Society (ASoc)
2. Association des étudiant.es en nutrition (ADÉNUT)
3. Association des étudiant.es en service social (ADÉDÉSS)
4. Association des étudiants et étudiantes à la formation à l'enseignement (AÉÉFE)
5. Association des étudiantes et étudiants en droit civil de l'Outaouais (AÉD)
6. Common Law Students' Society (CLSS)
7. Communication Students' Association (CommSA)
8. Computer Science Students' Association (CSSA)
9. Conflict Studies and Human Rights Students' Association (CHRA)
10. Criminology Students' Association (CrimSA)
11. Economics Students' Association (ESA)
12. Engineering Students' Society (ESS)
13. Feminist and Gender Studies Student Association (FGSA)
14. Health Sciences Students' Association (HSSA)
15. Human Kinetics Students' Association (HKSA)
16. Indigenous Students' Association (ISA)
17. International Development and Globalization Students' Association (DSA)
18. International, Political, and Policy Studies Students' Association (IPPSSA)
19. Psychology Students' Association (PSA)
20. Sociology and Anthropology Students' Association (SASA)
21. Science Students' Association (SSA)
22. Students' Association of the Faculty of Arts (SAFA)
23. Telfer Students' Association (TSA)
24. Undergraduate Nursing Students' Association (UNSA)
25. Indigenous Law Student Governance (ILSG)
26. Association étudiante du Programme de droit canadien (AssoPDC)
27. Pharmaceutical Studies Students' Association (PharmSA)

Some larger RSGs, such as ESS, SAFA, and TSA, oversee subsidiary student governments that represent specific departments or programs within their faculties.

== Businesses and services ==
The UOSU operates businesses and service centres, many of which were inherited from the SFUO.

Services
| Name | Type | Description |
|---|---|---|
| Bike Co-op | Service | Cyclist resources and services |
| Centre for Students with Disabilities | Service | Disability rights advocacy |
| Clubs Administration Service | Service | Club regulation and management |
| Feminist Resource Centre | Service | Feminist advocacy and support |
| Food Bank | Service | Food bank |
| International House | Service | International students' rights advocacy |
| PIVIK | Business | Convenience store |
| Pride Centre | Service | LGBT+ advocacy |
| Racialized and Indigenous Students Experience Centre | Service | Multiracial and Indigenous advocacy and activism |
| Student Rights Centre | Service | Student-initiated appeals to the university administration |
| Sustainable Development Centre | Service | Environmental sustainability awareness |

Former services
| Name | Type | Description | Notes |
|---|---|---|---|
| Bilingualism Centre | Service | Second-language learning assistance and linguistic rights advocacy | Eliminated in 2024-2025 budget |
| Multi-Faith Centre | Service | Religious pluralist advocacy | Eliminated in 2024-2025 budget |
| Foot Patrol | Service | Volunteer-based safe walk service | Eliminated in 2024-2025 budget |
| Peer Help Centre | Service | Academic, personal, and social support | Eliminated in 2024-2025 budget |
| Zoom Productions | Service | Photography and Videography service for students | Dissolved on April 28, 2024, Board of Directors meeting. Equipment and staff were kept under the Communications Department. |

== Controversies ==
=== uOttawa Students for Life ===
In 2019, uOttawa Students for Life (UOSFL), a club that advocated against abortion rights on campus, received provisional club status, giving them funding from UOSU and the right to book spaces on campus, sparking controversy. A special General Assembly meeting was called when a petition demanding the Union remove club status from UOSFL and adopt a pro-choice stance was signed by 500 students and presented to the Union. The meeting failed to reach quorum. In January 2020, the Board of Directors stripped UOSFL of club status.

=== CHUO-FM referendum ===
During the October 2023 by-elections, UOSU members voted to eliminate a tuition levy that funded CHUO-FM, a local campus radio station. The levy was set at $4.99 per student, which accounted for between $360,000–$380,000 of annual funding, or around 80% of its total funding. The radio station criticized the decision, saying their survival was at risk, and the referendum was legally questionable.

At the General Assembly meeting following the referendum, the referendum was not ratified after the Board received legal advice to reject it. According to President-elect Delphine Robitaille, it would have been a "legal liability." There is no similar precedent for not ratifying referendum results. During the 2024 general elections, the referendum was approved again.

=== 2024-2025 service cuts ===
Following the Fall 2023 Elections, UOSU members approved a referendum forcing a 11.37 percent cut to UOSU student fees in the 2024–2025 school year. In part due to these cuts, UOSU's Budget 2024-2025 included the defunding and dissolution of four services: the Bilingualism Centre, the Peer Help Centre, Foot Patrol, and the Multifaith Centre. On June 24, 2024, the Francophone Affairs Commissioner, Daphnée Veilleux-Michaud, held an emergency meeting open to the public regarding the proposed closure of the Bilingualism Centre. A number of students, including club and student association executives attended the meeting. Operations Commissioner Greg Coleman, who had written the budget with UOSU President Delphine Robitaille, was the only board member to at the meeting other than Veilleux-Michaud. Reporters from the French-language student newspaper, La Rotonde, and a member from the student radio CHUO-FM were also present.

After the emergency meeting, Francophone students who felt that the budget cuts unfairly targeted them joined the Francophone Affairs Commissioner in writing an open letter, which was published in La Rotonde, criticizing the proposal. In particular, they felt the UOSU was putting Bike Co-op before them and suggested that this service should perhaps be defunded instead. Coincidentally, in The Fulcrum's article on the passage of the budget, an Anglophone Board of Directors member representing the Faculty of Social Sciences, James Adair, and the Operations Commissioner are pictured to the right of the President with Bike Co-op branded water bottles.

After the passage of the budget, La Rotonde published an article criticizing the outcome, calling into question the May 1 salary increase of UOSU executives to $23 per hour, and again suggesting that the Bike Co-op should have been cut instead. Less than a week later on July 6, La Rotonde published another open letter to the UOSU President, insisting that the budget included cuts to the Feminist Resource Centre that constituted "anti-feminist intellectual harassment." However, no cuts aimed at this service were included in the 2024-2025 budget.

== See also ==
- List of Ontario students' associations
