= John Wellington Pickup =

Canadian lawyer and judge

John Wellington Pickup (1892–1973) was a Canadian lawyer and judge. He was Chief Justice of Ontario from 1952 to 1957.

Born in Millbrok, Ontario, he studied as Osgoode Hall, graduating with the Gold Medal in 1913, and was called to the Bar the same year. He practised at Fasken in Toronto. In September 1952, he was appointed Chief Justice of Ontario directly from the Bar, succeeding his former law partner Robert Spelman Robertson. He retired in 1957.
