= G. Arthur Martin =

Canadian judge

Goldwin Arthur Martin
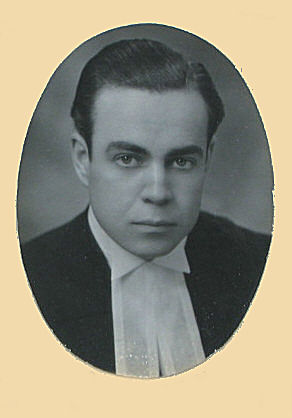
- Martin in 1938, on his graduation from Osgoode Hall Law School

Treasurer of the Law Society of Upper Canada
- In office 1970–1971
- Preceded by: William Goldwin Carrington Howland
- Succeeded by: Sydney Lewis Robins

Justice of the Court of Appeal for Ontario
- In office 1973–1988

Personal details
- Born: 17 May 1913 Huntsville, Ontario, Canada
- Died: 26 February 2001 (aged 87) Toronto, Ontario, Canada
- Occupation: Judge
- Known for: Criminal law

Goldwin (Note: Martin's name is sometimes spelled "Goldwyn". It is rendered "Goldwin" here as it appears in Martin's Order of Canada citation and in the title of his archival records housed at the Law Society of Ontario.) Arthur Martin CC QC (17 May 1913 – 26 February 2001) was a Canadian lawyer and judge who was known as an expert on criminal law. He was a judge of the Court of Appeal for Ontario from 1973 to 1988.

== Early life and education ==
Martin was born on 17 May 1913 in Huntsville, Ontario. He graduated from Osgoode Hall Law School in 1938 as gold medallist. He was called to the bar of Ontario in June of that year and to the bar of British Columbia in 1950.

== Career ==
Martin became a defence lawyer in 1940. He represented 60 people charged with murder and none were convicted of murder, although some were convicted of other offences. He was elected treasurer of the Law Society of Upper Canada in 1970. He was appointed to the Court of Appeal for Ontario in 1973, and retired in 1988.

John Arnup called Martin "the greatest criminal lawyer this country has produced". As a criminal defender, Martin developed techniques including the use of expert witnesses and the insanity defence.

In 1993, Martin chaired a royal commission on the use of plea bargaining in Ontario. The commission's recommendations enhanced the reputation of plea bargains, which had earlier been viewed with some suspicion by lawyers and judges.

Martin died on 26 February 2001 in Toronto.

== Awards ==
He was appointed an officer of the Order of Canada in 1991 and became a companion in 1997. He received honorary doctorates of law from Queen's University and the Law Society of Upper Canada.

The Ontario Criminal Lawyers' Association presents the G. Arthur Martin Criminal Justice Medal for an outstanding contribution to criminal justice.

== Sources ==
- Arnup, John D. (1988). Middleton: The Beloved Judge. McClelland & Stewart. ISBN 0-7710-0795-7. OCLC 19742237.
