= Irving Meretsky =

Canadian basketball player (1912–2006)

- Canadian Team Photo, circa 1936

Personal information
- Born: May 17, 1912 Windsor, Ontario
- Died: May 18, 2006 (aged 94)

Career information
- High school: Patterson Collegiate, Windsor
- College: Assumption College, Windsor
Medals
Men's basketball
Representing Canada
Olympic Games
Silver medal – second place	1936 Berlin	Team competition

Irving "Toots" Meretsky (May 17, 1912 – May 18, 2006) was a Canadian basketball player who won the first and to this date only silver medal for Canada in the first Olympic basketball competition, playing forward as a part of the 1936 Summer Olympics in Berlin.

== Biography ==
Born in Windsor, Ontario on May 17, 1912, his pinnacle of athletic success was winning the silver medal for Canada in the 1936 Olympics, playing in two games. He was one of only around nine Jewish Olympians from six countries who won medals at the Berlin games conducted by the Nazis while Adolf Hitler was Chancellor. Many athletes had boycotted the games protesting Nazi rule, and the games were particularly noteworthy as Germany had instigated the anti-Semitic Nuremberg Laws one year earlier in September, stripping German Jews of their citizenship, rights to a public education, their access to many professions including law, medicine, and theatre, and their ability to marry German citizens. The following month the same laws were applied to Blacks and Romani living in Germany. Jewish businesses had been boycotted, forcing many to close, and Jews could not vote, hold office, or be treated in municipal hospitals.

=== Olympic final ===
The Berlin Olympic final concluded the first official Olympic Basketball competition, with Canada losing the final to the United States, 19-8. Meretsky and his team were given temporary bronze participation medals, but did not receive an official replica of the silver medal from the Olympic Committee until 60 years later in 1996. At the games, the medals were awarded by James Naismith, the inventor of basketball. The game was low scoring, as it was played outdoors in a converted tennis stadium with clay courts that had become somewhat muddy after a heavy rain, making dribbling and ball handling difficult. Meretsky noted that the American's height advantage was difficult to overcome, as at the time rules required each score to be followed by a jump at center court.

Meretsky graduated from Windsor's Patterson Collegiate, where he played basketball and was a football quarterback, and then attended Assumption College. Meretsky's team at Assumption won the Michigan-Ontario League and Ontario Senior Men’s titles before losing in the Eastern Canadian Finals to Montreal. Meretsky was the team’s second leading scorer.

Prior to the Olympics, in 1935-36, he played for Windsor Ford V-8's, the Canadian Senior Men's Champions, defeating Victoria Dominoes in the finals, 3-0 in a best of five series played in Windsor. Meretsky was the overall leading scorer. This team was selected to play in the Olympics.

He concluded his playing career in British Columbia, as player/coach for Port Alberni, the British Columbia Finalist for the 1939–40 and 1940-41 seasons.

Following his final season with Port Alberni, Meretsky returned to Windsor to manage a family business. He continued to remain involved in basketball, coaching Windsor’s Shaar Hashomayim Synagogue’s team to the Ontario Basketball Association Bantam title in 1952-53.

== Honors ==
He was inducted into the Windsor/Essex Country Sports Hall of Fame in 1996 and the Canadian Basketball Hall of Fame as a member of the 1936 Ford V-8's.

He is the uncle of lawyer Harvey Thomas Strosberg. His grandson, Christopher Meretsky, was a first line hockey player for Auburn University.

== See also ==
- List of select Jewish basketball players
