= Susan Elliott (judge) =

Canadian judge (born 1953)

54th Treasurer of the Law Society of Upper Canada
- In office 1995–1997
- Preceded by: Paul Stephen Andrew Lamek
- Succeeded by: Harvey Thomas Strosberg

Personal details
- Born: August 8, 1953 (age 73) Kingston, Ontario, Canada
- Education: Kingston Collegiate and Vocational Institute; Queen's University at Kingston (BComm 1975); University of Ottawa (LLB 1979)
- Occupation: lawyer
- Website: https://www.fct-cf.gc.ca/en/pages/about-the-court/members-of-the-court/judges/the-honourable-e-susan-elliott

Eleanor "Susan" Elliott (born August 8, 1953) is a Canadian judge who has served on the Federal Court of Canada since 2015.

== Career ==
Elliott was called to the bar in 1981. She was a lawyer at Good Elliott Hawkins LLP in Kingston, Ontario from 1981 until she was appointed to the court. She became a bencher in 1991 and was elected the 54th Treasurer of the Law Society of Upper Canada, the second woman to have served the role, serving from 1995 to 1997.

On June 26, 2015, Elliott was appointed as judge of the Federal Court of Canada. She replaced Mary J. L. Gleason who was elevated to the Federal Court of Appeal.

== Awards and recognition ==
Elliott was the first person to receive the Laura Legge award from the Law Society of Ontario in 2008. She was awarded the Law Society of Upper Canada's top honour, the Law Society Medal.

Her Law Society portrait was painted by Trevor Goring.
