= Harvey Thomas Strosberg =

Canadian lawyer

Harvey T. Strosberg
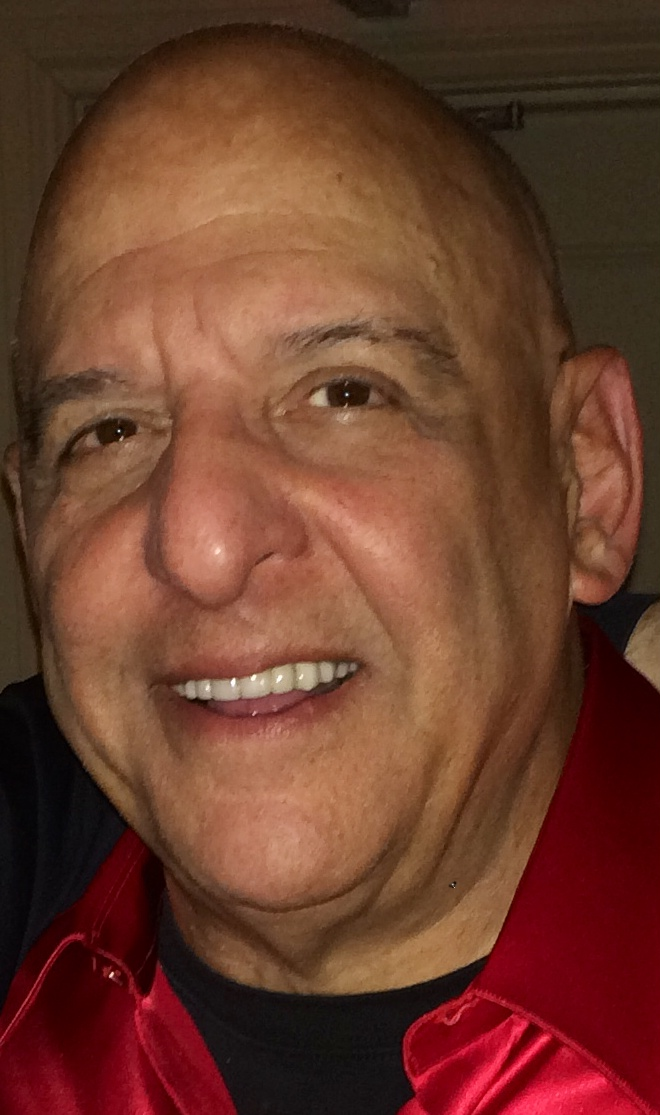

55th Treasurer of the Law Society of Upper Canada
- In office 1997–1999
- Preceded by: Eleanor Susan Elliott
- Succeeded by: Robert Patrick Armstrong

Personal details
- Born: Harvey Thomas Strosberg; September 1, 1944 (age 82) Windsor, Ontario, Canada
- Education: University of Windsor (B.Sc); Osgoode Hall Law School (LL.B)
- Occupation: lawyer
- Website: https://www.strosbergco.com/

Harvey Thomas Strosberg, KC (born September 1, 1944) is a Canadian lawyer. He is a senior partner at the law firm of Strosberg, Sasso, Sutts LLP.

== Early life ==
Harvey Strosberg was born to Philip and Sylvia Strosberg. His mother Sylvia was born Ida Sylvia Meretsky, part of a large family that was among the first Jewish families to settle in Windsor, Ontario in the 1880s. Harvey was raised in Windsor, Ontario, and graduated from Kennedy Collegiate Institute. At Kennedy Collegiate Institute, he was an avid participant in team sports, including football, basketball and track and field. He earned a Bachelor of Science degree from the University of Windsor and a Bachelor of Laws degree from Osgoode Hall Law School.

== Legal career ==
Strosberg was an articling student for John Sopinka on Bay Street in Toronto, Ontario before Sopinka became a justice of the Supreme Court of Canada.

Strosberg was called to the bar in 1971 and became a Queen's Counsel in 1982.

Strosberg served as Commission Counsel to Mr. Justice Horace Krever in the Royal Commission of Inquiry into the Confidentiality of Health Records in Ontario (1977-1980).

Strosberg has been a bencher of the Law Society of Upper Canada since 1987 and was its 55th Treasurer from 1997–1999. His portrait at the Law Society was painted by Curtis Hooper.

Strosberg was named a Fellow of the American College of Trial Lawyers in 1991.

Strosberg has recovered more than $3.6 billion for his class action clients. Mr. Strosberg was co-lead counsel in the Hepatitis C class action, co-lead counsel in the YBM Magnex securities class action, co-lead counsel in the Vitamins price fixing class action and lead counsel in the Money Mart class action. He has also acted or is acting as lead or co-lead counsel in class actions against, among others, The Bank of Nova Scotia, Merck & Co., Inc., Guidant Corporation, NovaGold Resources Inc., Ford, General Motors, VW in the Volkswagen emissions scandal and the Federal Government of Canada. A part of the VW case settled for $2.1 billion.

Strosberg was recognized by Lexpert as one of Canada's top 25 commercial litigation counsel. He was appointed by the Ontario Superior Court of Justice as Plaintiff's Counsel Representative to oversee the administration of a class action settlement relating to the Walkerton tragedy and as a member of the Joint Committee overseeing the administration of the Hepatitis C class action settlement.

Strosberg's and his partner David Robins represented wrongfully convicted persons including William Mullins-Johnson, Anthony Hanemaayer, Robert Baltovich and James Driskell in their civil lawsuits.

In 2010, Strosberg secured the largest cost award in Canadian history, $11 million to the plaintiff's lawyers.

In October 2010, Mr. Strosberg suffered a debilitating stroke, which took away his ability to speak. His recovery has allowed him to return to the courtroom. In 2012 he was lead plaintiff's counsel in Mandeville et al. v. Manufacturers Life Insurance Company.

Strosberg has been partners with some of the most accomplished lawyers in Canada. Mr. Strosberg's former partners include Allan Rock and Patrick Ducharme.

== Academic career ==
Strosberg taught a course in class action law at the University of Windsor law school with his partner David Robins and until recently, lectured annually at the University of Ottawa.

== Public service ==
In 1995, Strosberg served as the first Board chair of LPIC, the organization which eventually became LawPro. He led the investigation into and proposed the solution to the Law Society of Upper Canada's approximately $154 million insurance fund deficit.

He served as a member of the Board of Directors for Legal Aid Ontario (1999–2002).

He has also been a panelist at the Ontario Bar Association Cross Border Litigation Program, the Metropolitan Toronto Law Association Class Action Update, the American Bar Association, the Canadian Council on International Law and the Superior Court of Ontario Seminar for Judges.

== Awards and honours ==
Strosberg's work as a civil litigator has been widely recognized in the form of honorary degrees and medals. In 2002 the Law Society of Upper Canada awarded him an Honorary LLD. He received a DCL from the University of Windsor in 2003. He also received an LLD from Assumption University (Windsor, Ontario) in 2004.

Strosberg was awarded the Law Society Medal in 2010.

Most recently, one year after he suffered the stroke, he was awarded the Ontario Bar Association Award of Excellence in Civil Litigation in 2011. His speech was delivered at the Fairmont Royal York Hotel.

== Personal life ==
Strosberg is married to Cathy Strosberg. His first marriage to Betty Strosberg ended in divorce. Strosberg had three children with Betty: Elaine, Sharon and Jay. They all went on to become lawyers as well.

He is the nephew of Olympian Irving Meretsky.

Strosberg was introduced to Eddie Greenspan by his first wife Betty Strosberg, who grew up with him in Niagara Falls, Ontario. They went on to become lifelong friends. Strosberg was also friends with Edward Ducharme of the Ontario Court of Appeal and Paul Stephen Andrew Lamek of the Ontario Superior Court of Justice, and delivered both of their eulogies.

== Bibliography ==
- The Class Action Struggle Continues: Challenges for Canadian Class Actions into the Millennium; Report to Convocation on Insurance (1996)
- Tort Actions Among Family Members (with Kathryn L. McKerlie) in The Law Society of Upper Canada's Special Lectures (1993)
- Family Law: Roles, Fairness and Equality Programme (1993).

Strosberg is currently the editor of the Canadian Class Action Review.
