= Janet M. Simmons =

Canadian judge

Janet M. Simmons is a justice of the Court of Appeal for Ontario. She is a graduate of University of Toronto Faculty of Law. She has been a judge in Ontario since 1990, previously serving on the Court of Ontario.

== See also ==
- Law of Canada
- List of acts of the Parliament of Canada
- Statutes of Canada
