= Arthur Scace =

Canadian lawyer & jurist (1938–2020)

- Born: Arthur Richard Andrew Scace; 22 July 1938; Toronto, Ontario
- Died: 3 May 2020 (aged 81); Toronto, Ontario
- Education: University of Toronto (BA 1960); Harvard University (MA 1961); Oxford University (BA 1963); Osgoode Hall (LLB 1965)
- Spouse: Susan Margaret Kernohan (m. 1963)

Arthur Richard Andrew Scace QC CM (22 July 1938 – 3 May 2020) was a lawyer and jurist in Toronto, Ontario, Canada. He was the chairman of the board of directors of the Bank of Nova Scotia and is the board director of the Canadian Opera House Corporation. After graduating from the University of Toronto Schools, he studied at the University of Toronto for a B.A., at the University of Oxford for a B.A., at Osgoode Hall Law School for an LL.B. and at Harvard University for an M.A. While at the University of Toronto, he was a leader in the Deke fraternity. He also has an honorary degree in the law, the LLD. He obtained the honor of Queen's Counsel on 26 June 1986.

Scace has been partner, managing partner, and chairman of McCarthy Tétrault, a law firm founded 11 years before Canadian Confederation.

Scace was elected treasurer of the Law Society of Upper Canada in 1986.

== See also ==
- List of treasurers of the Law Society of Upper Canada
