= Fulcrum (newspaper) =

Student newspaper at the University of Ottawa

The Fulcrum
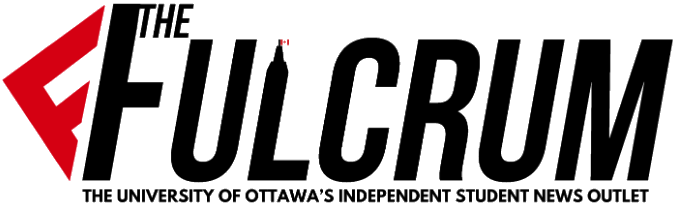
- Type: Weekly student newspaper
- Format: Newspaper
- Owner: The Fulcrum Publishing Society
- Editor-in-chief: Alexandrea Abungin & Bhoomi Dahiya
- Founded: 1942; 84 years ago
- Language: English
- Headquarters: 631 King Edward Avenue; Ottawa, Ontario; K1N 6N5
- Circulation: Online only
- Website: thefulcrum.ca

The Fulcrum is the English language student newspaper at the University of Ottawa. The paper dates back to 1942 and co-exists on the bilingual campus with La Rotonde, the University of Ottawa's French newspaper. The two newspapers are not simply translated copies of the same material, rather, the two are completely separate—and sometimes rivalling—entities.

The newspaper covers news, arts and culture, and sports information relevant to University of Ottawa students and nearby community, online and on their social media.

The Fulcrum is a member of the Canadian University Press (CUP), and recently hosted NASH 70 (the 70th annual Canadian University Press National Conference) in January, 2008. At NASH 71, held in Saskatoon during January 2009, the Fulcrum officially became the sister paper of the Muse at Memorial University. At NASH 76, held in Edmonton during January 2014, the Fulcrum won the bid to host NASH 77, titled "ACCESS," in January, 2015.

The Fulcrum was awarded the Student Publication of the Year in 2019 at NASH 81 hosted by The Gauntlet Publications Society at the University of Calgary for the paper's coverage of the Students' Federation of the University of Ottawa (SFUO) embezzlement scandal.

The Fulcrum was again awarded the Student Publication of the Year in 2025 at NASH 87 hosted by The Silhouette in part due to the paper's coverage of the pro-Palestinian encampment on Tabaret Lawn.

== The Fulcrum debuts ==
In 1942, The University of Ottawa's English Debating Society published the inaugural edition of their newsletter, entitled The Fulcrum. The newsletter was supervised by Rev. Lorenzo Danis, OMI, and its first editor-in-chief was John Beahen. The premiere edition included as its mission statement the following: "The Fulcrum is dedicated entirely to the interests of our students of today and yesterday."

In its first year, The Fulcrum was funded almost entirely by alumni donations and published only 8 issues per year. Due to its conservative Catholic editorial policies, The Fulcrum was fairly non-controversial compared to its more outspoken counterpart, La Rotonde. The inclusion of advertising starting in its second year allowed the paper some slight financial freedom and The Fulcrum continued in this manner until 1946, when it came under the supervision of the English Students' Association and the SFUO. In 1947, The Fulcrum became a member of the Canadian University Press, a national cooperative linking student newspapers across Canada.

== In the 50s and 60s ==
In 1951, the SFUO (suffering from serious financial problems) proposed that The Fulcrum and La Rotonde be combined into one publication and renamed The Ottawa. The proposal was rejected, but operations at the two papers were condensed into one workspace in the house the SFUO occupied at the time.

Throughout the 1950s, La Rotonde and the University of Ottawa administration had a combative relationship, inciting the Canadian University Press to label La Rotonde as "the most censored student newspaper in Canada" in 1956. The ill-will between the two groups reached a climax in 1958, when three editors from La Rotonde were expelled for an article criticizing Queen Elizabeth II. La Rotonde ceased publishing after this and was not re-formed again until January 1959. Despite the atmosphere on campus, The Fulcrum continued to publish during this time.

Both The Fulcrum and La Rotonde continued to publish unabated throughout most of the 1960s, with La Rotonde continuing with its outspoken approach, and The Fulcrum often playing the mediator and aiming criticism at both parties. However, this began to change in 1964, when the University of Ottawa administration censored an article in La Rotonde espousing the opinion that Queen Elizabeth II was not welcome in Quebec. The Fulcrum spoke out on the issue and in an editorial at the time stated that: "We feel that the administration should have given the publishers of La Rotonde a chance to act. The publishers (the Students' Union) are the ones who should have the right to confiscate an issue of a student newspaper, or any part thereof". Following from this, The Fulcrum became a more outspoken voice on campus.

In 1969, both publications were canceled and replaced with a bilingual monthly entitled Id, directed by Ian Green. The official reason for the cancellation of The Fulcrum and La Rotonde and the subsequent launch of Id was a lack of student interest in both newspapers; however, it was during this time that Canada was enveloped in the polarizing events of the October crisis, and many attribute the climate on campus and cancellation of the opposing-language newspapers to these events.

== In the 70s, 80s, and 90s ==
In 1970, both newspapers were re-instated and continued to publish regularly as services of the Student Federation of the University of Ottawa (which incorporated in 1969). The next three decades were quieter and both newspapers were able to achieve a stability on campus, buoyed by the receipt of a guaranteed student levy voted on in a referendum by U of O students.

The relationship between the university administration and both newspapers gradually became more distant during this time, and (as the publisher of both papers) the SFUO began to step in to moderate and control content when the SFUO felt it was needed. However, the ability of the SFUO to pull any content they deemed questionable quickly lead to dissent on the part of both newspapers and questions of censorship arose. The SFUO stepped in several times during these decades to censor issues that were objectionable or could have been construed as libel, much to the chagrin of editors at both papers. Fueled by their lack of control over their publication and an increasing move towards autonomy in student newspapers across the country, editors at The Fulcrum began formulating plans to go "autonomous" as early as 1998, but many stalled attempts meant that they were not successful until many years later.

It was during this time that The Fulcrum moved to offices located between University of Ottawa's Thompson Residence and Morriset Library (later occupied by CHUO-FM, and now known as the Déjà Vu lounge). In 1989, The Fulcrum was relocated to the basement of 631 King Edward Ave. across from the main campus in a University of Ottawa building.

== In the 21st century ==
In 1999, after several years of a rocky relationship with the Ottawa Gaming Club (who occupied the first floor of 631 King Edward Ave.) The Fulcrum was granted the first and second floor of the building as their new offices. It was also in 1999 that "The Fulcrum" began to make more use of digital technology, switching from more traditional layout techniques to computer layout, and switching over to digital photography, beginning with digital contributions by Steven Meece.

Beginning in the 2003–2004 school year, the paper began referring to itself as University of Ottawa's Fulcrum, rather than The Fulcrum, on the cover.

In the summer of 2004, recently elected editor-in-chief Mary Cummins and managing editor Marcus McCann once again looked into plans to become an autonomously incorporated organization. This push was spurred on by the SFUO attempting to pull the Summer 2004 issue of the Fulcrum for featuring a mug of beer and using the term "Frosh" (the SFUO had recently stopped using the term frosh in favour of welcome week and later 101 week due to negative connotations associated with the term). Aside from this, the separation was due to several reasons. The main reason being that the editorial board felt it was an inherent conflict of interest to be owned by the student government while attempting to write fair, unbiased, and often critical stories about them. The secondary reason was that as an autonomous corporation, the Fulcrum was able to directly control its own finances and spur further growth of the paper.

After discussing the situation with then-president of the SFUO Philippe Laliberté, plans were made to begin the process. In October 2004, a letters patent was granted to "The Fulcrum Publishing Society", the corporation that would take over the governance of the Fulcrum, and negotiations between the SFUO and the Fulcrum continued throughout the year. After approval by the SFUO's Board of Administration, ownership of the Fulcrum officially transferred to The Fulcrum Publishing Society on June 1, 2005.

The Fulcrum Publishing society was set up to be governed by a ten-member board of directors made up of students, community members, Fulcrum staff, U of O faculty, and Fulcrum alumni. Ultimate responsibility for the governance and management of the corporation was left with the board while the president, who acted as the business manager, made decisions on a day-to-day basis. To avoid a similar conflict of interest, provisions were put into the corporate bylaws prohibiting the board from interfering in editorial content unless faced with possible legal action.

After a turbulent first year, the Fulcrum settled into a financially stable position as an autonomous corporation.

Recent changes to the governance structures of the Corporation have led to slight changes, such as the Business (now General) Manager no longer being permitted to hold a seat on the Board, and the roles of the corporation's executives being clarified.

In 2014–15, the newspaper received a complete visual redesign including a new layout and logo.

=== National defence ad boycott ===
On March 19, 2008, the Fulcrum held its Annual General Meeting, normally a fairly subdued event. However, the 2008 AGM saw a group of students mobilize to try to create an ad boycott for the purpose of stopping recruitment ads for the Canadian Forces being run by the Department of National Defence, which those students found objectionable. The meeting was contentious, and the first vote, which came out against the boycott 73–69, was challenged and retaken. On the second vote, it passed by a vote of 93–85, binding the Fulcrum to cease accepting ads from the Department of National Defence as of May 1, 2008. Most of the Fulcrum's editorial board and staff members were against the boycott.

On February 6, 2009, the Fulcrum held its Annual General Meeting and the topic of boycott lists emerged again. A motion was presented to remove the advertising boycott list and it was passed unanimously by a vote of 38–0.

=== Transition to online ===
The Fulcrum transitioned to an online only news source for the 2019/2020 publication year. This completed the transition which saw the paper only publish one print paper a month for the 2018/2019 publication year.

=== University of Ottawa's 2020 debate on academic freedom ===
On October 2, 2020, the Fulcrum published an article detailing the use of a racial slur by a University of Ottawa professor in an online classroom. The article and student outrage on social media led to the university temporarily suspending the professor sparking a nationwide debate on academic freedom at Canadian universities.

== Editorial board ==
Year	Editor-in-chief	Production manager	Managing editor	News editor	Arts & culture editor	Sports editor	Features editor	Visual editor/art director	Social media manager	Opinions editor	Science & tech editor	Videographer
2024-2025	Andrew Wilimek & Kavi Vidya Achar		Sydney Grenier	Bridget Coady	Daniel Jones	Liam Corbett & Ana Sofia de la Parra	Amira Benjamin	Kai Holub	Ayai Offor		Basant Chawla	Pavel Nangfack
2023-2024	Bridget Coady	Matthew McConkey	Amira Benjamin	Kavi Vidya Achar, Shailee Shah	Sydney Grenier	Andrew Wilimek	N/A	Sanjida Rashid, Kai Holub	Ayai Offor	Keith de Silvia-Legault	Emma Williams	Pavel Nangfack
2022-2023	Jasmine McKnight & Hailey Otten											
2021-2022	Charley Dutil		Aisling Murphy	Bridget Coady & Zoë Mason	Zofka Svec/Desiree Nikfardjam	Jasmine McKnight	Amira Benjamin	Hailey Otten	Jelena Maric	Sanjida Rashid	Emma Williams	
2020-2021	Charley Dutil		Emily Wilson	Karli Zschogner/Bridget Coady and Paige Holland	Aisling Murphy	Jasmine McKnight	Amira Benjamin	Dasser Kamran	Leyla Abdolell	Jasmine McKnight	Ryan Matte/Hannah Sabourin	
2019-2020	Matt Gergyek			Meagan Casalino/Aaron Hemens	Ryan Pepper	Charley Dutil	Zoë Mason	Rame Abdulkader	Safa Saud			
2018-2019	Anchal Sharma	Jaclyn McRae-Sadik/Adam Gibbard	Savannah Awde	Marissa Phul/Eric Davison and Sarah Crookall	Iain Sellers	Andrew Price	Matt Gergyek	Rame Abdulkader	Christine Wang	Hanna Methot		
2017-2018	Eric Davidson	Jaclyn McRae-Sadik	Graham Robertson	Zainab Al-Mehdar/Anchal Sharma	Ryan Pepper	Nico Laliberté/Daniel Birru	Savannah Awde	Christine Wang	Dmitri Bakker/Anchal Sharma and Ryan Pepper	David Campion-Smith		
2016-2017	Savannah Awde	Kim Wiens	Kyle Darbyson	Graham Robertson	Anchal Sharma	Spencer Murdock/Nico Laliberté	Alexa-Eliza Carter/ Nadia Drissi El-Bouzaidi	Jaclyn McRae-Sadik	Allegra Morgado/ David Campion-Smith	Eric Davidson		
2015-2016	Nadia Drissi El-Bouzaidi	Devin Orsini	Savannah Awde	Eric Davidson	Allegra Morgado	Spencer Murdock	Kyle Darbyson	Kim Wiens	Reine Tejares	David Campion-Smith		
2014-2015	Sabrina Nemis	Adam Gibbard	Adam Feibel	Nadia Drissi El-Bouzaidi	Jessica Eritou	Sarah Nolette	Jesse Colautti	Marta Kierkus	Spencer Van Dyk	Kyle Darbyson		
2013-2014	Adam Feibel	Rebecca Potter	Rachel Lessard	Spencer Van Dyk	Sabrina Nemis	Marc Jan/Sarah Nolette	Victoria Dudys	Tina Wallace	KayCie Gravelle	Jesse Colautti		
2012-2013	Kristyn Filip	Kyle Hansford	Julia Fabian	Andrew Ikeman/Adam Feibel/KayCie Gravelle	Adam Feibel	Maclaine Chadwick	Ali Schwabe	Mathias MacPhee	Darren Sharp	Sofia Hashi		
2011–2012	Mercedes Mueller	Michelle Ferguson	Jaclyn Lytle	Jane Lytvynenko	Sofia Hashi	Katherine DeClerq	Kristyn Filip	Mico Mazza	Charlotte Bailey			
2010–2011	Amanda Shendruk	Jessie Willms	Mercedes Mueller	Katherine DeClerq	Charlotte Bailey	Jaehoon Kim	Jaclyn Lytle	Alex Martin	Chelsea Edgell			
2009–2010	Emma Godmere	Amanda Shendruk	David McClelland	Laura Clementson	Jaclyn Lytle	Andrew Hawley	Laurel Hogan	Alex Martin				
2008–2009	Frank Appleyard	Ben Myers	Michael Olender	Emma Godmere	Peter Henderson	David McClelland	Sarah Leavitt	Martha Pearce				
2007–2008	Melanie Wood	Brian Bosma	Travis Boisvenue	Nick Taylor-Vaisey	Tina Hassannia	Ben Myers	Michael Olender	Meaghan Walton				
2006–2007	Drew Gough/Melanie Wood	Peter Raaymakers	Maureen Robinson	Melanie Wood/Nick Taylor-Vaisey	Travis Boisvenue	Nick Taylor-Vaisey/Frank Appleyard	Jessica Morris	Jason Chiu				
2005-2006	Drew Gough											
2004-2005	Mary Cummins											

== Board of directors/general manager/executive director ==
Voting Members	Ex-Officio Members
President: Keelan Buck (Contributor Representative)	Executive Director: Simon Coakeley
Chair: Emma Godmere (Continuity Representative)	Co-Editor-in-Chief: Kavi Vidya Achar
Secretary: Devin Beauregard (Community Representative)	Co-Editor-in-Chief: Andrew Wilimek
Treasurer: Ria Kunkulol (Student Representative)	
Director: Bhanu Bhakta Acharya (University Representative)	
Director: Siena Domaradzki-Kim (Contributor Representative)	
Director: Gabrielle Douglas (Student Representative)	
Director: Nina Oliveira (Student Representative)	
Director: Agape Williams (Student Representative)

=== Presidents ===
- 2023–Present: Keelan Buck
- 2021–2023: Kalki Nagaratnam
- 2019-2021: Justin Turcotte
- 2016-2019: Raghad Sheikh-Khalil
- 2015-2016: Mackenzie Gray
- 2014-2015: Keeton Wilcock
- 2013-2014: Kyle Hansford/Keeton Wilcock
- 2012-2013: Mercedes Mueller
- 2011-2012: Andrew Hawley
- 2010-2011: Scott Bedard
- 2009-2010: Nick Taylor-Vaisey
- 2008-2009: Ross Prusakowski
- 2006-2008: Rob Fishbook
- 2005-2006: Mary Cummins

=== Executive Directors/General Managers ===
- 2023–Present: Simon Coakeley
- 2021–2023: Ludvica Boota
- 2021: Justin Turcotte
- 2020-2021: Dorian Ghosn
- 2020: Rame Abdulkader
- 2018-2020: Dorian Ghosn
- 2016–2018: Lucas Ghosn
- 2015-2016: Dayne Moyer
- 2012-2015: Andrew Hawley
- 2011-2012: Danielle Vicha
- 2010-2011: David McClelland
- 2009-2010: Frank Appleyard
- 2008-2009: Ross Prusakowski
- 2006-2008: Rob Fishbook
- 2005-2006: Mary Cummins

== Notable alumni ==
- Aaron Badgley, music critic and radio host
- Jason Chiu, Visual Editor The New York Times
- Kate Heartfield, author, former editorial pages editor for the Ottawa Citizen and professor of journalism at Carleton University
- André Picard, Quebec Bureau Chief and health columnist for The Globe and Mail
- Douglas Roche, OC, former Chairman of the United Nations Disarmament Committee, Senator and Member of Parliament

== See also ==
- List of student newspapers in Canada
- List of newspapers in Canada
