= Janet E. Minor =

Canadian barrister

65th Treasurer of the Law Society of Upper Canada
- In office 2014–2016
- Preceded by: Thomas G. Conway
- Succeeded by: Paul Schabas

Janet E. Minor is a Canadian barrister and a former Treasurer of the Law Society of Upper Canada.

== Early life and education ==
Minor was raised in Wainfleet, Ontario. She has an LLB from the University of Toronto and an LLM from Osgoode Hall Law School.

== Legal career ==
She was called to the Bar of Ontario in 1975.

Minor was elected by Convocation to lead The Law Society of Upper Canada as its 65th Treasurer in June 2014.

Minor has worked in public law since 1977. Up until her election, she was general counsel in the Constitutional Law Branch of Ontario’s Ministry of the Attorney General. She has appeared before all levels of Court and has argued many significant cases on behalf of the Ontario government. She was first elected as a bencher of the Law Society of Upper Canada in 2001 and was re-elected in 2006 and 2011. She has served on a number of committees including chair of the Professional Development and Competence Committee and the Equity and Aboriginal Issues Committee, as well as a member of the Access to Justice Committee and the Retention of Women and Challenges Faced by Racialized Licensees working groups.

Most recently, Minor played an integral role in the introduction of Pathways, an innovative project undertaken to address the shortage of articling placements, involving significant changes to the experiential training component of the Lawyer Licensing Process.

Minor is a founding director of the Association of Law Officers of the Crown (ALOC) and past director of The Advocates’ Society. She has also served on the boards of the Law Foundation of Ontario and the Ontario Justice Education Network.

== Awards and honours ==
She received the Women’s Law Association President’s Award (2003), the Ontario Bar Association’s Tom Marshall Award (2010), the ALOC Carol Creighton Award for Contribution to Public Law (2013), and a Zenith Award celebrating leading women lawyers from Lexpert (2013).

== See also ==
- List of treasurers of the Law Society of Upper Canada
