= La Rotonde =

Student newspaper at the University of Ottawa

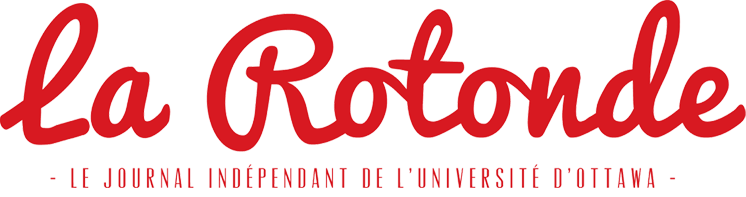
- Type: Weekly student newspaper
- Format: Tabloid
- President: Jean-Philippe Dubé
- Editor-in-chief: Mathieu Tovar-Poitras
- General manager: Ghassen Athmni
- Founded: 1932
- Language: French
- Headquarters: 109 Osgoode Street; Ottawa, Ontario; K1N 6S1
- Country: Canada
- Circulation: 2,000 (per issue)
- Website: larotonde.ca

La Rotonde is the official French-language student newspaper at the University of Ottawa. It is the oldest French-language student paper outside of Quebec.

The newspaper publishes weekly throughout the fall and winter sessions on regular topics including news, arts and culture, sports, and travel. Previously owned by the Student Federation of the University of Ottawa, La Rotonde achieved an independent status on May 1, 2008. A not-for-profit corporation, Les Publications La Rotonde Inc., has been created to manage the newspaper. Its directors are elected by University of Ottawa students during an annual general meeting.

While The Fulcrum is the official English-language student newspaper, the two publications are not repetitions of each other and offer unique, and sometimes conflicting, content and opinions.

== History ==
La Rotonde was founded in 1932 by the Société de Débats Français.

In the 50s, the paper became increasingly autonomous and challenging of the political order, leading to several conflicts with the university administration. In 1956, La Rotonde was named the most censored newspaper in Canada by the Canadian University Press. In 1958, 3 editors were expelled for writing an article that the administration disliked. Later that year, the paper was shut down, not resuming operations until 1959.

In 1965, student newspaper ownership was transferred to the SFUO. 4 years later, the union merged La Rotonde and the Fulcrum to create a bilingual paper called Id. Id was unsuccessful however, and La Rotonde began publishing again in 1970.

In 1986, the paper was almost shut down after serious financial difficulties.

In 1999, the SFUO banned journalists from either of the student papers from entering the SFUO offices, stating a danger of journalists overhearing potentially sensitive information.

In January 2002, the SFUO executive censored the publication of the 15th of January issue of La Rotonde. In that issue, the paper was to publish an editorial responding to accusations made by the SFUO's Pride Centre Coordinator. The SFUO's publishing committee then overturned the executive's decision. This was then appealed to the Student Arbitration Committee, who also ruled in favour of overturning the executive's decision. However, the SFUO's Board of Administration voted to uphold the executive's decision. The BoA, however, debated the issue in-camera, and refused to allow La Rotonde's editor-in-chief access to the debate to defend the paper, while allowing the Pride Centre coordinator access to the debate to defend her case against the paper. The Fulcrum commented on the affair, criticising the SFUO, saying that "it is sometimes hard to be proud of an institution as politically dysfunctional as the SFUO. The SFUO executive's blasé attitude towards the constitution, the undermining of the student arbitration process and its casual manner of dismissing its critics is uninspiring. Often the SFUO resembles less a democratic student government than a gang of school children running around at recess, who simply make up the rules to their games as they go along."

In 2006, when the paper was still under the control of the SFUO, the editorial board decided to change the way it hired its General Manager. Previously, the General Manager was just chosen by the editorial board, but under the new system, the other staff of the paper would be given a lot more say. However, the SFUO then refused to accept the hiring of Wassim Garzouzi, on the grounds that the SFUO wanted more control over the papers' finances and that the SFUO disapproved of the new hiring system. In reaction to the SFUO's interference, the editorial board wrote a letter demanding more autonomy and collected over 800 signatures for a petition and the News Editor resigned. However, the SFUO's BoA refused to let Garzouzi assume his position. Earlier that year, the SFUO was involved in another scandal involving the paper after the SFUO was threatened with a lawsuit following an article the paper had printed. This later led to the SFUO's lawyers telling the SFUO BoA to monitor the paper and to not "support the status quo of allowing [La Rotonde] to print whatever they want."

In 2013, 80% of the copies of La Rotonde's post-election issue were stolen.

In October 2016, La Rotonde published an investigative piece into Vet's Tour, a highly sexual pub crawl organised by the Science Students' Association. The investigation revealed that the very secretive event promoted rape culture and abuse of alcohol, with a slogan of "It's not peer pressure, it's just your turn". After publication of the article, the paper's news editor was subject to violent and racist threats.

In March 2017, several members of the SFUO executive were investigated for having allegedly stolen UPasses, a scandal which was brought to light by La Rotonde. Those members of the SFUO executive attacked the paper for its coverage of the scandal, calling it "biased", "fake news" and said the staff of the paper should work for Donald Trump. A few days later, those members of the SFUO executive and one incoming member of the SFUO exec stormed La Rotonde's 2017 AGM with a group of other students and attempted to obtain seats on the paper's board of directors in what appeared to be an attempt to take control of the paper. However they failed to obtain seats on Board of Directors because the paper's constitution forbids SFUO employees from being directors of La Rotonde.

== Editorial positions ==
La Rotonde endorsed the creation of General Assemblies.

== Notable alumni ==
- Patrick Lagacé
- Jason Chiu, Visual Editor for The New York Times

== See also ==
- List of student newspapers in Canada
- List of newspapers in Canada
