= Laura Legge =

Canadian lawyer (1923–2010)

Laura Legge, OOnt, QC

Treasurer of the Law Society of Upper Canada
- In office 1983–1986
- Preceded by: Brendan O'Brien
- Succeeded by: Pierre Genest
- In office 1988–1988
- Preceded by: William Daniel Chilcott
- Succeeded by: Lee Kenneth Ferrier

Laura Legge, OOnt, QC (January 27, 1923 –October 5, 2010) was a recipient of the Order of Ontario in 2003.

Legge graduated from Osgoode Hall Law School in 1948 after earning a B.A. and a nursing degree. Legge received an honorary LLD from the Law Society of Upper Canada in 1988.

In 1955, she and her husband established the still active law firm of Legge & Legge.

Legge was elected the Law Society of Upper Canada's first female bencher in 1975. Legge was twice elected treasurer of the Law Society of Upper Canada. She was the organization's first female head. Since 2007, the Law Society of Upper Canada has selected a recipient of the Laura Legge award to recognize women in Ontario who have exemplified leadership in the legal profession.

== See also ==
- List of treasurers of the Law Society of Upper Canada
