= Allan Rock =

Canadian politician

The Honourable Allan Rock PC CM OOnt KC
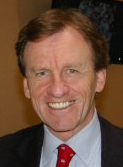

Canadian Ambassador to the United Nations
- In office 2004–2006
- Preceded by: Paul Heinbecker
- Succeeded by: John McNee

Member of Parliament for Etobicoke Centre
- In office 1993–2004
- Preceded by: Michael Wilson
- Succeeded by: Borys Wrzesnewskyj

Minister of Justice
- In office November 4, 1993 – June 10, 1997
- Prime Minister: Jean Chrétien
- Preceded by: Pierre Blais
- Succeeded by: Anne McLellan

Minister of Health
- In office June 11, 1997 – January 14, 2002
- Prime Minister: Jean Chrétien
- Preceded by: David Dingwall
- Succeeded by: Anne McLellan

52nd Treasurer of the Law Society of Upper Canada
- In office 1992–1993
- Preceded by: James MacDonald Spence
- Succeeded by: Paul Stephen Andrew Lamek

Personal details
- Born: Allan Michael Rock; August 30, 1947 (age 79) Ottawa, Ontario, Canada
- Party: Liberal
- Spouse: Deborah Hanscom
- Profession: Lawyer, politician, government minister, school administrator

Allan Michael Rock PC CM OOnt KC (born August 30, 1947) is a Canadian lawyer, former politician, diplomat and university administrator. He was Canada's ambassador to the United Nations (2003-2006) and had previously served in the Cabinet of Jean Chrétien, most notably as Justice Minister (1993–1997), Health Minister (1997–2002) and Minister of Industry and Infrastructure (2002-03).

Rock was appointed as President and Vice-Chancellor of the University of Ottawa by its Board of Governors on June 3, 2008. His term began on July 15, 2008, and it ended on July 1, 2016. Rock was subsequently designated president emeritus. His presidency was marked by steady growth in uOttawa's reputation as a research-intensive university with a strong Canadian and international profile. There were minor controversies over freedom of speech during his term.

Rock joined the University of Ottawa Faculty of Law in 2018, where he is served as a full professor specializing in subjects related to international law (notably international humanitarian law). He also taught Public and Constitutional Law. He retired from teaching in 2023.

Rock is a member of the World Refugee and Migration Council and is chair of the Board of Directors of Security Council Report.

== Early life ==
Allan Rock was born to James Thomas Rock and Anne (née Torley) Rock in Ottawa, where he was raised and educated through secondary school. He received a B.A. in 1968 and an LL.B. in 1971 at the University of Ottawa, and he began a 20-year career as a trial lawyer where he specialized in civil, commercial, and administrative litigation. He practised with the Toronto firm then called Fasken and Calvin, later the international firm Fasken.

Rock served as president of the Student Federation of the University of Ottawa (SFUO) for the 1969-70 year. He had previously served on the executive of the Arts students association and briefly as SFUO External Commissioner.

In June 1969, Rock met John Lennon during the Lennon's "bed-in" in Montreal; Lennon accepted Rock's invitation to attend a "peace conference” in Ottawa. Following the conference in Ottawa, Rock drove Lennon and wife Yoko Ono around the city in Rock's modest Volkswagen. At Lennon's request, they went to Prime Minister Pierre Trudeau’s official residence at 24 Sussex Drive; however, Trudeau was not home, so Lennon wrote a note on the spot and left it at the door. Six months later, Lennon returned to Ottawa and finally met Trudeau.

On graduation from law school, Rock joined Fasken & Calvin, a noted Bay Street law firm in Toronto, where he worked in the litigation department with Walter Williston, Ron Rolls, and Bill Graham. He rose to become partner. Rock and Rolls co-taught the civil procedure section of the Bar Admission course (bringing a smile to many young lawyers' faces). Rock was appointed Queen's Counsel in 1985.

Rock served 10 years as a Bencher (governor) of Ontario's Law Society, being elected by members of the profession in the elections of 1983, 1987 and 1991. He was acclaimed by his peers as the 52nd Treasurer of the Law Society of Upper Canada, serving from 1992 until 1993.

== Ministerial career ==
In 1993, he was elected as the Member of Parliament for Etobicoke Centre and named Minister of Justice and Attorney General of Canada. In that capacity, he introduced significant changes to the Criminal Code, including major changes to the sentencing provisions that included "conditional sentences" and special provisions when sentencing indigenous offenders. His initiatives also included major gun safety legislation. He also amended the Canadian Human Rights Act, to prohibit discrimination in the federal workforce based on sexual orientation. He became Minister of Health in 1997, where he facilitated the creation of the Canadian Institutes of Health Research (CIHR) and more than doubled annual health research funding on a national scale.

Subsequently, as Minister of Industry and the Minister responsible for Infrastructure Canada, he introduced Canada's innovation strategy, was responsible for Canada's three granting councils (the CIHR, Natural Sciences and Engineering Research Council (NSERC), and the Social Sciences and Humanities Research Council (SSHRC)), and introduced legislation to create the Pierre Elliott Trudeau Foundation to promote applied research in the social sciences and the humanities.

Rock initially declared he would run in the Liberal Party of Canada leadership race to replace the retiring Jean Chrétien. However, he was unable to overcome Paul Martin's commanding lead. In 2003, Rock dropped out of the leadership race and announced his support for Martin. When Prime Minister Paul Martin was departing as leader of the Liberal Party of Canada, Rock was mentioned as a potential candidate to replace him, but on February 3, 2006, Rock announced that he would not run for leadership of the Liberal Party. He later endorsed Stéphane Dion's successful bid to lead the party.

== Ambassador to United Nations ==
On December 12, 2003, Queen Elizabeth II, on the advice of Paul Martin, appointed Rock as Canada's ambassador to the United Nations. Rock thereupon resigned his seat in the House of Commons. As Canada's ambassador to the UN, Rock spoke to the UN General Assembly on April 13, 2004, encouraging participation of the member nations of the United Nations on the matter of the Kimberley Process Certification Scheme.

As the voice of Canadians at the United Nations, Rock was an outspoken advocate of human rights, human security, and reforming the UN. At the 2005 World Summit at the UN, Rock led the successful Canadian effort to secure the adoption by world leaders of the doctrine "Responsibility to Protect" that maintains that the United Nations is mandated to protect populations from genocide, ethnic cleansing, war crimes, and crimes against humanity when national governments fail to extend such protection or are themselves engaged in such crimes against their own people. Other roles at the UN included chairing a working group on obstacles to long-term development in Haiti, efforts to end the conflict in Northern Uganda and peace negotiations in Abuja, Nigeria involving the Government of Sudan and representatives of the three main rebel groups seeking greater autonomy for Darfur.

Rock tendered his resignation in February 2006, and on February 16, the newly elected Conservative Prime Minister Stephen Harper announced the appointment of Rock's replacement, John McNee. Rock remained in office until June 30, 2006 at Harper's request. Upon his departure, he called for an overhaul of the UN. Rock was later appointed as a UN Special Envoy to investigate allegations that child soldiers were being forced to fight in the Sri Lankan civil war. Rock submitted his report about child soldiers in Sri Lanka on January 15, 2007 to the Security Council of the UN.

== After public life ==
Rock announced earlier in June 2006 that he would be moving to Windsor, Ontario, to resume his legal career with Harvey Thomas Strosberg at Sutts, Strosberg LLP. Rock continued to publish op-eds around international issues, including the conduct of UN peacekeepers, the Syrian refugee crisis, and the G20.

== University of Ottawa President ==
It was announced in May 2008 that Rock would be appointed as the next president of the University of Ottawa. Rock was an alumnus of the university and had graduated in 1970 with a law degree.

In 1969, during his time as a student at the University of Ottawa, Rock was President of the SFUO (the Student Federation of the University of Ottawa), then the undergraduate student union for the University of Ottawa Following the announcement of Rock's appointment as President of the University of Ottawa, The Ottawa Citizen wrote:

At a time when the university, like other Canadian campuses, is experiencing a resurgence in student activism, Mr. Rock would bring a sensitivity to student issues, said Mr. Mitchell. "This is something that Allan Rock is particularly qualified for, being a former student leader himself."

In two separate incidents during Rock's tenure, members of the University of Ottawa hockey team were accused of sexual misconduct. Rock called the scandals "repugnant", suspended the entire team, and set up a Task Force on Respect and Equality. Ten months later, the task force released a report making 11 recommendations, which Rock promised to implement, saying "that his school will become a 'beacon' dedicated to eradicating issues of sexual violence."

His term ended on July 1, 2016, and Rock was succeeded by Jacques Frémont.

=== Controversies ===
==== Censorship ====
On February 26, 2009, the Canadian Civil Liberties Association wrote to Rock to express its concern over his administration's banning of a student poster and to ask that he redress the situation with a public declaration.

==== Ann Coulter ====
Amid much media attention, right-wing commentator and author Ann Coulter was scheduled to give a talk at the University of Ottawa on March 23, 2010. The talk was cancelled following student protests at the talk venue. The organizers of the event blamed the university and the protesters. Rock in turn responded in a university press release suggesting that the organizers may have needlessly cancelled the talk. At the centre of the controversy was a letter sent to Coulter before her scheduled talk in Ottawa, signed by the Vice President (Academic), which warned that Coulter could be arrested for hate speech. The letter was condemned as a violation of academic freedom by the Canadian Association of University Teachers and was widely criticized in the media. Three weeks after the cancelled event, Rock publicly stated having pre-approved the letter as the institution's official response.

During his time in government, Rock was accused of ethical improprieties after accepting free hospitality from the Irving family, although at the time he was Minister of Health which had no dealings with that family. No wrongdoing was ever established. However, Rock chose to apologize for his lapse in judgment.

== Honours ==
In 2017, Rock was made a member of Order of Ontario.

in 2020, Rock was made a member of the Order of Canada Order of Canada

== Electoral record ==
1997 Canadian federal election: Etobicoke Centre
Party	Candidate	Votes	%	±%
Liberal	Allan Rock	27,345	54.6	+0.2
Progressive Conservative	Alida Leistra	11,023	22.0	+2.5
Reform	Jason Beyak	8,638	17.2	-4.9
New Democratic	Matthew Bonk	2,661	5.3	+3.1
Natural Law	Paul Gasztold	267	0.5	+0.1
Marxist–Leninist	Janice Murray	189	0.4	+0.3
Total valid votes		50,123	100.0	

1993 Canadian federal election: Etobicoke Centre
Party	Candidate	Votes	%	±%
Liberal	Allan Rock	25,633	54.3	+13.9
Reform	Charles McLeod	10,440	22.1	
Progressive Conservative	Charles Donley	9,203	19.5	-28.9
New Democratic	Udayan Rege	1,037	2.2	-7.4
National	Janice Tait	500	1.1	
Natural Law	Everett Murphy	200	0.4	
Abolitionist	Kelly Ann Leblanc	77	0.2	
Marxist–Leninist	Janice Murray	53	0.1	
Commonwealth of Canada	Joseph Zmak	25	0.1	-0.1
Total valid votes		47,168	100.0	

26th Canadian Ministry (1993–2003) – Cabinet of Jean Chrétien
Cabinet posts (5)
Predecessor	Office	Successor
Brian Tobin	Minister of Industry; 2002–2003	Lucienne Robillard
Brian Tobin	Minister for the Atlantic Canada Opportunities Agency; 2002–2003	Joe McGuire
Brian Tobin	Minister of Western Economic Diversification; 2002–2003	Rey Pagtakhan
David Dingwall	Minister of Health; 1997–2002	Anne McLellan
Pierre Blais	Minister of Justice; 1993–1997	Anne McLellan
Special Cabinet Responsibilities
Predecessor	Title	Successor
vacant, previously Marcel Massé	Minister responsible for Infrastructure; 2002–2003	position abolished
