= Thomas G. Conway =

64th Treasurer of the Law Society of Upper Canada
- In office 2012–2014
- Preceded by: Laurie Pawlitza
- Succeeded by: Janet E. Minor
- Website: http://conway.pro/thomas-g-conway/

Thomas G. Conway is a former Treasurer of the Law Society of Upper Canada.

== Education ==
- LL.B. University of Ottawa 1987
- M.A. (History) University of Calgary 1984
- B.A. (History) University of Calgary 1984
- B.A. (English) University of Calgary 1982

== Legal career ==
Conway articled until he was called to the bar in 1989 and practiced at Soloway Wright LLP from 1987 to 1994. From 1994 to 2009, he was a litigation partner at McCarthy Tetrault LLP, where he was the head of the Ottawa Litigation Group for several years. In 2009, he joined Cavanagh Williams Conway Baxter, until founding Conway Baxter Wilson LLP in 2014.

Conway was first elected a bencher of The Law Society of Upper Canada in 2007, he became the 64th Treasurer of the Law Society of Upper Canada in 2012, serving two terms until 2014.

From November 2014 to November 2015, Conway was the president of the Federation of Law Society of Canada, the umbrella organization of all of the 14 law societies of Canada. In 2019, the Minister of Innovation, Science and Economic Development Canada appointed him as the first chair, Board of Directors, College of Patent Agents and Trademark Agents.

In June 2021, Conway was retained to represent Maj Gen Dany Fortin in a judicial review application to the Federal Court of Canada, challenging the decision of government Ministers to remove him role as the head of Canada's procurement and distribution of COVID-19 vaccines.

== Awards and honours ==
In 2017, the Law Society of Ontario granted Conway the degree of Doctor of Laws (Hon. Causa) for his contribution to the legal professions and the cause of improving access to justice. Conway was recognized in 2007 by the National Post as one of Canada's top corporate and commercial litigation lawyers. In 2013, Canadian Law Magazine recognized him as one of Canada's 25 most influential lawyers. He has been recognized annually by Lexpert and Best Lawyers in Canada as a leading practitioner in corporate, commercial and products liability law.

== Academic career ==
From 2004 to 2009, Conway was an adjunct professor of law the University of Ottawa, where he taught trial advocacy.
