= Student Federation of the University of Ottawa =

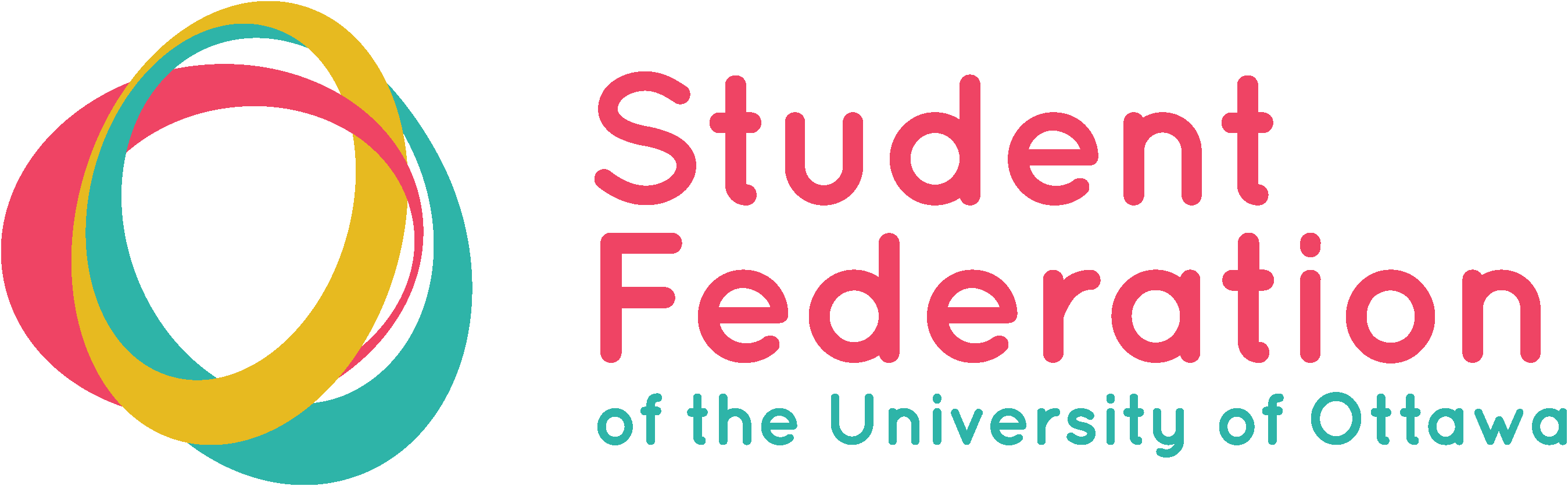
- Institution: University of Ottawa
- Location: Ottawa, Ontario
- Established: 1969
- Abolished: December 24th, 2018 (de jure); April 10, 2019 (de facto)
- President: Rizki Rachiq (Note: At time of dissolution.)
- Members: 36,000 (2018)
- Affiliations: CFS
- Website: www.sfuo.ca

The Student Federation of the University of Ottawa (SFUO) (French: Fédération étudiante de l'Université d'Ottawa; FÉUO) was the students' union representing undergraduate students of the University of Ottawa from 1969 to 2018. It was a not-for-profit organization incorporated under the Corporations Act of Ontario.

On August 9, 2018, La Rotonde, the university's French-language newspaper, reported that the Ottawa Police Service was investigating members of the SFUO and its executive for fraud. On September 25, 2018, the University of Ottawa provided the Federation with a 90-day notice of termination of their contract, citing insufficient progress and further allegations of workplace misconduct, internal conflict, and improper governance. The notice expired on December 24, 2018. A referendum was held in February 2019 to determine whether the SFUO would be reinstated as the official undergraduate student union or whether a new organization, the University of Ottawa Students' Union (UOSU), would take its place. On February 11, 2019, the University of Ottawa announced that the University of Ottawa Students' Union had won the referendum to become the official undergraduate student union. As a result, the SFUO offices closed on April 10, 2019.

== History ==
SFUO President Jock Turcot was killed in a car accident in 1965. The University Centre, finished in 1973, was named after him.

=== 2010s ===
In February 2010, President Seamus Wolfe was arrested and charged with causing a disturbance. Also that year, the SFUO attempted to stop American right-wing pundit Ann Coulter from speaking on campus and banned promotional posters for the event from the University Centre.

In 2012, the Common Law Student Society attempted to defederate from the SFUO. Although the referendum was successful, it was rejected by the Board of Administration (BoA) as illegitimate. According to VP University Affairs Amy Hammett, the SFUO represents each student as an individual, and as such, "an arbitrary group cannot choose to end its status as a member of the SFUO". Around the same time, there was several defederation movements by federated bodies, although none were successful.

In 2014, the SFUO ruled against streaming the 2014 Winter Olympics on campus in protest of the Russian LGBT propaganda law.

=== UPass ===
In 2010, the SFUO introduced the UPass (a public transportation pass for the Ottawa-Gatineau area) for full-time students, after about 64% of students voted in favour in a referendum. Students were required to buy a pass as part of their membership of the SFUO, if they were eligible as a full-time undergraduate or graduate student. In 2011, nine students sued the SFUO, claiming that making the UPass mandatory was unconstitutional. Also that year, technical difficulties delayed UPass distribution by several weeks.

In 2012, another referendum to keep the UPass was successful. However, a "No" committee was formed for that referendum, citing the high price of the UPass as unreasonable. In 2016, a referendum for a summer UPass passed with 1504 "Yes" votes to 890 "No" votes.

In early 2017 allegations were made that some SFUO executives had obtained and were using U-Passes, even though, as part-time students, they could not qualify for the scheme. An investigation by the BoA Disciplinary Committee found that VP social Hadi Wess, VP university affairs Vanessa Dorimain, and VP equity Morissa Ellis had obtained U-Passes, but the committee did not recommend sanctions against those involved.

=== Tuition fee protests ===
In 2012, the SFUO barricaded the University administration offices in protest over tuition fees.

In September 2014, a group of students, led by several members of the SFUO executive, crashed the opening of the Advanced Research Complex to protest tuition fees. The group stood behind the podium with a banner calling for lower tuition fees, and the VP University Affairs interrupted a speech by Reza Moridi to read a statement. The protest drew criticism from many students, including several executive members of the Science Students' Association, who wrote a letter to the Fulcrum stating that: "The fact that the 'student representative' felt it necessary to protest rising tuition fees on the opening of (Dr. André Lalonde's) building is offensive to many of us. We feel that it is not only disrespectful to his memory and his legacy as a student-oriented dean, but also because this building should be celebrated for what it is, instead of criticised for what it is not."

=== Fraud allegations and closure ===
On August 9, 2018, La Rotonde, the university's French-language newspaper, reported that the Ottawa Police Service was investigating members of the SFUO and its executive for fraud. A police report filed by outgoing SFUO president, Hadi Wess, was circulated online, outlining the discovery of purchases carried out by the president and the executive manager.

On August 10, the university notified the SFUO that it was withholding the union's funding and taking over the management of student levies until a forensic audit into the allegations could be completed. Measures were put in place to ensure the continuity of financial operations until the results of the audit become available.

The university subsequently learned of additional allegations of improper governance, mismanagement, internal conflict and workplace misconduct within the SFUO. University representatives expressed their concerns about these allegations in correspondence and two meetings with the SFUO executive, and on September 25, 2018, presented the Federation with a 90-day notice of termination of their contract, citing insufficient progress on dealing with the allegations. The announcement noted that, as of December 24, 2018, the Federation would no longer be recognized as the official representative of students, and students wishing to establish successor organizations would be invited to come forward.

On November 7, 2018, the SFUO released the completed audit from PwC. On November 8, 2018, the University of Ottawa responded via an email to students that the report had "not restored the university's confidence in the SFUO's ability to practice sound financial management", and reiterated their intention to terminate the University of Ottawa-SFUO agreement.

A referendum was held in February 2019 to determine whether the SFUO would be reinstated as the official undergraduate student union or whether a new organization - the University of Ottawa Students' Union (UOSU) would take its place. On February 11, 2019, the University of Ottawa announced that the University of Ottawa Students' Union had won the referendum to become the official undergraduate student union.

The SFUO offices closed on April 10, 2019. An equitable court receiver was appointed to dissolve the federation officially.

== Past presidents ==
Past presidents of the organization have included Marcel Prud'homme (1958–59), André Ouellet (1959–60), Allan Rock (1969–70), Hugh Segal (1970–71), Denis Paradis (1974–75), Mauril Bélanger (1977–79), Anne McGrath (1979–80), Bernard Drainville (1984–85), Gilles Marchildon (1987–88), Maxime Pedneaud-Jobin (1990–91) and Guy Caron (1992–94).

== Finances ==
According to auditors Deloitte, the Student Federation collected $5,103,066 from all 36,068 registered students during the 2015 session.

In February 2017, the SFUO began discussions about raising executive salaries from $33,500 to $39,700, an increase of 18%, despite the poor financial condition and bankruptcy of the student union in 2016. Students criticized continual lack of funding to clubs, the low wages of other SFUO employees, and accused SFUO executives of conflict of interest. Despite widespread online criticism, the proposal was passed, with SFUO executives citing the higher salaries of other university student federation executives and dependent children as reasons for the raise. On March 14, the Winter 2017 general assembly met quorum for the first time since 1980, with over 280 students attending to repeal the executives' pay raise.

In April 2017, the executive salary was raised by $2,000 to $35,500, plus the cost of up to two courses per semester as well as cell phone costs.

== Student-run businesses ==
At the time of its dissolution, the SFUO owned four student-run businesses:

- PIVIK, a convenience store located in the University Centre. The UOSU subsequently inherited the business after the organization's dissolution.
- The Agora Bookstore, opened in 1999 with the goal of providing cheaper textbooks. In 2006, students voted in a referendum to maintain a levy $9 per full-time student per semester to subsidize the Agora. The Agora was located on Besserer Street, as it was not allowed to sell textbooks on campus.
- 1848, a student bar in the University Centre, opened in 2006. From 1984 to 2002, the SFUO owned and operated a fore-runner to 1848 called "The Equinox", later shortened to "The Nox", which closed after losing around $500,000 in its final five years of operation.
- Café Alt, located in the basement of Simard Hall, opened in October 2008 as a green and fair-trade student café.

== Clubs ==
The SFUO was home to over 250 cultural, religious, political/social justice, philanthropic/humanitarian, recreational and academic clubs on campus. The SFUO had subsidised clubs up to $1000 each year. This was increased to $2000 during the 2015-16 school year. During the 2016–17 school year, clubs had their funding cut entirely due to the SFUO's austerity measures. To receive benefits, each club was required to register at the beginning of each academic year to be recognized as a SFUO club.

== Governance ==
=== Board of Administration ===
The highest governing body of the SFUO was the Board of Administration (BoA). The BoA comprised 34 members: six executive members, 25 faculty representatives, one special student representative, one international student representative, and one Indigenous student representative. All the executive and faculty representative positions were directly elected. The BoA met once a month.

=== General Assemblies ===
The second-highest governing body of the SFUO was the General Assembly (GA), which was open to all students. The GA's quorum was set at 0.75% of the student population, about 240 students. General Assemblies had existed since the incorporation of the SFUO in 1969, yet were only used as emergency measures, and fell out of use in the 1990s.

In November 2013, the Marxist Students' Association organised a petition to implement general assemblies as the highest decision making body of the SFUO, as was the case in several other Quebec student unions. The proposal was endorsed by La Rotonde. Student opponents of the creation of the GA cited cost concerns, and argued that the GA quorum of 1% would not be adequately representative of the student population. The referendum saw over 80% of students vote for the creation of the GA, but the result was invalid as the minimum quorum of 5% was not reached.

A second referendum was held during the 2014 general elections, after being proposed by President Anne-Marie Roy during the December BoA meeting. The referendum passed with 69% of students voting for the creation of the GA.

The first SFUO General Assembly of the 21st century was held in November 2014. It failed to meet the quorum, and all the motions presented were later approved by the BoA, except for the motion calling for the SFUO to study the possibility of a strike. This motion was tabled indefinitely by the BoA, in the hope that it would presented again at the next GA. Because the GA never met the quorum, it became a Q&A period with the executive.

The second GA, held in March 2015, saw a turnout of just over 100 students. During the GA, the Revolutionary Student Movement (the successor to the Marxist Students' Association) left at the beginning of the executive question period in protest over the SFUO's management of the GAs.

The quorum was only met twice. The first was in 1980 in reaction to a large tuition increase, where a resolution was passed to implement a tuition boycott. The second time was in March 2017, after a motion was brought forward in a January Board of Administration meeting by Will Hume, a fourth-year communications student, which lowered quorum from one percent of the student population (around 350 people) to 0.75 percent (around 240). Hume had gathered the requisite 300 signatures to introduce the motion. A separate motion was passed later in the same meeting to reduce the number of signatures required to 100. At the following March 2017 Winter General Assembly, students voted to repeal an executive pay raise of 18%.

=== Justice Centre for Constitutional Freedoms ===
The SFUO has generally scored badly on the JCCF's annual Campus Freedom Index. In 2012, the SFUO received a D for both policy and practice.

== Canadian Federation of Students ==
Prior to its dissolution, the SFUO was Local 41 of the Canadian Federation of Students, the same local number it held from 1985 to 1994.

SFUO executives started attending CFS meetings in 1982. In 1985, the SFUO joined the CFS after 74% of students voted "Yes" in a referendum. In 1990, 77% of students voted to continue membership of the CFS. Five years later, the SFUO left the CFS in protest against the CFS' ineffectiveness and confrontational stances. 70% of students voted to leave in a referendum. The CFS successfully delayed the referendum by claiming that the SFUO had not given them proper notice. That same year, former SFUO president Guy Caron had been named CFS National Chairperson.

After the SFUO left the CFS, it continued to participate in some CFS campaigns and sent delegates to observe CFS meetings. In 2002, several students attempted to organise another referendum to rejoin the CFS. The BoA considered the decision several times, without deciding to hold a referendum. In 2007, the BoA overturned an attempt by the executive to rejoin the CFS. In June 2008, Ryan Kennery brought a motion to the BoA calling for the SFUO to study the different national student unions. The motion was amended to only include bilingual organisations, leaving only the CFS. A committee composed of 2 executive members and 3 BoA members then recommended rejoining the CFS.

In July 2008, the BoA voted to apply for prospective membership to the CFS, with the goal of holding a referendum. The vote was carried by 25-3, with one abstention.

In November 2008, the SFUO voted to join the Canadian Federation of Students (CFS). Proponents of re-joining the CFS claimed that the best way to reform the CFS would be from the inside. However, the SFUO was subsequently criticised for failing to support CFS reform and the CFS continues to be regarded as ineffective and partisan. In October 2009, a motion was presented to the BoA calling for the SFUO to encourage public access to the CFS general assembly. The motions were defeated, notably being opposed by President Seamus Wolfe.

Anne-Marie Roy, SFUO President from 2013-2015, served as the Francophone Students Representative on the CFS National Executive during the years that she was SFUO President. She was later chosen as CFS National Deputy Chairperson.

== Elections ==
Elections for the SFUO executive and Board of Administration were held annually in February, when all 6 executive positions and 25 faculty representative positions were elected using the first-past-the-post system. The elections for the undergraduate Board of Governors representatives and the University Senate student representatives were also held at the same time. The SFUO elections office was headed by the Chief Electoral Officer, appointed by the BoA's Elections Committee and then ratified by the BoA. No members of the SFUO, BoA or executive were allowed to do any work for the elections office.

Voter turnout generally averaged around 11–12% in the last couple of decades prior to dissolution, except for 2009 and 2010, when voter turnout was over 20% as the SFUO used online voting. Previous to that, the highest turnout had been 17%. The record-low voter turnout was 5.7% in 1993.

=== Candidate slates ===
In 2011, a proposal to introduce slates for the general elections was approved by the BoA, after an earlier motion in 2009 had been rejected.

In 2013, candidate slate affiliation began to be listed on the ballots for the general elections. Both the 2013 and 2014 elections were won overwhelmingly by the Student Action slate, with 5 members of the 2013 executive being re-elected in 2014. In 2013, President Ethan Plato brought forward three motions for electoral reform: a preferential balloting system for the elections, a ban on current members of the executive supporting election candidates (unless the member was running for re-election), and removal of slate affiliations from the ballot. All the proposals were defeated, with members of the Student Action slate voting against.

In 2015, the elections saw a low number of candidates, with no candidates nominated for one executive post. Three different slates won executive positions. A Facebook group SFUO Does Not Represent Me emerged around that time channeling student dissatisfaction with the Student Action and its perceived successor, the Impact slate. Later in 2015, two electoral reform motions were presented to the winter GA that would have abolished slates, but both were voted down by the BoA after the GA failed to meet quorum.

=== Online voting ===
Candidates were first given the right to campaign online in 2006.

Online voting for SFUO elections was introduced in 2008. In 2009, voter turnout in the elections reached a record 27%. In 2010, the use of online voting encountered various complications, including allegations of fraud. After these elections, the company that was managing the online voting system refused to work with the SFUO, and the SFUO discontinued the use of online voting. Voter turnout subsequently dropped by about half, to around 11%.

== Controversies ==
=== "In My Skin" scandal ===
The Executives of the Student Federation of the University of Ottawa planned an event called "In My Skin" to be held on March 4, 2014. The event sought to foster two conversations, according to its organizers: each group was to discuss the benefits and disadvantages that racialized and non-racialized students face in dealing with institutional racism. It was planned that students would be split into "breakout groups", where they would discuss discrimination and white privilege and then would regroup to discuss the issues as a whole.

There was a major backlash from students who saw this event as segregation and "reverse racism" because it would split students into different rooms based on skin colours. The Facebook event and debate were shut down, and Nicole Desnoyers, Vice President Equity, released a statement stating that there was no intention of segregation and racism on the part of the SFUO.

=== Fireworks scandal ===
In summer 2014, the SFUO purchased 10,000 dollars' worth of fireworks to celebrate the closing ceremony of that year's 101 Week. SFUO was then notified by the City of Ottawa that they would not be able to use the fireworks due to safety concerns. Several of the Federated Bodies' VP Socials accused SFUO VP Social Ikram Hamoud of failing to work with the Social Round Table, which led to the launch of an impeachment referendum against Hamoud. A Facebook group, "SFUO Does Not Represent Me" gained substantial popularity because of its vocal criticism of the purchase. The 2014 101 Week finished with a budget deficit of almost $80,000.

=== Yoga as cultural appropriation ===
In November 2015, the SFUO cancelled the free yoga classes being put on by the Centre for Students with Disabilities over concerns of cultural appropriation. The news provoked a large backlash from students, and received coverage by international media. The free class was subsequently reinstated with the hiring of an Indian-Canadian instructor. "Cultural issues" were the primary concern cited in an email from the University of Ottawa's Centre for Students with Disabilities, run by the SFUO, to the Ottawa Sun, which stated: "While yoga is a really great idea and accessible and great for students ... there are cultural issues of implication involved in the practice. [Some cultures] have experienced oppression, cultural genocide and diasporas due to colonialism and western supremacy ... we need to be mindful of this and how we express ourselves while practising yoga."

Less than a week later, the Sun reported that the SFUO had changed course and issued a statement attributing declining attendance and a need to "ensure that students' money and resources was being used in a responsible and efficient way," as the reason for the cancellation.

== See also ==
- List of Ontario students' associations
