= Paul Lamek =

Canadian judge (1946–2011)

53rd Treasurer of the Law Society of Upper Canada
- In office 1993–1995
- Preceded by: Allan Rock
- Succeeded by: Eleanor Susan Elliott

Paul Stephen Andrew Lamek was a lawyer and Justice of the Ontario Superior Court of Justice.

== Education ==
Lamek studied law at the University of Oxford and began teaching law at the University of Pennsylvania, then taught at Osgoode Hall Law School from 1962 through 1967.

== Legal career ==
Lamek was the 53rd Treasurer of the Law Society of Upper Canada, serving from 1993 to 1995.

== Judicial career ==
He was appointed a Justice of the Superior Court in Ontario in 1999.

== Personal life ==
Born December 14, 1936, in England and died August 29, 2001, aged 64, in Toronto Canada. Lamek had lost a leg to diabetes. He was friends with lawyers Edward Greenspan and Harvey Thomas Strosberg who delivered his eulogy at the Cathedral Church of St. James (Toronto).
