= Michael Tulloch =

Canadian judge

The Honourable Michael Tulloch
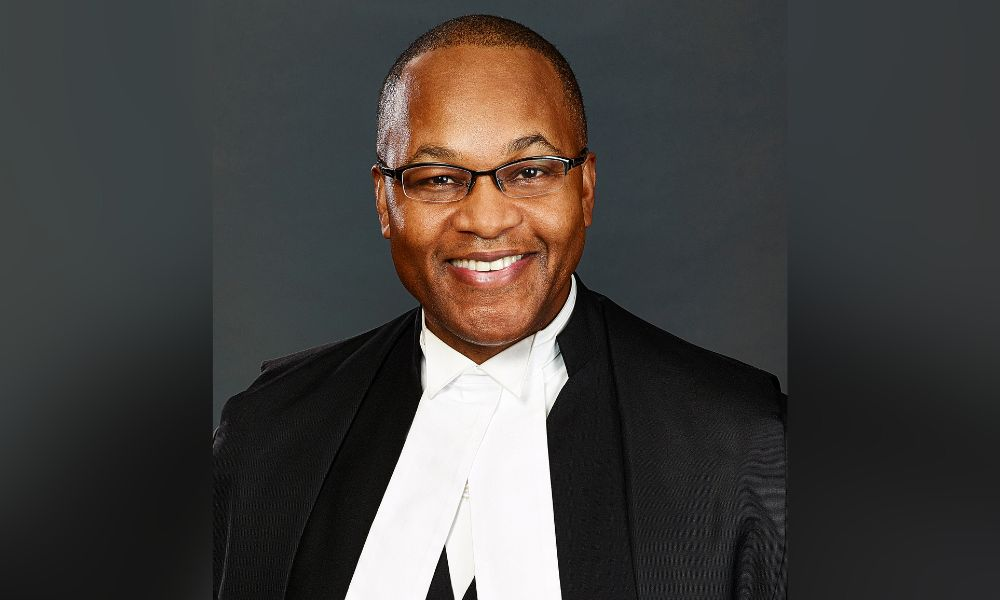
- Tulloch in 2023

22nd Chief Justice of Ontario
- Incumbent
- Assumed office 19 December 2022
- Nominated by: Justin Trudeau
- Appointed by: Mary Simon
- Preceded by: George Strathy

Justice of the Court of Appeal for Ontario
- In office 30 June 2012 – 19 December 2022
- Nominated by: Stephen Harper
- Appointed by: David Johnston

Personal details
- Born: 1961 or 1962 (age 63–64) Jamaica
- Education: York University (BA, LLB)

Michael H. Tulloch (born 1961/1962) is a Canadian judge. On December 19, 2022, Prime Minister Justin Trudeau announced the appointment of Tulloch as the new Chief Justice of Ontario. He is the first Black judge appointed to the Court of Appeal for Ontario and the first Black Chief Justice of any province.

He attended Central Peel Secondary School in Brampton, Ontario, York University in Toronto, and Osgoode Hall Law School. After graduating from law school in 1989, he became an assistant Crown attorney in 1991, and later worked as a private defence lawyer. In 2003, he was appointed as a judge to the Ontario Superior Court of Justice. He was appointed to the Court of Appeal effective June 30, 2012.

In 2013, Tulloch was one of the recipients of the Top 25 Canadian Immigrant Awards presented, by Canadian Immigrant Magazine.

Tulloch is a former president of the Canadian Association of Black Lawyers. He was born in Jamaica and came to Canada when he was 9 years old. He is a Distinguished Fellow at the University of Toronto's Munk School of Global Affairs and Public Policy.
