= James MacDonald Spence =

Canadian lawyer

The Honourable James Spence QC

51st Treasurer of the Law Society of Upper Canada
- In office 1990–1992
- Preceded by: Lee Kenneth Ferrier
- Succeeded by: Allan Rock

James MacDonald Spence QC is a lawyer, arbitrator and mediator. He was formerly a Justice of the Ontario Superior Court of Justice.

== Education ==
Spence earned a BA and an LLB. He was awarded an Honorary LLD in 2001 by the Law Society of Upper Canada.

== Legal career ==
Spence was a partner at the firm that became Torys from 1976 until 1993. He was appointed a QC in 1984.

Spence was first elected a Bencher of the Law Society of Upper Canada in 1983 and became the 51st Treasurer of the Law Society of Upper Canada, serving from 1990 to 1992. He was the Director of the Federation of Law Societies of Canada from 1989 to 1993.

Spence was appointed to the Superior Court of Justice in 1993. He retired from the bench in September 2015 and currently practises as an arbitrator and mediator.
