= William Goldwin Carrington Howland =

Canadian judge (1915–1994)

William G. C. Howland OC OOnt
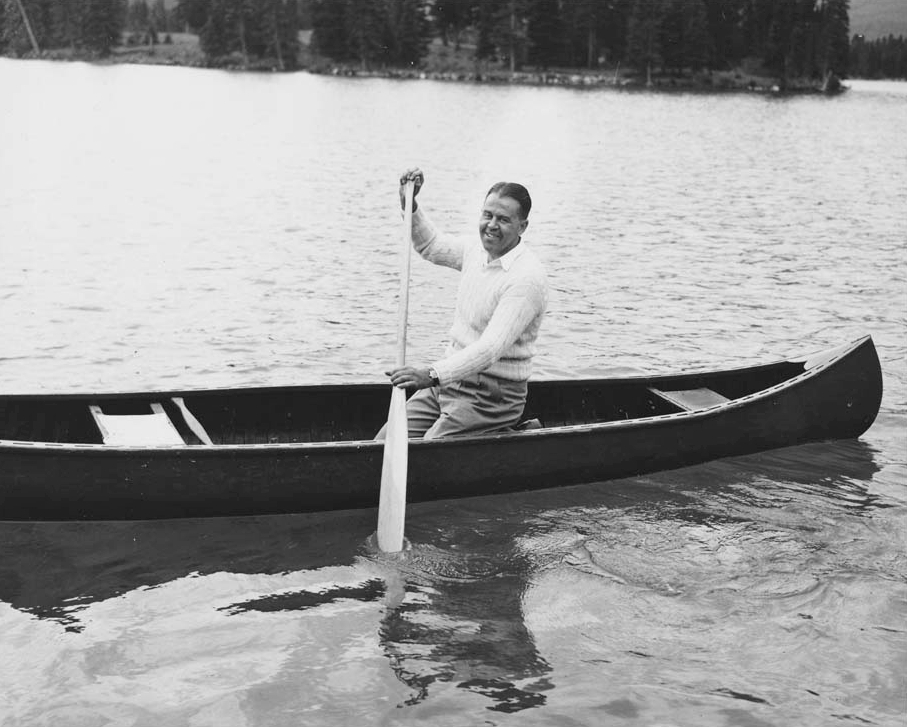
- Conoeing in the 1950s
- Born: March 17, 1915; Toronto, Canada
- Died: May 13, 1994 (aged 79); London, England
- Occupation(s): Lawyer, Jurist
- Spouse: Margaret Patricia Green

William Goldwin Carrington Howland OC OOnt (March 17, 1915 – May 13, 1994) was a Canadian lawyer, judge and former Chief Justice of Ontario.

== Life and career ==
Howland was born in Toronto and educated at Upper Canada College. He graduated from the University of Toronto in 1936, and afterwards enrolled at Osgoode Hall Law School. He was called to the Bar of Ontario in 1939.

During World War II, Howland served with the Royal Canadian Army Service Corps. He appointed Queen's Counsel in 1955 and was elected bencher of the Law Society of Upper Canada in 1961, serving as its treasurer from 1968 to 1970.

In 1975, Howland was appointed a Judge to the Appellate Division of the Supreme Court of Ontario. Two years later, he was appointed Chief Justice of Ontario, and remained in this position until his retirement in 1992.
