= Court of Appeal for Ontario =

Canadian provincial appellate court

- Established: 1867
- Jurisdiction: Ontario
- Location: Osgoode Hall, Toronto
- Authorised by: Courts of Justice Act
- Appeals to: Supreme Court of Canada
- Number of positions: 22 (plus supernumeraries)
- Website: ontariocourts.ca/coa

Chief Justice of Ontario
- Currently: Michael Tulloch
- Since: December 19, 2022

The Court of Appeal for Ontario (frequently mistakenly referred to as the Ontario Court of Appeal) (ONCA is the abbreviation for its neutral citation) is the appellate court for the province of Ontario, Canada. The seat of the court is Osgoode Hall in downtown Toronto (also the seat of the Law Society of Ontario and the Divisional Court of the Ontario Superior Court of Justice).

== Description ==
As of December 1, 2025, the court is composed of 22 judicial seats, in addition to 5 justices who currently sit supernumerary. They hear over 1,500 appeals each year, on issues of private law, constitutional law, criminal law, administrative law and other matters. The Supreme Court of Canada hears appeals from less than 3% of the decisions of the Court of Appeal for Ontario, therefore in a practical sense, the Court of Appeal is the last avenue of appeal for most litigants in Ontario.

Among the Court of Appeal's most notable decisions was the 2003 ruling in Halpern v Canada (AG) that found defining marriage as between one man and one woman to violate Section 15 of the Canadian Charter of Rights and Freedoms, legalizing same-sex marriage in Ontario and making Canada the first jurisdiction in the world where same-sex marriage was legalized by a court ruling. Among many judges from the Court who have been elevated to the Supreme Court of Canada are Justices Rosalie Abella, Louise Arbour, Peter Cory, Louise Charron, Andromache Karakatsanis, Bora Laskin, Michael Moldaver, and Mahmud Jamal, as well as Bertha Wilson, who was the first female justice on both the Court of Appeal for Ontario (1975) and the Supreme Court of Canada (1982).

The Court of Appeal derives its jurisdiction from Ontario's Courts of Justice Act.

== Current judges ==
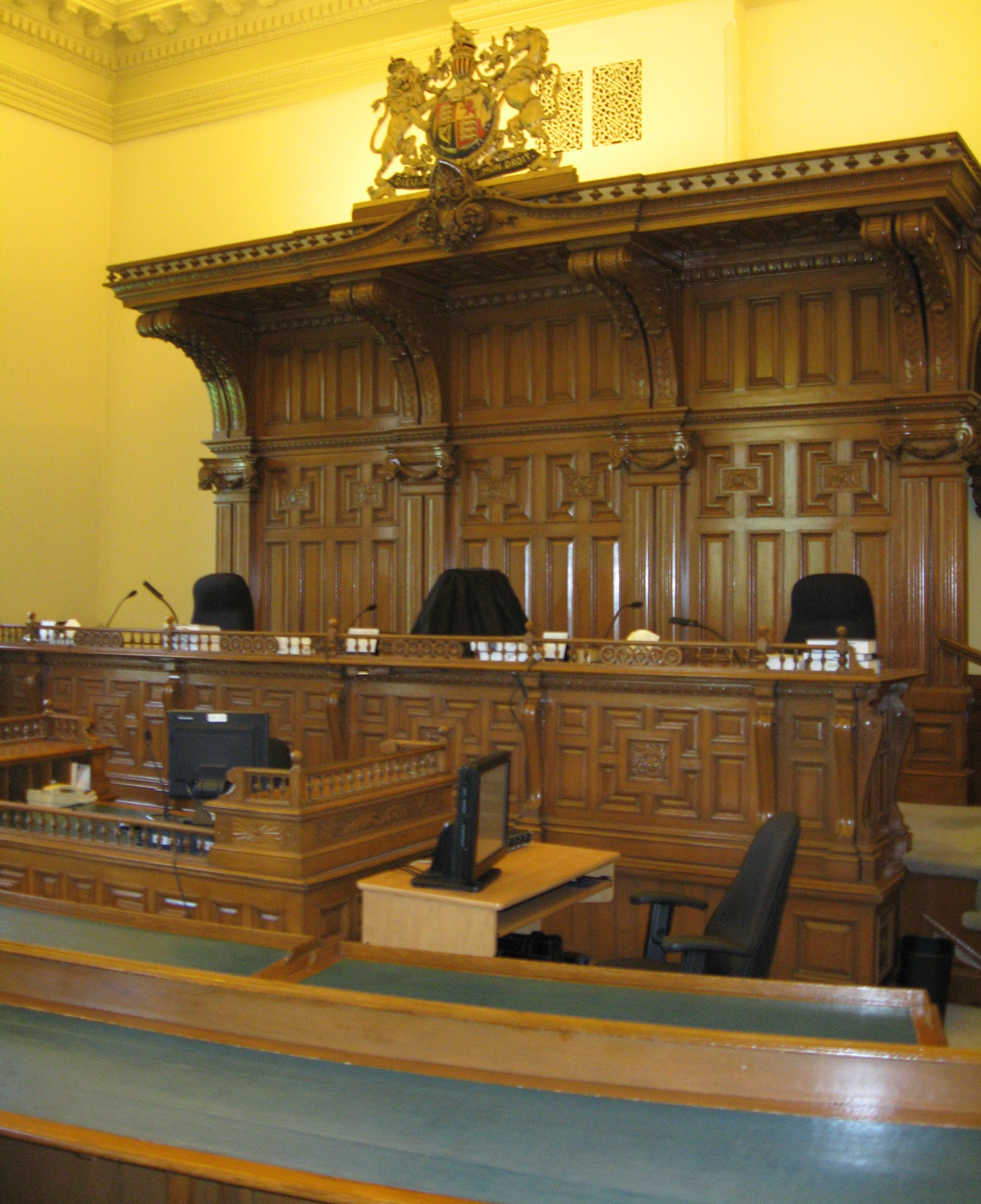
A courtroom at Osgoode Hall. Over the dais are the Royal Arms of the United Kingdom, which until 1931 were the Royal Arms for general purposes throughout the British Empire. The Statute of Westminster 1931 effectively elevated the Royal Arms of Canada to the position of the King's Royal Arms for general purposes across Canada, which is why the Royal Arms of Canada are now used in courtrooms built since 1931 to represent the Canadian Crown.

Position	Name	Appointed	Nominated by	Position(s) Prior to Appointment*
Chief Justice	Michael Tulloch	30 June 2012; 19 December 2022 (as chief)	Harper; J. Trudeau	Superior Court of Justice (2003 to 2012); Private practice
Associate Chief Justice	J. Michal Fairburn	18 July 2017; 3 September 2020	J. Trudeau	Superior Court of Justice (December 16, 2014 to July 18, 2017); Stockwoods Ontario Crown Law Office
Justice	Jill Copeland	28 March 2022	J. Trudeau	Superior Court of Justice (2017 to 2022); Ontario Court of Justice (2014 to 2017)
Justice	Steve A. Coroza	6 April 2020	J. Trudeau	Superior Court of Justice (2013 to 2020); Ontario Court of Justice (2009 to 2013)
Justice	Jonathan Dawe	6 November 2023	J. Trudeau	Superior Court of Justice (2018 to 2023)
Justice	Jonathon George	20 December 2021	J. Trudeau	Superior Court of Justice (2016 to 2021); Ontario Court of Justice (2012 to 2016)
Justice	Lise Favreau	20 December 2021	J. Trudeau	Superior Court of Justice (2017 to 2021)
Justice	Sally Gomery	6 November 2023	J. Trudeau	Superior Court of Justice (2017 to 2023)
Justice	Grant Huscroft	16 December 2014	Harper	Professor, Western Law School (2002 to 2014); University of Auckland (1992 to 2001)
Justice	Lene Madsen	1 May 2024	J. Trudeau	Superior Court of Justice (2016 to 2024)
Justice	Bradley W. Miller	26 June 2015	Harper	Superior Court of Justice
Justice	Patrick Monahan	15 May 2023	J. Trudeau	Superior Court of Justice (2017 to 2023)
Justice	Peter Osborne	16 December 2025	M. Carney	Superior Court of Justice (2022 to 2025)
Justice	David M. Paciocco	7 April 2017	J. Trudeau	Ontario Court of Justice; Professor at University of Ottawa and Counsel at Edelson Clifford D'Angelo
Justice	Renee Pomerance	24 July 2024	J. Trudeau	Superior Court of Justice (2006 to 2024)
Justice	Mohammed Rahman	7 March 2025	J. Trudeau	Superior Court of Justice (2022 to 2025); Ontario Court of Justice (2016 to 2022)
Justice	Lois Roberts	5 May 2015	Harper	Superior Court of Justice (2008 to 2015); Genest Murray LLP (1988 to 2008); Cassels Brock (1987 to 1988)
Justice	Lorne Sossin	26 November 2020	J. Trudeau	Superior Court of Justice (2018 to 2020); Dean, Osgoode Hall Law School (2010 to 2018)
Justice	Julie Thorburn	1 September 2019	J. Trudeau	Superior Court of Justice (2006 to 2019)
Justice	Gary T. Trotter	20 October 2016	J. Trudeau	Superior Court of Justice (2008 to 2016); Ontario Court of Justice (2005 to 2008); Professor at Queen's University (2003 to 2016); Ontario Crown Counsel (1988 to 2000)
Justice	Darla Wilson	1 May 2024	J. Trudeau	Superior Court of Justice (2007 to 2024)
Justice	Benjamin Zarnett	9 November 2018	J. Trudeau	Goodmans LLP

Supernumerary Justices

Position	Name	Appointed	Nominated by	Position(s) Prior to Appointment*
Supernumerary Justice	Eileen E. Gillese	5 January 2002	Chrétien	Superior Court of Justice (1999 to 2002)
Supernumerary Justice	Peter Lauwers	14 December 2012	Harper	Superior Court of Justice (2008 to 2012); Miller Thompson LLP
Supernumerary Justice	Paul Rouleau	15 April 2005	Martin	Superior Court of Justice (2002 to 2005); Heenan Blaikie
Supernumerary Justice	Janet M. Simmons	23 August 2000	Chrétien	Superior Court of Justice
Supernumerary Justice	Katherine van Rensburg	2 October 2013	Harper	Superior Court of Justice (2006 to 2013); Gowling Lafleur Henderson LLP

== Chief Justices of Ontario ==
Number	Name	Years
1	Sir William Buell Richards (Note: Of the Court of Queen's Bench)	1868–1875
2	Robert Alexander Harrison	1875–1878
3	Thomas Moss	1878–1881
4	John Godfrey Spragge	1881–1884
5	Sir John Hawkins Hagarty	1884–1897
6	Sir George William Burton	1897–1900
7	John Douglas Armour	1900–1902
8	Sir Charles Moss	1902–1912
9	Sir William Ralph Meredith	1912–1923
10	Sir William Mulock	1923–1936
11	Newton Rowell	1936–1938
12	Robert Spelman Robertson	1938–1952
13	John Wellington Pickup	1952–1957
14	Dana Porter	1958–1967
15	George Alexander Gale	1967–1976
16	Willard Estey	1976–1977
17	William Goldwin Carrington Howland	1977–1990
18	Charles Dubin	1990–1996
19	Roy McMurtry	1996–2007
20	Warren Winkler	2007–2013
21	George Strathy	2014–2022
22	Michael Tulloch	2022–present

== Past judges ==
Name	Time in office	Nominated by
Marc Rosenberg	1995–2015	Jean Chretien
Stephen Goudge	1996–2014	Jean Chretien
Edward W. Ducharme	2012 - 2013	Stephen Harper
Warren Winkler, Chief Justice	2007–2013	
Dennis O'Connor	1998–2012	Jean Chretien
Michael Moldaver	1995–2011	Jean Chretien
Andromache Karakatsanis	2010–2011	
Marvin A. Catzman	1988–2007	
Roy McMurtry	1996–2007 as Chief Justice	
Louise Charron	1995–2004	Jean Chretien
Robert P. Armstrong	2002–2013	
Rosalie Abella	1992–2004	
Louise Arbour	1990–1999	
Charles Dubin	1973–1996 (1992–1996 as Chief Justice)	
William Goldwin Carrington Howland as Chief Justice	1977–1992	
Walter Tarnopolsky	1985–1993	
Peter Cory	1981–1989	
Bert MacKinnon	1974–1987 as Associate Chief Justice	
Bertha Wilson	1975–1982	
Goldwyn Arthur Martin	1973–1988	
Bora Laskin	1965–1970	
Jean-Marc Labrosse	1990–2007	
Roy Kellock	1942–1944	
Henry Hague Davis	1933–1935	
Newton Rowell as Chief Justice	1936–1937	
Sir William Mulock as Chief Justice	1923–1936	
John Douglas Armour	1887–1890 (as Chief Justice) (1901–1902)	
John Hawkins Hagarty as Chief Justice	1884–1897	
Thomas Moss as Chief Justice	1878–1880	
Robert Alexander Harrison as Chief Justice	1875–1878	

== Chief Justices of Upper Canada (1792–1841)/Province of Canada (1841–1867) ==
Number	Name	Years
1	William Osgoode	1792–1794
2	John Elmsley	1796–1802
3	Henry Allcock	1802–1806
4	Thomas Scott	1806–1816
5	William Dummer Powell	1816–1825
6	Sir William Campbell	1825–1829
7	Sir John Beverley Robinson	1829–1862
8	William Henry Draper	1863–1867

== See also ==
- Courts of Ontario
- Supreme Court of Canada
