= Robert Spelman Robertson =

Canadian lawyer and judge

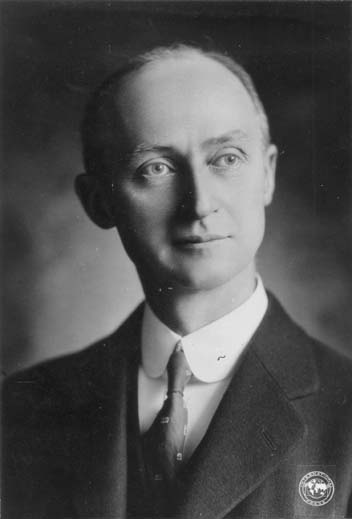

Robert Spelman Robertson (December 11, 1870 – May 28, 1955) was a Canadian lawyer and judge. He was Chief Justice of Ontario from 1938 to 1952.

== Biography ==
Born in Goderich, Ontario, Robertson read law with Mr Justice J. T. Garrow and was called to the Ontario Bar in 1894. He entered private practice, first in Stratford, Ontario, until he was recruited by Fasken in Toronto in 1917. He was made a King's Counsel in 1921. He was a prominent civil litigator, and was one of William Lyon Mackenzie King's favourite litigators in constitutional cases.

He was elected a bencher of the Law Society of Upper Canada in 1930 and was Treasurer of the Law Society of Upper Canada from 1937 to 1938, when he was appointed Chief Justice. He retired in 1952 and died three years later.
