= Îles de Los =

Island group off Conakry in Guinea

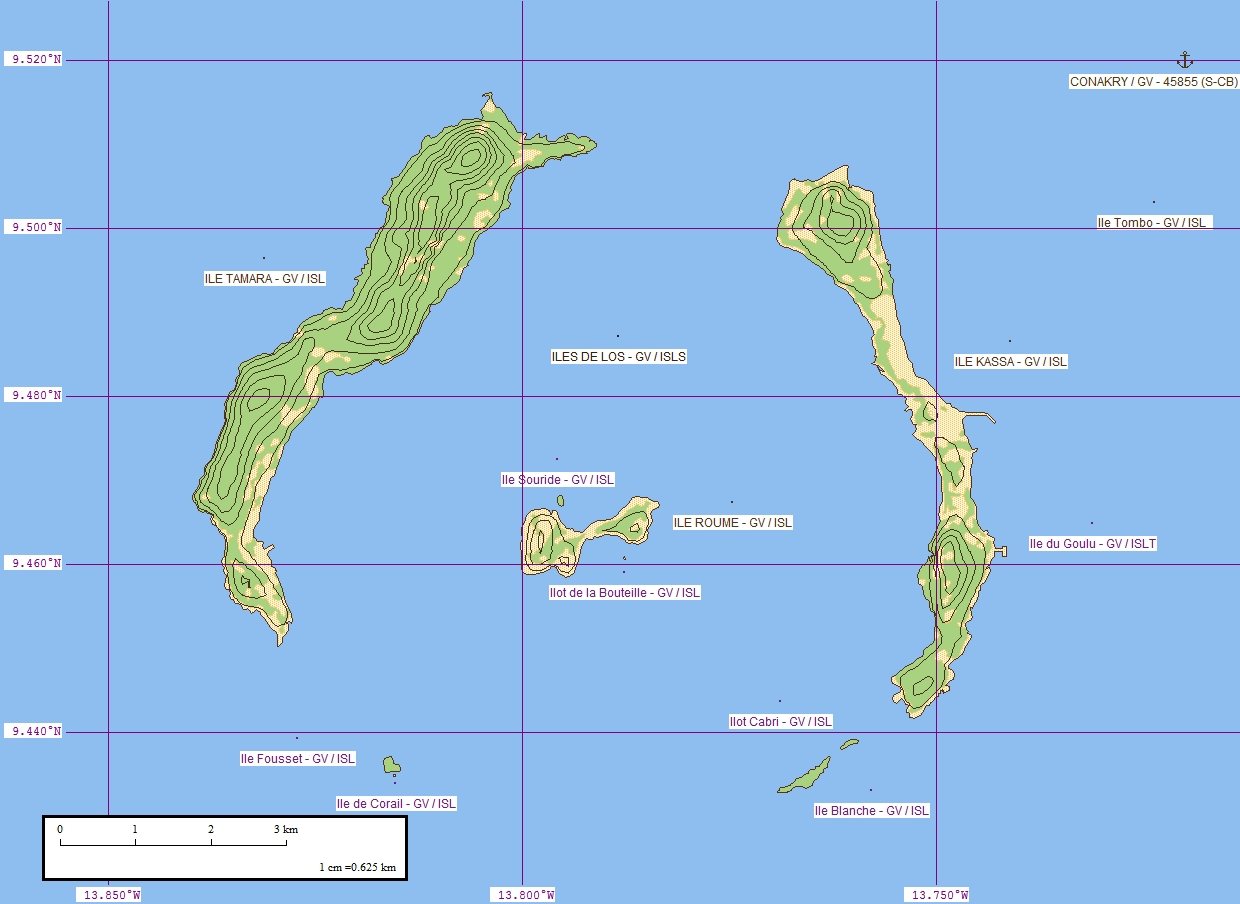

- Location within Guinea

Geography
- Location: Atlantic Ocean
- Coordinates: 09°27′45″N 13°47′42″W
- Archipelago: Îles de Los
- Total islands: 8
- Major islands: Tamara (Fortoba), Kassa and Roume
- Area: 80 km^{2} (31 sq mi)
- Length: 10 km (6 mi)
- Width: 7 km (4.3 mi)
- Highest elevation: 47 m (154 ft)
- Highest point: Sommet Lacroix

Administration
- Guinea
- Region: Conakry Region
- Prefecture: Conakry Special Zone
- Sub-Prefecture: Kaloum

The Îles de Los ([il də lo]) are an island group lying off Conakry, Guinea, on the west coast of Africa. Their name is derived from the Portuguese Ilhas dos Ídolos, meaning "islands of the idols". They are located about two kilometres (one nautical mile) off the headland limiting the southern side of Sangareya Bay. Administratively, the islands form a commune to the southwest of the Conakry peninsula, named as the Kassa Commune, with a land area of 14.29 km^{2} and a population of 9,257 at the 1 July 2025 Census (preliminary return); they were formerly part of Kaloum commune.

The islands are best known for their beaches and forested interiors and are popular with tourists. Ferries sail to the Îles de Los from Kaloum on the Conakry mainland.

== Geography ==
There are three main islands: Tamara (Fortoba), Kassa and Roume. Roume forms the centre of the archipelago, with Kassa and Tamara together forming a nearly complete ring about it. Île de Corail, Île Blanche, Île Cabris, Île Poulet, Îlot Cabri and Îlot de la Bouteille are smaller islands and islets located in the southern half.

=== Tamara ===
Tamara is home to the Île Tamara Lighthouse. The island used to have a prison.

=== Kassa ===
Kassa's name is derived from the Portuguese word "casa", meaning "house". Formerly known as Factory Island, it houses the main settlement in the islands.

== Geology ==
The ring shape of the Îles de Los belie their origins as a volcanic structure, an igneous intrusion amid the sediments of the West African continental shelf, which dates to the Cretaceous Period during the opening of the South Atlantic Ocean. The same processes formed nearby Mount Kakoulima, in Guinea, and the hills in and around Freetown, Sierra Leone. The archipelago is composed of the uncommon rock syenite, also found in similar volcanic structures such as the Monteregian Hills in Quebec or the Ilimaussaq intrusive complex in Greenland.

== History ==
The islands have been inhabited by people who originally spoke the Kaloum or Kalum dialect of the Baga language by a group of Baga people for a long time before it later became a hub for the Atlantic slave trade when in 1755, Miles Barber of the African Company of Liverpool established a trading post (then known as a factory) there employing workers skilled in ship repair as well as pilots for the local rivers. This led to Kassa being known as "Factory Island". English-language sources in the 18th century gave various corrupted names for the islands including "Isles of Loss", "the Edlesses", "The Idols", or "Las Idolas".

In 1812 Samuel Samo, a Dutch slave trader, was seized by the British there and taken to Freetown, Sierra Leone, where he appeared before the Vice Admiralty Court. He was the first person tried under the British Slave Trade Felony Act 1811. (See for context the 1818 Anglo-Dutch Slave Trade Treaty which established Mixed Commission Courts.)

=== British possession (1818–1904) ===
Charles MacCarthy, the Governor of Sierra Leone, signed a treaty with Mangé Demba on 6 July 1818, whereby the islands were ceded to the British Empire for the payment of an annual rent. McCarthy then asked Peter Machlan, a surgeon with the 2nd West Indian Regiment to write an account of the islands and surrounding areas. This was published as Travels into the Baga and Soosoo country during the year 1821.

=== Part of French Guinea (1904–1958) ===
Following a visit by Edward VII to France, and a return visit by the French President Émile Loubet, the French and British governments signed the Entente Cordiale on 7 April 1904: among many other matters, Îles de Los was handed over to France in exchange for France relinquishing fishing rights in Newfoundland. The islands were incorporated into French Guinea, one of the constituent parts of French West Africa, in July 1904. Scipio O'Connor was the first colonial administrator appointed by the French.

== See also ==
- Geographic data related to Îles de Los at OpenStreetMap
