= Samuel Beckles =

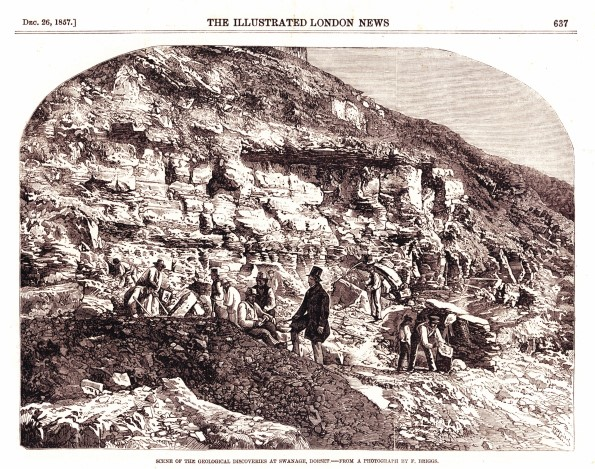
Beckles' Pit at Durlston Bay, with Samuel Beckles wearing a top hat, directing operations

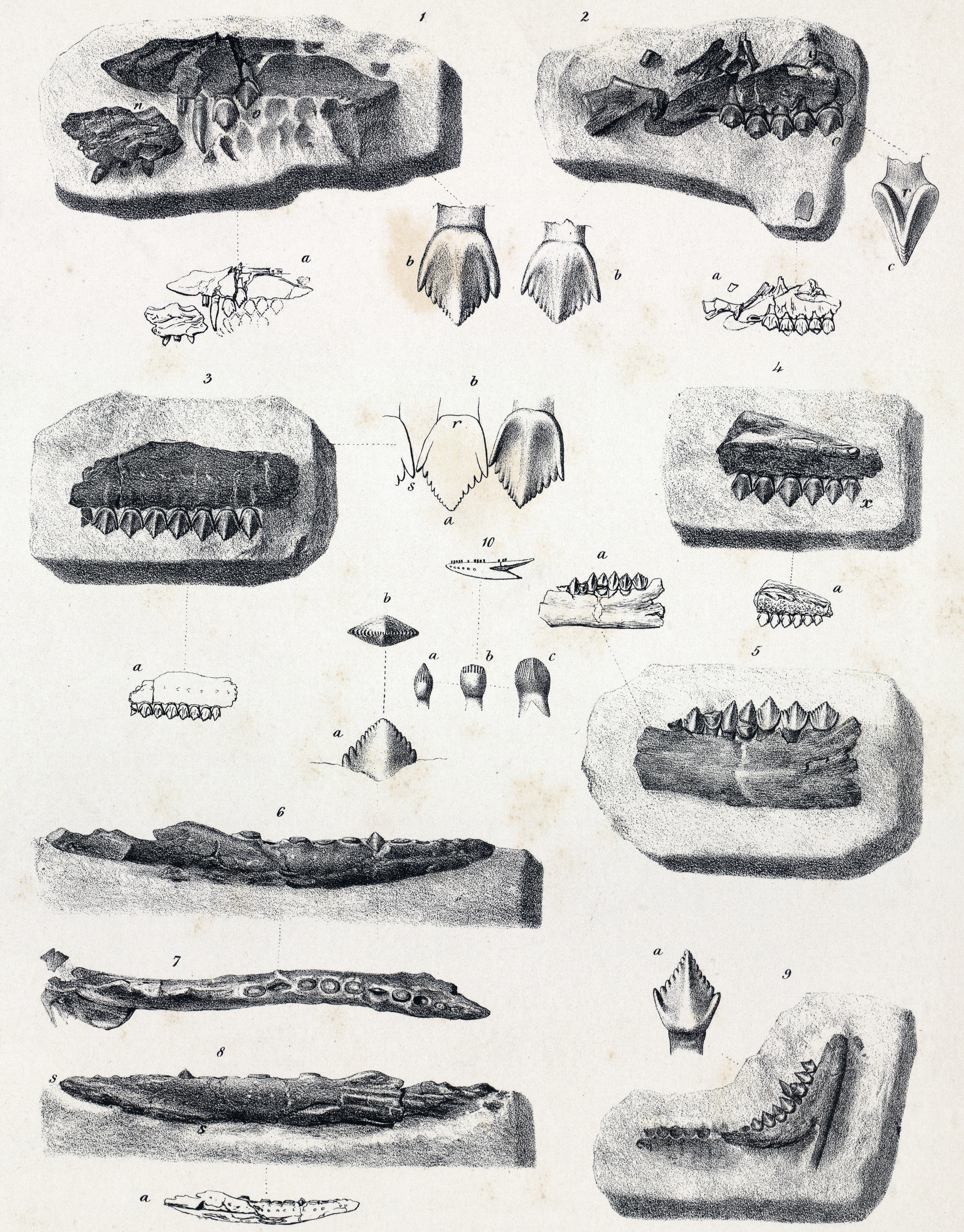
Teeth and jaw fragments referred to Echinodon, material found by Samuel Beckles

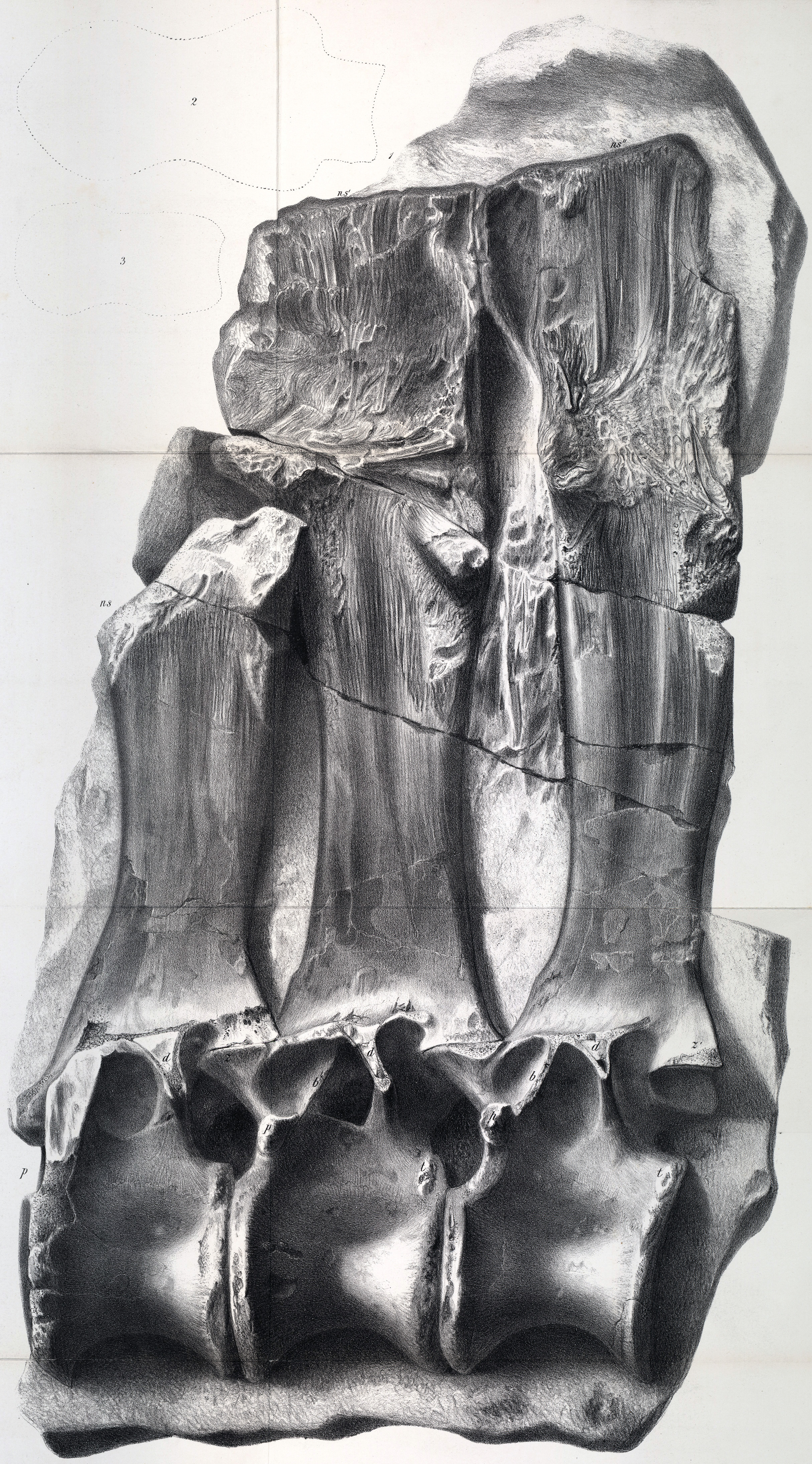
Three vertebrae with attached spines, the holotype of Altispinax, the specimen found by Beckles near Battle, lithograph by Owen

Samuel Husbands Beckles (12 April 1814, in Barbados – 4 September 1890, in Hastings) was a Bajan/English 19th-century lawyer, turned dinosaur hunter, who collected remains in Sussex and the Isle of Wight. In 1854 he described bird-like trackways that he thought could have been made by dinosaurs, which he later identified as probably those of Iguanodon in 1862. In 1857, following the discovery of a mammal jaw at Durlston Bay, he directed a major excavation that became known as 'Beckles' Pit', removing five metres of overburden over a 600 square metre area, one of the largest ever scientific excavations. The collection of mammal fossils that resulted is now mainly held at the Natural History Museum. He discovered the small herbivorous dinosaur Echinodon. The only known species Echinodon becklesii, the mammal Plagiaulax becklesii and the dinosaur Becklespinax were named in his honour (although the last of these is now known as Altispinax).

== Early life ==
Beckles was born on 12 April 1814 in Barbados. He was the seventh child of John Alleyne Beckles and Elizabeth née Spooner. His father was at that time Chief Judge of the Court of Vice Admiralty of Barbados, later becoming President of the Legislative Council of Barbados. Samuel moved to England, becoming a student of the Middle Temple in 1835. He was called to the bar in 1838 and in the same year married his first cousin Susannah Henry. He retired from his life as a barrister due to ill health in 1845, moving to St Leonards-on-Sea in East Sussex.

== Fossil collector ==
Beckles spent his remaining 45 years collecting fossils, apparently unrestricted by his health. He published a series of papers on his fossil discoveries in the Quarterly Journal of the Geological Society of London. Between 1851 and 1854 he published three accounts of footprints from the Lower Cretaceous Wealden rocks near Hastings, identifying them as the imprints of large bipedal animals, possibly birds. He became a fellow of the Geological Society of London in 1854. By 1862 he was prepared to link these trackways with dinosaurs, particularly Iguanodon. In 1854 a mammal jaw was discovered at Durlston Bay by William Brodie of Swanage and he made further discoveries over the next two years. Richard Owen persuaded Beckles to carry out an excavation of the area where the jaw had been found and this commenced in 1856. Beckles both supervised and paid for the excavation, which became known as 'Beckles' Pit'. An area of more than 600 square metres was excavated, removing an overburden 5 m in thickness. The mammal bed, a layer of marl known as a "dirt bed", itself averaged only 5 in (13 cm) in thickness. The excavation lasted for nine months and was featured in the Illustrated London News. At least twelve species of mammals were recovered, along with the remains of reptiles, insects and freshwater shells. In 1859 he was elected as a Fellow of the Royal Society in recognition of his ability and enthusiasm in this endeavour. The recovered specimens were sent straight to Charles Lyell, who handed them to Hugh Falconer for the initial description. Lyell then sent the material on to Owen, who published his descriptions in 1871.

Following the death of his first wife, Beckles married for a second time in 1882, to Jane Gordon. Beckles died on 4 September 1890.
