= Peter Machlan =

Scottish surgeon and author (179? – 1832)

Peter Machlan (179? – 1 August 1832) was a Scottish medical doctor who served as Assistant Staff Surgeon of the 2nd Regiment of the West India Regiment. Whilst serving in Sierra Leone, he was sent by the governor, Charles MacCarthy to the Iles de Los, for his health. He was also requested to write a report on the area, in which connection he made three trips to the mainland of what is now Guinea, in particular he covered the areas around Rio Nunez, Rio Pongo and the Fatala River. His report Travels into the Baga and Soosoo country during the year 1821 was first published in the Royal Gazette and Sierra Leone Advertiser, October–November 1821. These instalments were then gathered to gether in a single book published in Freetown, Sierra Leone, this being perhaps the first monograph published in Sub-Saharan Africa.

== Career ==
Machlan served as a four-year apprenticeship with Dr Thomas Millar, a surgeon in Greenock, Renfrewshire. He then got a job at the Merchant Seaman's Hospital, but after a year he became a student at the Glasgow Royal Infirmary. He then moved to Edinburgh. Eventually in 1814 he received a diploma from the Royal College of Surgeons there. He then joined the Army with the role of Hospital Mate on 14 July 1815.
