= William Henry Leigh =

William Henry Leigh may refer to:

- William Henry Leigh, 2nd Baron Leigh (1824–1905), British politician
- William Henry Leigh (merchant) (1781–1818), merchant and former colonial official in Sierra Leone
