= Governor Turner =

Governor Turner may refer to:

- Charles Turner (British Army officer) (died 1826), Governor-in-Chief of Sierra Leone from 1825 to 1826
- Christopher J. Turner (1933–2014), Governor of the Turks and Caicos from 1982 to 1987 and Governor of Montserrat from 1987 to 1990
- Dan W. Turner (1877–1969), 25th Governor of Iowa
- James Turner (North Carolina politician) (1766–1824), 12th Governor of North Carolina
- Roy J. Turner (1894–1973), 13th Governor of Oklahoma
- Thomas G. Turner (1810–1875), 26th Governor of Rhode Island
- Tomkyns Hilgrove Turner (1764–1843), Governor of Bermuda from 1826 to 1832
