= Charles Turner (British Army officer) =

British Army officer and colonial governor

Major-general Charles Turner CB (? – 11 March 1826) was a British Army officer and colonial governor.

== Career ==
Turner became an ensign in the 2nd (The Queen's Royal) Regiment of Foot on 21 October 1795. After promotion to lieutenant, he saw service in Ireland and captured the Irish revolutionary Napper Tandy. Refusing to accept the reward offered for Tandy's capture, on 8 June 1803 the British government instead presented Turner with a Company in the Royal African Corps. He became a major in the Royal West India Rangers and was promoted to lieutenant-colonel on 28 May 1807. During the Peninsular War, Turner lost an arm at the Siege of Badajoz and retired on half-pay on 25 December 1818. Turner was awarded the Portuguese Commander of the Order of the Tower and Sword and the Turkish Order of the Crescent.

=== Sierra Leone ===
Following the death of incumbent governor Charles MacCarthy in 1824 in the First Anglo-Ashanti War (1823–1831), Turner was commissioned as Captain-general and appointed as Governor-in-Chief of Sierra Leone and its dependencies (including the Gold Coast). He arrived on the Cape Coast around the end of March 1825, along with 200 men of the Royal Africa Corps and 200 from the 2nd West India Regiment from Sierra Leone.

In September 1825, Turner negotiated a treaty on behalf of the British government with the Sherbro king, Banka. Under this treaty, the British acquired additional territory from the local tribespeople, as well as an agreement that the Sherbro would not attack any British facilities in Sierra Leone, and in return the British agreed that their military would protect the Sherbro people from attack. Both sides kept their end of the bargain, which was notable due to the fact that in the history of colonialism in West Africa, this was rare. For this reason, Turner was regarded as honorable by the Sherbro people.
