= Joseph Dinkel =

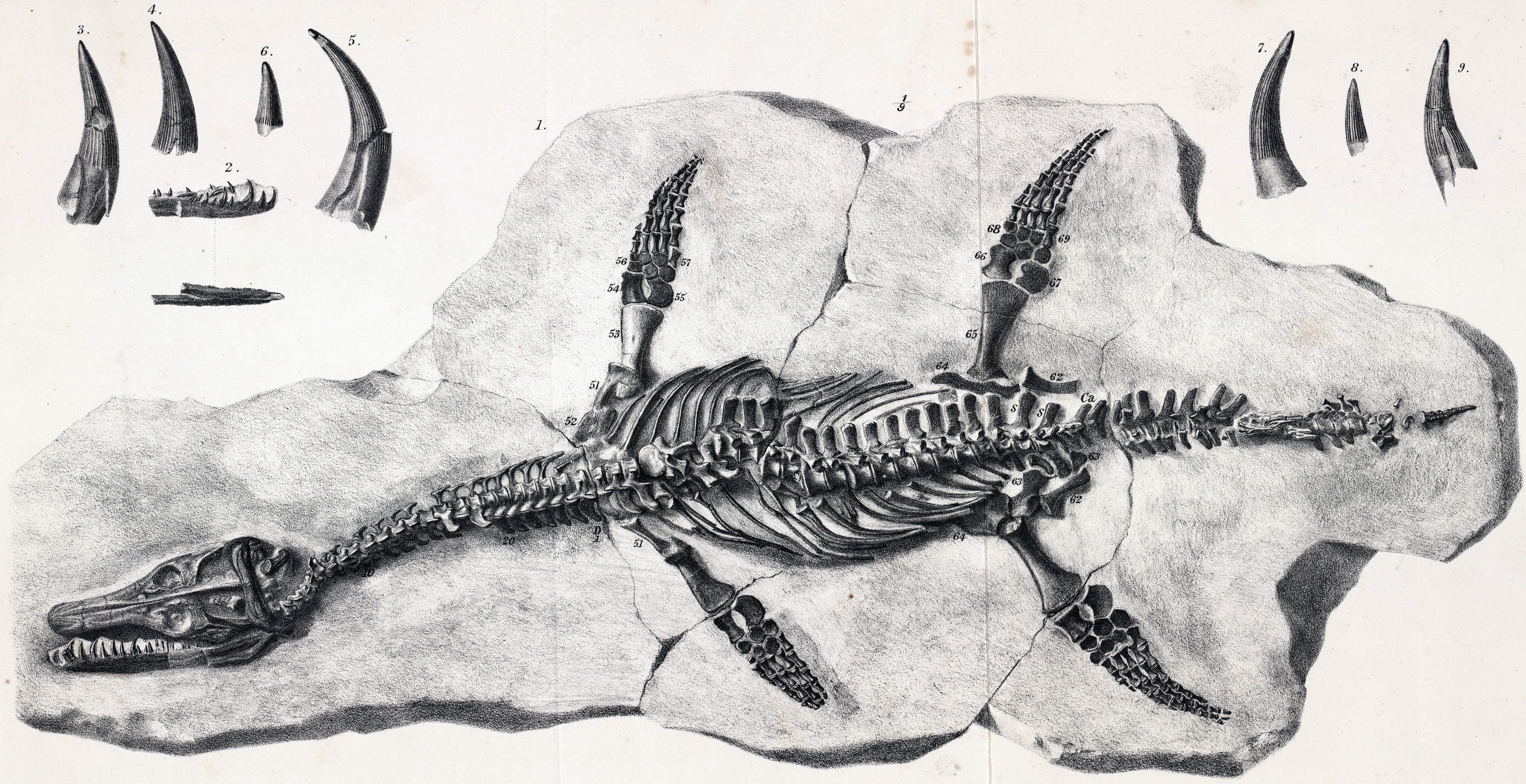

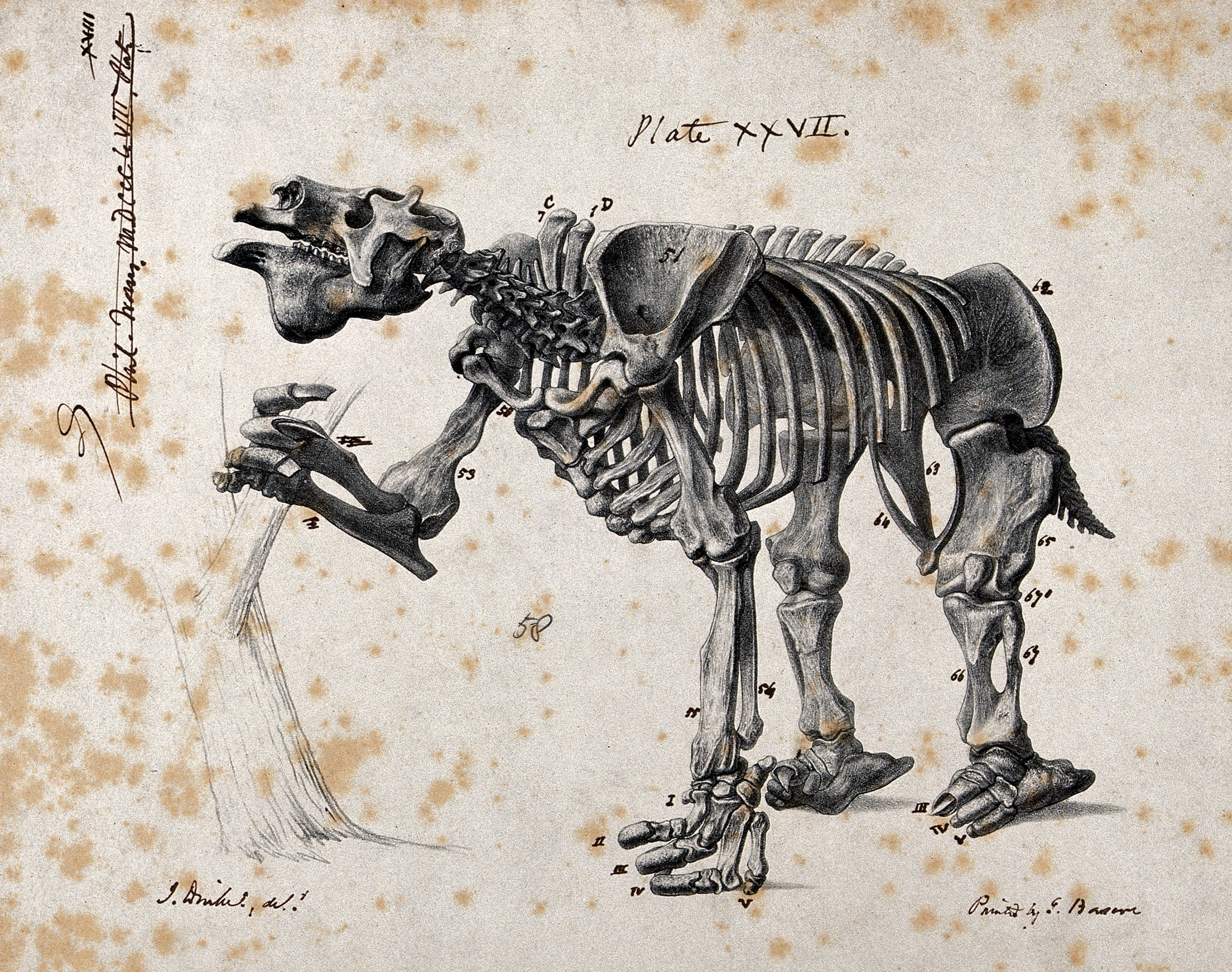
Skeleton of a mammal

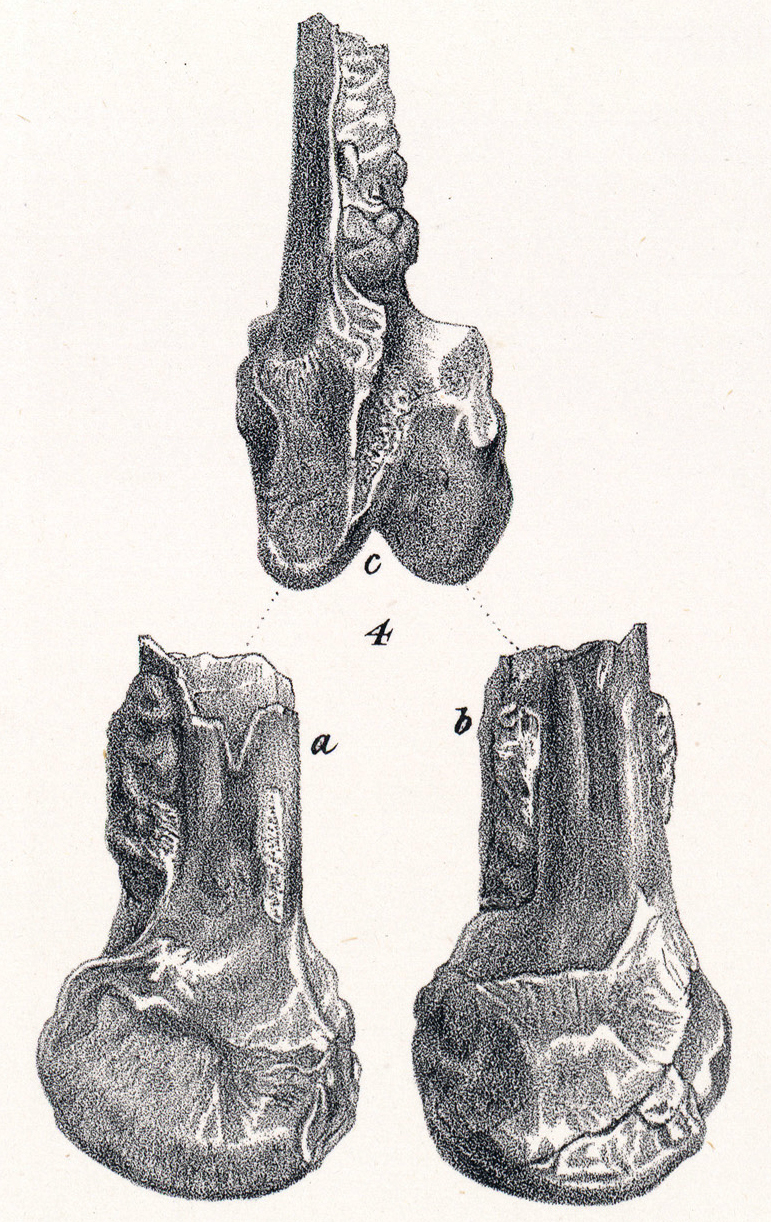
Cimoliornis diomedeus

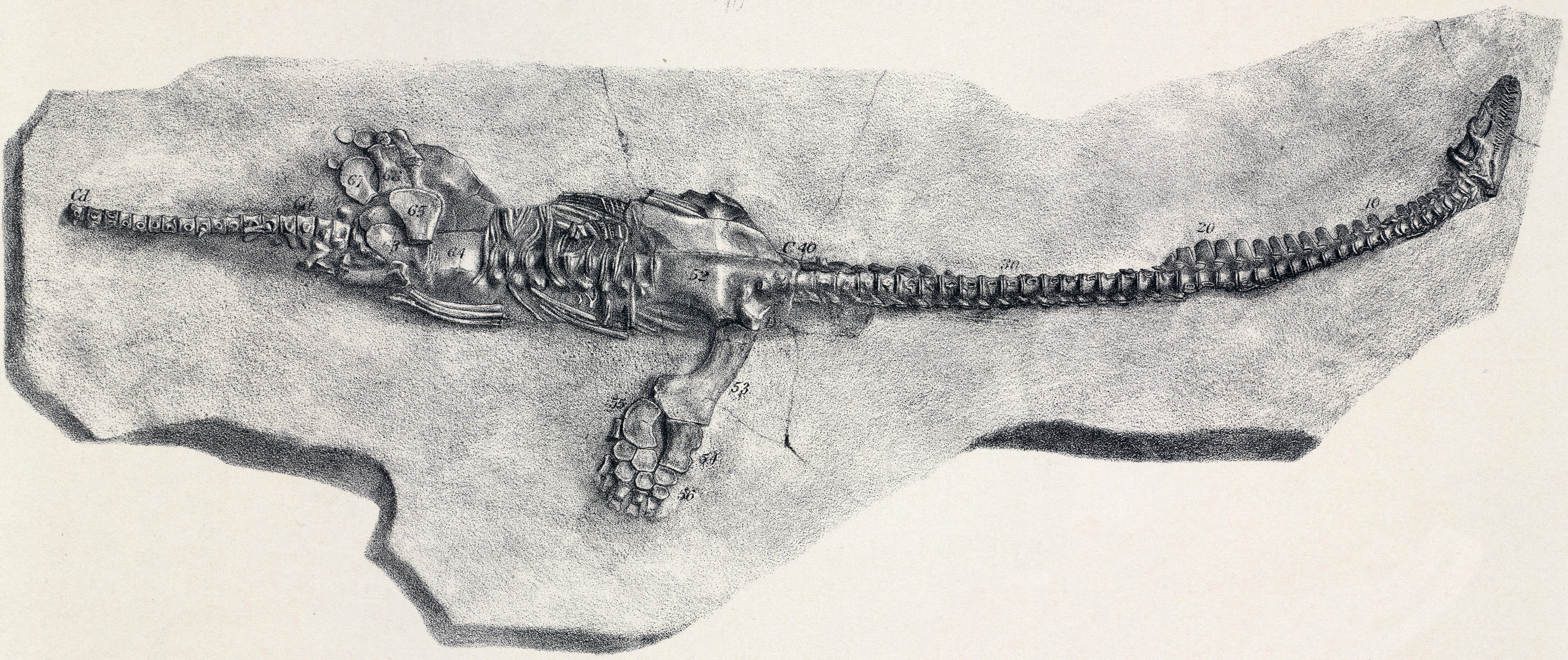

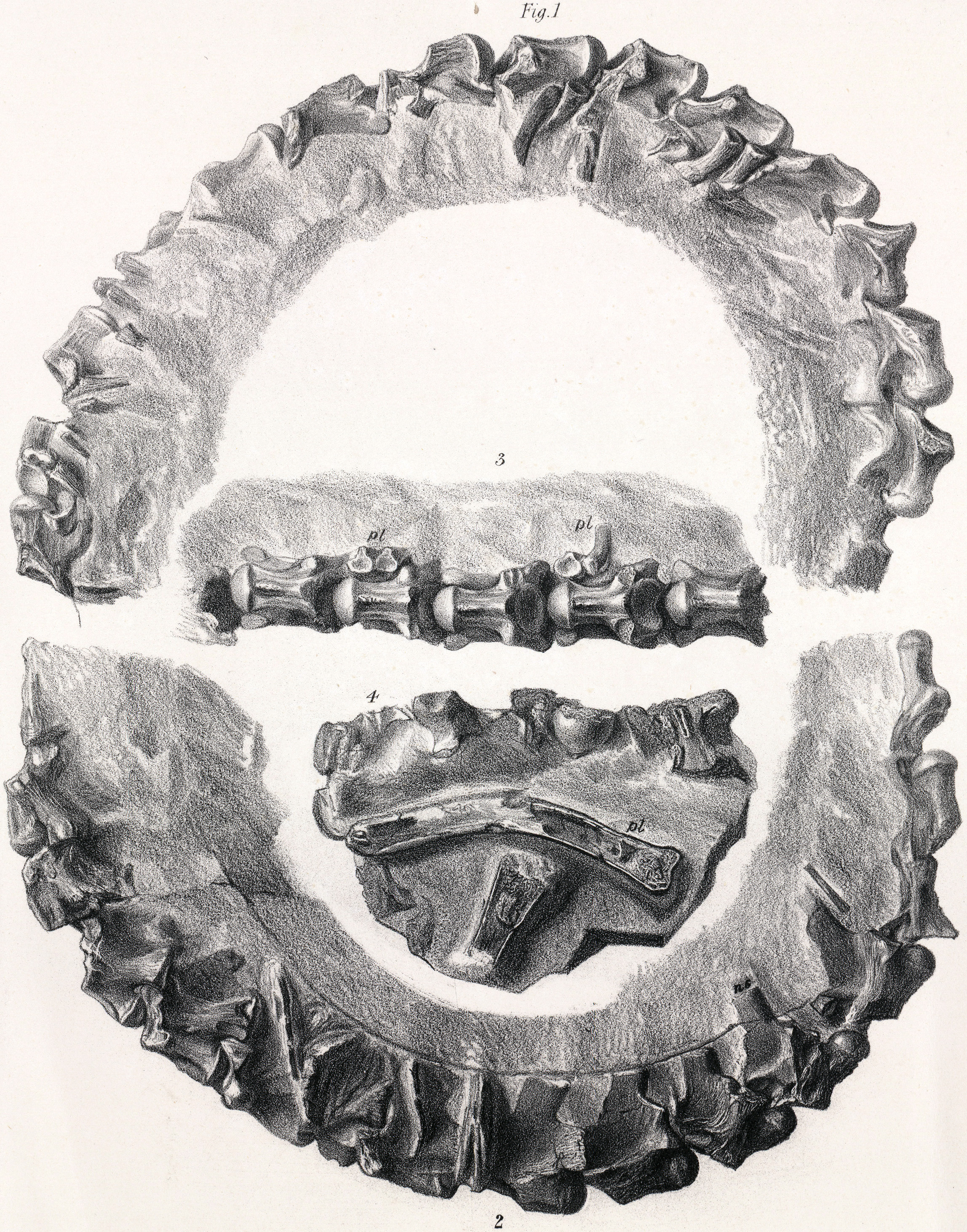

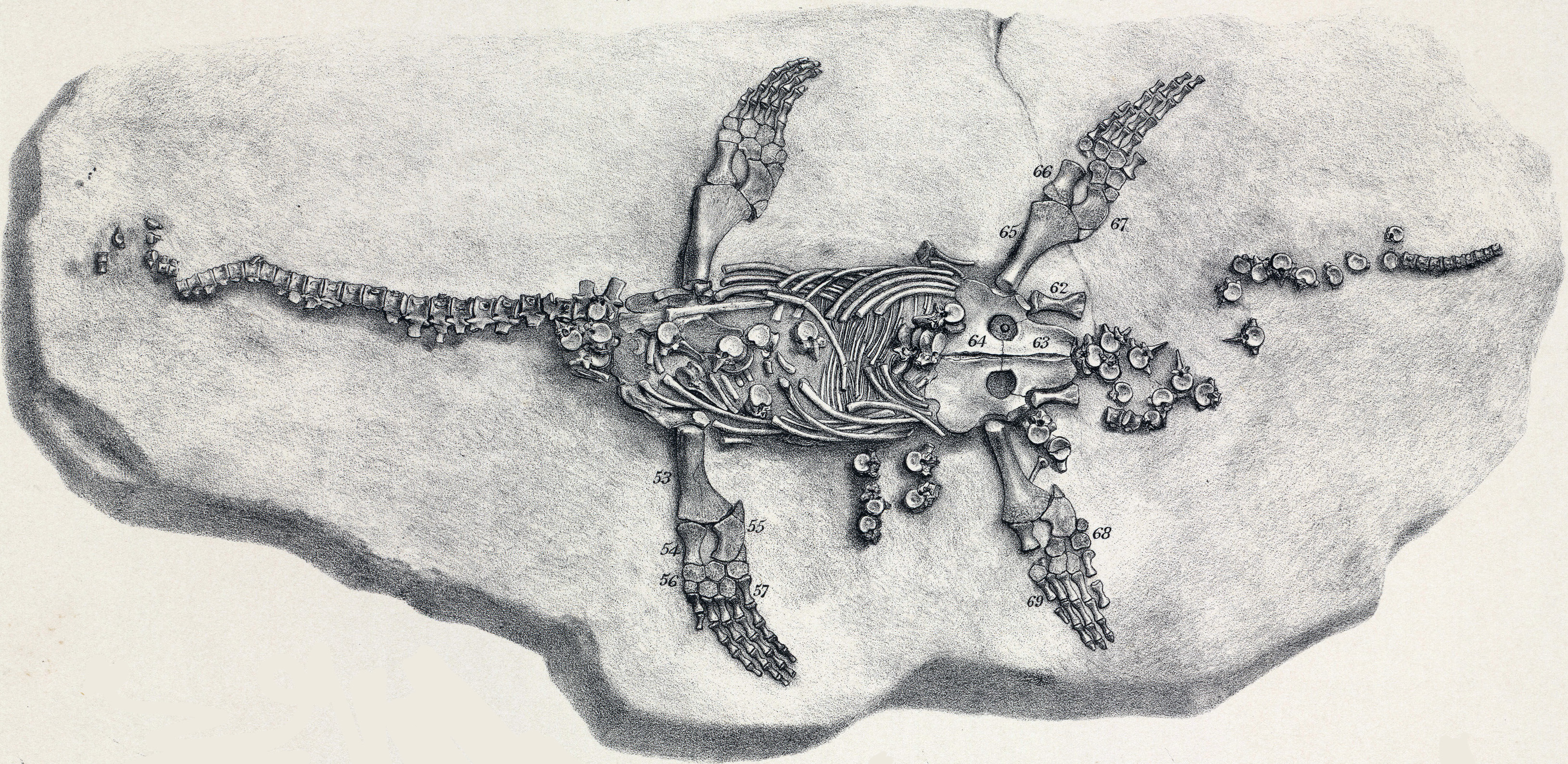

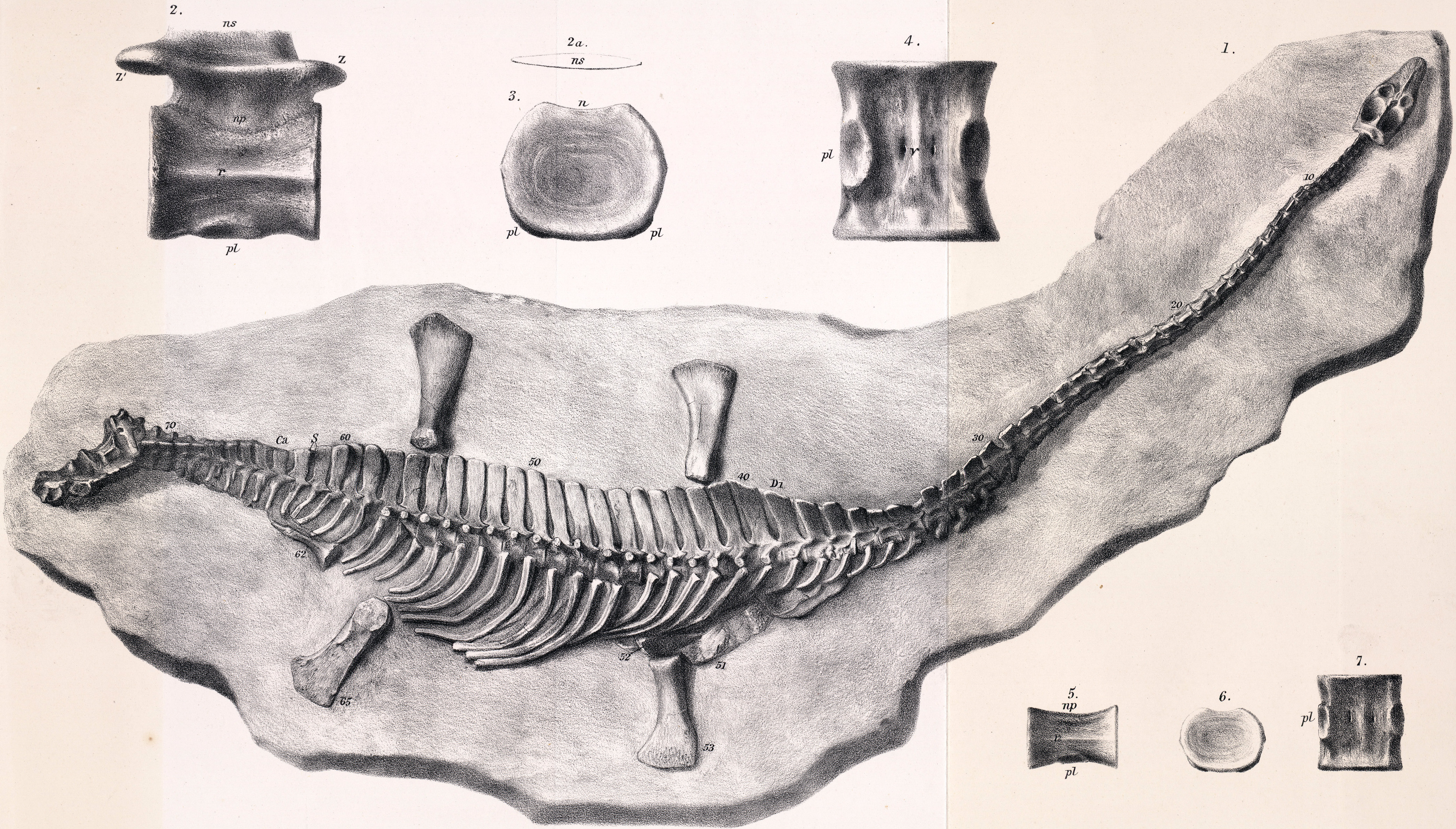

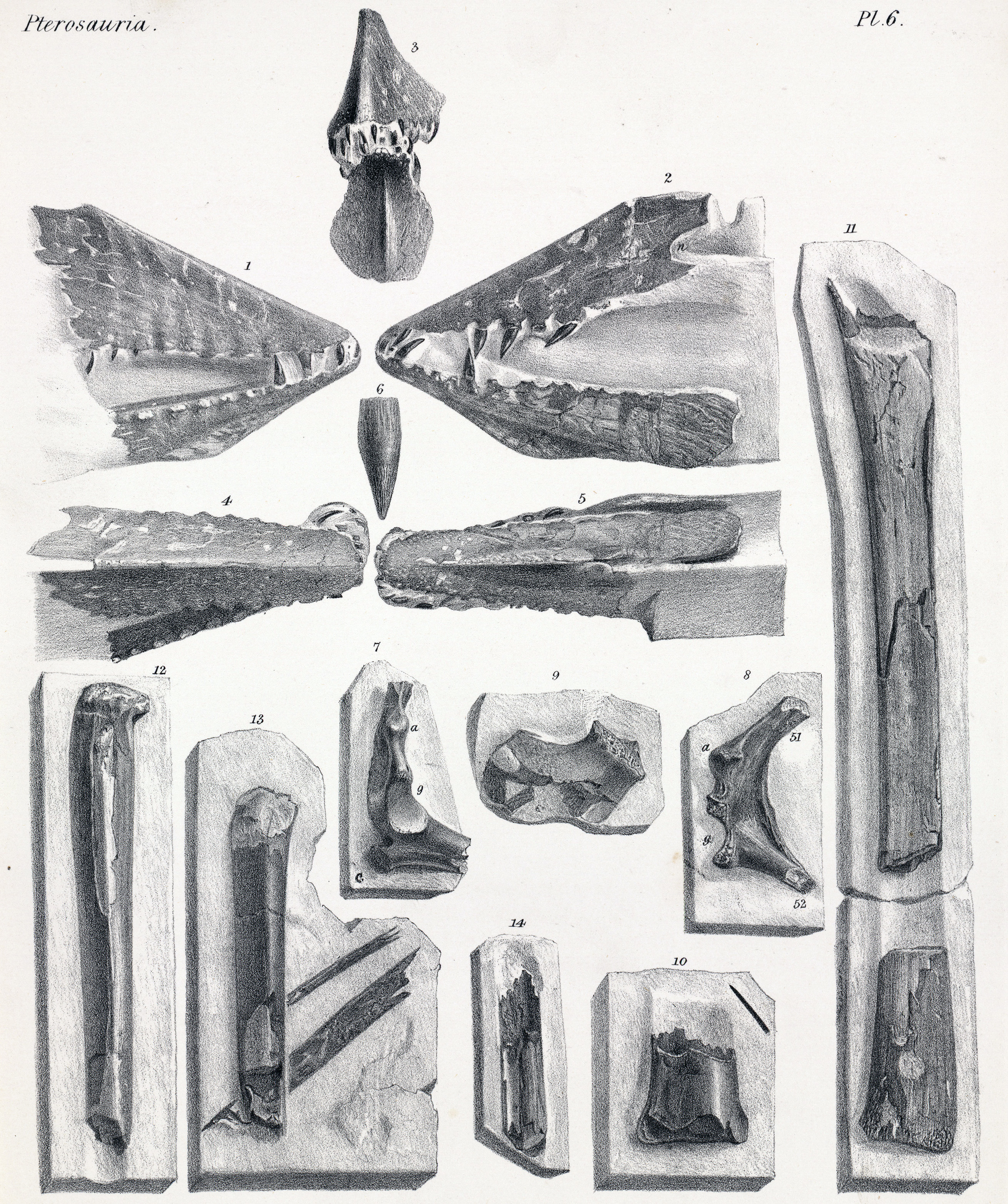

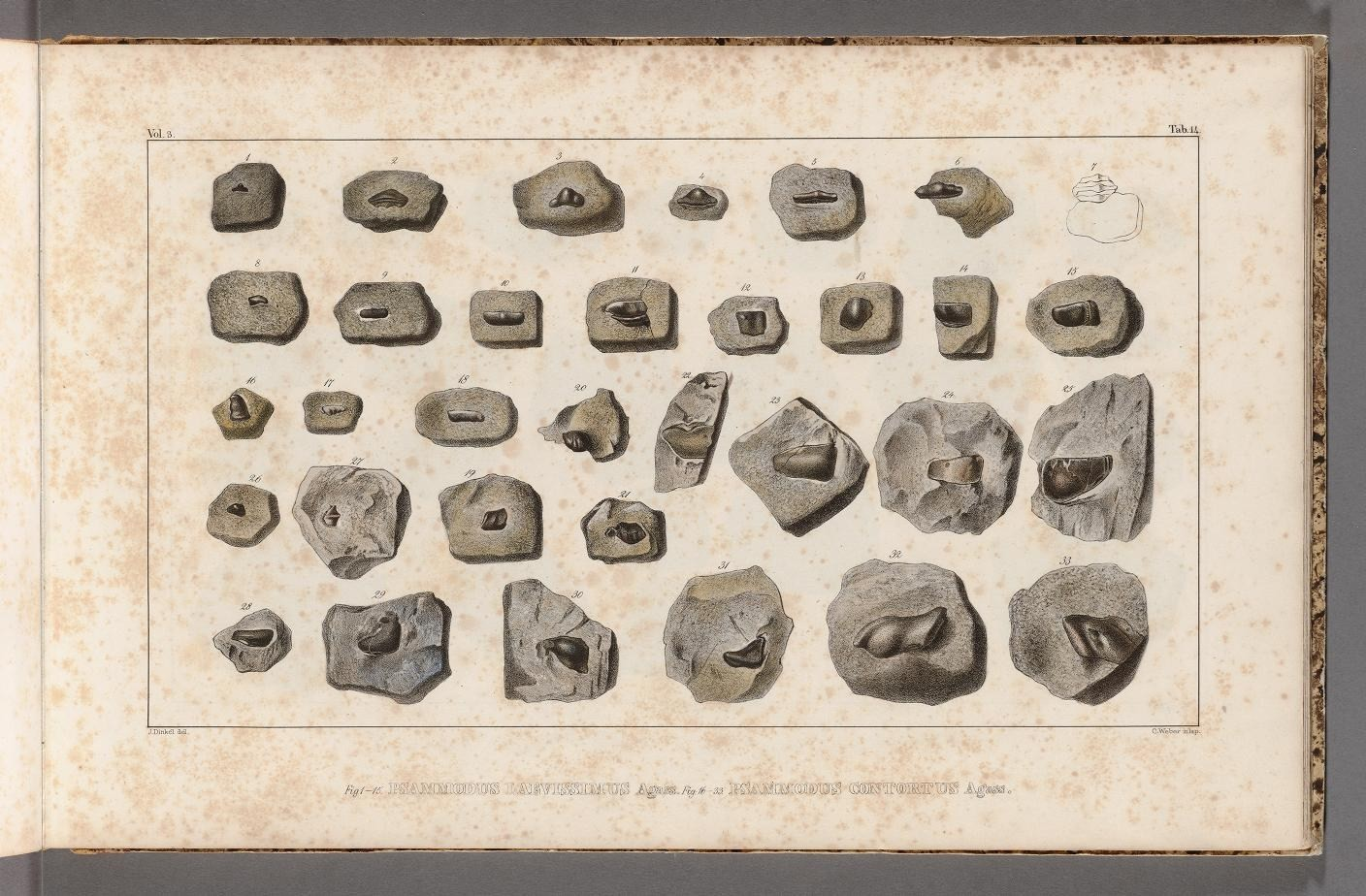

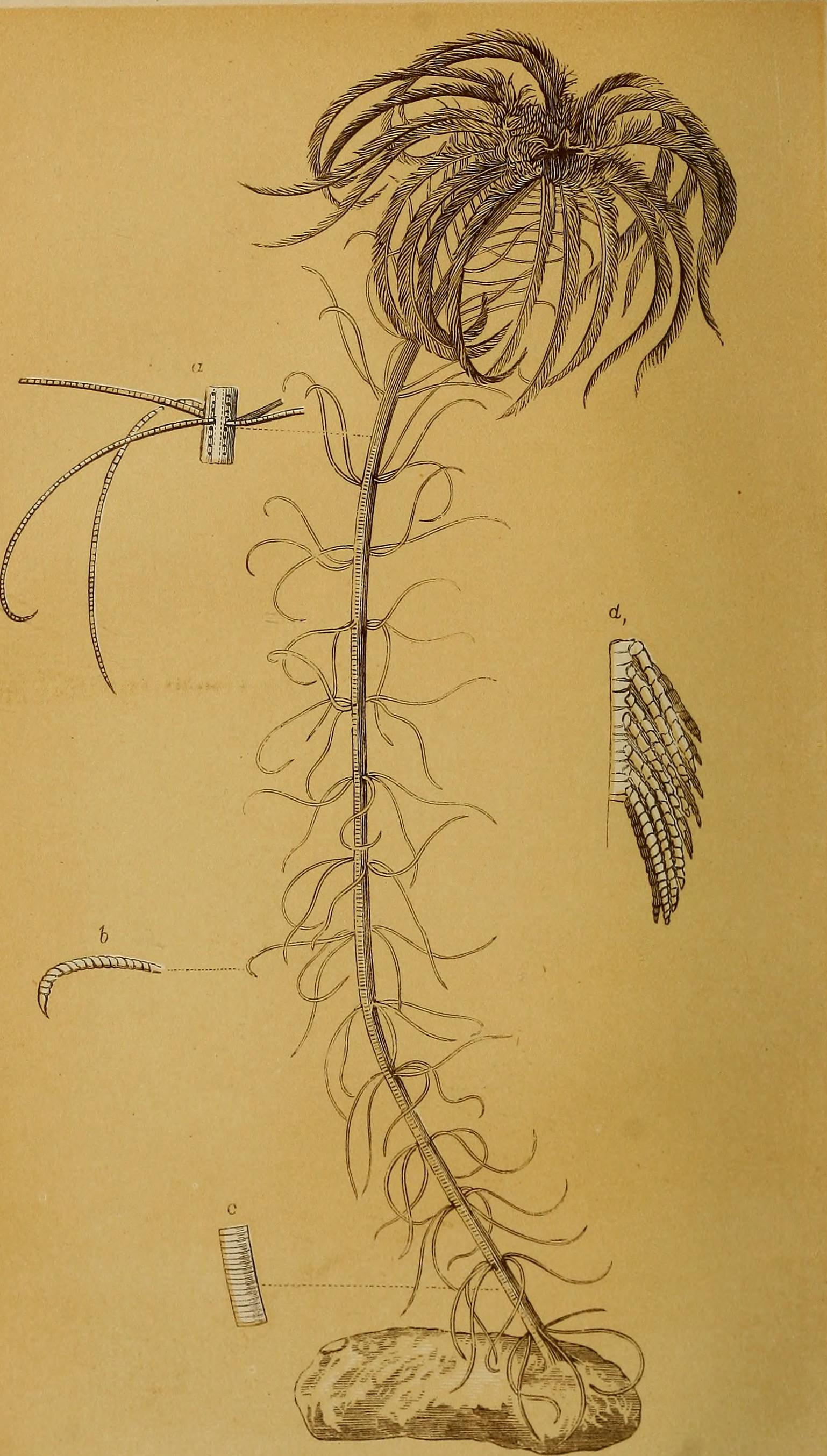

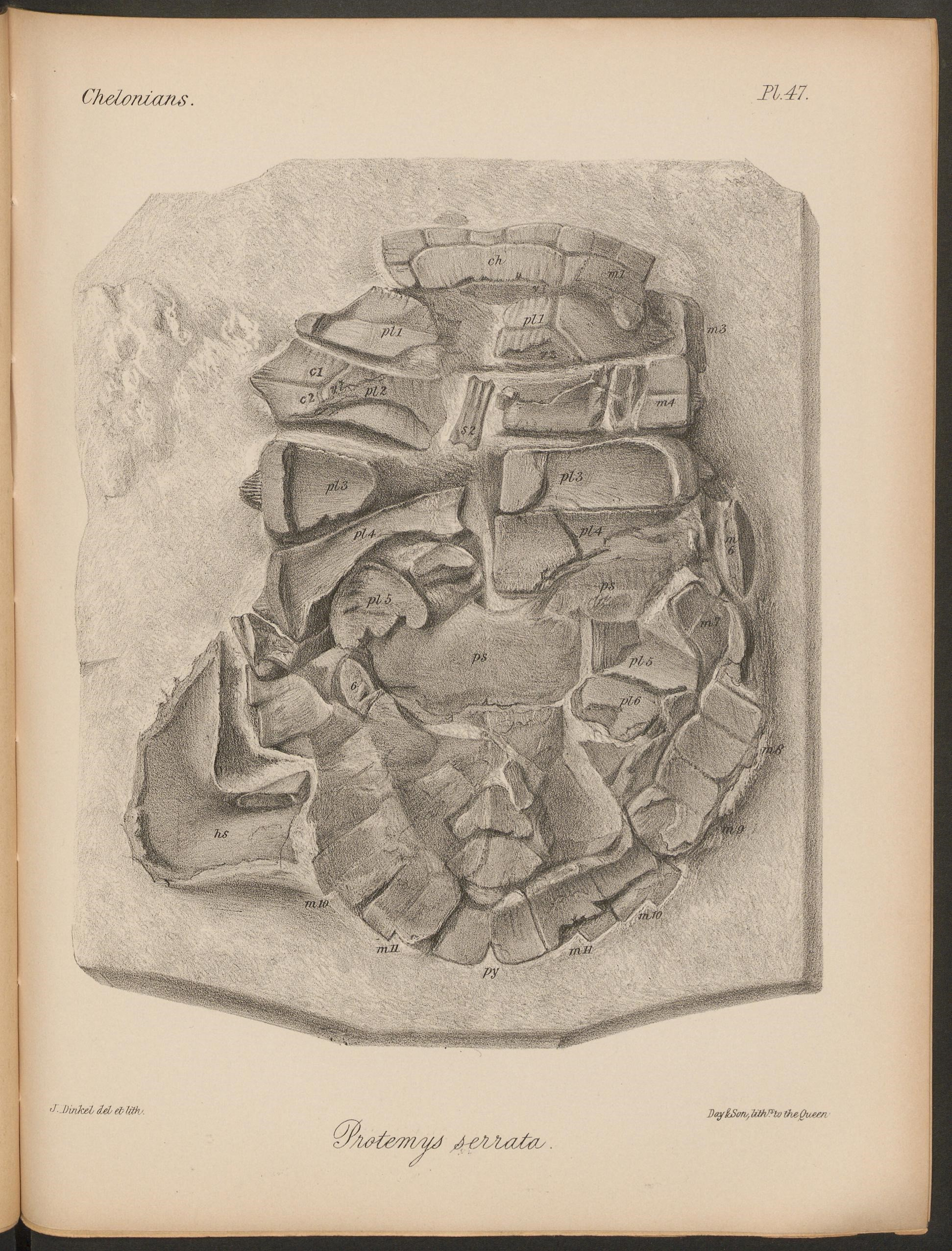

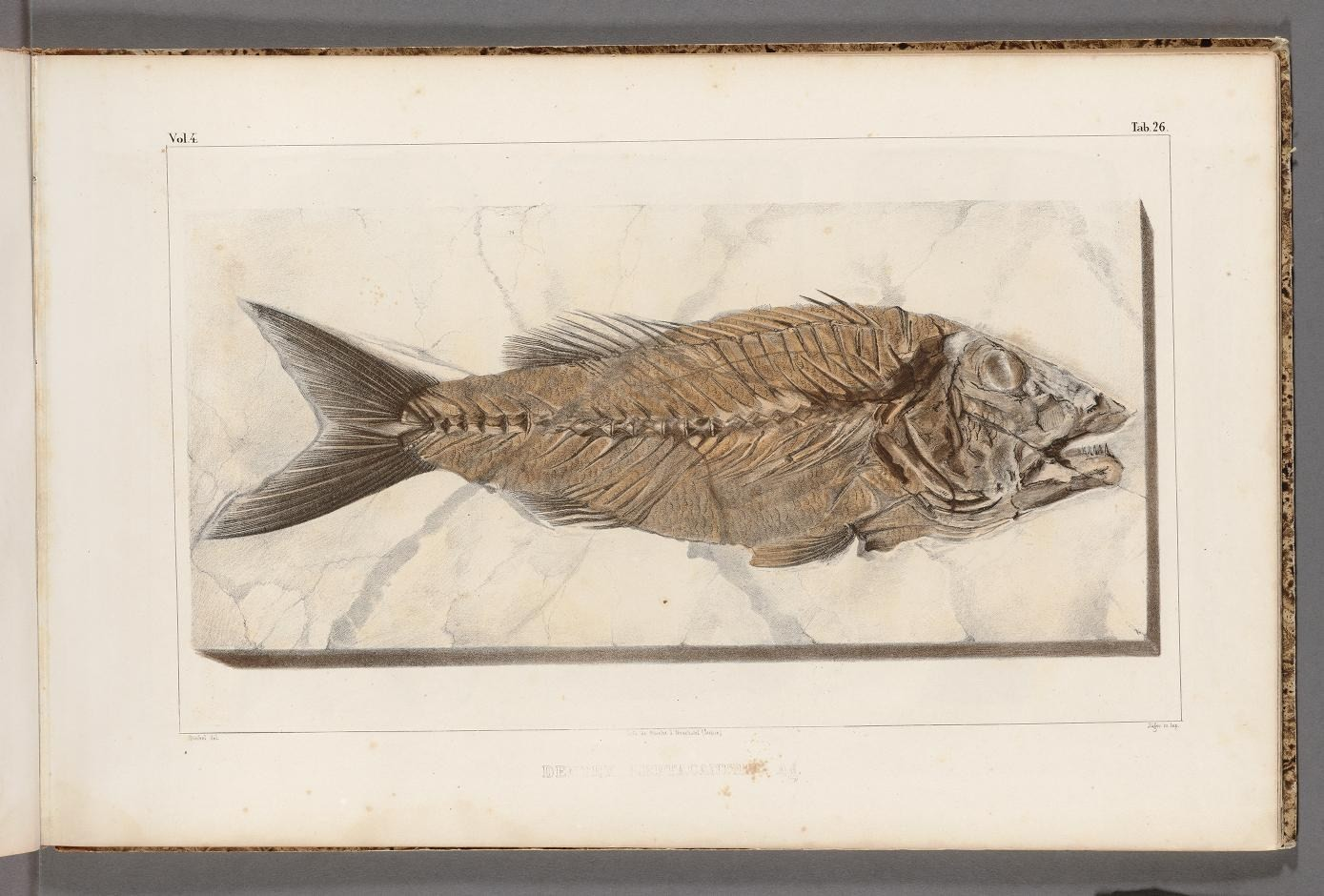

Joseph Dinkel (1806 – 1891) was an Austrian artist known for his illustrations of scientific specimens including for works by Louis Agassiz. He also did architectural and engineering drawing.

Dinkel studied at the Bavarian Academy of Fine Arts.

Agassiz met Dinkel in 1828 and they collaborated for more than 20 years, including travels together. Dinkel did illustrations of fish for Agassiz on the early trips. Dinkel also did engraved illustrations of specimens in museum and private collections for Agassiz.

Palaeontologist Richard Owen arranged for a lithograph by Dinkel of an Altispinax specimen.
