= Charles MacCarthy (British Army officer) =

British Army officer (1764–1824)

Brigadier-General Sir Charles MacCarthy KCMG
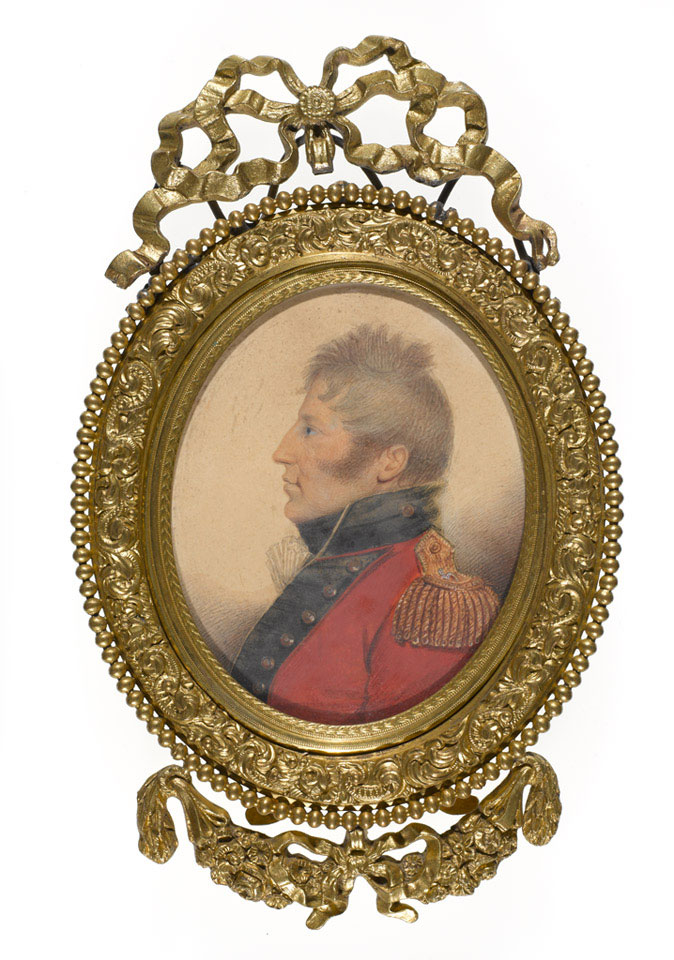
- c. 1812 portrait

Personal details
- Born: 15 February 1764 County Cork, Kingdom of Ireland
- Died: 21 January 1824 (aged 59) Gold Coast, West Africa

Military service
- Allegiance: United Kingdom
- Rank: Governor

Sir Charles MacCarthy, KCMG (born Charles Guérault; 15 February 1764 – 21 January 1824) was an Irish soldier of French and Irish descent, who later was appointed as British military governor to territories in West Africa, including Sierra Leone. His family had continued ties to France through the Irish Brigade. MacCarthy followed a maternal uncle into serving with royal French forces, Charles with units under émigré direction. He also served in the Dutch and British armies.

MacCarthy was appointed in 1812 by the British as military governor of former French territories Senegal and Gorée, after Napoleon was defeated in Russia and retreated with high losses. When the Napoleonic Wars ended, the United Kingdom returned these colonies to France in the Treaty of Paris in 1814, and MacCarthy was appointed governor of Sierra Leone. He was killed by Ashanti forces in the battle of Nsamankow, with his skull used as a trophy of war.

== Early and personal life ==
Charles Guérault was born in 1764 in County Cork in Ireland, the son of French émigré Jean Gabriel Guérault, formerly Procureur de Roi (Crown prosecutor), and his Irish wife Yvette Parra (MacCarthy) (also recorded as Charlotte Michelle McCarthy). As a young man, Charles changed his name at an early age to MacCarthy, his mother's maiden name, on the advice of his uncle Thaddeus MacCarthy, then a colonel in the Life Guards of Louis XV. (In one history book, his name is recorded as "Charles McCarthy-Lyragh.") It was better for Charles not to be identified with his émigré father during the French Revolution and its aftermath. The uncle later served as a captain in the 9th Regiment of Foot.

In 1812, MacCarthy at the age of 48 married Antoinette Carpot, a French woman, the year he was appointed as governor of two former French territories in Africa. They had one son, Charles. After the senior MacCarthy's death, his namesake son Charles was adopted by his uncle, the Comte de Mervé. The younger Charles MacCarthy succeeded to that title as a naturalised French citizen on his uncle's death.

== Military career ==
At the age of 21, in 1785, MacCarthy joined the Irish Brigade of the French army, as a sub-lieutenant in the Régiment de Berwick; by 1791 he had attained the rank of captain, and was serving with the émigré royalist army under Louis Joseph de Bourbon, prince de Condé in Germany. He later served with the army of the Dutch Republic as a volunteer, in Damas' Regiment, from 1793 to 1794. He was wounded in the leg during an action outside Louvain on 15 July 1794.

MacCarthy subsequently saw service in the Duc de Castries's Regiment of the émigré army, and when the Irish Brigade was reorganised in British pay in late 1794, he was appointed an ensign in the Regiment of Le Comte de Conway (the 6th Regiment of the Brigade). He served in the West Indies with the Regiment of Le Comte de Walsh-Serrant (the 2nd Regiment) from 1796 to 1798. Returning from Honduras on the transport HMS Calypso in June 1798 with the grenadier company of that regiment, MacCarthy was wounded whilst in a day-long action fighting off a French privateer. The Irish Brigade was disbanded as a whole in late 1798.

He received his first British commission on 17 October 1799, when he was appointed to command a company of the 11th West India Regiment, and transferred to a captaincy in the 52nd (Oxfordshire) Regiment of Foot on 15 March 1800. He was appointed a major in the New Brunswick Fencible Infantry (later the 104th Foot) on 14 April 1804 and remained with them until 1811, when at the age of about 57, he received a lieutenant-colonelcy in the Royal African Corps.

== West African governor ==
In 1812 MacCarthy was appointed the Governor of Senegal and Gorée, which the British had acquired following Napoleon's defeat in Russia. When these territories were returned to France by the Treaty of Paris, MacCarthy was appointed in 1814 as the Governor of Sierra Leone. This was the colony established by the British in West Africa in the late eighteenth century for the resettlement of Black Loyalists from North America and London after the Revolutionary War. They also deported maroons from Jamaica to here, and resettled slaves liberated from illegal slave ships after Britain and the United States prohibited the Atlantic slave trade.

As governor, MacCarthy took a strong interest in the welfare of the colony, actively encouraging the building of housing and schools for the settlers. He was a correspondent of William Wilberforce, and founded many settlements for liberated slaves. In addition, he arranged for the support and education of native children whose parents had been captured by slavers, in schools run by the Church Missionary Society. As a result of this involvement, he campaigned for the complete suppression of the slave trade. Whilst the slave trade was abolished in the United Kingdom and its territories, and the United States had banned the Atlantic slave trade for its citizens from 1808, Portugal and Spain still supported the slave trade in West African waters, and in their Central and South American colonies, using ships nominally flagged in countries which had not yet abolished it.

In 1818, MacCarthy signed a treaty with Mangé Demba, according to which the Îles de Los (off the coast of Guinea) were ceded to the British in exchange for an annual rent.

MacCarthy was knighted on 21 November 1820, and on 19 July 1821 was promoted to the rank of colonel with the temporary rank of brigadier-general in West Africa.

After the African Company of Merchants was abolished in 1821, for its failure to suppress the slave trade efficiently, Great Britain took on the Gold Coast as a crown colony. It was placed under the government of Sierra Leone, and MacCarthy became the governor of both. MacCarthy Island in the Gambia was named in his honour whilst governor.

== Death during the Battle of Nsamankow ==
In late 1823, following the disagreements between the Fante and the Ashanti, MacCarthy declared war on the king of the Ashanti. After organising the defences of Cape Coast, he set out with an expedition of some 80 men of the Royal African Colonial Corps (RACC), 170 men of the Cape Coast Militia, and 240 Fanti tribesmen under their local chiefs. He was accompanied by a captain and an ensign of the 2nd West India Regiment, as aides-de-camp, a surgeon of the same regiment, and J. T. Williams, his colonial secretary. In addition, he drew on three other groups of infantry that were in the region: one of 600 regulars of the RACC and 3,000 native levies, one of 100 regulars and militia and 2,000 levies (under Major Alexander Gordon Laing), and a third of 300 regulars and militia and 6,000 levies. The plan was for the four groups to converge and engage the enemy with overwhelming force.

On the night of the 20th, still without having joined forces with the other three groups, his force camped by a tributary of the Pra River. The next day, at around 2pm, they encountered a large enemy force of around 10,000 men; in the belief that the Ashanti army contained several disaffected groups whose chiefs were willing to defect, MacCarthy instructed the band to play the British National Anthem loudly. The Ashanti responded by approaching closer, beating war drums, and his beliefs were swiftly dispelled.

Fighting started shortly thereafter; the two sides were separated by a 60-foot-wide (18 m) stream, which the Ashanti made no major attempt to ford, both sides held their lines and kept up a continual musket fire. However, the British forces were lightly supplied; the bearers bringing the supplies up in the rear, which included most of the gunpowder and ammunition, mostly fled after hearing the firing in the distance and encountering deserters straggling back. Only one additional barrel of powder and one of shot were brought up, and ammunition ran out around 4pm; the Ashanti made a determined attempt to cross the river, and quickly broke into the camp.

Almost all the British force were killed immediately; only around 20 managed to escape. MacCarthy, along with the ensign and his secretary, attempted to fall back but was wounded by gunfire and killed by a second shot shortly thereafter. Ensign Wetherell was killed whilst trying to defend MacCarthy's body and Williams taken prisoner. On his return, he related that he had survived only by being recognised by an Ashanti chief for whom he had done a small favour, and was spared. Williams was held prisoner for several months, locked in a hut which he shared with the severed heads of MacCarthy and Wetherell, kept as trophies of war. McCarthy's gold-rimmed skull was later used as a drinking-cup by the Ashanti rulers. MacCarthy was succeeded as governor by military officer Charles Turner.

== See also ==
- British West Africa
- British Empire
- Scramble for Africa
