= Baie de Sangareya =

Body of water

Sangareya Bay
- Baie de Sangareya (French)
- Location in Guinea
- Coordinates: 9°38′N 13°45′W
- Ocean/sea sources: Atlantic Ocean
- Basin countries: Guinea
- Max. length: 15 km (9.3 mi)
- Max. width: 27 km (17 mi)
- Islands: Banana Islands
- Settlements: Conakry

Sangareya Bay (French: Baie de Sangareya) is a bay in the coast of Guinea on the Atlantic Ocean.

== Geography ==
The Sangareya Bay opens to the west and is located just to the north of Conakry. The Los Islands (Îles de Los) are located about 2 km off the headland limiting the bay on its southern side.

== See also ==
- Îles de Los
