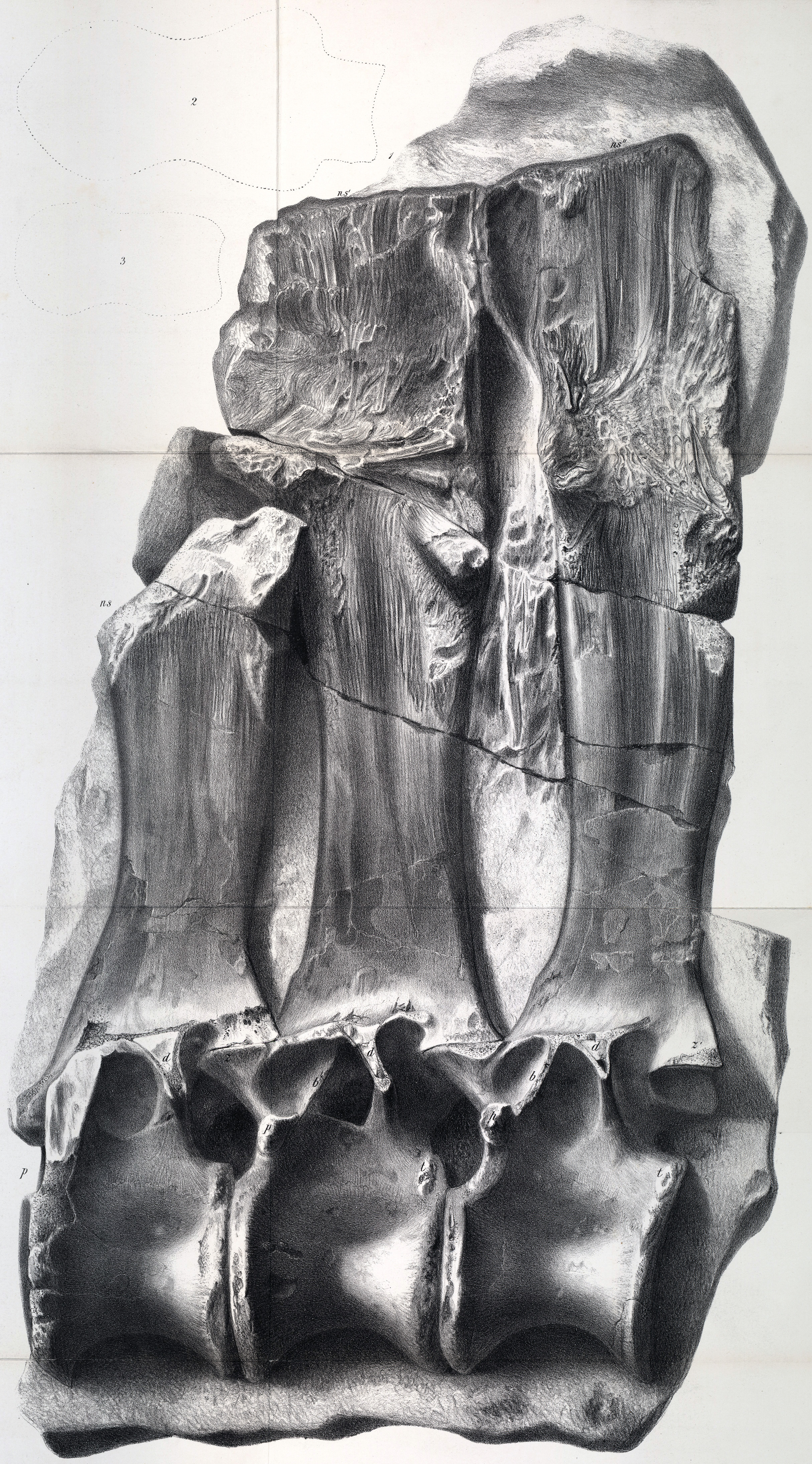
- Holotype (NHMUK R1828) illustrated c. 1850s

Scientific classification
- Kingdom: Animalia
- Phylum: Chordata
- Class: Reptilia
- Clade: Dinosauria
- Clade: Saurischia
- Clade: Theropoda
- Clade: †Carnosauria
- Genus: †Altispinax von Huene, 1923
- Species: †A. dunkeri

Binomial name
- †Altispinax dunkeri von Huene, 1923

Synonyms
- Megalosaurus dunkeri? Dames, 1884; Acrocanthosaurus altispinax Paul, 1988; Altispinax "lydekkerhueneorum" Pickering, 1995; Becklespinax altispinax (Paul, 1988) Olshevsky, 1991; Altispinax altispinax (Paul, 1988) Rauhut, 2000

= Altispinax =

Altispinax Temporal range: Early Cretaceous, (Berriasian - Valanginian) 140–133 Ma

Genus of dinosaurs (fossil)

Altispinax (/ˌæltɪˈspaɪnæks/; "with high spines") is a genus of large predatory theropod dinosaur from the Early Cretaceous period (Berriasian - Valanginian, 140 to 133 million years ago) of what is now the Wadhurst Clay Formation of East Sussex, England.

== History ==
Probably during the early 1850s, fossil collector Samuel Husbands Beckles discovered some nodules with dinosaur bones in a quarry near Battle, East Sussex. These he sent to palaeontologist Richard Owen, who reported them in 1856. Owen had a lithograph made by Joseph Dinkel of the main specimen, a series of three back vertebrae with very tall spines, whose image was also shown in an 1884 edition of an 1855 volume of his standard work on British fossil reptiles, leading to the misunderstanding the fossils had been recovered close to 1884. Owen, who referred the specimens to Megalosaurus bucklandii, thought the vertebrae were part of the shoulder region and it has been assumed that he must have already known of the find in 1853 as he directed Benjamin Waterhouse Hawkins to put a hump on the back of his life-sized Megalosaurus sculpture in Crystal Palace Park, which again inspired other restorations from the 19th century.

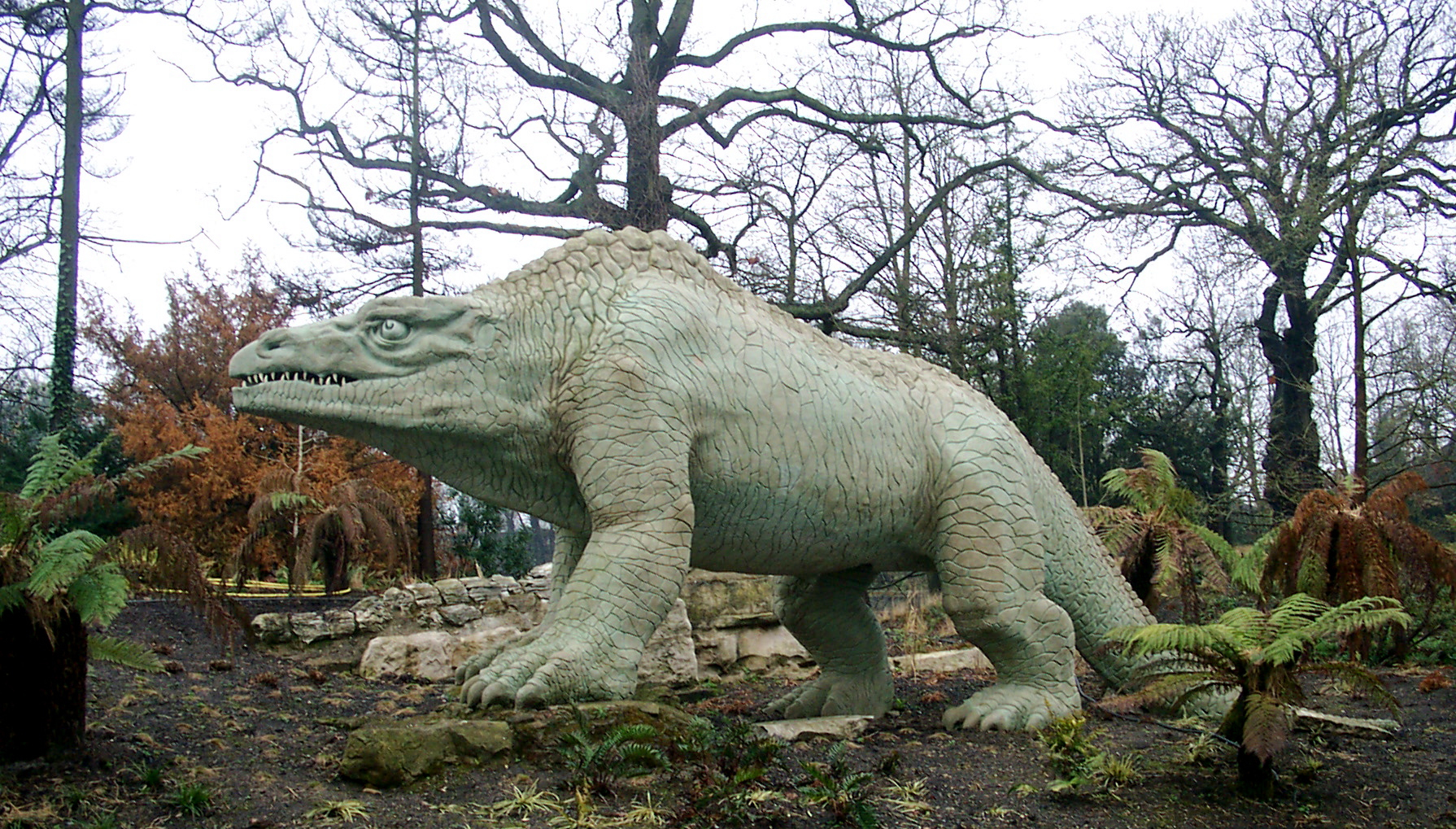
The humped Megalosaurus in Crystal Palace Park, London.

The fossil, now catalogued as NHMUK PV R 1828, was probably found in a layer of the Hastings Bed Group dating from the late Valanginian age. It consists of a series of three posterior dorsal vertebrae. Owen also reported the presence in the nodules of two right ribs and two additional series of two dorsal vertebral centra each. Olshevsky thought the holotype represented the eighth, ninth, and tenth dorsal vertebrae; later researchers, however, have assumed them to be the tenth, eleventh and twelfth.

In 1888, Richard Lydekker compared these vertebrae with material referred to Megalosaurus dunkeri, a Cretaceous species represented by a single tooth found in Germany. In 1923 Friedrich von Huene created a separate genus for Megalosaurus dunkeri. He used the three vertebrae as the basis for this genus, noting that they were different from Megalosaurus, and created the name Altispinax (meaning "with high spines") based on their appearance. Many later researchers concluded that Megalosaurus dunkeri had therefore received a new genus name as Altispinax dunkeri, a combination actually used for the first time in 1939 by Oskar Kuhn.

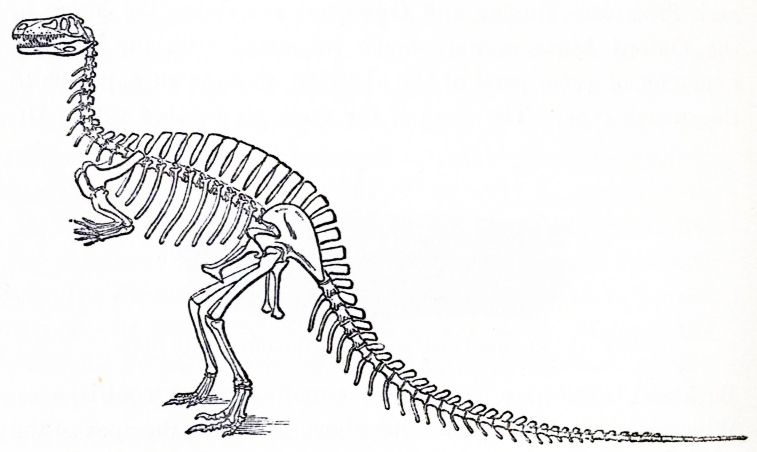
Von Meyer's restoration of Megalosaurus with long neural spines

Later researchers considered Altispinax a nomen dubium because the single tooth was undiagnostic. No relationship could be proven between the tooth and the vertebrae. The vertebrae were therefore given a new name in 1988 by Gregory Paul. Paul considered them to represent a possible new species of Acrocanthosaurus, which he named Acrocanthosaurus? altispinax. The specific name was deliberately made identical to the old generic name, to emphasize that both referred to the vertebrae. As indicated by the question mark, Paul himself was uncertain about this assignment. For this reason, in 1991 a new genus, Becklespinax, was named for the vertebrae by George Olshevsky, in honour of the original discoverer, Beckles. The new combination name of the type species Acrocanthosaurus? altispinax thus became Becklespinax altispinax. The species names Altispinax altispinax and Altispinax lydekkerhueneorum are its junior objective synonyms. In 2016, a re-examination of this convoluted history of classification was published by Michael Maisch. Maisch concluded that von Huene, when he named Altispinax dunkeri, deliberately based the species on the vertebrae and not on the Megalosaurus dunkeri tooth. Because both species were based on different type specimens, later researchers were wrong to consider them the same species. Rather, according to Maisch's interpretation of the rules of the ICZN, Altispinax dunkeri (based on the tall-spined vertebrae) and Megalosaurus dunkeri (based on the tooth from Germany) are two distinct species that happen to share the same species name. Because the later names created by Paul and Olshevsky were based on the same vertebrae used by von Huene to name Altispinax dunkeri, all of those later names must be considered junior objective synonyms (different names for exactly the same fossil), and Altispinax dunkeri, having been named first, has priority as the correct name for this species.

=== Other species ===
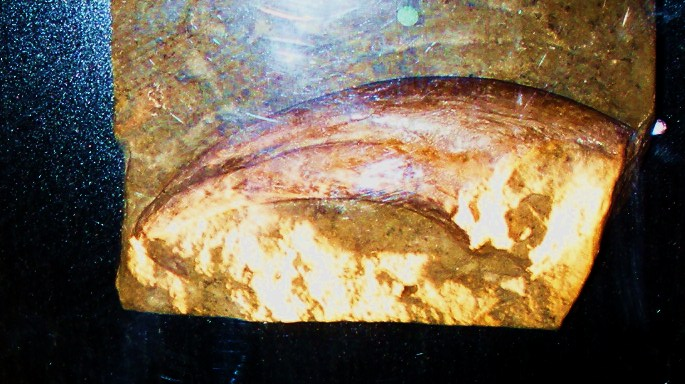
Foot claw (specimen BMNH 2482) provisionally referred to Altispinax by von Huene in 1926. Natural History Museum, London.

Four other species would be named within the genus Altispinax. In 1923 von Huene renamed Megalosaurus oweni Lydekker 1889, based on the metatarsus BMNH R2559, into Altispinax oweni. In 1991 Olshevsky created a separate genus Valdoraptor for this species. In 1932 von Huene renamed Megalosaurus parkeri Huene 1923 into Altispinax parkeri. This species in 1964 was given the separate generic name Metriacanthosaurus.

== Description ==
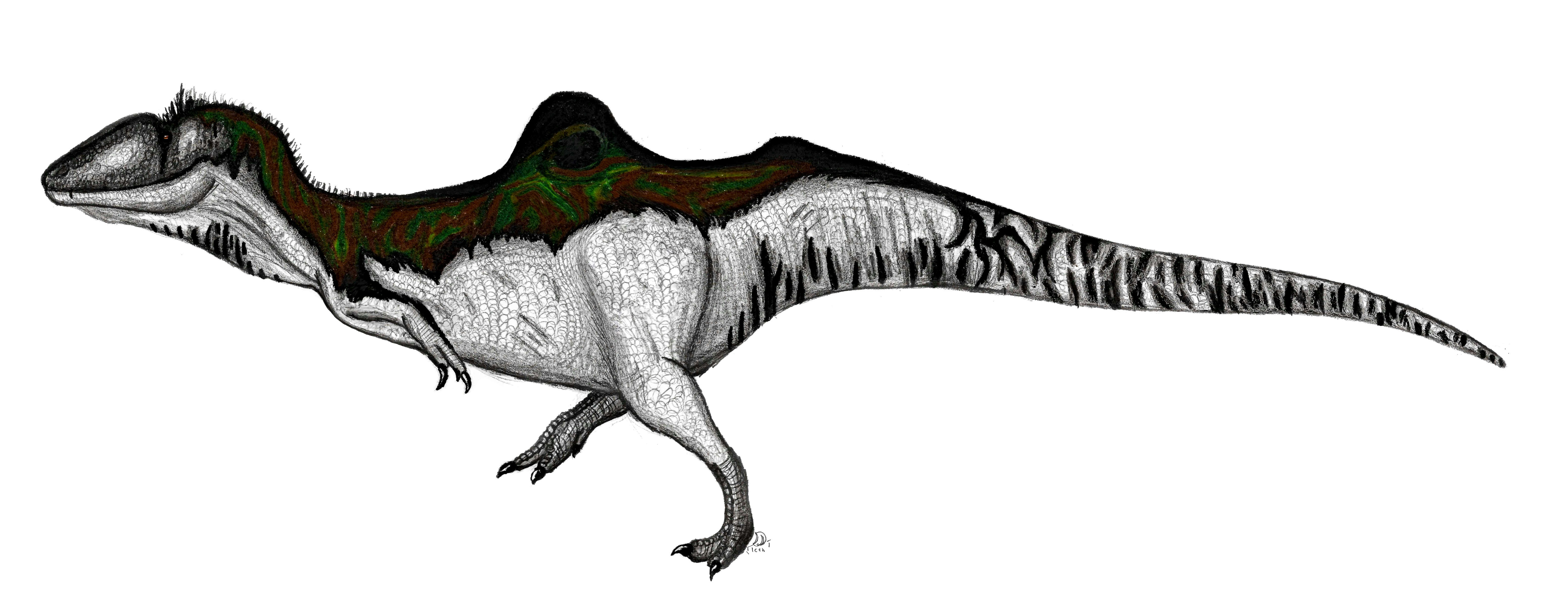
Altispinax reconstructed after Concavenator, based on Darren Naish's blog post.

Paul in 1988 tentatively estimated that Altispinax weighed 1 tonne (1.1 short tons) and was shorter than the type specimen of Acrocanthosaurus atokensis which measures about 8 meters (26 ft) long.

The three A. dunkeri back vertebrae from Sussex have about thirty-five centimetres high neural spines or processus spinosi, about as relatively tall as those of Ichthyovenator. These show irregular rugosities on the upper third part. According to Ralph Molnar the two spines closest to the skull are ankylosed or fused. The single closest spine is only about two-thirds the height of the others and looks as it has broken off, while the spine behind partly overgrows the gap. This Molnar explained as a result of injury to a back frill, the wound later closing from behind. In 2003, Darren Naish gave a different interpretation, suggesting the gap was natural. He denied that the front two vertebrae were ankylosed but observed that the spines of eleventh and twelfth vertebrae were joined at the top. The spines are also transversely expanded above, with a width of about fifty-five millimetres. Naish also pointed out that Owen had noted the large depressions on the neural arch sides and had explained them as a result of pneumatisation, the first time this phenomenon would explicitly have been observed with a dinosaur. In 2006 however, it was reported that in 1837 Christian Erich Hermann von Meyer already had commented on this phenomenon with the Saurischia in general. The discovery of a back crest incorporating only two high vertebrae in Concavenator, in 2010 provided corroboration that the short anterior Altispinax spine may be complete.

Olshevsky originally assigned Altispinax to the Eustreptospondylidae. In 2003 Naish considered it a member of the Allosauroidea. Most researchers give a less precise placement as Tetanurae incertae sedis.
