= William Henry Leigh (merchant) =

British colonial official and slave trader (1781 - 1818)

- Born: 1781
- Died: 1818 (37 years old); Iles de Los
- Occupation(s): Merchant, slave trader and colonial official
- Known for: British court case related to his estate

William Henry Leigh (1781–1818) was a British merchant, slave trader and former colonial official in Sierra Leone during the early nineteenth century.

== Early life and background ==
William Henry Leigh was an official employee of the Sierra Leone Company and served the company in the early 1800s. Leigh eventually settled in the Îles de Los and was a wealthy smuggler of American goods. Leigh also engaged in the slave trade and was a colleague of Samuel Samo, a Dutch slave trader.

== Death ==
William Henry Leigh died in 1818 at the Isles de Los at the age of 37 years old. Leigh left a will in which he provided for his several children which was disputed in the English courts in the early nineteenth century.

== Leigh v Macaulay ==
The case of Leigh v Macaulay (20 February 1835) in which James Leigh, a son of William Henry Leigh, brought an action against Zachary Macaulay was a case in relation to equity and trusts and specifically to the estate of William Henry Leigh. James Leigh was represented by Mr. Simpkinson and the case reached the court of the Lord Chief Baron.

Kenneth Macaulay, the executor of William Leigh's estate died indebted to Macaulay and Babington and this mercantile firm used the monies received from the goods from William Leigh's estate sent by Kenneth Macaulay towards the clearance of Kenneth Macaulay's debt. Macaulay and Babington also mixed the produce received from Kenneth Macaulay for their business with the produce sent by Kenneth Macaulay to be realised for William Henry Leigh's estate. It was ruled by the courts that Macaulay and Babington owed James Leigh the amount due from the proceeds of the estate and it was held that the money should be paid into court.

== Descendants ==
William Henry Leigh had several children with his Nova Scotian Settler mistress and among his descendants are Leslie William Leigh and John Ernest Leigh, the former Sierra Leonean ambassador to the United States.

== Sources ==
- Analytical Digest of Cases Published in the Law Journal Reports, Volume 4
- The Law Journal Reports, Volume 4
- Reports of Cases Argued and Determined in the Court of Exchequer in Equity [1834-1842], Volume 1
- The English Reports, Volume 4; Volume 160
- The Slavery Reader, Volume 1
- West African Culture Dynamics: Archaeological and Historical Perspectives
- The Slave Trade
