= Île Tamara Lighthouse =

Lighthouse in Guinea

Île Tamara lighthouse
- Location: Îles de Los, Conakry; Guinea
- Coordinates: 9°27′29″N 13°50′01″W

Tower
- Constructed: 1906
- Construction: masonry tower
- Height: 10 metres (33 ft)
- Shape: cylindrical tower with balcony and lantern
- Markings: white tower, red balcony and lantern

Light
- Focal height: 95 metres (312 ft)
- Range: 26 nautical miles (48 km; 30 mi)
- Characteristic: Fl W 5s.

The Île Tamara Lighthouse is a lighthouse in Guinea. It was constructed on Île Tamara, outermost of the Îles de Los, in 1906, and has been active since that time. It serves as the landfall light for Conakry. The lighthouse tower itself is only 33 feet (10 m) tall; however, as it was constructed on top of a large boulder, its focal plane is considerably higher, at 311 feet (95 m).
