= George Warren (missionary) =

British Methodist missionary

George Warren was a British Methodist missionary. He was the first Wesleyan Methodist in Africa and went to Sierra Leone in Nov 1811.

Rev. Warren had been an itinerant preacher travelling through England and Wales for John Wesley's circuits. Warren volunteered to become a missionary and educationalist in Sierra Leone, and sailed there in 1811 on board the Traveller, captained by Paul Cuffee. He was accompanied by three school teachers: Jonathan Raynor, John Healey and Thomas Hirst.

He was a juror during the trial of Samuel Samo in 1812.

He died on 26 July 1812, within 8 months of arriving, a victim of the climate. (See Ref 1)

Today there is a Methodist Church in Freetown named Warren Memorial Methodist Church.
