= Samuel Samo =

Dutch slave trader

- Conviction: feloniously dealing in slaves under the Slave Trade Felony Act 1811
- Penalty: pardoned

Samuel Samo was a Dutch slave trader who was the first person to be prosecuted under the British Slave Trade Felony Act 1811.

Samuel Samo was the uncle of John Samo, a Dutch shopkeeper who served as King's Advocate and Member of His Majesty's Colonial Council of Sierra Leone. Samo was also a colleague of William Henry Leigh. On one voyage, 500 Africans died.

Samo was based in the Îles de Los, a group of islands off Conakry in modern-day Guinea. He was seized along with Charles Hickson from there in early 1812 and taken to Freetown, Sierra Leone, to be put on trial.

The trial was held under the auspices of the Vice admiralty court in Sierra Leone. Robert Thorpe was the presiding judge. Samo was charged with five counts of slave-trading between August 1811 and January 1812. Samo was convicted but given a royal pardon by Governor Charles William Maxwell. The convict was enjoined to never again engage in slave trading. Two other slave traders were convicted in Sierra Leone between April and June 1812. William Tufft was sentenced to three years of hard labour, and Joseph Peters was sentenced to 7 years of transportation.

== See also ==
- George Warren (missionary)
