= Megalosaurus dunkeri =

Megalosaurus dunkeri Temporal range: Early Cretaceous, Valanginian

Scientific classification
- Kingdom: Animalia
- Phylum: Chordata
- Class: Reptilia
- Clade: Dinosauria
- Clade: Saurischia
- Clade: Theropoda
- Family: †Megalosauridae
- Subfamily: †Megalosaurinae
- Genus: †Megalosaurus
- Species: †M. dunkeri

Binomial name
- †Megalosaurus dunkeri Dames, 1884

Synonyms
- Altispinax dunkeri? von Huene, 1923

Extinct species of dinosaur

"Megalosaurus" dunkeri is a dubious species of theropod dinosaur, known only from a single tooth.

== History ==
"M." dunkeri was originally named and described by Wilhelm Dames on 16 December 1884 during a lecture. A synopsis of the lecture was actually published in 1885, but because this was in the form of an 1884 yearbook, the latter date is usually given. However, some sources indicate 1887 as the year of publication and designate the species as a "Megalosaurus" dunkeri Dames vide Koken 1887, because in that year, the type specimen, a single tooth, was again described and also illustrated in a publication by Ernst Koken. The specific name honours paleontologist Wilhelm Dunker, who, many years earlier, had discovered the tooth on the Deister, in the main coal seam of Obernkirchen. This holotype had been, under the inventory number UM 84, added by him to the collection of the University of Marburg.

In 1888, Richard Lydekker assigned many fragmentary specimens from the Early Cretaceous of England which had been referred to Megalosaurus in the literature to "Megalosaurus" dunkeri, which thus generally came to be understood as a European Early Cretaceous theropod. (One putative "M." dunkeri specimen from the Wadhurst Clay Formation, however, was later made the holotype of the new species Megalosaurus oweni in 1889.) In 1923, Friedrich von Huene created the name Altispinax dunkeri for NHMUK R1828, a series of three dorsal vertebrae with very high neural spines. The generic name is derived from Latin "altus" meaning "high" and Neo-Latin "spinax". Oskar Kuhn mistakenly listed "Megalosaurus dunkeri" as the type species of Altispinax in 1939, unaware that von Huene erected Altispinax dunkeri by deliberate use of misidentification.

In a 2016 study Michael W. Maisch considered Altispinax dunkeri to be a valid taxon. The author claimed that von Huene (1923) did not erect the genus Altispinax as a new genus for "Megalosaurus" dunkeri Dames (1884); rather, von Huene erected a new species Altispinax dunkeri by a deliberate use of misidentification in accordance with the article 11.10 of the International Code of Zoological Nomenclature. According to Maisch, the original description of A. dunkeri was in fact not based on the holotype specimen of "Megalosaurus" dunkeri, but on diagnostic material, i.e. three articulated vertebrae from the Wealden of East Sussex - the same specimen which subsequently was made the type specimen of Becklespinax altispinax. Maisch considered Becklespinax to be an objective junior synonym of Altispinax, and Becklespinax altispinax to be an objective junior synonym of Altispinax dunkeri von Huene (1923).

The "Megalosaurus" dunkeri holotype tooth consists of a crown with a length of six centimetres and a base length of twenty-two millimetres. It is moderately recurved with serrations on its back edge running all the way to the base. Dames concluded that there were two traits in which the tooth of "M." dunkeri differed from that of M. bucklandii: the lack of serrations on the front edge and the flatter cross-section. However, already Lydekker pointed out that the serrations could have been worn off, and the greater flatness could have been caused by a compression of the fossil.

A number of teeth from the Weald Clay of southeastern England identified as "M." dunkeri by Lydekker appear to be related to "Megalosaurus" pannoniensis from the early Campanian Grünbach Formation of Austria, and similar teeth from the Santonian Csehbánya Formation of Hungary.
