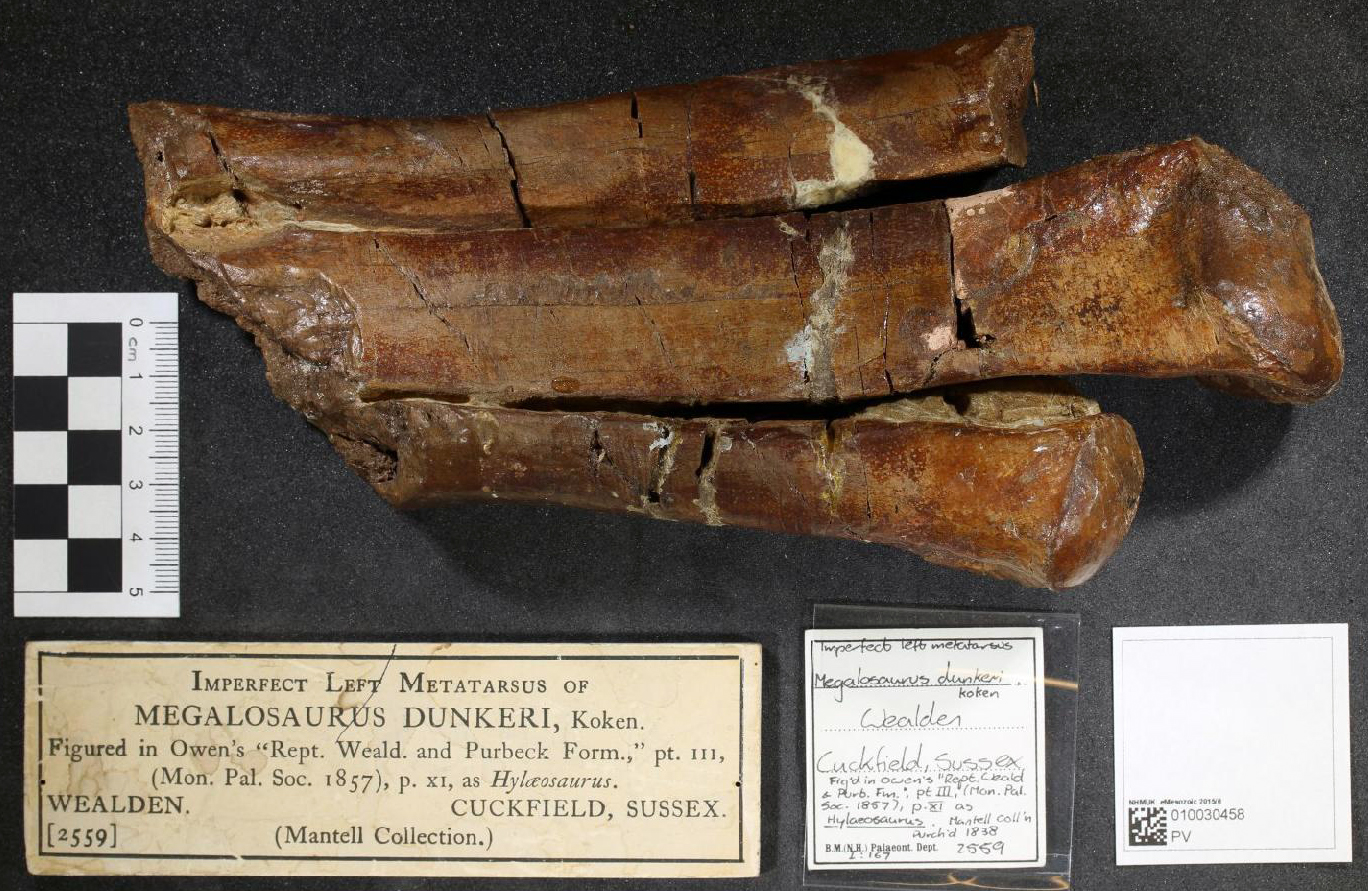
- Holotype left metatarsus

Scientific classification
- Kingdom: Animalia
- Phylum: Chordata
- Class: Reptilia
- Clade: Dinosauria
- Clade: Saurischia
- Clade: Theropoda
- Clade: †Ornithomimosauria
- Genus: †Valdoraptor; Olshevsky, 1991

Type species
- †Valdoraptor oweni (Lydekker, 1889)

Synonyms
- Altispinax oweni von Huene, 1923; Hylaeosaurus sp. Owen, 1858; Megalosaurus oweni Lydekker, 1889

= Valdoraptor =

Valdoraptor Temporal range: Early Cretaceous, 136 Ma

Extinct genus of dinosaurs

Valdoraptor (meaning "Wealden plunderer") is a genus of ornithomimosaurian theropod dinosaur from the Early Cretaceous of England. It is known only from bones of the feet. The holotype, BMNH R2559 (incorrectly given by Owen as BMNH R2556), was found near Cuckfield in layers of the Tunbridge Wells Sand Formation dating from the late Valanginian. The specimen is damaged, lacking parts of the upper and lower ends. It has a conserved length of 21.5 centimetres (8.5 in) and an estimated total length of 24 centimetres (9.4 in). This genus is paleontologically significant for being the first ornithomimosaur specimen known from England and represents the earliest record of ornithomimosaurs.

== Discovery ==
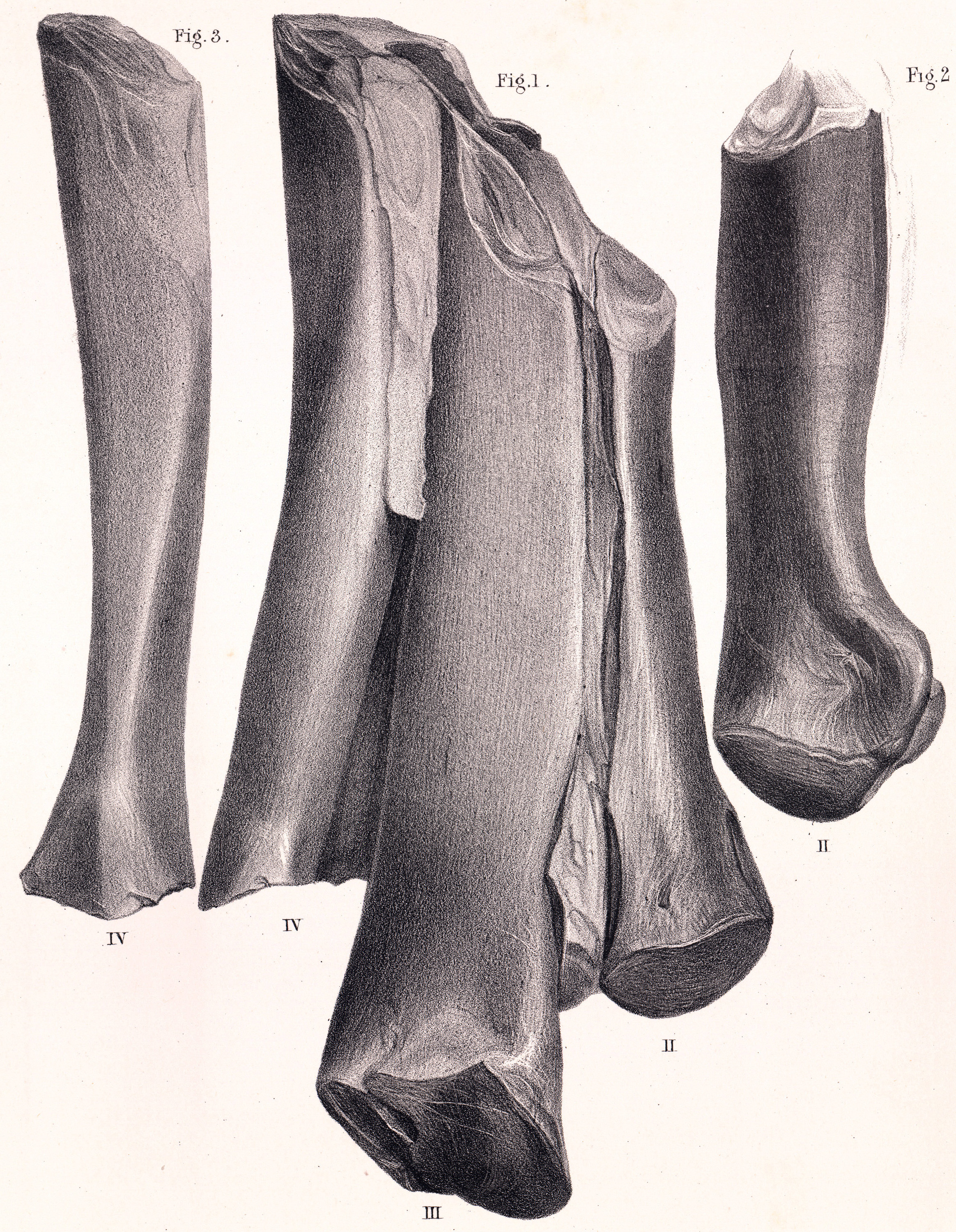
Lithograph of the partial left metatarsus of Valdoraptor, from Owen (1858, mirrored)

In 1858 Richard Owen referred a fossil consisting of a set of three metatarsals, foot bones, part of the collection of the British Museum of Natural History, to the herbivorous dinosaur genus Hylaeosaurus because of its size and bone texture. Owen had a lithograph made of the bones that gave a mirrored image: although they were in fact from the left foot, it now seemed they were from the right foot.

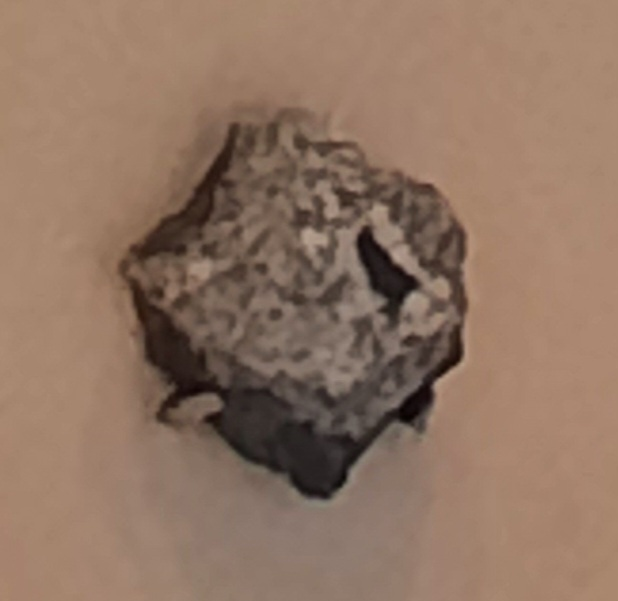
Tooth of V. oweni from Hastings, Sussex

By 1881 John Whitaker Hulke had recognised that the specimen represented a foot from a carnivorous theropod. In 1888 Richard Lydekker referred the specimen to the theropod species Megalosaurus dunkeri but in 1889 he named a separate species for it because of the more robust build: Megalosaurus oweni. The specific name honours Owen. Lydekker was deceived by the 1858 illustration into thinking that it was the right foot. He also incorrectly assumed it had four metatarsals, a mistake repeated for over a century. Lydekker referred several other foot specimens to the species: BMNH 2574, 2661 and 2680 from the same stratigraphic horizon, and also BMNH R604d and BMNH R1525, uncovered from the earlier Wadhurst Clay Formation in the Hollington Quarry near Hastings.

== Classification ==
Though originally classified as a species of Megalosaurus, in 1923 Friedrich von Huene assigned the species to Altispinax, making the combination Altipsinax oweni. In 1991 George Olshevsky placed the species in a new genus, Valdoraptor, renaming its type species Megalosaurus oweni into Valdoraptor oweni. The generic name is derived from Latin Valdus, "Wealden", referring to the Wealden Group, and raptor, "plunderer".

The species has since been suggested to be identical to either Neovenator or Eotyrannus; it has also been held to be a nomen dubium. However, Darren Naish in 2007 concluded that the specimen showed two unique derived traits or autapomorphies, in that the second metatarsal is both mediolaterally compressed and features a prominent dorsolateral ridge. These traits imply it is a valid taxon and different from Neovenator and Eotyrannus.

Olshevsky assigned Valdoraptor to the Allosauridae but Naish in 2007 stated that no more precise determination was possible than the more general Tetanurae. A 2014 re-evaluation found that Valdoraptor was likely one of the oldest known ornithomimosaurs, and a possible junior synonym of Thecocoelurus.

== See also ==
- Timeline of ornithomimosaur research
