= Royal African Corps =

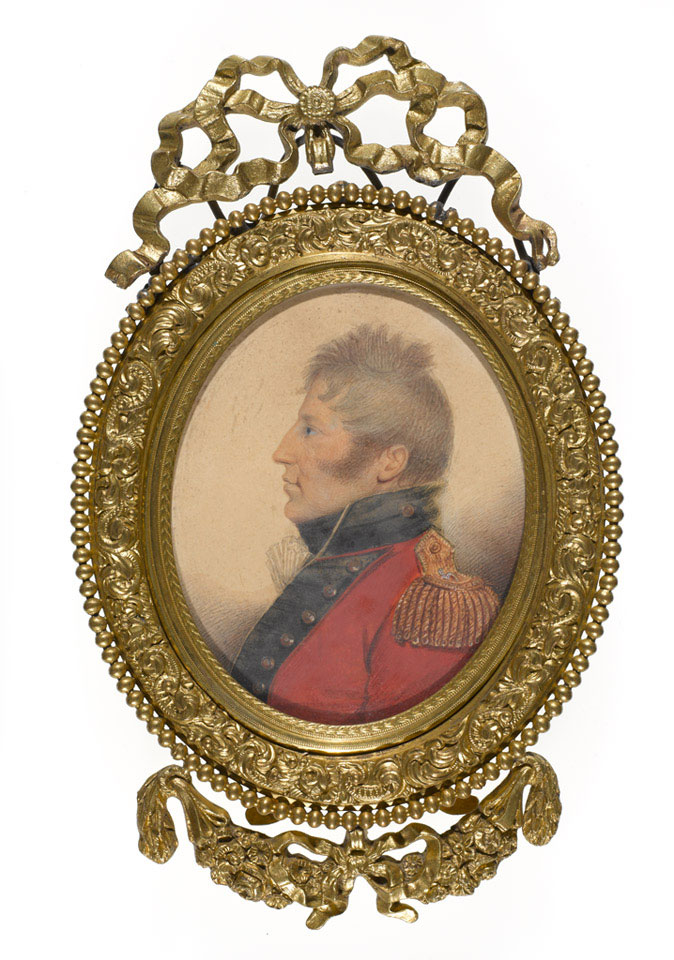
c. 1812 portrait of Charles MacCarthy as the regimental lieutenant colonel

The Royal African Corps was an infantry regiment of the British Army officially established on 25 April 1804. As Fraser’s Corps of Infantry, it had been earlier raised for the defense of the Island of Goree, Senegal in August 1800. The regiment was one of several penal battalions employed for colonial garrison duty in the early 19th century.

== History ==
Originally raised in 1800 as Fraser’s Corps of Infantry or the Goree Corps, this unit was subsequently renamed the African Corps. On 25 April 1804 the distinction of "Royal" was added to the title. It was composed primarily of deserters and condemned men from the hulks, with some additional indigenous African soldiers being attached to make up numbers.

In 1806 a detachment of the Royal African Corps was sent to serve in the West Indies as the Royal West India Rangers. The remainder of the Corps continued to perform garrison duties in various African colonies until 1819, when the four companies serving in Sierra Leone and Gambia were disbanded.

Prior to 1817 several companies of the Royal African Corps had been posted to the Cape Colony. Local residents there complained of the Corps' behaviour. By now recruited from foreigners as well as British Army deserters and convicts, the Corps was finally disbanded in 1821.
