= Slave Trade Act 1807 =

Act of the Parliament of the United Kingdom

- Act of Parliament
- Parliament of the United Kingdom
- Long title: An Act for the Abolition of the Slave Trade.
- Citation: 47 Geo. 3 Sess. 1. c. 36
- Introduced by: William Grenville (Lords)
- Territorial extent: United Kingdom; British Empire; (Note: Section 1.)

Dates
- Royal assent: 25 March 1807
- Commencement: 1 May 1807
- Repealed: 6 August 1861
Other legislation
Amended by	Slave Trade Felony Act 1811; Slave Trade (No. 2) Act 1818
Repealed by	Statute Law Revision Act 1861
Relates to	Slave Trade Felony Act 1811

Status: Repealed

Text of statute as originally enacted

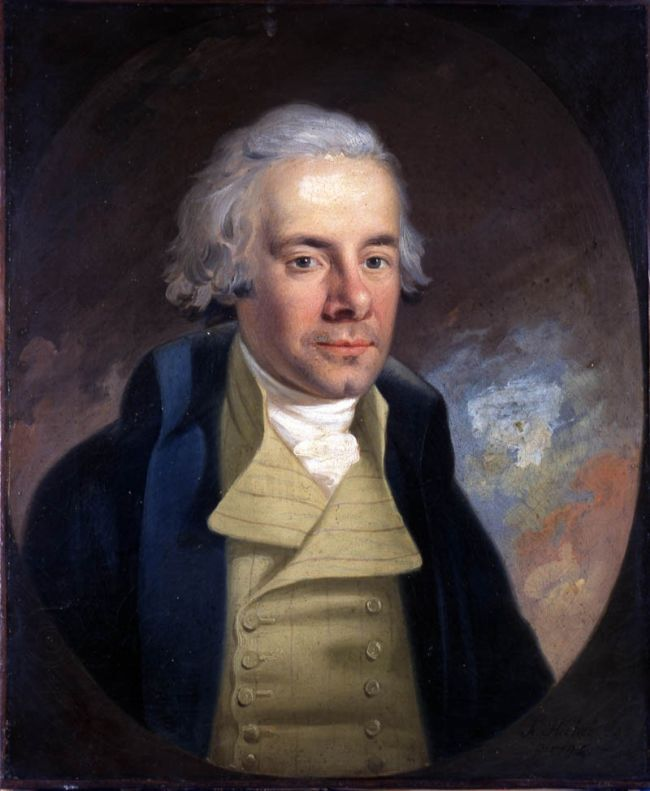
William Wilberforce, the leader of the British campaign to abolish the slave trade.

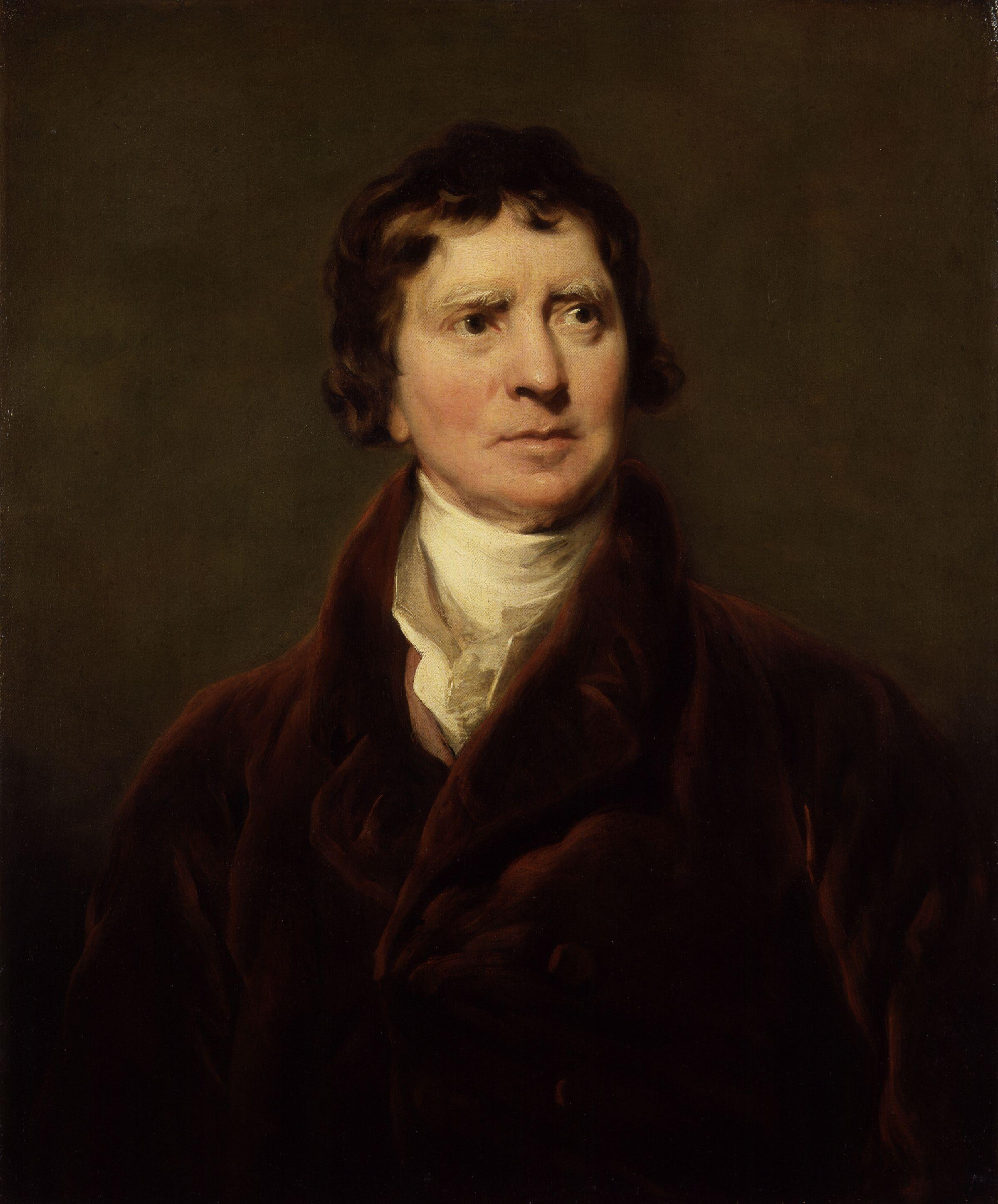
Henry Dundas, 1st Viscount Melville by Sir Thomas Lawrence

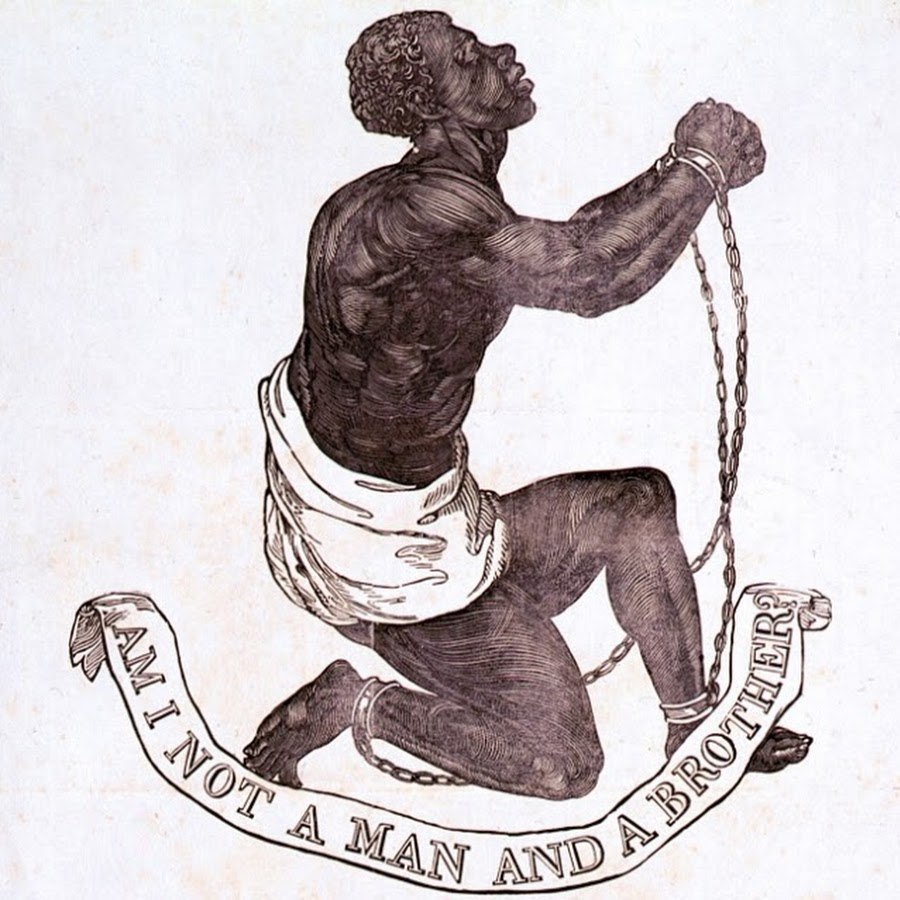
Wedgwood anti-slavery medallion created as part of anti-slavery campaign by Josiah Wedgwood, 1787.

The Slave Trade Act 1807 (47 Geo. 3 Sess. 1. c. 36), or the Abolition of Slave Trade Act 1807, was an act of the Parliament of the United Kingdom prohibiting the Atlantic slave trade in the British Empire. Although it did not automatically emancipate those enslaved at the time, it encouraged British action to press other nation states to abolish their own slave trades. It took effect on 1 May 1807, after 18 years of trying to pass an abolition bill.

Many of the supporters thought the act would lead to the end of slavery. Slavery on English soil was unsupported in English law and that position was confirmed in Somerset's case in 1772, but it remained legal in most of the British Empire until the passing of the Slavery Abolition Act 1833 (3 & 4 Will. 4. c. 73).

== Background ==
As British historian Martin Meredith writes, "In the decade between 1791 and 1800, British ships made about 1,340 voyages across the Atlantic, landing nearly 400,000 slaves. Between 1801 and 1807, they took a further 266,000. In the overall Atlantic slave trade, British ships carried a third of all slaves shipped across the Atlantic—approximately 3.5 million Africans."

The Committee for the Abolition of the Slave Trade was formed in 1787 by a group of Evangelical English Protestants allied with the Quakers, to unite in their shared opposition to slavery and the slave trade. The Quakers had long viewed slavery as immoral, and a blight upon humanity. By 1807 the abolitionist groups in Britain had a very sizeable faction of like-minded members in the British Parliament. At their height they controlled 35–40 seats. Known as the "Saints", the alliance was led by the best known of the anti-slave trade campaigners, William Wilberforce, who had taken on the cause of abolition in 1787 after having read the evidence that Thomas Clarkson had amassed against the trade. These dedicated Parliamentarians had access to the legal draughtsmanship of James Stephen, Wilberforce's brother-in-law. They often saw their personal battle against slavery as a divinely ordained crusade. On Sunday, 28 October 1787, Wilberforce wrote in his diary: "God Almighty has set before me two great objects, the suppression of the slave trade and the reformation of manners."

On 2 April 1792, William Wilberforce sponsored a motion in the House of Commons "that the trade carried on by British subjects, for the purpose of obtaining slaves on the coast of Africa, ought to be abolished." He had introduced a similar motion in 1791, which was soundly defeated by MPs, with a vote of 163 opposed, 88 in favour. Henry Dundas was not present for that vote, but when it was again before MPs in 1792, Dundas tabled a petition from Edinburgh residents who supported abolition. He then went on to affirm his agreement in principle with Wilberforce's motion: "My opinion has been always against the Slave Trade." He argued, however, that a vote for immediate abolition would be ineffective, as it would not prevent merchants from other countries from stepping in to continue the trade abandoned by the British. He stated: "this trade must be ultimately abolished, but by moderate measures". He proposed an amendment that would add the word "gradual" to the Wilberforce motion. The amendment was adopted, 192 in favour, 125 opposed. The motion as amended then passed 230 in favour, 85 opposed. Dundas insisted that any abolition of the slave trade would have to be dependent on the support of West Indian colonial legislatures, and the implementation of laws concerning the amelioration of the conditions of slaves. Abolitionists argued that West Indian assemblies would never support such measures, and that making the abolition of the slave trade dependent on colonial reforms would cause indefinite delay.

Three weeks after the vote, Dundas tabled resolutions setting out a plan to implement gradual abolition by the end of 1799. At that time he told the House that proceeding too quickly would cause West Indian merchants and landowners to continue the trade "in a different mode and other channels." He argued that "if the committee would give the time proposed, they might abolish the trade; but, on the contrary, if this opinion was not followed, their children yet unborn would not see the end of the traffic." MPs voted in favour of ending the trade in slaves by the end of 1796, after defeating proposals to end the trade in slaves in 1795 or 1794. The House then amended the supporting resolutions tabled by Dundas, to reflect the new target date of 1796. The motion and resolutions did not receive consent in the House of Lords, however, consideration being formally deferred to a subsequent session on 5 June 1792, where they were never revived.

Thus the 1792 Slave Trade Bill was passed by the House of Commons; but mangled and mutilated by the modifications and amendments of Pitt, Earl of Mornington, Edward James Eliot and MacDonald, it lay for years, in the House of Lords.

Abolitionists’ numbers were magnified by the precarious position of the government under Lord Grenville, whose short term as prime minister was known as the Ministry of All the Talents. Grenville himself led the fight to pass the bill in the House of Lords, while in the Commons the bill was led by the First Lord of the Admiralty, Charles Grey, (later Earl Grey). (Charles James Fox, who had led earlier battles in the Commons over the issue, had died in September of the previous year.) Other events also played a part; the Acts of Union 1800 brought 100 Irish MPs into Parliament, most of whom supported abolition. The Bill was first introduced to Parliament in January 1807. It went to the House of Commons on 10 February 1807. On 23 February 1807, twenty years after he first began his crusade, Wilberforce and his team were rewarded with victory. After a debate lasting ten hours, the House agreed to the second reading of the bill to abolish the Atlantic slave trade by an overwhelming 283 votes for to 16. The bill received royal assent by King George III on 25 March 1807. The Act took effect on 1 May 1807. However, Kitty's Amelia had received clearance to sail on 27 April, before the deadline. Thus, when she sailed on 27 July, she did so legally. This was the last legal slave voyage for a British vessel.

All that took place against the background of the ongoing War of the Fourth Coalition. In the last months of 1806, Napoleon had won a major victory, crushing the military power of Prussia, entering into its capital Berlin and there issuing the Berlin Decree, bringing into effect the Continental System whose declared purpose was to weaken the British economy by closing French-controlled territory to its trade. Originally, the French Revolution had abolished slavery, but Napoleon – though claiming the mantle of continuing the revolutionary heritage – had in 1802 taken the reactionary step of reintroducing slavery in the French colonies. Thus, in abolishing the slave trade Britain – which could do little to directly oppose the string of French military victories on the continent – could at least gain the moral high ground against its French foe.

== Other nations ==
By its Act Against Slavery of 1793, the Parliament of Upper Canada in British North America (modern-day Canada) abolished the slave trade, freed slaves immigrating by choice or force, as well as children born to enslaved women subsequently upon their 25th birthday, but did not emancipate existing resident slaves. In 1805 a British Order-in-Council had restricted the importation of slaves into colonies that had been captured from France and the Netherlands. Following adoption of the 1807 act, Britain used its diplomatic influence to pressure other nations to end their own involvement in the slave trade. With the Anglo-Portuguese Treaty of 1810, Portugal agreed to restrict its trade into its colonies; in the Anglo-Swedish Treaty of 1813, Sweden outlawed its slave trade; and in the Treaty of Paris of 1814 whereby France agreed with Britain that the slave trade was "repugnant to the principles of natural justice" and agreed to abolish its involvement the slave trade in five years. In the 1814 Anglo-Dutch treaty the Netherlands outlawed its slave trade, and the 1817 Anglo-Spanish treaty called for Spain to suppress its trade by 1820.

The United States adopted its Act Prohibiting Importation of Slaves on 2 March 1807, the same month and year as the British action. It provided for the abolition of its Atlantic slave trade but did not alter its internal trade in slaves, while the American abolition of the international slave trade led to the creation of a coastwise slave trade in the United States. Article 1, Section 9, Clause 1 of the United States Constitution forbade the closing of the slave trade for twenty years, until 1808. The long-planned law was passed a year earlier, and with the economic incentives of the slave trade coming to an end, there was both a spike in the number of slaves being traded and a unification of political factions against the trade.

== Enforcement ==
The act created fines for ship captains who continued with the trade. These fines could be up to £100 per enslaved person found on a ship. The Royal Navy, which then controlled the world's seas, established the West Africa Squadron in 1808 to patrol the coast of West Africa, and between 1808 and 1860 they seized approximately 1,600 slave ships and freed 150,000 Africans who were aboard. The Royal Navy declared that ships transporting slaves would be treated the same as pirates. Action was also taken against African kingdoms which refused to sign treaties to outlaw the trade, such as "the usurping King of Lagos", who was deposed in 1851. Anti-slavery treaties were signed with over 50 African rulers.

In the 1860s, David Livingstone's reports of atrocities within the Arab slave trade in East Africa stirred up the interest of the British public, reviving the flagging abolitionist movement. The Royal Navy throughout the 1870s attempted to suppress "this abominable Eastern trade", at Zanzibar in particular. In 1890 Britain handed control of the strategically important island of Heligoland in the North Sea to Germany in return for control of Zanzibar, in part to help enforce the ban on slave trading.

== Subsequent developments ==
The whole act was repealed by section 1 of, and the schedule to, the Statute Law Revision Act 1861 (24 & 25 Vict. c. 101), which came into force on 6 August 1861.

== See also ==
- Amazing Grace (2006), a film that portrays the campaign to pass the act
- Centre for the Study of the Legacies of British Slavery
- Prohibition of the Black Slave Trade (equivalent Ottoman law)
- Slave Trade Act
