= Vice admiralty court =

Juryless courts located in British colonies

Vice admiralty courts were juryless courts located in British colonies that were granted jurisdiction over local legal matters related to maritime activities, such as disputes between merchants and seamen.

== American Colonies ==
American maritime activity had been primarily self-regulated in the early to mid-17th century. Smaller maritime issues were settled at court in local jurisdictions, prior to the establishment of courts to specialize in admiralty. In the colony of Massachusetts Bay, for instance, a maritime code to specialize in maritime legislation was created and in 1674 the Court of Assistants was established to determine all cases of admiralty. Typically the courts were presided over by a judge, unless it was deemed more suitable to be presided over by a jury. This was similar in Maryland, where a so-called 'Court of Admiralty' heard cases of maritime issues including sailor's wages, the carriage of goods and piracy. Originally these courts dealt primarily with commercial matters, and the judges which presided over them were appointed by the local population and were paid from the colonial treasuries. Their jurisdiction expanded, however, during the French and Indian War, to the condemnation of enemy ships including disposing of their possessions. It was not until the passage and the later stricter enforcement of the Navigation Acts by the British parliament from the 1650s through to the 1770s that the British government were granted more power over American maritime issues, as vice-admiralty courts began to enforce customs and hear criminal trials for smuggling.

In the 18th century, the British passed a variety of laws aimed at combating illegal smuggling in the American colonies. Americans had developed trade relationships with places such as southern Europe, the Netherlands and the West Indies, despite the fact that the Navigation Acts intended to give Great Britain a trade monopoly with its American colonies. The Molasses Act 1733 had tried to tax molasses and non-British sugar, though it was largely unsuccessful. Shipowners who imported manufactured goods from the Netherlands smuggled these products in absolute secrecy, with Crown officials estimating that the annual value of manufactured goods smuggled equaled £500,000. British admiralty prepared commissions to authorize governors to erect vice-admiralty courts throughout the American colonies. In 1701, William Atwood was dispatched to preside as judge of the Admiralty for New Hampshire and the Jerseys. Due to firm colonial opposition, however, the task was practically impossible so he retired only a few years later. Other vice-admiralty judges in Pennsylvania and southern colonies faced similar difficulties as locally elected authorities strongly opposed the work they were sent to do.

The courts became quickly unpopular. This was not only because of the express prohibition of jury trials or the fact that vice-admiralty judges tended to believe that common law courts did not have superior status. It was also because a whole range of technical issues confused the legal system. It was often not clear whether vice-admiralty courts had jurisdiction over creeks or bays, or whether the governor could create vice-admiralty courts through vice-regal powers, or whether or not there was a clear method of separating the jurisdictions and procedures of vice-admiralty and common law jurisdiction. As a consequence of this, vice-admiralty courts became ineffective and, as many colonists perceived, unjust.

=== American Revolution ===
In the early years of the American Revolution, the British parliament increased the power of vice-admiralty courts throughout the colonies to regulate maritime activities and combat smuggling. The Sugar Act 1764 established a so-called 'super' Vice-Admiralty Court in Halifax, Nova Scotia, presided over by a Crown-appointed judge, the first of which was British jurist and the later Governor of Barbados Dr. William Spry. The court was to have jurisdiction over all of America, with the legislation empowering customs officials to take seizures in ships to either a common law court, ruled over by a jury, or the new vice-admiralty court. However, the court in Nova Scotia lost its utility fairly quickly not only because of its distance from the centers of commerce and trade in the colonies, but because the cold weather made it difficult to travel to. Therefore, in spring 1768, the court in Halifax was abolished and Parliament authorized vice-admiralty courts in Boston, Charleston and Philadelphia. These courts held sessions heard without juries, with the burden of proof being on the accused instead of on the officers who seized their property. Much of the time vessels were seized by the Crown on weak evidence. The courts also generally only tried Americans, with British persons accused of violating trade legislation being heard by juries in common law courts.

The vice-admiralty courts were met with extensive protest from the colonies, and it became an important factor in motivating colonists to sever the political ties with their mother country. Many felt as though their right to be tried by their peers, a right which was seen as being part of the privilege of being an English subject, was being denied to them. From 1764 to 1768, it was often complained that it was unjust for a merchant, whose ship may be seized in Georgia, to travel 1,500 miles from Georgia to the court in Halifax to defend his property. Further criticisms was that the owner of the ship or maritime goods seized had to post a large bond before allowing to defend himself. Additionally, even if his trial ended in acquittal, he would still be required to pay costs.

It was argued by American colonists that vice-admiralty judges were corrupt and often abused their power. In the proceedings of the Continental Congress held in Philadelphia on 5 September 1774, a complaint was drafted to King George III that the "judges of admiralty and vice-admiralty courts are empowered to receive their salaries and fees from the effects condemned by themselves" with officers of the customs being empowered to "break open and enter houses without the authority of any civil magistrate". James Otis had further complained of the lack of justice in having juryless trials and the burden of proof on the accused. The complaint made in the Continental Congress is probably alluding to the payments made to the judge of the vice-admiralty court in Halifax, where they actually received their payment not through a Crown salary but through compensation through fees charged for condemning a ship, and through the sharing of the profits of the condemnation of that ship. This was not the case in the vice-admiralty courts established in Boston, Charleston and Philadelphia, where judges were paid only through salaries. In fact, the British government replied to the Congress' complaints in their Address of the People of Great Britain to the Inhabitants of America, where they mentioned that "four great Vice-Admiralty Courts were ... erected in different stations in America" and that "large salaries were settled upon the Judges, to make them independent. These salaries were paid not from the fines and forfeitures, but in the common way".

When the American Revolutionary War began, and the British court system effectively collapsed in America, the Continental Congress debated whether or not admiralty jurisdiction should be returned to the regular court system or if each state should form its own admiralty court. State admiralty courts were established from 1776 onward in all the states, the first of which being in Connecticut, Boston, New Hampshire, Rhode Island, South Carolina and Virginia. However, only a handful of these courts actually allowed for jury trials and appeals to Congress. Eventually, the American Constitution formed in 1789 vested admiralty jurisdiction in federal district courts.

== Australia ==
The first Vice-Admiralty Court established in Australia was in the colony of New South Wales in 1788. The first Vice-Admiral was Arthur Phillip and the first judge was Robert Ross. The court was abolished in 1911, when the Supreme Court of New South Wales was granted the Admiralty jurisdiction of the court.

== Canada ==
A Vice Admiralty Court was formed in Nova Scotia to try smugglers and to enforce the Sugar Act 1764 throughout British North America.

== British colonies in the Caribbean ==
In various British colonies in the Caribbean, several Vice Admiralty Courts were established in the early 19th century, playing a significant role in the fight against the slave trade. In total, the courts established in Tortola, Antigua, the Bahamas, Jamaica, Barbados, St. Christopher, Demerara, Dominica, Berbice, Trinidad, and Grenada freed 6,762 slaves between 1807 and 1825.

== Sierra Leone ==
The Sierra Leone Court of Vice Admiralty was founded by George Canning the British Foreign Secretary on 2 May 1807. Its role was to enforce the Abolition of the Slave Trade Act 1807 and the later Slave Trade Felony Act 1811. It provided the legal basis according to which the Royal Navy's West Africa Squadron could operate. The letters patent indicated that the courts role was the confiscation of ships involved in the slave trade, the liberation of the enslaved Africans and the confiscation of any other goods found on board. The court functioned until 1817 when it was replaced by a Mixed Commission Court.

The first judge was Alexander Smith, a former shopkeeper, but he was replaced in 1808 by Robert Thorpe, a barrister with previous experience in Canada. Upon taking up his post, Thorpe complained about his predecessor's way of running the court to Lord Liverpool, and asked for clarification as regards the remit of the court. In April 1812, he tried Samuel Samo in the first court case brought under the Slave Trade Felony Act 1811.
