= Slave Trade Felony Act 1811 =

Act of the Parliament of the United Kingdom

- Act of Parliament
- Parliament of the United Kingdom
- Long title: An Act for rendering more effectual an Act made in the Forty seventh Year of His Majesty's Reign, intituled, "An Act for the Abolition of the Slave Trade."
- Citation: 51 Geo. 3. c. 23
- Introduced by: Henry Brougham (Lords)
- Territorial extent: United Kingdom; British Empire

Dates
- Royal assent: 14 May 1811
- Commencement: 1 June 1811 (Note: Section 1.)
- Repealed: 6 August 1861
Other legislation
Amends	Abolition of Slave Trade Act 1807
Amended by	Slave Trade (No. 2) Act 1818; Slave Trade (No. 4) Act 1818
Repealed by	Statute Law Revision Act 1861
Relates to	Slave Trade Act 1807

Status: Repealed

Text of statute as originally enacted

The Slave Trade Felony Act 1811 (51 Geo. 3. c. 23) was an act of the Parliament of the United Kingdom that made engagement in the slave trade a felony. The earlier Slave Trade Act 1807 (47 Geo. 3 Sess. 1. c. 36) merely imposed fines that were insufficient to deter entrepreneurs from engaging in such a profitable business. The contexts in which it could be applied and how these sat within international criminal law gave rise to controversy. Henry Brougham was the principal proponent of the act.

The first case brought under the act was that of Samuel Samo, who was tried by Chief Justice Robert Thorpe at the Vice-Admiralty Court in Freetown, Sierra Leone. The case was heard from 8 to 11 April 1812.

== Subsequent developments ==
The whole act was repealed by section 1 of, and the schedule to, the Statute Law Revision Act 1861 (24 & 25 Vict. c. 101), which came into force on 6 August 1861.

== See also ==
- Slave Trade Acts
