= Mangé Demba =

Mangé Demba also Mungo Demba, (17??–1822) was a Baga King (Mangé) who held sway over a region in West Africa which stretched along ninety miles of the Guinea coast and extending up to two hundred miles inland.

Demba's mother was probably Maboye, daughter of the King of Tomboli, and his father probably Sumba Tumani.
