= Schabas =

Schabas is a surname. Notable people with this surname include:

- Ezra Schabas (1924–2020), American-born Canadian musician, educator and author
- Louisa Schabas, Canadian production designer
- Margaret Schabas (born 1954), Canadian philosopher and professor
- Michael Schabas (born 1956), Canadian-born UK-based railway consultant
- Paul Schabas, Canadian jurist
- Richard Schabas (born 1951), Canadian public health physician
- William Schabas (born 1950), American-born Canadian academic
