= Margaret Schabas =

Canadian philosopher

Margaret Schabas FRSC
- Born: 1954 (age 71–72); Toronto, Canada

Philosophical work
- Era: 20th-century philosophy
- Region: Western philosophy
- School: Analytic philosophy
- Main interests: Philosophy of science; Philosophy of economics

Margaret Schabas FRSC (born 1954) is a Canadian philosopher and professor of philosophy at the University of British Columbia notable for her work in the history and philosophy of science, particularly the science of economics. Schabas has also published numerous articles and book chapters on the British empiricists, David Hume, Adam Smith, and John Stuart Mill.

== Early life and education ==
Schabas was born in Toronto, Canada. Her grandfather, Barker Fairley, father, Ezra Schabas, and older brother, William Schabas, are all recipients of the Order of Canada. Her maternal grandmother, Margaret Fairley, was a prominent political activist and writer. Her mother, Ann Schabas, was Professor and Dean of the Faculty of Information (formerly the Faculty of Library and Information Studies) at the University of Toronto. Her brother Michael Schabas, is a prominent transit planner in the U.K., and another brother, Paul Schabas, is a Judge on the Superior Court of Ontario and served as Treasurer (President) of the Law Society of Ontario. Another brother, Richard Schabas, served as Chief Medical Officer for the Province of Ontario.

Schabas holds a B.S. in Music (Oboe) and Philosophy of Science, and an A.M. in the History and Philosophy of Science, both from Indiana University-Bloomington. She completed her Ph.D. in the History and Philosophy of Science and Technology from the University of Toronto in 1983, and an M.A. in Economics from the University of Michigan in 1985.

== Academic career ==
Schabas has been a professor at the University of Wisconsin-Madison (1987–91) and York University in Toronto (1991-2001). She has been a visiting professor at Michigan State University, University of Colorado at Boulder, Harvard University, California Institute of Technology, the Sorbonne, and the Ecole Normale Supérieure de Cachan. In 2001, she was appointed professor in the philosophy department of the University of British Columbia.[5] She has received a number of prestigious fellowships, taking her to Stanford University, Harvard University, Duke University, MIT, Cambridge, the Max Planck Institute, and the London School of Economics.

Schabas chaired the Program Committee for the History of Science Society (1997) and served on its Council. From 2004-2009, she served as Head of the Philosophy Department at UBC and in 2013-14, she was elected and served as President of the History of Economics Society. She has received a teaching award from the Faculty of Arts, York University, and a Killam research award from the University of British Columbia and the Dean of Arts Annual Award (2022) from the University of British Columbia. In November 2022, she was inducted as Fellow of the Royal Society of Canada.

She is currently on the editorial or advisory board of a dozen journals, including Hume Studies, HOPOS, Economics and Philosophy, History of Political Economy, Journal of the History of Economic Thought, and the European Journal of the History of Economic Thought. She has given a number of keynote addresses, including to the International Hume Society, the History of Economics Society, and HOPOS.

== Selected works ==
- A Philosopher’s Economist: Hume and the Rise of Capitalism, co-authored with Carl Wennerlind (Chicago: The University of Chicago Press 2020).
- David Hume's Political Economy. Eds. Carl Wennerlind and Margaret Schabas (London: Routledge 2008; paperback 2009).
- The Natural Origins of Economics. (Chicago: The University of Chicago Press 2005; paperback 2007).
- Oeconomies in the Age of Newton. Eds. Margaret Schabas and Neil De Marchi (Durham, NC and London: Duke University Press 2003).
- A World Ruled by Number: William Stanley Jevons and the Rise of Mathematical Economics. (Princeton, NJ: Princeton University Press 1990).
