= Railroad Development Corporation =

American railroad holding company

- Industry: Rail transport
- Founded: 1987
- Founder: Henry Posner III; Robert A. Pietrandrea
- Headquarters: Pittsburgh, Pennsylvania, United States
- Key people: Markus Hunkel (CEO; Germany)
- Products: Hamburg-Köln-Express; Autozug Sylt
- Subsidiaries: RDC-Deutschland
- Website: www.rrdc.com

The Railroad Development Corporation is an American railroad holding company based in Pittsburgh, Pennsylvania. It operates several short line railroads outside the United States and acts as an investor, with management and institutional investors as partners. It was founded in 1987 by former Conrail employee Henry Posner III.

== Americas ==
=== Argentina ===
RDC participated in the ownership of two rail lines in Argentina:

- ALL Central, a 5 ft 6 in (1,676 mm) broad gauge line also in partnership with América Latina Logística and the Argentine government. It formerly operated as Buenos Aires al Pacífico - San Martin, Ferrocarril General San Martín, and Buenos Aires and Pacific Railway.
- ALL Mesopotámica, a 4 ft 8 1/2 in (1,435 mm) standard gauge line in partnership with América Latina Logística and the Argentine government. It formerly operated as Ferrocarril Mesopotámico - General Urquiza and Ferrocarril General Urquiza. In October 2013, both lines were nationalized and were taken over by Trenes Argentinos Cargas y Logistica.

=== Colombia ===
In August 2012 Ferrocarril del Pacífico that RDC has a shareholding in, resumed operations on the Buenaventura to Yumbo section of the Pacific line.

=== Guatemala ===
RDC managed the previously closed 914 mm (3 ft) gauge Ferrovias Guatemala (FVG) under a 50-year concession from 1997. In August 2006, the government of Guatemala invalidated a 2003 contract for the usufruct of rolling stock and other equipment. Due to the continuing uncertainty leading to losses, FVG suspended all operations on October 1, 2007, while continuing with legal actions against the Guatemalan government. The legal action was settled in RDC's favor in December 2013.

=== Peru ===
In July 1999 the Peruvian government awarded a consortium led by RDC a 30-year concession to operate the former Ferrocarril del Centro. Investors in Ferrocarril Central Andino (FCCA) included RDC, Juan Olaechea & Company, Minas Buenaventura, Cementos Andino, Mitsui and the Commonwealth Development Corporation. It was agreed in June 2006 by the Peruvian government that FCCA should go ahead with converting the Ferrocarril Huancayo - Huancavelica from 3 ft (914 mm) to 4 ft 8 1/2 in (1,435 mm) (standard gauge). Estimated to take 16 months, the US$33m project was to be funded jointly by the government and CAF – Development Bank of Latin America and the Caribbean. This project was finished by October 2010.

=== United States ===
RDC operates the Iowa Interstate Railroad. RDC first invested in the railroad in 1991, exercising an option to purchase in January 2004.

In November 2008, RDC entered a joint venture with LeGrand America to operate a business class road coach service from Pittsburgh and Harrisburg. It ceased in July 2009.

In December 2022, RDC became part of a $16 million proposal by SEPTA and Chester County in southeastern Pennsylvania to connect the borough of West Chester to Delaware County on a line that hasn't seen service since 1986. The proposal would provide a Metro line using rechargeable, battery-driven light rail service based on Class 230 trains built from recycled London Underground cars with a 60-mile range.

== Europe ==
=== Belgium ===
In January 2015, RDC purchased a 25% shareholding in Eurorail.

=== Estonia ===
RDC purchased a 5% shareholding in Eesti Raudtee on August 31, 2001, selling it on January 9, 2007.

=== France ===
In 2009 Réseau Ferré de France, Caisse des dépôts et consignations and RDC formed a joint venture to promote local freight.

=== Germany ===
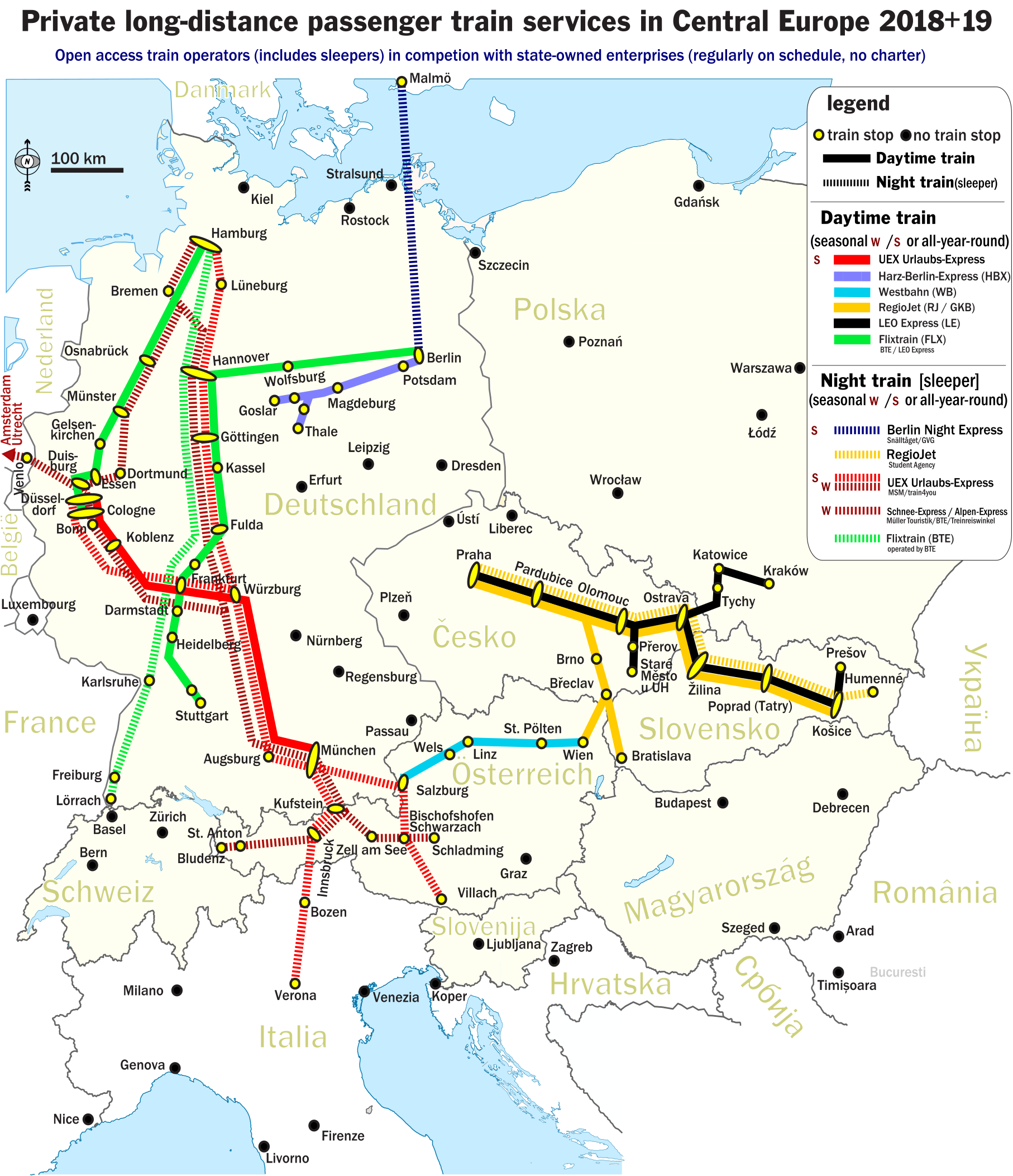
RDC long-distance trains in Germany: BTE-operated Flixtrain between Hamburg and Cologne (green) & BTE AutoReiseZug (also green)

Hamburg-Köln-Express (HKX) was founded as a joint venture in November 2009 between RDC (75%), Locomore (17.5%) and railway investor Michael Schabas (7.5%). Services were initially planned to start in August 2010 but this was postponed after the paths it had identified for its services were claimed by Keolis for a proposed Mulhouse to Hamburg open-access service. Keolis later abandoned its plans and HKX was able to reapply for the paths. Operations commenced on July 23, 2012.

In December 2015, RDC-owned HKX stopped operating the Hamburg-Köln-Express, the operation was then carried out by the independent rail tourism company BahnTouristikExpress (BTE). Following 2016 reports that the German motorail operator DB Fernverkehr was about to terminate all motorail services in Germany by October 2016, RDC purchased a 50% share in BTE as the company had a number of car-carrier wagons in stock. Following the purchase, on 18 October 2016, RDC commenced operating RDC Autozug Sylt car shuttle services from Niebüll to Westerland after securing a 10-year access agreement. Services were initially hauled by a Transdev Class 251 while using BTE car-carrier wagons. BTE in December 2016 started operating the BTE AutoReiseZug motorail service between Hamburg and Lörrach.

Beginning in April 2017 Markus Hunkel took over management of Railroad Development Corporation Deutschland (RDCD).

In October 2017, BTE and therefore RDC terminated the Hamburg-Köln-Express service without further notice. The service of the former Hamburg-Köln-Express was then restarted in March 2018 on the same route by the company Flixmobility under the brand name Flixtrain, but again with BTE as the train operator. The brand name HKX was replaced by the green Flixtrain label. In November 2017, RDC bought two Siemens Vectron diesel locomotives for its RDC Autozug Sylt car shuttle operations.

In 2018 and 2019, BTE is also offering the seasonal night train Alpen Express (winter) between the Netherlands and Austria in cooperation with the Dutch agency Treinreiswinkel. In 2020, RDC started operating the seasonal night train Alpen-Sylt Nachtexpress between the island of Sylt and Salzburg, Austria. In 2021, its operation will also include southwestern Germany with Konstanz as destination by dividing southbound trains in Gemünden.

In January 2021, RDC Autozug Sylt was awarded the contract to operate the Akkunetz Nord regional train network in the state of Schleswig-Holstein, beginning in December 2023. The rolling stock, battery-electric Stadler Flirt Akku trains, was to be provided by the tendering authority. The network was to comprise the following train services:

- RE72 between Flensburg and Kiel,
- RB73 between Eckernförde and Kiel,
- RE74 between Husum and Kiel,
- RB75 between Rendsburg and Kiel, and
- RB64 between Husum and Bad St. Peter-Ording.

In January 2022, the contract was terminated after legal action by incumbent DB Regio. Instead of RDC, Nordbahn was awarded the contract.

=== United Kingdom ===
RDC was a shareholder in Vivarail, a now-defunct company that converted London Underground D78 Stock electric multiple units into Class 230 diesel multiple units.

=== International night trains ===
From December 2021, the overnight Amsterdam‒Zürich Nightjet service has connected Zürich via Cologne to Amsterdam. The train is operated jointly by Austrian Federal Railways (ÖBB), Swiss Federal Railways (SBB) and Nederlandse Spoorwegen (NS), using sleeper and couchette coaches leased from RDC Asset GmbH. The leased arrangement was planned to last until the construction and delivery of new fixed-formation ÖBB Nightjet carriages.

In August 2021, Swedish rail company SJ AB announced it had been selected by the Swedish Transport Administration to operate a new EuroNight service from Stockholm via Copenhagen to Hamburg from mid-2022. The train is operated jointly with RDC and its subsidiary BahnTouristikExpress (RDC), with RDC providing the rolling stock, and RDC/BTE providing crew within Germany.

At their annual press conference in March 2025, Swiss Federal Railways (SBB) announced plans to re-introduce overnight train service on the Basel to Copenhagen/Malmö route. The night train would be operated in partnership with Railroad Development Corporation starting from 2026, following the route of the previous CityNightLine Aurora service that had not operated since 2014. Rolling stock would be cascaded from the Amsterdam‒Zürich service.

== Africa ==
=== Malawi ===
Through the Central East African Railways consortium, RDC operated the Malawi Railways network which connects with the Caminhos de Ferro de Moçambique line in Mozambique from December 1999. The operation was sold in 2008.
