= Ezra Schabas =

Canadian musician (1924–2020)

Ezra Schabas CM OOnt
- Born: April 24, 1924; New York City, New York, U.S.
- Origin: Toronto, Ontario, Canada
- Died: October 12, 2020 (aged 96) Toronto, Ontario, Canada
- Occupations: musician, educator and author

Ezra Schabas, CM OOnt (April 24, 1924 – October 12, 2020) was a Canadian musician, educator and author. He was active in Canada's musical life beginning in 1952, when he emigrated from Cleveland with his family. During his time in Canada, he was a leading musical educator, clarinetist, and administrator in Toronto's musical institutions. He wrote several books on Canadian and American musical history, and he was appointed to the Order of Ontario and made a Member of the Order of Canada.

== Early life and education ==
Schabas was born in New York City in April 1924 to Jewish parents, Minnie Anker and Hyman Schabas. He attended the Juilliard School for clarinet, where he studied with clarinetist Arthur Christmann. The interruption of World War II led Schabas to leave Juilliard in 1943 with an Artist Diploma to serve with the US Army forces in France and Germany. While overseas, he attended the Nancy Conservatory before returning to New York City in 1946.

Upon his return, Schabas completed his Bachelor of Science at Juilliard in 1947, followed by a Master of Arts at Columbia University in 1948. For the next few years, he studied in a variety of places, including the Eastman School of Music in Rochester, NY, the American Conservatory at Fontainebleau, France, as well as clarinet in New York with David Weber and in Paris with Gaston Hamelin. Between 1948 and 1950, he taught at the University of Massachusetts and from 1950 to 1952 at Western Reserve University in Cleveland, before moving to Toronto to be a freelance clarinetist and concert manager at the Royal Conservatory of Music. He became a Canadian citizen in 1967.

== Career ==
After relocating to Toronto in 1952, Schabas became a director of the Royal Conservatory of Music, one of Canada's most esteemed music education institutions that has trained artists including Oscar Peterson, Glenn Gould and Sarah McLachlan. During his eight-year tenure at the Conservatory and afterwards, Schabas's clarinet pupils included Brian Barley, Paul Grice, Howard Knopf, Timothy Maloney, Peter Smith, and Patricia Wait. As a concert manager, he helped find engagements for young artists such as Jon Vickers and Lois Marshall.

In 1960, Schabas helped to found the National Youth Orchestra of Canada, a musical organization dedicated to discovering and nurturing talented young Canadian musicians, and he was the Orchestra's first administrator. That same year, he was appointed to the University of Toronto's faculty of music. He became the head of the performance and opera department from 1968 to 1978. In 1966, the Ontario Arts Council and the Ontario Federation of Symphony Orchestras commissioned him to report on Ontario Orchestras, which subsequently served as a blueprint for Ontario's orchestral development for the next thirty years. Schabas collaborated with the Ontario Arts Council again in 1968 to establish the University of Toronto Conductors' Workshop. In 1972, Schabas was one of the founders of Orchestras Canada and was elected its first president.

Having continued teaching at the Faculty of Music and Royal Conservatory of Music throughout his time at the National Youth Orchestra and Orchestras Canada, in 1978 Schabas was made Principal of the Conservatory, a position he held until 1983. During his time as Principal, he developed training programs for gifted children and pre-university teenagers. In 1980, he launched the Orchestral Training Program for professional musicians at the Conservatory, which received funding from Employment and Immigration Canada to help young Canadians find work in Canadian orchestras. That same year, he founded the Association of Colleges and Conservatories of Music, serving as its first president from 1980 to 1984.

Schabas followed up his time as Principal by returning to the University of Toronto's faculty of music in 1983, only to retire the following year. In 1985, he was named professor emeritus. From 1987 to 1990, Schabas again drew upon funding from Employment and Immigration Canada, the Ontario Arts Council and the Association of Canadian Orchestras to direct "Musical Performance and Communication." This unique professional training program at the University of Toronto sought to help classical musicians find new and better ways of attracting and communicating with audiences.

== Musician and author ==
Not only a teacher and administrator, Schabas performed and conducted in Canada, the United States and overseas. He worked as a freelance clarinetist for the CBC Orchestra until 1960 and played in a number of ensembles around Toronto, including the Toronto Woodwind Quintet from 1956 to 1960. As an educator, he spoke at conferences in Europe, Asia, South America, Canada and the US and was a frequent consultant and juror for the Canada Council for the Arts, the Ontario Arts Council, and Canadian Heritage, among others. He wrote three biographies on musicians and two on musical institutions, winning the 1995 City of Toronto Annual Book Award for Sir Ernest MacMillan: The Importance of Being Canadian. From 1996 to 1998, he also acted as president of The Arts and Letters Club of Toronto and in 2000 was elected director-general of the Canadian Encyclopedia of Music.

== Personal life ==
Schabas lived in Toronto and was married to Ann (Fairley) Schabas, the former dean of the Faculty of Library and Information Sciences at the University of Toronto. She is the daughter of Margaret Fairley, a notable Canadian activist and writer, and Barker Fairley, a well-respected Canadian artist and German literature scholar. They had five children: academic William Schabas, former Ontario Chief Medical Officer of Health Richard Schabas, academic Margaret Schabas, transportation executive Michael Schabas and Ontario Supreme Court Justice Paul Schabas. He had twelve grandchildren, including the novelist and Globe and Mail dance critic Martha Schabas, and eleven great-grandchildren.

He died in Toronto, Ontario in October 2020 at the age of 96.

== Awards ==
Schabas was awarded the Canadian Centennial Medal in 1967, appointed to the Order of Ontario in 1996, and made a Member of the Order of Canada in 2000. In 2002, he was appointed a Fellow (Honoris Causa) of the Royal Conservatory of Music, was presented with the Golden Jubilee Medal by the Governor General, and made a lifetime member of the Toronto Musicians Association. In 2012, he received the Queen's Diamond Jubilee Medal.

== Books ==
- 1989: Theodore Thomas: America's Conductor and Builder of Orchestras, 1835-1905, Champaign: University of Illinois Press; ISBN 978-0-252-01610-3
- 1994: Sir Ernest MacMillan: The Importance of Being Canadian, Toronto: University of Toronto Press, ISBN 978-0-8020-2849-5 (awarded the City of Toronto annual award, 1995).
- 2000: Opera Viva: The Canadian Opera Company; The First Fifty Years, co-authored with Carl Morey, Toronto: Dundurn Press, ISBN 978-1-55002-346-6
- 2005: There's Music In These Walls: A History of the Royal Conservatory of Music, Toronto: Dundurn Press, ISBN 978-1-55002-540-8
- 2007: Jan Rubes: A Man of Many Talents, Toronto: Dundurn Press, ISBN 978-1-55002-685-6

== See also ==
- William Schabas
- Margaret Fairley
- Barker Fairley
- The Royal Conservatory of Music
- Sir Ernest MacMillan
- National Youth Orchestra of Canada
