= Dorothy Keeling =

British social worker (1881–1967)

- Born: 2 December 1881; Bradford
- Died: 27 March 1967 (aged 85); Hendon
- Occupation: social worker
- Known for: transforming UK voluntary work and the Citizens Advice Bureaux
- Partner: Ellinor Black
- Parent: Rev. William Hulton Keeling (father)
- Relatives: Margaret Fairley (sister)

Dorothy Clarissa Keeling OBE (2 December 1881 – 27 March 1967) was a British social worker who joined The Bradford Guild of Help and went on to Liverpool where she transformed voluntary efforts there and in the UK.

== Life ==
Keeling was born in Bradford in 1881. Her mother was Henrietta Frances (born Gedge) and her father was the Reverend William Hulton Keeling who transformed Northampton and Bradford Grammar School. He was well connected to key people in the city. Her younger sister was the Canadian left-wing writer Margaret Adele (later Fairley).

In 1907 she joined The Bradford Guild of Help, which had been formed two years before, and she was a key member until in 1918 the personal services committee of the Liverpool Council of Voluntary Aid was established with Keeling as its first secretary. The organisation that would become the Liverpool Personal Services Society (and later just PSS) was founded in 1919 by philanthropist and prolific social campaigner Eleanor Rathbone and social worker and Keeling in Liverpool. The title 'Liverpool Personal Services Society was not adopted until 1922 but those involved with its creation were Eleanor Rathbone', Keeling, Elizabeth Macadam, and academic Frederic D'Aeth. They saw the need for friendly visiting. The PSS initially faced opposition by other charities who saw them as offering no material help and just another competitor.

Keeling would remain as the secretary of the PSS until the start of the World War II. It was not just advice that they gave as her volunteers ran boot and clothing clubs, a loan scheme, a holiday scheme and in 1932 the well funded Central Relief Society used the PSS to find the best place for its good works. The advice offered to clients included bureaux for new housing tenants, legal and marital advice, visits and care for both the old and those with disabilities.

In 1935 there were 9,000 families who asked for help. A quarter of these were cases referred to the PSS by other bodies but in the remaining cases the families had sought out Keeling's organisation themselves. They were supplying reliable and unbiased advice to families and by 1939 they had 560 volunteer workers.

The charity's first headquarters was on Stanley Street in Liverpool. A long queue of people that could be found lining up on its winding staircase to speak to someone at Liverpool Personal Services Society. 'The Crowded Stairs' was the title of Dorothy Keeling's book about social work in Liverpool, including the Liverpool Personal Services Society, 'The Crowded Stairs'.

She was appointed an Officer of the Order of the British Empire at the end of the war in 1946 for her work with the Citizens Advice Bureau. She went back to Liverpool and continued her relationship with Ellinor Black. She moved and took a job in a mental hospital when Black began lecturing in Sheffield in 1950 – Black became the head of the University of Sheffield's Social Science department in 1952. Black died in 1956 and Keeling moved back to Liverpool and she still took an interest in social work and the Citizen's Advice Bureaux.

Keeling died in Hendon on 27 March 1967.
