= Henry Posner III =

American transport executive and investor

- Born: 1955 (age 70–71)
- Education: Princeton University; Wharton School, University of Pennsylvania
- Occupations: transport executive; investor
- Years active: 1975‒
- Known for: Railroad Development Corporation; Iowa Interstate Railroad
- Board member of: Central East African Railways; East Broad Top Railroad; Hamburg-Köln-Express; Ferrovías Guatemala; Vivarail; Winchester Thurston School
- Spouse: Anne Molloy
- Children: 3

Henry Posner III is an American transport executive and investor working in the field of rail transport and founder of Railroad Development Corporation.

Posner received a bachelor's degree in civil engineering from Princeton University in 1977, and received a Master of Business Administration (MBA) in finance from Wharton School of the University of Pennsylvania in 1982.

In 2025, Posner was inducted into the American Short Line and Regional Railroad Association's Hall of Fame, alongside Ronald Batory and the late Earl Durden.

== Career ==
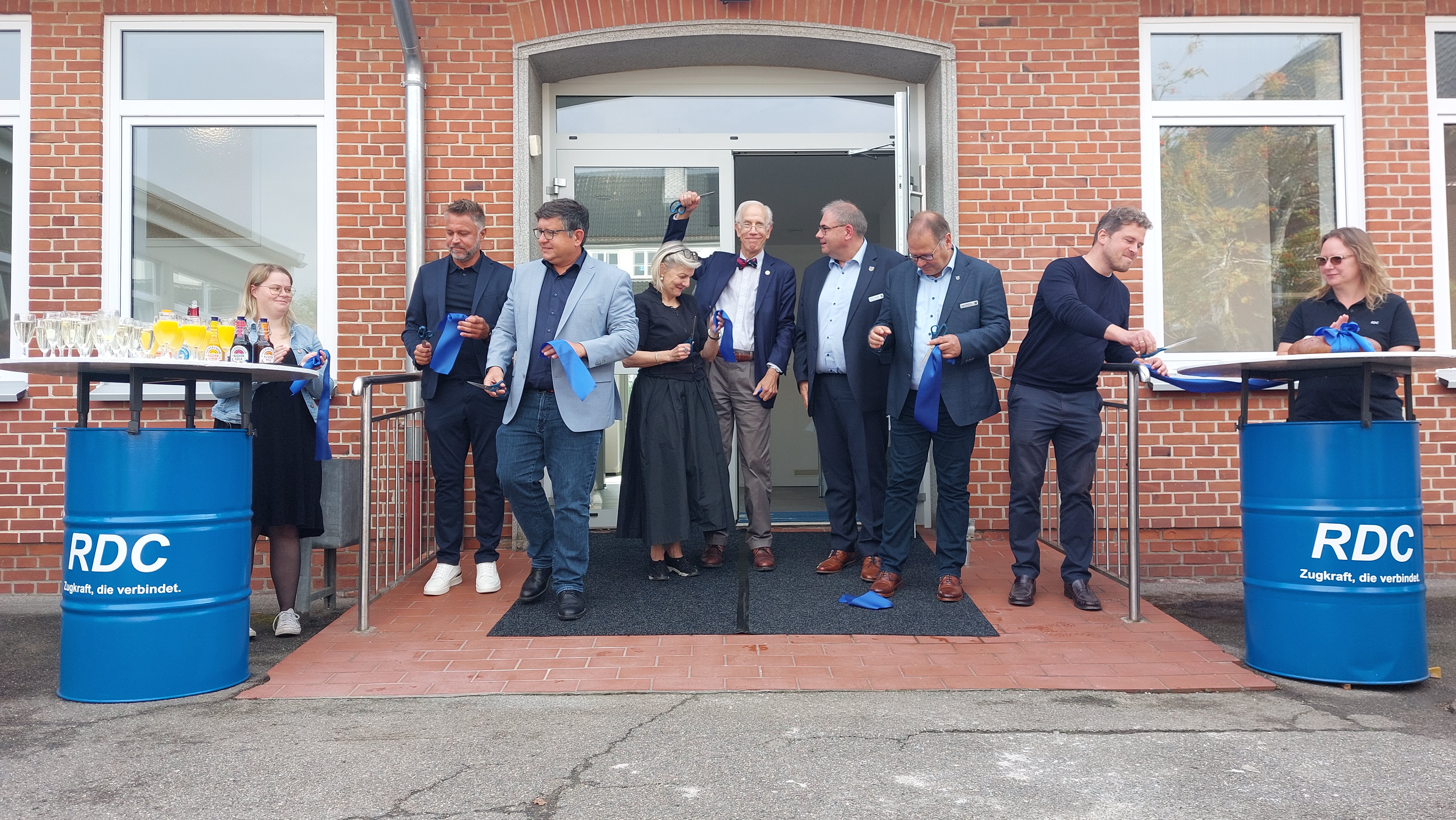
Posner III (centre) at a ribbon-cutting ceremony next to Niebüll station in 2025

During the 1970s Posner started selling Amtrak passenger tickets. Summer employment during university included proofreading timetables for the Official Railway Guide and an internship at Rock Island Railroad.

During a summer job working at Pennsylvania Truck Lines (part of Conrail), Posner was working for Anne Molley.

After graduating from Princeton University Posner worked as a trainmaster (conductor) at Conrail in New York City and in Detroit.

As of December 2014, Posner was chair of Railroad Development Corporation, chair of Hamburg-Köln-Express; chair of RegioRail in France, and vice chairman of The Hawthorne Group.

== Personal life ==
Posner's grandfather Henry Posner Sr. was born in Warsaw, Poland and emigrated to the United States in c.1905, aged seventeen. Posner's parents Henry Posner Jr. and Helen MacMurdo Posner were married in 1953. Henry Posner III married Anne Molley in 1982. As of 2015, Posner III continued to live in Pittsburgh, Pennsylvania.

From 1998 onwards, Posner served as a trustee of the Winchester Thurston School, additionally serving as president for four years.

In May 2014, Posner spoke at the International Transport Forum at the need for cooperation as well as competition within rail transport in Europe.

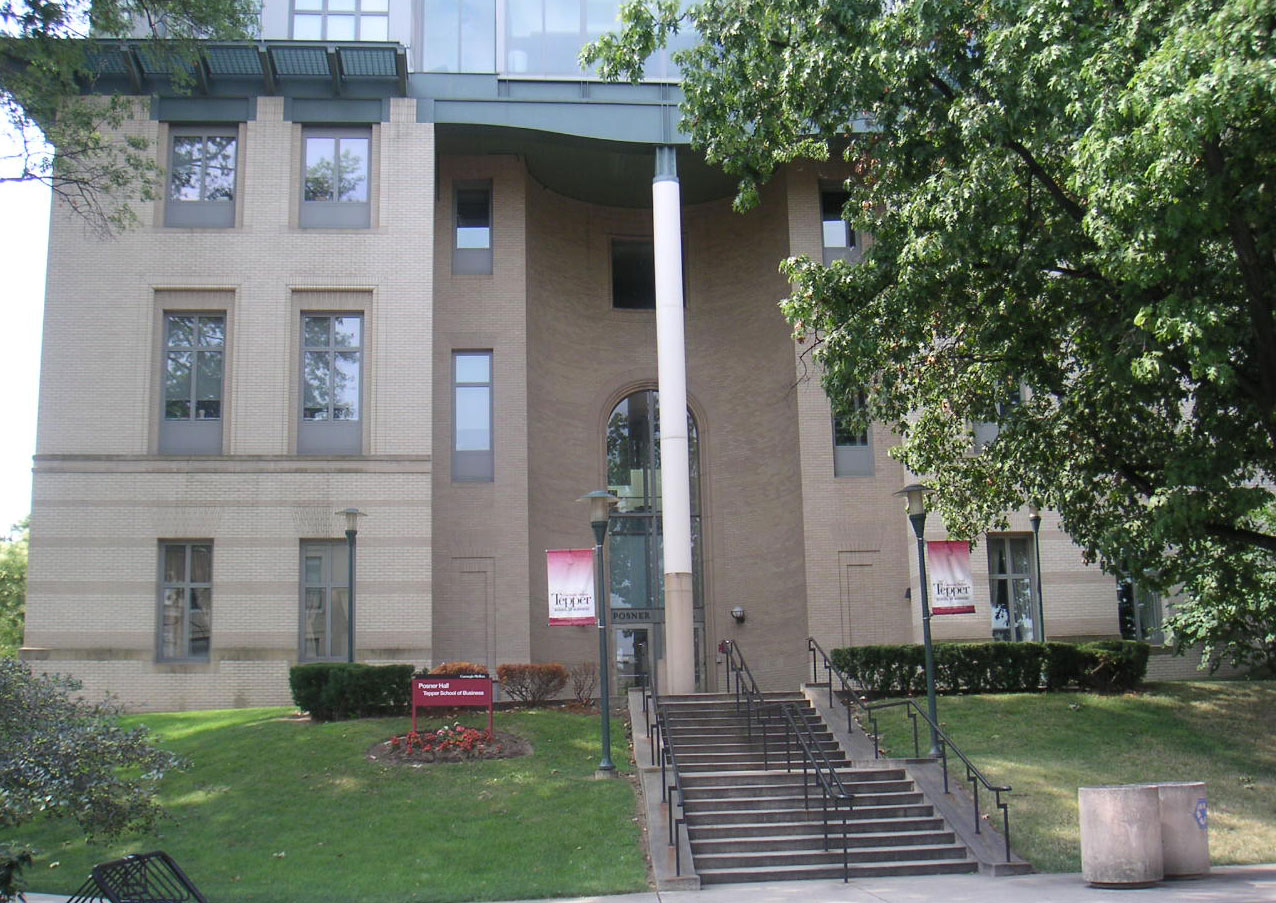
Posner Hall at Carnegie Mellon University, named after Posner's grandfather

Since 2017, Posner has been an adjunct instructor at Dietrich College of Humanities and Social Sciences Department of History at Carnegie Mellon University (CMU), teaching the course "The American Railroad-Decline and Renaissance in the Era of Deregulation". In the course Posner shares eccentric stories of his time working in the railroad industry. In 2021 Posner hired two students from the course to facilitate work on a battery-operated Vivarail D-Train imported from the United Kingdom for the "Pop-up Metro" project.

In February 2022, Posner briefly returned to front line service, crewing and interpreting under train conductor Martin Pavlik on board a refugee rescue train operated by RDC Deutschland between Frankfurt (Oder) station and Hannover Messe station in Germany, following the 2022 Russian invasion of Ukraine.

In mid-2022 the Posner Foundation renewed its yearly grant funding to Operation Lifesaver for work towards increasing safety at level crossings.

== Publications ==
Posner's photography archive is held by the Center for Railroad Photography and Art. Other interviews and presentations:

- Posner, Henry III (2009). Posner RFF interview. Réseau ferré de France Seminar (in French and English). Paris – via Youtube.
- Posner, Henry III (2012-04-13). Telling stories. Conversations About Photography. Lake Forest College: Center for Railroad Photography & Art – via Youtube.
- Posner, Henry III (2022-04-07). Kornhauser, Alain; Fishkin, Fred (eds.). Providing mobility to Ukrainian refugees (offset 01:24). Smart Driving Cars.
- Posner, Henry III (2022-04-22). Johnson, Bret (ed.). Sandhouse Rail Group: Ukraine's Railway War: If you can't send ammunition, give them a ride. McCormick School of Engineering (offset 02:45). Northwestern University – via Youtube.
- Posner, Henry III (2024-05-11). Keynote Address (offset 01:53). Pennsylvania Railroad Technical and Historical Society Annual Meeting. Railroaders Memorial Museum, Altoona, Pennsylvania: Russell Sharp – via Youtube.
- Posner, Ida; Posner, Henry III (2025-04-11). Henry Posner III - ASLRRA 2025 Short Line Industry Hall of Fame Inductee. American Short Line and Regional Railroad Association – via Youtube.
- Posner, Ida; Posner, Henry III (2025-11-18). Bajeux-Besnainou, Isabelle (ed.). Ida Posner & Henry Posner III, Railroad Development Corporation. Swartz Center for Entrepreneurship & Tepper School of Business. Family Business Leadership Series. Carnegie Mellon University (published 2025-12-01) – via Youtube.
- Posner, Henry III (2026-06-05). Atlas Shrugged—How Fiction Inspired Reality on Railways Worldwide. Galt's Gulch Conference. Atlas Shrugged. The Atlas Society (published 2026-07-03) – via Youtube.
