= Liverpool Personal Service Society =

British social care services charity

Coordinates: 53.42932°N 2.99373°W

PSS (UK) is a national social enterprise in the United Kingdom. Liverpool Personal Services Society was founded by Eleanor Rathbone and Dorothy Keeling in 1919, for over 100 years PSS has provided a range of support services.

The charity operates services in Liverpool, Manchester, Wirral, Staffordshire, Cheshire, Norfolk, Suffolk, Lincolnshire and North Wales.

== Head office ==
PSS's head office is in Eleanor Rathbone House, Derby Road in the Sandhills area of Liverpool. PSS moved into this office in 2018 from its previous home on Seel Street in the city centre.

== History ==
In 1918 the personal services committee of the Liverpool Council of Voluntary Aid was established with Dorothy Keeling as its first secretary.

Founded in 1919 by philanthropist and prolific social campaigner Eleanor Rathbone and social worker and campaigner Dorothy Keeling in Liverpool. The title 'Liverpool Personal Services Society was not adopted until 1922 but those involved with its creation were philanthropist and prolific social campaigner Eleanor Rathbone', Dorothy Keeling, Elizabeth Macadam (1871–1948), and academic Frederic D'Aeth. They saw the need for friendly visiting. The PSS faced opposition by other societies who saw it as offering no material help and as was just another competitor.

Keeling would remain as the secretary of the PSS until the start of the second world war. It was not just advice as the volunteers ran boot and clothing clubs, a loan scheme, a holiday scheme and in 1932 the well funded Central Relief Society used the PSS to find the best place for its funds. The advice offered included bureaux for new tenants, legal and marital advice, visiting and care for the old and disabled.

In 1935 there were 9,000 families who had asked for help. A quarter of these were cases referred to the PSS by other bodies but in the remaining cases the families had sought out the PSS themselves. They were supplying reliable and unbiased advice to families and by 1939 they had 560 volunteer workers.

The charity's first headquarters was on Stanley Street in Liverpool. A long queue of people that could be found lining up on its winding staircase to speak to someone at Liverpool Personal Services Society. 'The Crowded Stairs' was the title of Dorothy Keeling's book about social work in Liverpool, including the Liverpool Personal Services Society, 'The Crowded Stairs'.

== See also ==
- Bradbury Fields – another Liverpool charity and fellow member of the 800 Group.
