= Hamburg-Köln-Express =

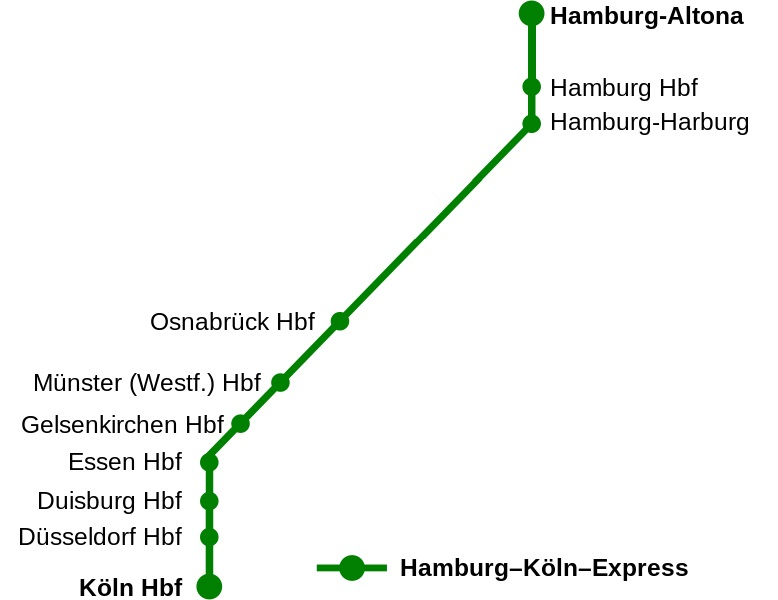
- Route of HKX

Overview
- Headquarters: Cologne
- Locale: Germany
- Dates of operation: 2012–2018

Technical
- Track gauge: 1,435 mm (4 ft 8 1/2 in) standard gauge
- Electrification: 15 kV 16.7 Hz

Other
- Website: https://www.hkx.de

Hamburg-Köln-Express GmbH (HKX) was a Cologne-based open-access train operating company providing long-distance railway passenger services in Germany. It was founded in October 2009 as a joint venture by Railroad Development Corporation (RDC) Deutschland GmbH, an affiliate of USA-based Railroad Development Corp., Locomore rail GmbH & CO. KG, and British railway investor Michael Schabas.

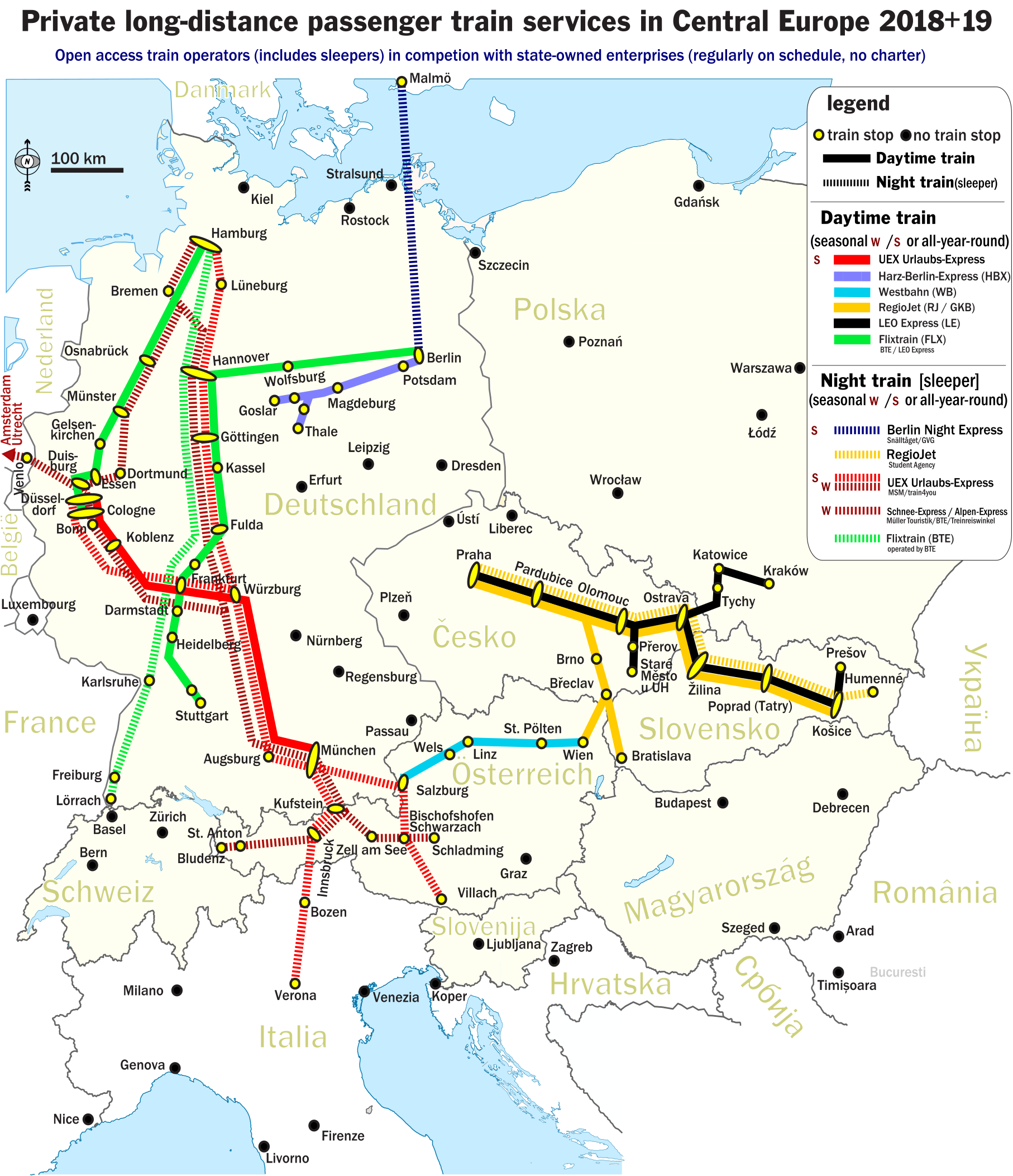
Connection map. Successor of HKX service shown in bright green.

Starting on 23 July 2012, HKX operated regular services between Hamburg-Altona and Cologne. The journey took about 4h 20min, similar to that of services operated by DB but with lower fares. On 24 March 2018, Flixmobility, the parent company of Flixbus, took over HKX's operations and the route was rebranded as a Flixtrain route, complementing the former Locomore train service operated by Leo Express on behalf of Flixmobility since 2017.

== Start ==
Services were initially planned to start in August 2010 but this was postponed as there were unresolved pathing conflicts between Keolis and HKX in the access application process with DB infrastructure affiliate DB Netz. After Keolis withdrew its applications in April 2010, a framework contract was signed in June 2010 with a planned expiry date of December 2015.

As of March 2012 the proposed service had still not had its safety case approved by the Federal Railway Authority.

HKX began selling tickets on 4 July 2012 and started operation on 23 July 2012.

== Operations ==
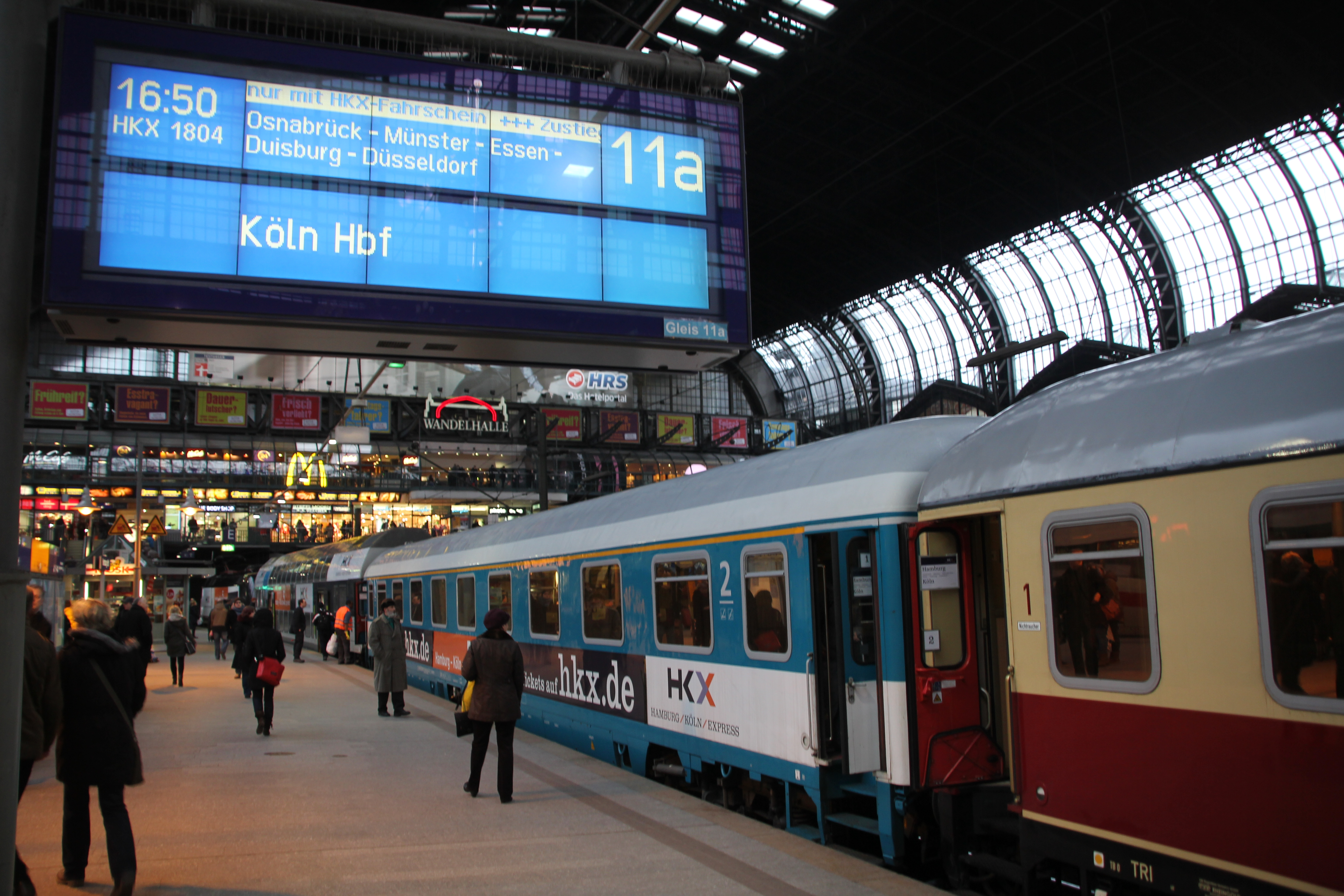
HKX train consisting of ex-Deutsche Reichsbahn UIC-Z passenger coaches at Hamburg Hauptbahnhof, February 2013

HKX operated at least one train each way each day, from Fridays to Mondays. Fares for the entire route ranged from €20 to €60.

The Hamburg-Köln-Express called at most intermediate stations also served by DB long-distance trains, but left out Düsseldorf Airport and Bremen Hbf. HKX used the freight line bypassing Bremen, reducing journey times to Hamburg. An additional stop at nearby Sagehorn was planned but never introduced. The trains called only at Osnabrück, Münster, Gelsenkirchen, Essen, Duisburg, and Düsseldorf.

On 14 March 2012 Veolia Verkehr, a subsidiary of Veolia-Transdev, signed an agreement to operate the services under contract to HKX. Veolia provided drivers and locomotives. For a time, services were operated using former Rheingold coaches hauled by leased Siemens ES 64 U2 "Taurus" type electric locos, which were planned to be replaced by refurbished Class 4010 type trainsets formerly owned by ÖBB.

From December 2015 onwards, the coaches were from Bahn Touristik Express, which also operated the trains under contract to HKX. The locomotive was still a leased ES 64 U2 "Taurus". Services ran at speeds of up to 160 km/h.

== Company's founders ==
RDC Deutschland GmbH (75%) is based in Berlin and is a 100% subsidiary of the Railroad Development Corporation (RDC). RDC is a Pittsburgh-based railway investment and management company founded in 1987 by Henry Posner III and Robert A. Pietrandrea which has invested in railway operations all over the world. Locomore rail GmbH & CO. KG (17.5%) is a railway traffic enterprise in Berlin with the focus on long-distance traffic. Michael Schabas (7.5%) is a railway investor in London.

== Management ==
Eva Kreienkamp, CEO and CFO, was responsible for business development, strategy, marketing, sales and communication, finances, controlling, legal issues, purchase, and human resources, and was also managing director, RDC Deutschland GmbH. In June 2014, she left the company. Carsten Carstensen, COO, responsible for railway operations and service operation, took over the CEO post after Kreienkamp left, and had been managing director of Locomore Rail GmbH until 2012.

== See also ==
- Locomore
