= Barker Fairley =

British-Canadian painter and scholar of German literature

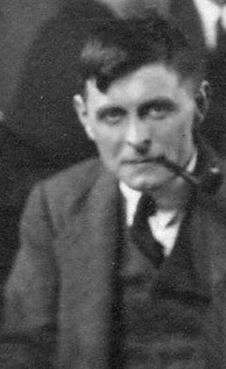
- Barker Fairley with the Group of Seven, Arts and Letters Club, Toronto, 1920.
- Born: May 21, 1887; Barnsley, Yorkshire, England
- Died: October 11, 1986 (aged 99); Toronto, Ontario, Canada
- Citizenship: Canadian

Barker Fairley, OC RCA (May 21, 1887 – October 11, 1986) was a British-Canadian painter, and scholar who made a significant contribution to the study of German literature, particularly for the work of Goethe, and was an early champion and friend of the Group of Seven and founder of The Canadian Forum magazine.

== Life and work ==
Although educated and raised within a strong European tradition, Fairley conducted his most significant scholarship in German literature and art criticism in Canada, focusing on Canadian art and culture. His perspectives and writings had a profound influence on the emerging academic and artistic scene in his adopted country.

Fairley was born in Barnsley, Yorkshire and died, a Canadian citizen, in his home in Toronto, Ontario, Canada. He was educated at Leeds, and in 1907 was granted a Ph.D. from Jena University in Germany. His first academic appointment was at Jena. Between 1910 and 1915, he joined the faculty at the newly founded University of Alberta in Edmonton. He joined the University of Toronto's German department in 1915 where he taught until the end of his career as a professor.

In 1949, he was invited to Bryn Mawr College to deliver lectures on the German poet Johann Wolfgang von Goethe, but was barred entry by the U.S. Department of Justice. He later compiled the texts of the abortive lectures into six essays on Faust. He retired in 1957.

In 1978, he was made an Officer of the Order of Canada for his "unique contribution to Canadian scholarship".

Barker Fairley spent almost all of his professional artistic life in Ontario, where he was also mentor and teacher to Charles Meanwell and Vincent Thomas. Many of his paintings are still owned by the University of Toronto and are in the Art Museum, University of Toronto, Hart House collection. He began to paint in 1931 through the encouragement of Robert Finch. In his use of colour and form, the effect of the Group of Seven is evident. His critical approach and activism regarding the Group of Seven contributed to their acceptance in Canadian Art, and his scholarly influence over University College at the University of Toronto left a strong and lasting impression.

His first wife, Margaret Fairley, was a notable Canadian political activist. His daughter Ann (Fairley) Schabas was dean of the Faculty of Library and Information Science at the University of Toronto. Her husband is musician Ezra Schabas, former dean of the Royal Conservatory of Music in Toronto. Barker Fairley's grandchildren include academics William Schabas, Margaret Schabas, and lawyer Paul Schabas.

== Quotes ==
Ought not the painting of humanity ... draw ahead of the landscape, ... take priority over it? Ought it not do so in any age and especially in this age of intense human conflict and suffering and innovation? There is everything in the world about us, the world of today, to suggest that the luxury of dwelling on empty landscapes is likely to recede in men's minds and the urgent human issues to assert themselves with growing force.

— "Canadian Art: Man vs. Landscape" The Canadian Forum December 1939

What is needed then ... is to set the whole subject matter of art free and not just the landscape part of it. It is the human subject, the human face, the human figure whether alone or in groups or in crowds, in town and country, in war in peace, in life and death, that is the real and central subject of art ....

— "What is Wrong with Canadian Art" Canadian Art magazine, Autumn 1948

== Other honours ==
- Royal Canadian Academy of Arts
