= DB Fernverkehr =

German long-distance passenger train operator

DB Fernverkehr AG
- Type: joint-stock company
- Industry: Rail transport
- Founded: 1999
- Headquarters: Frankfurt, Germany
- Area served: Europe
- Key people: Michael Peterson (Chairman)
- Services: long distance rail services
- Owner: Deutsche Bahn
- Number of employees: 19,000 (2024)
- Website: deutschebahn.com

DB Fernverkehr AG (German pronunciation: [deːbeː ˈfɛʁnfɛɐˌkeːɐ], "DB Long-Distance Traffic") is a semi-independent division of Deutsche Bahn that operates long-distance passenger trains in Germany. It was founded in 1999 in the second stage of the privatisation of Deutsche Bahn, under the name of DB Reise&Touristik and was renamed in 2003. As of 2024, DB Fernverkehr operates approximately 800 domestic and 250 international train services per day, utilizing 500 trainsets.

Heavily indebted, its frequent malfunctions (outdated infrastructure, issues with punctuality and breakdowns, slow lines, overcrowded trains, poor communication) have been the subject of intense debate in German and European public opinion for several years.

== History ==
The company emerged as DB Reise & Touristik AG on 1 January 1999 in the context of the second stage of the railway reform from the division of long-distance transport of Deutsche Bahn. It traded under this name until 2003.

Instead of the expected five, only 2.2 million passengers used the long-distance trains in traffic to the Expo 2000. Instead of the expected DM 400 million, only DM 125 million was generated. In mid-January 2001, the company announced plans to create a standard of comfort and quality at the ICE level with investments amounting to DM 2 billion. Among other things, 28 additional ICE Ts (around 800 million DM) and 13 more ICE 3s (around 500 million DM) were procured and the modernization of 117 locomotive-bound IC kits (500 million DM) was promised. Also in 2001, it was decided to externally adapt all long-distance passenger coaches to the color scheme of the ICE trains (light gray with red stripes).

From 2009 to 2012, the company reduced its seating capacity by 4 percent. In mid-2012, the average load factor of the trains was 48.1 percent, three percentage points higher than in the previous year. In the first half of 2012, the number of passengers increased year-on-year by more than 5 percent to 63.3 million. In 2012, the company carried 131.3 million travelers, generating 37,357 billion passenger-kilometers of traffic at 145.1 million train-kilometers. The utilization of the trains was 50.3 percent.

In mid-2013, the company claimed 75 percent of its energy needs from renewable energy sources. During the 2013 flood, many routes, including the high-speed line between Hanover and Berlin, were not or only partially accessible for weeks. The company suffered heavy losses and also lost significantly in its punctuality statistics.

With a half-million travelers in one day, the company recorded a new passenger record on 23 December 2016. Between January and April 2017, a new record was set with around 45 million travelers. The year 2018 was expected with 143 million passengers and a record profit of 400 million euros expected.

As of 2023, the average occupancy rate of DB Fernverkehr's trains rose to 49.1 percent after a steep drop during the COVID-19 pandemic. In the same year, punctuality decreased from above 80 percent in the years prior to 69.6 percent, leading to widespread criticism. During the first half of 2024, punctuality decreased even further down to 62.7 percent with DB stating widespread strike action, extensive construction works and extreme weather conditions as reasons.

== Products ==
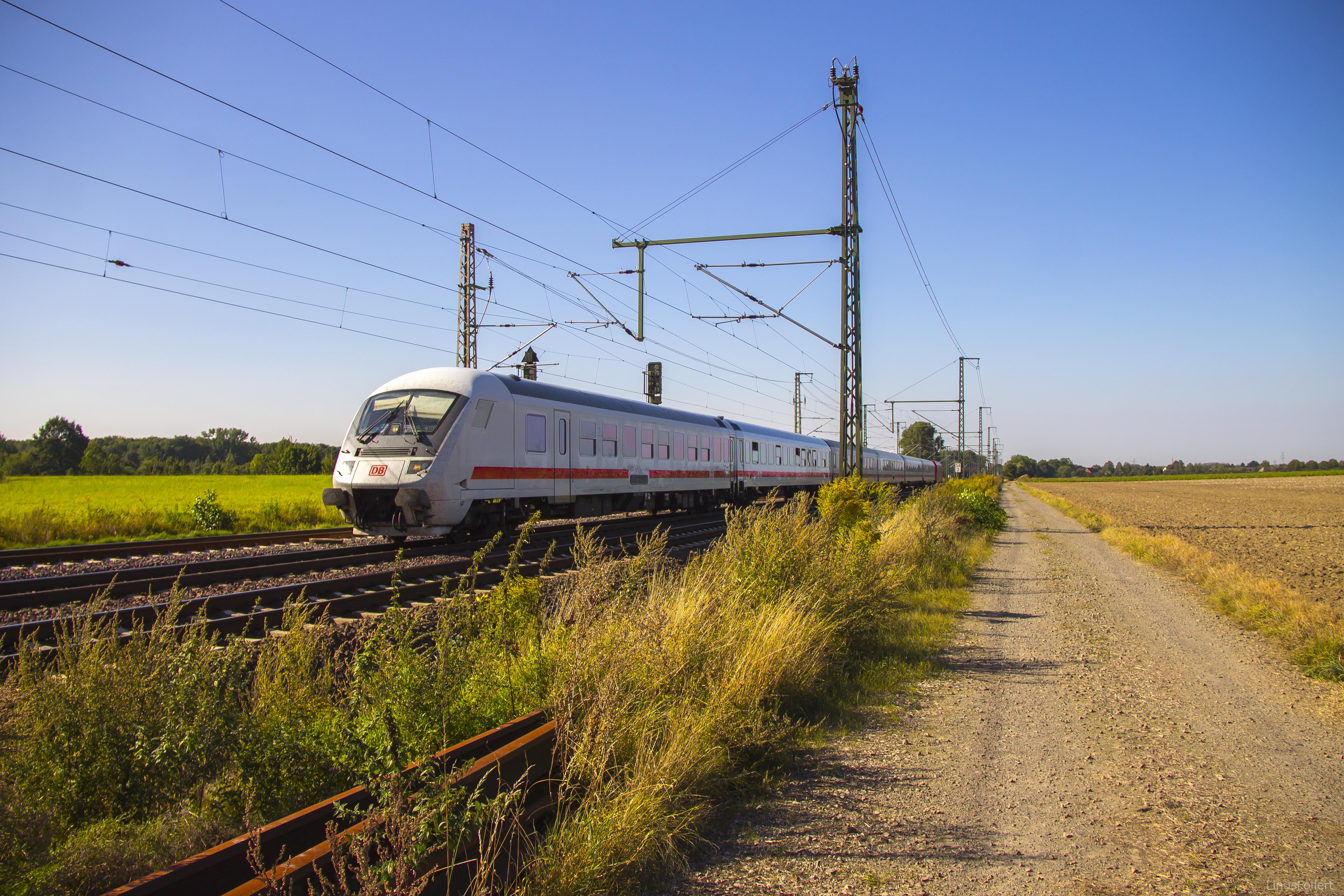
An IC operated by DB Fernverkehr.

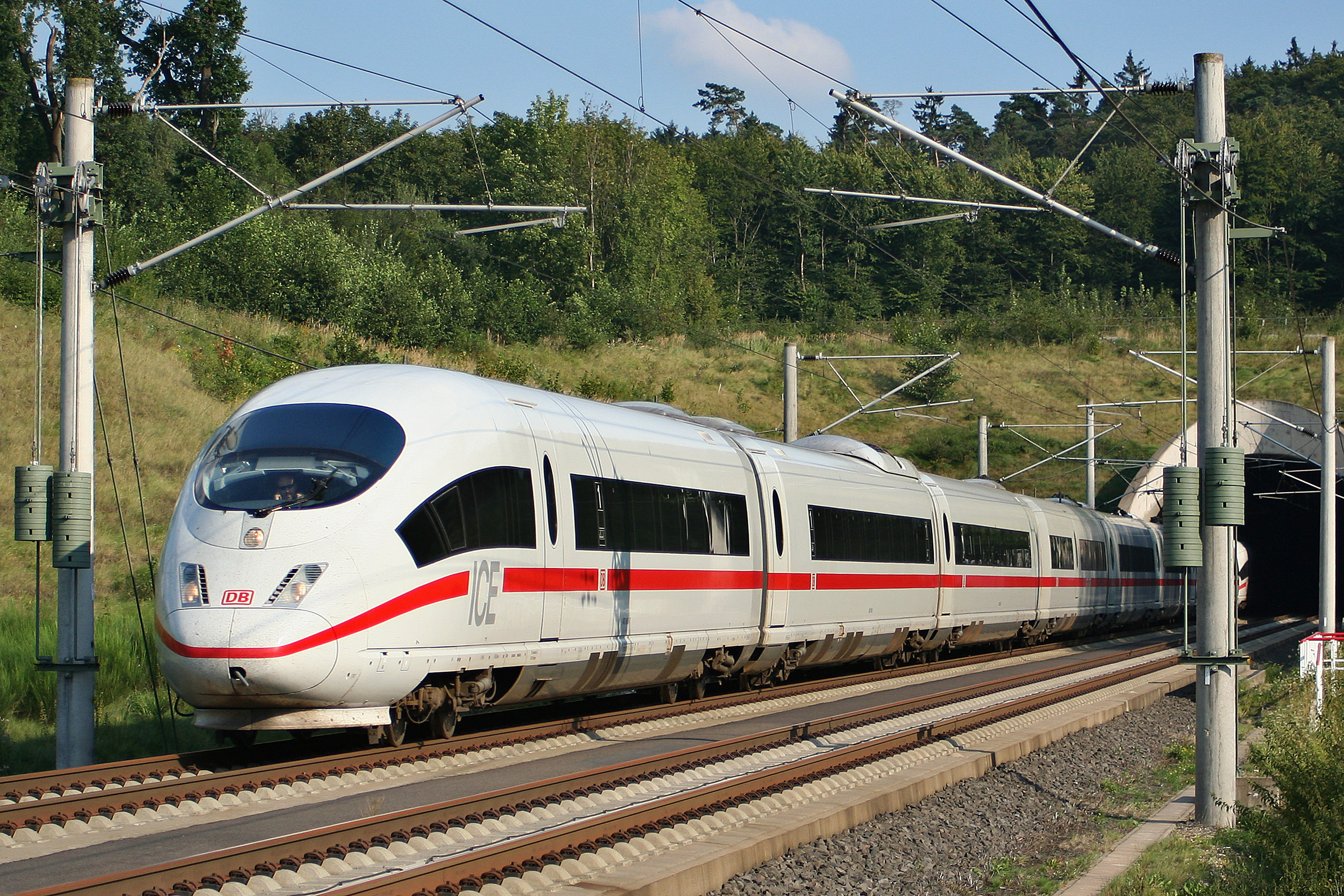
An ICE operated by DB Fernverkehr.

DB Fernverkehr provides domestic semi-fast and high-speed long distance trains throughout Germany as well as cross-border long-distance transport services to France, Belgium, the Netherlands, Austria and Switzerland with further services to Denmark, Poland and the Czech Republic jointly operated with their respective national railway companies.

DB Fernverkehr uses the following brands for all of its long-distance services:

- Intercity Express (ICE) - high-speed train services within Germany as well as to Austria, Switzerland, France, Belgium and the Netherlands using dedicated ICE trainsets.
- Intercity (IC) - semi-fast services within Germany as well as to Austria and the Netherlands using older coach rolling stock or newer dedicated double-deck trainsets.
- EuroCity (EC) - semi-fast international services mostly in cooperation with SBB, ÖBB, PKP and ČD using a mix of own and foreign coach rolling stock.
- EuroCity-Express (ECE) - dedicated German brand for EuroCity services between Germany, Switzerland and Italy with SBB and Trenitalia using high-speed trainsets.

== Subsidiaries ==
=== DB Bordgastronomie ===
In most trains of DB Fernverkehr exists a gastronomic offer in form of a "BordRestaurant" or "BordBistro". These system gastronomies are coordinated by the organizational unit DB Bordgastronomie. DB Fernverkehr also trains its own specialists in system catering, who can later prepare and serve meals on board the trains as stewards.

=== Former subsidiaries ===
==== Alleo ====
Alleo, founded in 2012 and closed in 2018, was a joint subsidiary of Deutsche Bahn and the French state railway SNCF. The company had been responsible for the marketing of the international ICE and TGV trains, which operate on the routes between Frankfurt, Paris and Marseille. In addition, the German-French train and service teams were coordinated by Alleo and trained for use on board international connections. Alleo was led by Frank Hoffmann (DB) and Emmanuel Mroz (SNCF). Since its closure, both companies still coordinate joint operations outside of this subsidiary.

==== Ameropa ====
The tour operator and travel agency Ameropa Reisen, founded in 1951, had been a wholly owned subsidiary since DB Fernverkehr AG was founded. Above all, it distributed short trips and city trips within Germany, as well as to neighboring countries, utilizing DB Fernverkehr train connections. In 2020, Ameropa has been sold.

==== DB AutoZug ====
In 1999, the subsidiary DB AutoZug GmbH, based in Dortmund, was founded for the operation of car and night trains. With October 1, 2013 DB AutoZug GmbH was merged with DB Fernverkehr AG. As of 2024, DB neither operates car nor night trains anymore.

==== IC Bus ====
Between 2013 and 2020, DB Fernverkehr AG operated long-distance coach lines under the brand name IC Bus. As of 2017, there were a total of 45 of these long-distance connections through 11 European countries. According to ex-CEO Ulrich Homburg, the IC bus offer was not primarily about price competition with other competitors, such as FlixBus, but a supplement to the railway's existing intercity network. All IC Bus routes were since gradually terminated.

== Corporate affairs ==
=== Leadership ===
DB Fernverkehr AG is a wholly owned subsidiary of Deutsche Bahn, but, in contrast to its sister company DB Regio, operates in a self-sufficient manner. The executive board of DB Fernverkehr is made up of Michael Peterson (CEO), Anja Schöllmann (operations board member), Martin Jende (CHRO), Wilken Bormann (CFO) and Stefanie Berk (marketing board member).

=== Business figures ===
According to the annual report 2017, the company achieved a profit (net income) of 366 million euros. Compared to the previous year 2016 (136 million euros), the profit increased by 230 million euros (139%). 94 percent of the revenue generated DB Fernverkehr with revenue from passenger transport. The traffic volume (in passenger-kilometers) increased continuously since 2014 (36.1 billion pkm) and in 2017 was around 40.5 billion pkm.

=== Competition ===
In long-distance rail passenger transport in Germany, there are only very few private providers, Flixtrain (semi-speed low-cost services), Eurostar (formerly branded Thalys, high-speed services to Brussels and Paris), Westbahn (high-speed services to Austria) and Train4you (branded as UrlaubsExpress for seasonal night trains) being the sole competitors of DB Fernverkehr on certain routes. Further minor competitors such as Vogtlandexpress, InterConnex, Locomore and HKX ceased operations in recent years.
