= Malcolm M. Mercer =

Canadian lawyer

67th Treasurer of the Law Society
- In office 2018–2020
- Preceded by: Paul Schabas
- Succeeded by: Teresa Donnelly

Malcolm M. Mercer is a Canadian lawyer who served as Treasurer of the Law Society of Ontario from June 2018 until June 2020. He was first elected as Treasurer of the Law Society on June 28, 2018, and re-elected on June 27, 2019. The Treasurer is the highest elected official of the Law Society of Ontario, which regulates Ontario’s 50,000 lawyers and paralegals in the public interest. The Treasurer presides over Convocation, the Law Society’s governing board, chairing and setting the agenda for its meetings and establishing Convocation committees. The Treasurer is elected each year at the June meeting of Convocation. Treasurers generally serve two terms.

In November 2020, Mercer was appointed Chair of the Law Society Tribunal for a four year term.

Mercer was the 2013 recipient of the Louis St-Laurent Award of Excellence from the Canadian Bar Association (CBA); conferred once annually, it is the highest member achievement of the CBA. He has B.Sc. and LL.B. degrees from the University of Toronto (1977, 1982) and was a partner in the Litigation Group at McCarthy Tétrault in Toronto. His civil litigation practice focused on commercial and corporate matters and professional negligence. Mercer retired from the firm in 2020. Mercer is a past Chair of the Victorian Order of Nurses Canada, along with numerous Law Society and professional designations. He is also an adjunct professor at Osgoode Hall Law School at York University, where he teaches legal ethics.

== Awards and honours ==
- 2013: received the Louis St-Laurent Award of Excellence from the Canadian Bar Association
- 2014: recognized as one of "Canada's Top 25 Most Influential Lawyers" by Canadian Lawyer magazine
