= Markus Hunkel =

German transport executive and investor

- Born: 1972 (age 53–54)
- Education: Technische Universität Darmstadt; Queen Mary and Westfield College
- Occupation: rail transport executive
- Years active: 1997‒present
- Known for: DB Schenker Rail; Railroad Development Corporation Deutschland
- Children: 2

Markus Hunkel (born 1972) is a German transport executive. Hunkel was COO of DB Schenker Rail, before becoming CEO of Railroad Development Corporation-Deutschland in Germany.

== Education ==
Hunkel studied at the Technical University of Darmstadt in Germany and at Queen Mary and Westfield College in London.

While working for Deutsche Bahn, Hunkel received a doctorate from the Technical University of Darmstadt for publication of "Segment-oriented price differentiation for transport services" ("Segmentorientierte Preisdifferenzierung für Verkehrsdienstleistungen") during 2001.

Hunkel gave a guest lecture about DB's sustainability strategy at TU Darmstadt in 2023.

== Employment ==
In 1997 Hunkel began working for the German railway company Deutsche Bahn (DB).

By 2008 Hunkel was Leader of Strategy for Transport and Logistics at DB.

From June 2011 until November 2015 Hunkel was Chief of Production (COO) at DB Schenker Rail. Hunkel took over from the previous COO Christian Kuhl and stayed in the post until Clemens Först took over in December 2015. Under Hunkel, DB Schenker Rail replaced 13 separate systems with a new single system for organising freight across the European market.

At a signing ceremony in the Gotthard Base Tunnel in September 2015 Hunkel extended DB Schenker Rail's contract with SBB Cargo for haulage via the Gotthard railway and Lötschberg railway routes through the Swiss Alps.

Beginning in April 2017 Hunkel took over management of Railroad Development Corporation Deutschland.

In 2024 Hunkel was appointed by the German Federal Ministry for Transport to Sektorbeirat, the new combined advisory board of DB InfraGO.

== Personal life ==
Hunkel is an underwater diver and underwater photographer.

== Publications ==
- Hunkel, Markus (2001-07-27). Segmentorientierte Preisdifferenzierung für Verkehrsdienstleistungen [Segment-oriented price differentiation for transport services] (in German). Wiesbaden: Springer Fachmedien. doi:10.1007/978-3-322-90380-8. ISBN 978-3-8244-7447-9.
