= Margaret Fairley =

Canadian writer, educator, and political activist (1885–1968)

- Born: Margaret Adele Keeling; 1885; Bradford, Yorkshire, United Kingdom
- Died: 1968 (aged 82–83); Toronto, Ontario, Canada
- Other name: Margaret Adele Fairley
- Education: University of Alberta
- Political party: Communist Party of Canada (1936–1968)
- Spouse: Barker Fairley
- Relatives: Dorothy Keeling (sister); Ezra Schabas (son-in-law); William Schabas (grandson); Margaret Schabas (granddaughter)

Margaret Adele Fairley (née Keeling; 1885–1968) was a British-born Canadian writer, educator, and political activist. From 1936 to her death, she was a member of the Communist Party of Canada. She was deported from the USA for her politics and there is a park named for her in Toronto.

== Life ==
Margaret was born in Bradford, Yorkshire, United Kingdom Her mother was Henrietta Frances (born Gedge), and her father was the Reverend William Hulton Keeling who transformed Northampton and Bradford Grammar School. Her elder sister was Dorothy Keeling a leading social worker.

At a time that the university did not grant degrees to women, she studied at Oxford and finished with a "first" in English. She became tutor in English at St Hilda's College and in 1912 was appointed advisor to women students at the University of Alberta in Edmonton, Alberta. Canada. She held the position only for a year before marrying Barker Fairley, a fellow Yorkshireman and professor of modern languages. The University of Alberta granted her a Bachelor of Arts degree. After the birth of Joan (Hall) and Tom, the family moved to Toronto, where they had Elizabeth, William, and Ann (Schabas), and she lived there until her death.

Her first book was an edition of poems (Coleridge Poems, 1794-1807, published in 1910). It includes a 49-page biographical essay introducing Coleridge "as a Poet of Nature and Romance." She was editor from 1952 to 1956 of New Frontiers, a journal published by the Labor-Progressive Party of Canada, and two other books:

- The Spirit of Canadian Democracy (1946)
- Selected Writings of William Lyon Mackenzie (1960)

She moved in the same intellectual circles as the historian Stanley Ryerson and rge poet Dorothy Livesay.

In 1949, while attending the Cultural and Scientific Conference for World Peace at the Waldorf-Astoria Hotel in New York City, she was deported from the United States. She died in Toronto at the age of 82.

On June 23, 1972, the City of Toronto named a park after her at the corner of Brunswick Avenue and Ulster Street and provided a plaque with her name on a granite boulder. Later, family and friends raised the money to erect a bronze bust.

Some of her manuscripts are in the collection of the Thomas Fisher Rare Book Library, University of Toronto.

Her son-in-law is the musician Ezra Schabas, and her grandson is the academic William Schabas, as is her granddaughter Margaret Schabas.
