= The Spirit of Canadian Democracy =

1945 Canadian-language book edited by Margate Fairley

- First edition
- Author: Margaret Fairley
- Publisher: Progress Books
- Publication date: 1946

The Spirit of Canadian Democracy is a 1946 book edited by Margaret Fairley. It has been called "a stirring canonical reconstruction of Canadian literature as popular and national resistance."
