= Autozug Sylt =

Car shuttle train service between Sylt and Germany

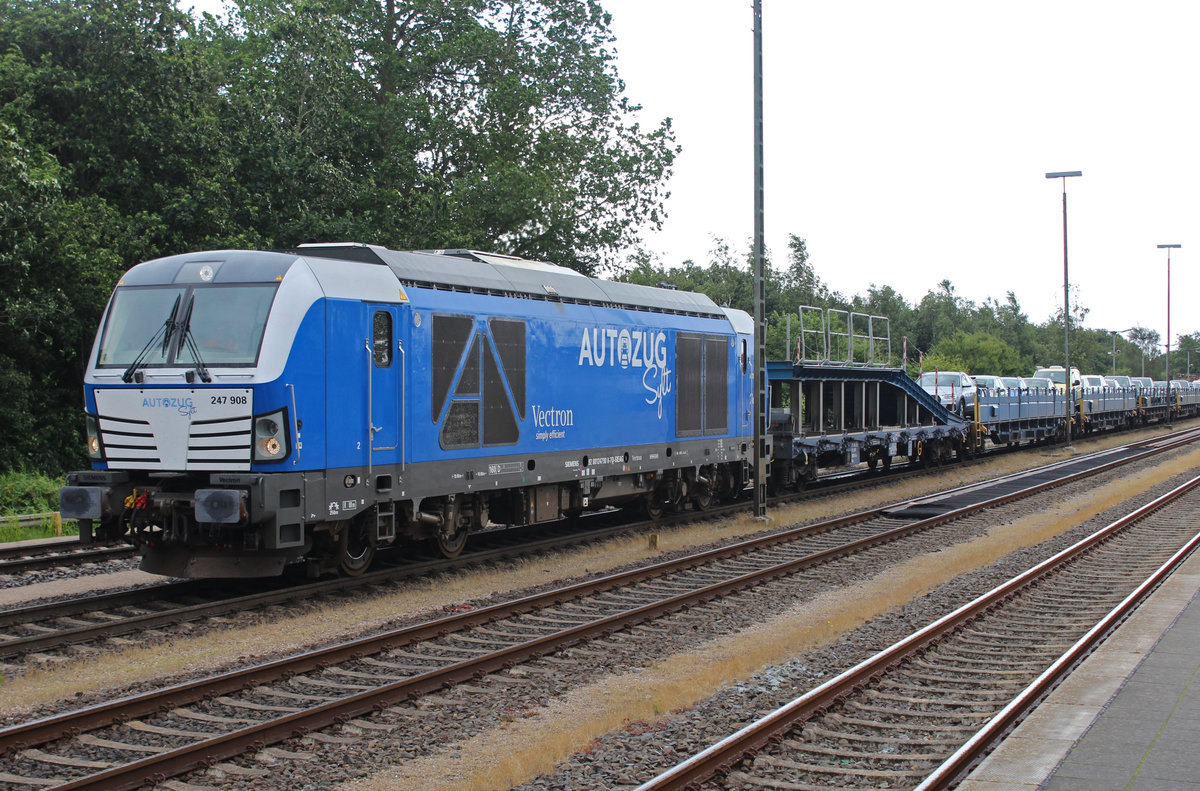
- Main regions: Island of Sylt; Schleswig-Holstein
- Fleet: Locomotives; 2 Siemens Vectron DE; >42 Wagons: Ramp; Intermediate; Loading
- Stations called at: Niebüll terminal; Westerland terminal
- Parent company: Railroad Development Corporation

Other
- Website: autozug-sylt.de

The Autozug Sylt is a car shuttle train connecting the isle of Sylt with the mainland of Germany. The train is one of two shuttle operators carrying trucks and cars over the Hindenburg Dam across Wadden Sea, between the loading terminals at Niebüll station and Westerland (Sylt) station. The train service was started by Railroad Development Corporation in 2016, to compete with the existing DB AutoZug service on the same route.

Initially pricing began at €25‒€45 per direction, with a plan of seven round-trips per day.

By September 2025 the service had transported two million vehicles.

Vehicles drive on to flat wagons, each of which is specially adapted with emergency brakes, speakers, and fire extinguishers. From 2018 work started on readying an additional fleet of 42 transport wagons, which were approved for service starting in June 2019.

== Background ==
The rail route between Niebüll and Sylt is 39.3 kilometres (24 mi) long, of which 22.2 kilometres (14 mi) is single track. As of 2015 the route still used manual semaphore signalling. In 2014, the existing operator DB AutoZug Sylt Shuttle had been carrying an estimated 960,000 vehicles per year.

The initial concepts for the Blue Autozug Sylt had been sketched by Carsten Carstensen in 2008. By 2014, both RDC Germany and the state of Schleswig-Holstein had applied for train paths.

In November 2015, the Federal Railway Authority (EBA) authorised seven additional seven train paths for RDC's Autozug Sylt on the route.

In December 2017, RDC ordered two Siemens Vectron DE (Diesel) locomotives for the Autozug Sylt services, fitted with MTU engines.

On 18 January 2026 Carsten Carstensen, the director of Autozug Sylt died of cancer.
