= Martin Pavlik =

German historian and train conductor

- Martin Pavlík
- Born: 1983 or 1984 (age 41–42); Geislingen an der Steige
- Education: Dorfen Gymnasium
- Alma mater: Slavic studies, LMU Munich
- Occupations: Historian; Train conductor
- Employers: Deutsche Bahn; Bahntouristikexpress
- Spouse: Angelika (m. 2010)
- Children: 2

Martin Pavlík is a historian and train conductor based in Bavaria, Germany. He is notable for his work supporting refugees following the 2022 Russian invasion of Ukraine.

== Early life ==
Pavlík's parents emigrated from Bratislava to Germany as political refugees. Martin Pavlík was born in Geislingen an der Steige, where his father worked as a doctor. After four years he moved to Taufkirchen (Vils) in Upper Bavaria, and attended the gymnasium school in Dorfen. Pavlík gained a scholarship from the Hanns Seidel Foundation and proceeded to study political science in Munich. As a researcher he had visited the Chernobyl exclusion zone around the Chernobyl nuclear power plant in 2009. In 2010, Pavlík received a master’s degree in Slavic studies, Politics, and History from LMU Munich.

In 2010, he married Angelika, who had previously attended the same school in Dorfen.

== Railway career ==
Following his studies at LMU Munich, Pavlík worked as a night train attendant, and later train conductor (Zugführer) on overnight trains from Munich to Venice, to Amsterdam, and to Zagreb. By 2016, he had a collection of notebooks documenting over 400 train journeys. When Deutsche Bahn closed its City Night Line train network in 2016, Pavlík transferred to the private night train operator BahnTouristikExpress

During the Ukrainian refugee crisis in 2022 Pavlík worked as a train conductor on special refugee trains between Frankfurt (Oder) station and Hannover Messe/Laatzen station—next to the Hannover Messe refugee centre. In 2023 Pavlík was part of a railway delegation that visited Ukraine.

=== Refugee support ===
After the end of the refugee train operation, Pavlík began to intensively assist Ukrainian refugees locally in Dorfen and the surrounding area.

In 1993, Pavlik had become an altar server at the Taufkirchen St. Paul's Catholic Church. As of 2024, Pavlik continued to be the regular altar server for Saturday Ukrainian-language church services held in Dorfen at St. Vitus Church for the Ukrainian community in Germany.

== Engagement ==
As of 2009, Pavlík remained secretary of the Taufkirchen section of the German Life Saving Association (DLRG). At the start of 2014, Pavlík was elected to the board of the Alumni association of the Dorfen Gymnasium school, and at the 50th-anniversary of the school in 2024 presented his collection of school year books. Prior to the 2015 Polish parliamentary election Pavlík had been leading student exchange programmes to Kraków for ten years, and delivered a lecture in Landshut on Poland as a normal neighboring country of Germany. As of 2018, Pavlík held dual citizenship with German plus Slovak passports, speaking seven languages; by 2022 Pavlík spoke nine languages.

On 20 March 2023, Pavlik was a guest on the BR Heimat series Habe die Ehre!, being interviewed by Johannes Hitzelberger.

== Publications ==
- Pavlik, Martin (1 April 2006). "Das schlummernde Ungeheuer und seine toten Helden: Das Ukrainische Nationale Čornobyl'-Museum Kyïv" [The slumbering monster and its dead heroes: The Ukrainian National Chernobyl Museum in Kyiv] (PDF). Zeitgeschichte. Kurzanalysen und Informationen (in German) (25). East European Studies Institution, Regensburg: 1‒6. ISSN 2366-2700.
- Pavlik, Martin (31 August 2008). "Rote Globalisierung und Schwarze Genossen. Die Afrikapolitik der ČSSR gegenüber Angola, Moçambique und Namibia" [Red Globalization and Black Comrades: Czechoslovakia's African Policy towards Angola, Mozambique, and Namibia] (PDF). Historische Abteilung. Kurzanalysen und Informationen (in German). East European Studies Institution, Regensburg.
- Pavlik, Martin (31 May 2010). Hagemeister, Michael; Schulze Wessel, Martin (eds.). Die slowakischen Auslandsvertretungen im südlichen Subsahara-Afrika (1993‒1998) [Slovak diplomatic missions in sub-Saharan Africa (1993‒1998)]. Forschungskolloquium zur osteuropäischen Geschichte (in German). Munich.
- Pavlik, Martin (2011). "Bratislava als slowakischer Erinnerungsort" [Bratislava as a Slovak remembrance site]. In Weber, Matthias [in German]; Petranský, Ivan [in Czech]; Olschowsky, Burkhard; Pók, Attila [in Hungarian]; Przewoznik, Andrzej (eds.). Erinnerungsorte in Ostmitteleuropa: Erfahrungen der Vergangenheit und Perspektiven [Sites of remembrance in East Central Europe: Experiences of the past and perspectives]. Schriften des Bundesinstitut für Kultur und Geschichte der Deutschen im östlichen Europa (in German). Vol. 42. Oldenburg: BKGE. pp. 71‒82, 387. ISBN 978-3-486-70244-6.
- Pavlik, Martin (14 July 2013). "Integrationspolitik" [Integration policy]. In Glaab, Manuela [in German]; Weigel, Michael [in German] (eds.). Politik und Regieren in Bayern [Politics and governance in Bavaria] (in German). Wiesbaden: Springer Publishing. pp. 429‒439, 442. doi:10.1007/978-3-531-93414-3_23. ISBN 978-3-531-16037-5. "Seit 2012 ist er Zugführer bei der Deutsehen Bahn."
