= Locomore =

- Main region: Germany
- Fleet: 14 carriages (one train)
- Stations called at: 18
- Parent company: Locomore GmbH & Co. KG

Locomore (identifier LOC) was a German railway company that operated a higher-speed inter-city rail open access service between four of the most populous German metropolitan areas in 2016-2017 i.e. the Stuttgart Metropolitan Region, Rhine-Neckar, Frankfurt Rhine-Main and Berlin-Brandenburg. The service stopped at 18 railway stations, including the major German cities of Stuttgart, Frankfurt, Hanover and Berlin. It operated at a top speed of 200 kilometres per hour (125 mph).

The financially self-reliant Locomore passenger rail service was run by its crowdfunded parent company, Locomore GmbH & Co. KG, a privately owned German railway passenger company headquartered in Berlin.

Locomore competed with express coach bus operators such as FlixBus and the state-owned German passenger long-distance train operator, Deutsche Bahn. The company was considered a low-cost passenger rail service provider. It advertised always selling its tickets at less than half the price of the standard fare for Deutsche Bahn tickets.

== History ==
Locomore GmbH & Co. KG was founded in 2007 and in 2009 was a founding member of the Hamburg-Köln-Express GmbH, which launched the Hamburg-Köln-Express in 2012 in direct competition with the Deutsche Bahn between Hamburg and Cologne. In 2012, Locomore sold its holdings in Hamburg-Köln-Express GmbH to concentrate on launching its own rail service in competition with Deutsche Bahn.

=== Financing ===
Since June 2015, Locomore had raised funds through a crowdfunding campaign, allowing private individuals to invest in the company via pledges and donations. As of 6 December 2015, Locomore had received €608,761 in investments, largely exceeding their funding goal of €460,000. Investors can choose between receiving interest payments on their donation of 3.5% per annum and receiving travel vouchers for use on the service. On 26 January 2016 the company announced that they had successfully raised the capital necessary to launch the train service.

=== Insolvency ===
On 11 May 2017, Locomore announced that it had filed for insolvency in district court. Service was terminated as new investors could not be found to keep the railroad company operational.

=== Continuation of the service by LEO Express - Flixtrain ===
In August 2017 Czech open access train operator LEO Express acquired some Locomore assets including its leased rolling stock and the majority of the staff and the brand. LEO Express continues to operate the former Locomore services while having tickets for the new services sold by the German long-distance bus company FlixBus under the FlixTrain branding.

== Concept ==
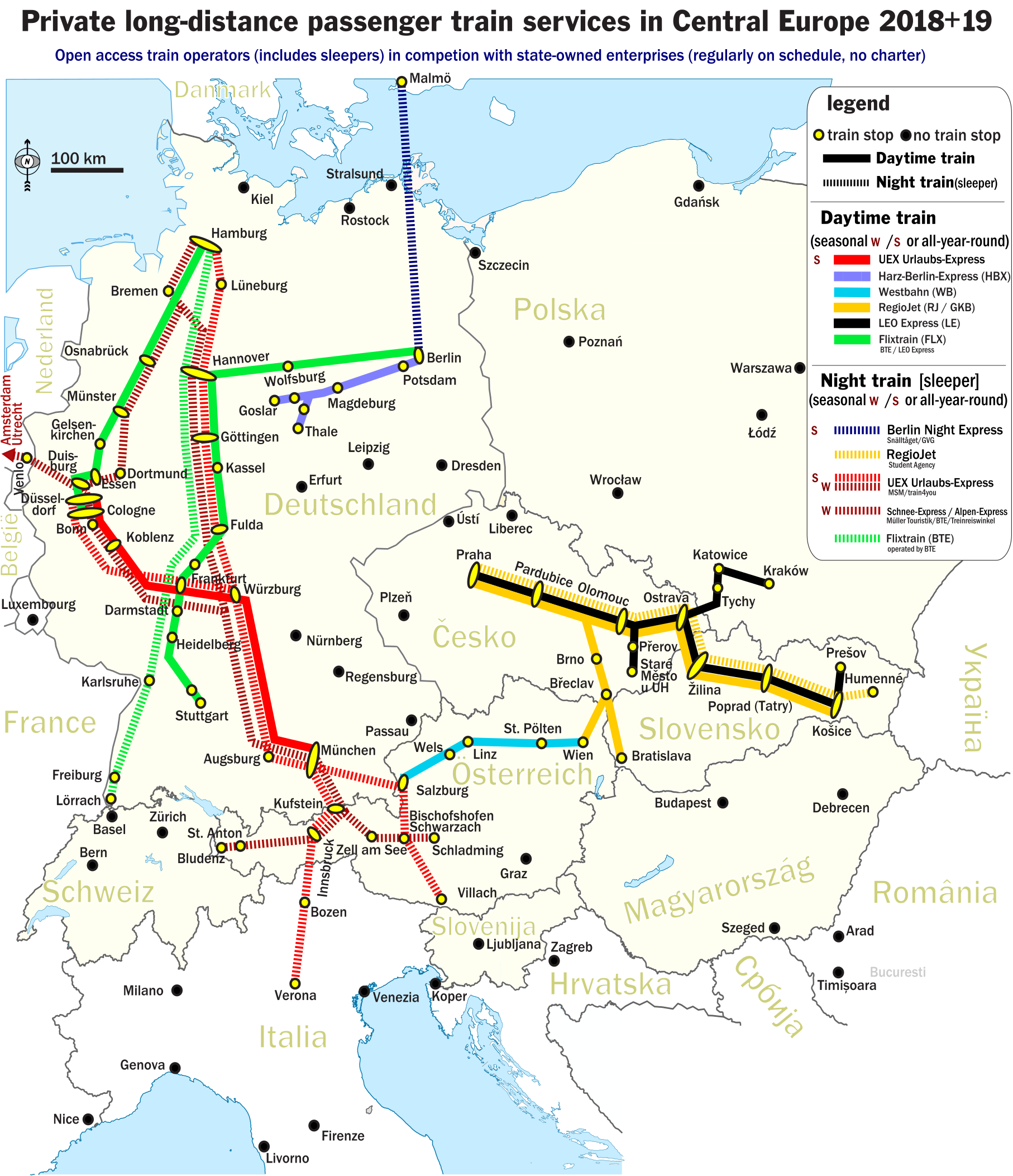
Connection map. Locomore service (through LEO Express) shown in black.

On 14 December 2016, Locomore began running a daily service between Stuttgart and Berlin. Travel time between Stuttgart Hbf and Berlin Hbf was 6:26 southbound, and 6:47 northbound. The majority of the route runs on existing German high speed lines where the service travels up to 200 km/h. In order to compete against the Deutsche Bahn's quasi-monopoly over long-distance travel in Germany, Locomore's prices were similar to those of long-distance buses, and they aim to provide a high-standard of in-seat service. The Locomore service also runs entirely on green energy.

Tickets are available for purchase online and via the Flixbus smartphone app. As is also the case for other private operators in Germany such as Hamburg-Köln-Express and Thalys, tickets are unavailable through Deutsche Bahn points of sale. Early bookers pay lower prices and could choose between multiple service levels, and all tickets were nominative and included seat reservations. Space is provided on board for pushchairs and bikes. There are themed sections for families with children; children under 14 can travel for free.

== Network ==
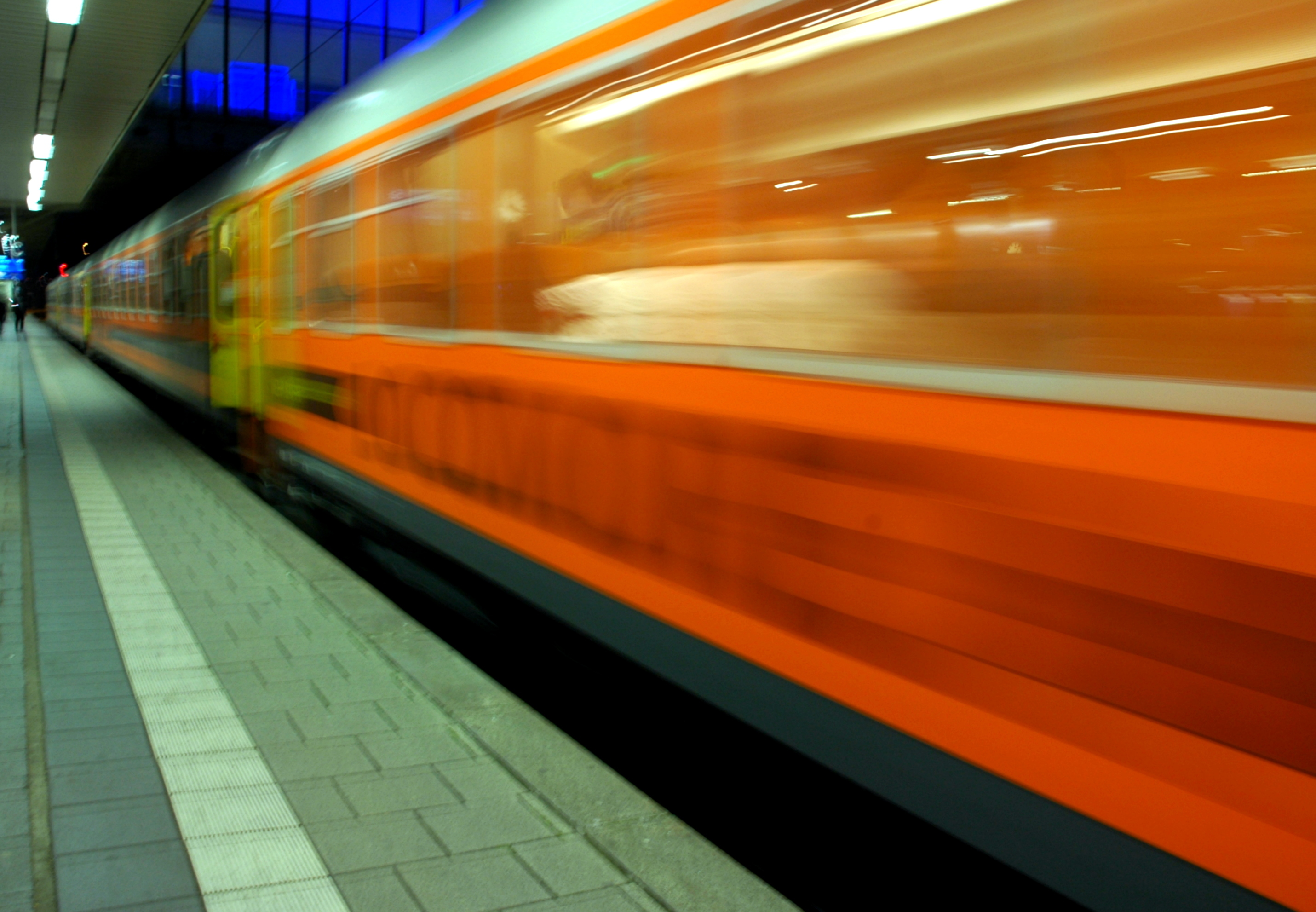
Maiden voyage from Heidelberg Hbf on 14 December 2016.

The cities Vaihingen an der Enz, Heidelberg, Darmstadt, Frankfurt am Main, Hanau, Fulda, Kassel, Göttingen, Hannover and Wolfsburg were connected with Stuttgart and Berlin. While the train only stopped at the main station in Stuttgart, the train stopped in Berlin Zoologischer Garten, Berlin-Hauptbahnhof, Berlin-Ostbahnhof and Berlin-Lichtenberg railway stations in Berlin. Since December 2017 the train also stops at Berlin-Ostkreuz and Lehrte.

Three new connections were planned for 2017: Frankfurt-Stuttgart-Augsburg-München, Berlin-Hannover-Dortmund-Düsseldorf-Köln-Bonn and Berlin-Prenzlau-Stralsund-Binz.

== Owners and founders ==
The shares have been owned:

- 61,5% by CEO Derek Ladewig
- 16% by the team members Katrin Seiler, Nicolas Dietrich, Johanna Jäger, Maria Hoppe and Mark Peter Weg
- 22,5% by 15 silent partners

Other founders and employees have been Max Sigg (Marketing), Pierre Daniel Bertholdt (Business Development, Transactions) and Jan Christopher Witt (Operations)

== Vehicles ==
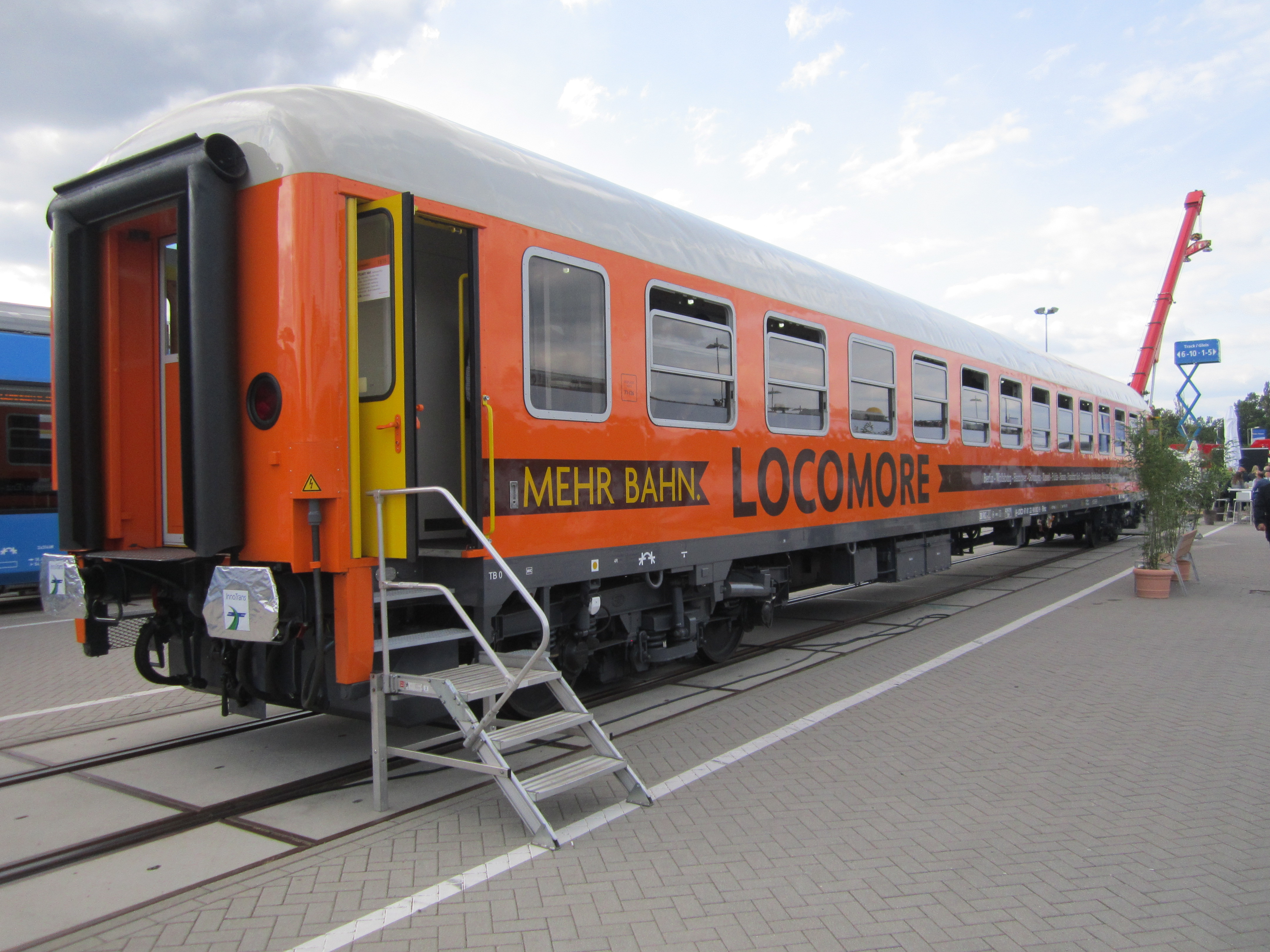
Wagons of type Bmz 3, presented at the InnoTrans 2016

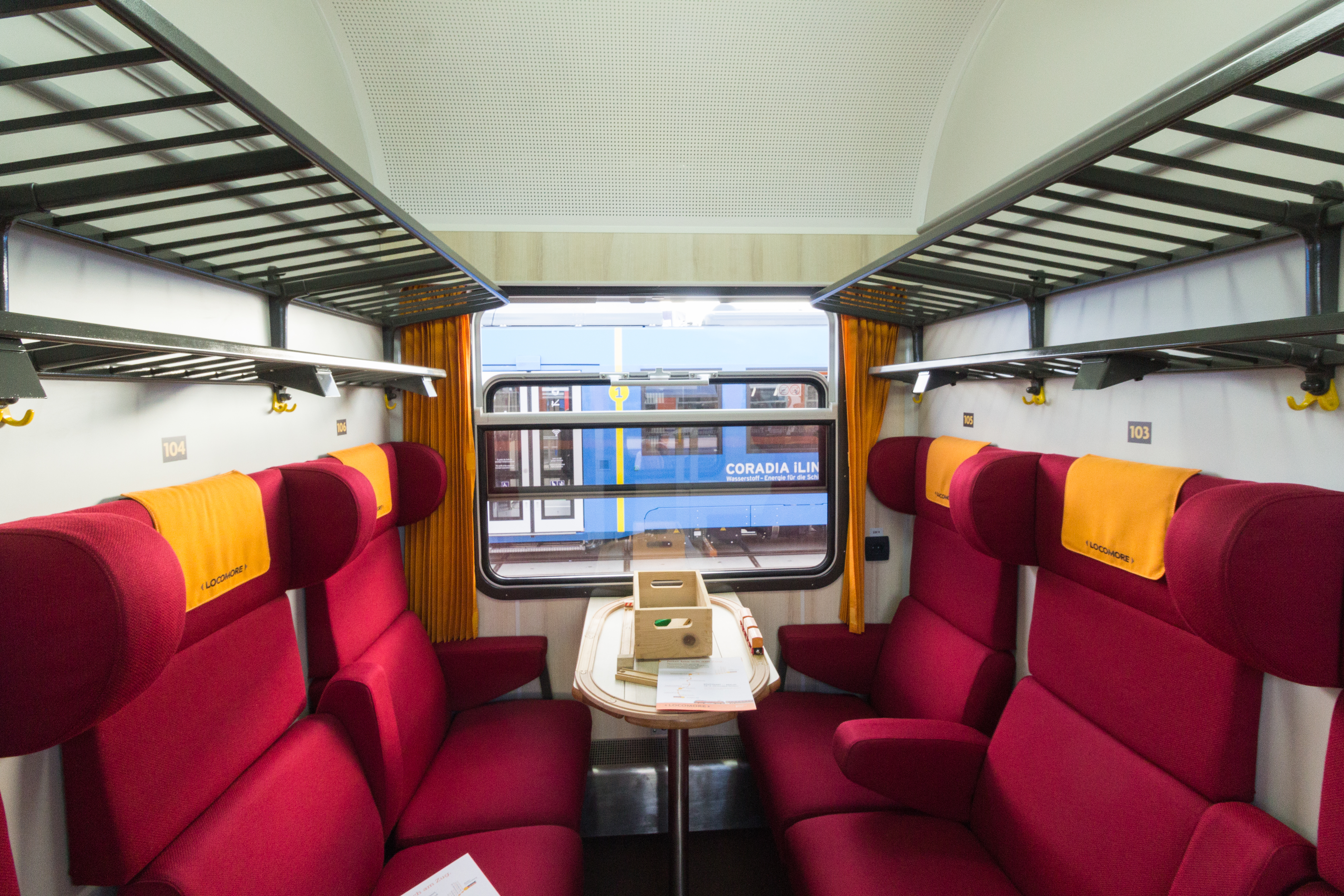
Themed section

Bm235 type UIC X passenger coaches with 12 passenger compartments are used. The coaches were used in the Netherlands up until 2009. All carriages had free Wi-Fi.

There are three passenger carriage variants:

- Bmz 1: Air conditioned with a main open seating area and seven compartments
- Bmz 2: Utility wagon (bikes, pushchairs, family section, children's play area, wheelchair section, food preparation)
- Bmz 3: Compartment coach with 12 passenger compartments. Not air conditioned.

The wagons are certified for a top speed of 200 km/h. They were leased from owner SRI Rail Invest GmbH. The locomotives and drivers are provided by Hector Rail. A Siemens ES64U2 with a top speed of 230 km/h was used.

== Food ==
An in-seat trolley service of snacks, hot and cold drinks, and small meals (salads, sandwiches) was available. Refreshment choices were Fair Trade and organic where possible.
