= Frederic D'Aeth =

British social administrator, lecturer and author

Frederic George D'Aeth (1875 – 1940) was a British social administrator, lecturer and author of books on social matters, whose work particularly in Liverpool "played a key role in winning for the city its status as the flagship of social advance in the early twentieth century".

== Early life and education ==
D'Aeth was born at 4, Hyde Side Terrace, Edmonton, Middlesex, the fourth of seven children of bank clerk Alfred D'Aeth and Elizabeth (née Gosling). The D'Aeths were of Huguenot origin (from Ath), having come to England to farm in Suffolk in the late eighteenth century. Educated at the Mercers' School, D'Aeth started work as a clerk at the National Assurance Company aged 15, where his apprenticeship allowed him to learn business administration and bookkeeping. He took up independent study with the goal of becoming a clergyman, subsequently attending King's College London classes part-time, then, in 1896, went up to Oxford as a non-collegiate student at the same time as studying theology at St Stephen's House. D'Aeth completed his Oxford studies in 1899, receiving a third-class BA in theology.

== In holy orders ==
Having left Oxford, later that year D'Aeth was ordained a deacon, and admitted in that role to Manchester Cathedral, working also as curate of St Matthew's Church, Habergham Eaves, Burnley, Lancashire. He was ordained a priest in 1901. His experience of the hardships encountered by his parishioners and the local community led to his life-long commitment to the concept of community as central to social progress. In 1902, he was appointed curate of St Margaret's, Leytonstone, in a poverty-stricken area of the East End of London. The duties of the clergy here primarily related to relief of poverty; D'Aeth was dismayed by the scale of the deprivation experienced by the local people. He described it as "a collection of streets and rows of houses... without cohesion, without name, without identity...".

== Social administration and academia ==
By 1905, disillusioned by the church's attitude to poverty, D'Aeth (at the same time as his vicar) abandoned his clerical career, taking an appointment as junior lecturer at Liverpool University. He was the first paid lecturer in the newly formed School for Social Work Training. D'Aeth was integral to the development of the School as a centre for training. In 1909, D'Aeth became Director of Reports for the Liverpool Council for Voluntary Aid, in which position he ably co-ordinated diverse charitable organisations both within Liverpool and farther afield, in "the pioneering use of outstanding social administration skills".

His writings include Present Tendencies of Class Differentiation (1910), The Liverpool Social Worker's Handbook (1913), The Unit of Social Organisation in a Large Town (1914), and The Juvenile Adult Problem (1917).

== Personal life ==
D'Aeth and his wife Margaret had two sons: Christopher John (1910–1931), who after Rugby and Balliol College, Oxford (where he read chemistry) died of exposure during a snowstorm whilst serving as ornithologist on a ten-man expedition to the uninhabited island of Akpatok, beyond Labrador in the Hudson Strait; and Andrew Maynard (b. 1913), who also attended Rugby and Balliol.

== Works cited ==
- Simey, Margaret; Bingham, David (2005). From rhetoric to reality: a study of the work of F.G. D'Aeth, social administrator. Liverpool: Liverpool University Press. ISBN 978-0-85323-759-4.
