= William Schabas =

Canadian academic (born 1950)

William Schabas OC
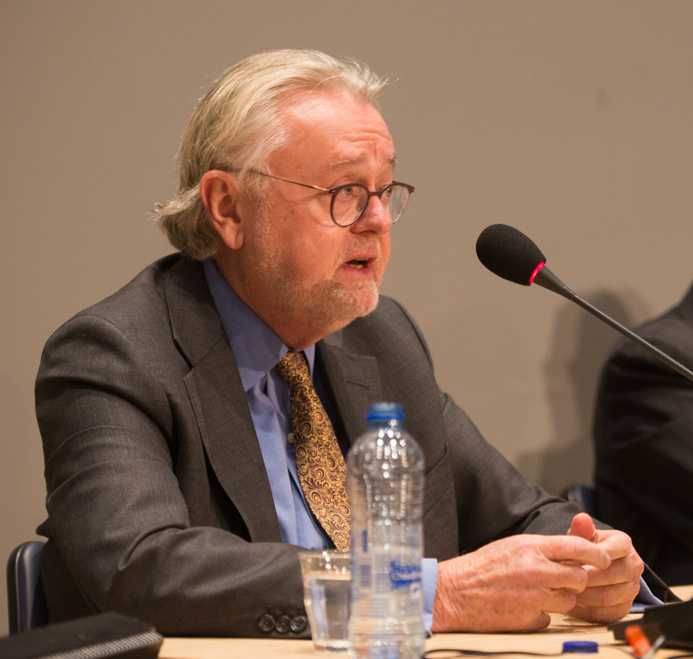
- Born: William Anthony Schabas; 19 November 1950 (age 76); Cleveland, Ohio, U.S.
- Education: University of Toronto (BA, MA); University of Montreal (LLB, LLM, LLD)

William Anthony Schabas, OC (born 19 November 1950) is a Canadian academic specialising in international criminal and human rights law. He is professor of international law at Middlesex University in the United Kingdom, professor of international human law and human rights at Leiden University in the Netherlands, and an internationally respected expert on human rights law, genocide and the death penalty.

Schabas also sits on the advisory board of the Israel Law Review, the Journal of International Criminal Justice and is editor-in-chief of Criminal Law Forum, the quarterly journal of the International Society for the Reform of Criminal Law. He is a member of the board of trustees of the United Nations Voluntary Fund for Technical Cooperation in the Field of Human Rights. Schabas served as one of seven commissioners on the Sierra Leone Truth and Reconciliation Commission, and as one of six commissioners on the Iran Tribunal Truth Commission from 18 to 22 June 2012.

In 2014, Schabas was appointed the head of a UN Committee investigating the role of Israel in the 2014 Israel–Gaza conflict. The appointment was criticized by Canada's Foreign Minister, John Baird, and the Geneva-based advocacy NGO UN Watch, on the basis of allegations that Schabas was anti-Israel, a charge he denied. In February 2015 he resigned after an Israeli complaint that he provided legal advice to the Palestine Liberation Organization in 2012. Schabas had been hired as a consultant to provide a legal analysis regarding the Palestinian bid for non-member observer status at the United Nations. Schabas stated that he was resigning to stop the controversy from overshadowing the work of the Gaza inquiry, whose results were due in March. Avigdor Lieberman hailed his resignation as an 'achievement for Israeli diplomacy'.

In late 2019, Schabas defended the nation of Myanmar at the International Court of Justice in The Hague against charges of genocide towards its Rohingya population, brought by the republic of Gambia.

== Early life and education ==
Schabas was born in Cleveland, Ohio to an Ashkenazi Jewish father. His family name, which is a variation of the Yiddish word for "Sabbath" ("Shabbos" ['ʃa.bɪs] in Yiddish, derived from "Shabbat" /ʃəˈbɑːt/ in Hebrew), has been interpreted as perhaps suggesting also a Sephardic connection. His mother, Ann (née Fairley), was born in Canada and served as dean of the Faculty of Library and Information Sciences at the University of Toronto. His father, Ezra Schabas, is an American-born Canadian musician and author. His maternal grandparents were Barker Fairley, an English-born painter and scholar, and Margaret Fairley, a writer and educator also born in England. His paternal grandparents came from Galicia, and relatives on his father's side were murdered in the Holocaust.

Ezra Schabas moved his family to Toronto in 1952; consequently, William Schabas grew up in Toronto and received his B.A. and M.A. degrees in history from the University of Toronto, and LL.B., LL.M. and LL.D. degrees from the Université de Montréal. He has also been awarded honorary doctorates by Dalhousie University, Halifax, Case Western Reserve University, Cleveland and Northwestern University, Chicago.

According to UN Watch, when Schabas was a PhD student in history at the University of Toronto in 1974, and a leader in the SDS group, he was the subject of a university investigation for allegedly violating human rights and freedoms by physically obstructing a visiting Harvard professor from speaking on campus. Schabas was suspended from the university for four years, later reduced to two.

== Career ==
From 1991 to 2000 he was a professor of human rights law and criminal law at the Université du Québec à Montréal (UQÀM), and he chaired the Department of Legal Studies from 1994 to 1998. He has taught as a visiting or adjunct professor at several other institutions, including McGill University, Queen's University Belfast, LUISS University in Rome, Cardoza Law School, Panthéon-Assas University and the National University of Rwanda.

Schabas moved to Ireland in 2000, serving as the director of the Irish Centre for Human Rights at the National University of Ireland, Galway, until 2011. That year he moved to London to take up a chair in international law at Middlesex University, London. He is the recipient of the Vespasian V. Pellat Medal for International Criminal Justice of the Association international de droit penal and the gold medal in the Social Sciences of the Royal Irish Academy. Schabas was called to the Quebec bar in 1985 and practised law in Montreal for many years. He has also practised at the international level, appearing before the International Court of Justice, the Grand Chamber of the European Court of Human Rights and the International Criminal Court. Schabas was invited by the Special Court for Sierra Leone to serve as an amicus curiae.

He has written over 18 monographs and 200 articles. In 2009 he was elected President of the International Association of Genocide Scholars. He is an Officer of the Order of Canada and a Member of the Royal Irish Academy, as well as holding a position on the board of directors of the International Institute for Criminal Investigation and René Cassin, a non-government organisation that presents a Jewish voice on human rights. Schabas has authored more than 350 academic journal articles. He has also delivered lectures or conference papers in more than fifty countries. His writings have been cited in judgments, decisions and opinions of: International Court of Justice, International Criminal Court, International Criminal Tribunal for the former Yugoslavia, International Criminal Tribunal for Rwanda, Special Court for Sierra Leone, European Court of Human Rights, Inter-American Court of Human Rights, Supreme Court of Canada, United States Supreme Court, Judicial Committee of the Privy Council, High Court of Tanzania and Supreme Court of Israel.

Schabas has participated on several human rights fact-finding missions on behalf of international non-governmental organisations, such as Amnesty International and the International Federation of Human Rights, to such countries as Rwanda, Burundi, Sudan, South Africa and Russia. The 1993 mission to Rwanda, of which he was a member, alerted the international community to the danger of genocide in that country.

In 2011, Schabas attended a conference in Iran with the Tehran-based Non-Aligned Movement Center for Human Rights and Cultural Diversity where he was a keynote speaker. It was reported that the center has close ties with former Iranian president President Mahmoud Ahmadinejad. He attended the conference together with US film producer Sandra Schulberg in order to present a documentary film about the Nuremberg Trial to Iranians, which was welcomed by the audience, and spoke to them about the Holocaust and Nazi atrocities. Schabas states that he went as an academic, and is opposed to academic boycotts of Israel and Iran.

In December 2019, the Republic of The Gambia filed charges of genocide against Myanmar. Led by justice minister Abubacarr Tambadou and with the support of the Organisation of Islamic Cooperation, the former international criminal lawyer alleged that a genocide against the Rohingya people took place in Myanmar between 2016 and 2017. William Schabas, who in 2010 had collaborated on a report detailing systematic attacks against the Rohingya and concluding that they met the international threshold of crimes against humanity, stood in defense of the Asian nation, leading to criticism.

== Legal and political positions ==
=== Overview ===
An interview with Schabas in the journal Intellectum offers a concise overview of his opinions on Israeli operations in Gaza, the Goldstone Report, racism in Europe, the death penalty, genocide, the Truth and Reconciliation Commission in Sierra Leone, the International Criminal Court and its arrest warrant for President Omar Hassan Ahmad al-Bashir of Sudan, and international criminal law in general.

=== Death penalty ===
Schabas has been very active in the movement for worldwide abolition of capital punishment. His book The Abolition of the Death Penalty in International Law and his other writings on the subject have been referred to in judgments by national and international tribunals, including the Judicial Committee of the Privy Council, the United States Supreme Court, the Supreme Court of Canada and the Supreme Court of the Philippines. Schabas regularly lectures on capital punishment in China and the United States. In 2009 he was a consultant to the United Nations responsible for preparing the Secretary General's five-yearly report on the status of capital punishment. Schabas is the Chair of the Scientific Advisory Board of the International Academic Network Against the Death Penalty and for a Universal Moratorium on Capital Punishment, and Advisor to the International Centre for Death Penalty Research at Beijing Normal University.

=== Genocide ===
For Schabas, the definition of what constituted the crime of genocide historically, unlike other laws governing international crimes, did not change for nearly 5 decades after its original formulation, though scholars beyond the legal discipline were critical of narrowness of the definition. Reviewing the evolving legal debate, Schabas notes a tendency to merge the notion of genocide with the related concept of crimes against humanity. In his own view, these should be kept distinct, with the former restricted to the definition originally framed in the Geneva Conventions, while the latter is sufficiently broad to prosecute all other cases of mass murder in ethnic and religious conflicts.

Schabas argues that the legal term "genocide" is a loaded one that should not be used to describe every atrocity involving mass killings. He argues that, in the strict legal sense, the only true "genocides" in recent history were the Armenian genocide, the Jewish and Gypsy Holocaust, and the Rwandan genocide. In his book Genocide in International Law: The Crime of Crimes (Cambridge University Press, 2nd ed., 2009) he supports the view that Stalin's atrocities in Ukraine, the killings of Slav and Soviet citizens under the Nazi occupation, and the Holodomor were not, legally, genocide. In his book he summarizes the legal opinions regarding the status of the atrocities committed in Bosnia, deeming them ethnic cleansing and not genocide, stating that "Ethnic cleansing is also a warning sign of genocide to come. Genocide is the last resort of the frustrated ethnic cleanser." Schabas also criticises the United Nations General Assembly for recognising ethnic cleansing as genocide.

In March 1993, Schabas co-authored the Report of the Commission of Inquiry into Human Rights Violations in Rwanda.

In a later book, War Crimes and Human Rights (Cambridge University Press, 2008), Schabas states that the killings by the Khmer Rouge in Cambodia during the late 1970s lacked "the ethnic dimension that is part of the essence of the crime [of genocide]." Schabas took the same position in 2001 in his article "Cambodia: Was it Really Genocide?" Further, while he strongly condemns the atrocities in Darfur in War Crimes and Human Rights, Schabas says that they should not be labelled genocide because "the summary execution" of non-Arabs in Darfur "does not establish genocidal intent." In War Crimes and Human Rights he also criticises the International Criminal Tribunal for the Former Yugoslavia for finding a joint criminal enterprise to commit genocide in Srebrenica.

From 10 to 12 December 2019, Schabas acted for the Myanmar government who were accused of committing genocide against the Rohingya Muslim minority at the International Court of Justice (ICJ) hearing in The Hague. His appearance drew criticism from individuals and organizations involved in human rights protection. Phil Robertson, Deputy Asia Director at Human Rights Watch, stated: "William Schabas is basically selling out the Rohingya for some Myanmar gov’t $$$. Really the worst sort of behavior, how totally immoral and two-faced". Stephen J Rapp, a former United States war crimes ambassador who works at the Holocaust museum, who contended saying it as, "We have heard this morning from my friend Bill Schabas, I was just with him 10 days ago. I prosecuted genocide, we obtained convictions for this crime. He is wrong about the law: this was a genocide." Schabas stated: "Both sides have a right to have competent representation. If people don’t understand that, that’s not my problem." In 2025, Schabas said a genocide was absolutely happening in Gaza.

=== Middle East conflict ===
==== Statements ====
In 2011, the same year Schabas attended the Center for Human Rights and Cultural Diversity conference in Iran in Tehran, he said in a speech that he believes Israeli prime minister Benyamin Netanyahu should be "in the dock of an international court." He also wrote in a law journal article that the Israeli prime minister could be regarded as "the single individual most likely to threaten the survival of Israel."

In 2012, in regard to the Iranian nuclear program, Schabas wrote that Iran "very arguably has a claim to require nuclear weapons for defensive purposes". Regarding Hamas, Schabas said "If we look at the poor people of Gaza ... all they want is a state – and they get punished for insisting upon this, and for supporting a political party in their own determination and their own assessment that seems to be representing that aspiration."

During his speech at the Russell Tribunal in 2013, Schabas said that it is his "profound belief, the international law can be used to demonstrate and underscore the violations committed by the state of Israel, and moreover can be used to hold accountable individuals who have perpetrated international crimes against the people of Palestine." Asked about various possible tools for prosecuting Israel, Schabas said: "I would have been inclined to talk about crimes against humanity, war crimes, and the crime of aggression, all of which I think can be shown have been perpetrated at various times during the history of the state of Israel. These are all crimes that have become increasingly robust in their definition in recent decades and for which we now have international institutions capable of prosecuting the crimes ... With a bit of luck and by twisting things and maneuvering we can get them before the courts"

Schabas has accused Israel of war crimes, crimes against humanity, and aggression committed "on the territory of Palestine since 2002", while acknowledging that "much of [his] effort" is focused on bringing about the prosecution of Israelis at the ICC.

==== 2014 UN Gaza inquiry ====
The United Nations Human Rights Council adopted a resolution on 23 July 2014 calling on establishment of a commission of inquiry to investigate all alleged violations of international humanitarian laws carried out by Israel during the 2014 Israel–Gaza conflict. Schabas was appointed the head of a three-member commission, together with Amal Clooney (Lebanon) who declined the nomination, and Doudou Diène (Senegal). US judge McGowan Davis joined the committee as 3rd member.

Schabas's appointment was criticized by Canada's Foreign Minister, John Baird, and the Geneva-based advocacy NGO UN Watch. They noted that Schabas, remarking on what he sees as the political bias in the choice of cases to prosecute made by the International Criminal Court, had asked: "Why are we going after the President of Sudan for Darfur and not the President of Israel for Gaza?" Schabas dismissed Baird's accusation as absurd, noting that he, Schabas, was on the editorial board of the Israel Law Review. In reply to UN Watch's demand he recuse himself on the grounds that he had once criticized Benjamin Netanyahu, Schabas countered:'"Like everybody inside and outside Israel, I disagree with people. Is everyone in Israel who has an opinion about (Benjamin) Netanyahu anti-Israel?".'

Schabas said at the time that there was some merit in comments by critics that Israel was being singled out by the UN for human rights violations, but added that double standards and bias in the UN works both ways, at times to Israel's advantage, citing the fact that the United States almost invariably vetoes resolutions critical of Israel in the Security Council. In short, he concluded:

Let's just say that it's a plausible complaint that maybe Israel has gotten a lot of attention at the Human Rights Council but at the same time it has perhaps had a lot of inattention at the Security Council, so the double standards work in both directions for Israel.

The Israeli government condemned the appointment of Schabas, and Israel's Ambassador to the UN, Ron Prosor, said in an interview "Forming an investigatory committee headed by Schabas is like inviting ISIS to organize religious tolerance week at the UN." Schabas replied that he does not hate Israel and that he will put his prior positions aside, adding: "Even if Spiderman was heading the probe, they [Israel] would've attacked him."

In February 2015 Schabas resigned after an Israeli complaint that he had billed the Palestine Liberation Organization for $US1,300 in 2012 for legal advice he gave them at their request, a precedent which might constitute evidence of a conflict of interest with his position as head of the investigative committee. He stated that he did not want the controversy to overshadow the work of the Gaza inquiry. Prime Minister Benjamin Netanyahu called on the UNHRC to shelve its report: "After the resignation of the committee chairman, who was biased against Israel, the report must not be published". Avigdor Liberman attributed Schabas's resignation to Israel's diplomatic work, stating that: "appointing Schabas to investigate Israel was like appointing Cain to investigate Abel." In reply, Schabas said the Prime Minister was entitled to spin the matter any way he liked, and that both he and Avigdor Liberman were "masters of extravagant and ridiculous statements." According to Israeli commentator Gideon Levy, Schabas had fallen victim to investigative character assassination.

In an interview with the BBC Schabas admitted that "there is a distortion in the amount of attention given against Israel, and the number of resolutions directed against Israel" but defended the claim by saying Israel gets a "soft ride in the Security Council hearings."

== Publications ==
Schabas has written or edited twenty-one books dealing in whole or in part with international human rights law, including:

- Essays on the Rome Statute of the International Criminal Court Volume I. Diritto (n. 1). il Sirente, Fagnano Alto. 1999. p. 544. ISBN 978-88-87847-00-0.
- The Abolition of the Death Penalty in International Law (Cambridge University Press, 3d ed., 2003)
- Essays on the Rome Statute of the International Criminal Court Volume II. Diritto (n. 3). il Sirente, Fagnano Alto. 2004. p. 368. ISBN 978-88-87847-02-4.
- The U.N. International Criminal Tribunals: The Former Yugoslavia, Rwanda and Sierra Leone (Cambridge University Press, 2006)
- An Introduction to the International Criminal Court (Cambridge University Press, 6th ed. 2020)
- War Crimes and Human Rights: Essays on the Death Penalty, Justice and Accountability (Cambridge University Press, 2008)
- Genocide in International Law: The Crime of Crimes (Cambridge University Press, 2d ed., 2009)
- The International Criminal Court: A Commentary on the Rome Statute (Oxford University Press, 2010)
- The Universal Declaration of Human Rights: the travaux préparatoires (Cambridge University Press, 2013) (three volumes)
- International Human Rights Law and the Canadian Charter (Carswell, 2nd ed. 1996)
- International Human Rights Law and Canadian Law: Legal Commitment, Implementation and the Charter (Carswell, 3rd ed. 2007).
- Unimaginable Atrocities: Justice, Politics and Rights at the War Crimes Tribunals (Oxford University Press, 2012)

He has also published more than three hundred articles in academic journals, primarily in the fields of international human rights law and international criminal law.
