= Richard Schabas =

Canadian physician

- Born: December 1951 (age 74)
- Occupation: Former public health physician

Richard Schabas (born December 1951) is a retired public health physician who served as the Chief Medical Officer of Health in Ontario from 1987 to 1997. Schabas also served as the Head of Preventive Oncology at Cancer Care Ontario from 1997 to 2001 and served as chief of staff at York Central Hospital from 2002 to 2005 during the 2002-2004 SARS outbreak. In 2005, he became the public health officer of Hastings, Ontario and Prince Edward, Ontario and remained in this position until his retirement in 2016. In 2021, Schabas criticized the Ontario government's response to the COVID-19 pandemic.

Schabas contributed to many provincial public health initiatives, including the Ontario Tobacco Strategy, expansion of immunization programs, introduction of breast cancer and colon cancer screening programs, and controlling the SARS outbreak.

== Career ==
In the 1970s, Schabas earned his medical license and entered public health training.

=== Chief Medical Officer of Health ===
Schabas served as the Chief Medical Officer of Health for the province of Ontario from 1987 to 1997, the longest serving individual in that position before or since. During Schabas' tenure, Charles Ssenyonga, who was living in London, Ontario, was accused of negligently infecting up to 10 women with HIV across southern Ontario from the late 1980s to the early 1990s through sexual intercourse without their knowledge of his HIV positive status. Ssenyonga was charged with aggravated assault and criminal negligence, one of the first AIDS related charges in Canada, but died before the completion of his trial.

As a result of this case, the Public Health Unit of London requested Schabas' assistance in the use of public health measures to respond to persons who are "unwilling or unable" to use appropriate precautions to reduce the risk of HIV transmission. Supported by the Canadian Bar Association, Schabas proposed reclassifying HIV/AIDS as a virulent disease under the Health Protection and Promotion Act, which already included twelve other diseases, including other sexually transmitted infections such as syphilis, gonorrhea and hepatitis B. This reclassification would allow, in specific circumstances, a medical officer of health to apply for a court order to detain a person in a hospital who had been suspected of deliberately spreading HIV. Upon decision of a Judge of the Ontario Court of Justice, the individual would undergo assessment and counselling to determine if they posed a further risk of spreading the virus. The proposal was then provided for consideration to then-Ontario Minister of Health Elinor Caplan.

Schabas believed extreme situations involving people who are "unwilling or unable" to take appropriate precautions to reduce or prevent transmission should be dealt with through the public health system, instead of the criminal justice system, a general sentiment shared by many public health bodies, legal organizations and AIDS advisory committees at that time. In this regard, Schabas noted:

there is a danger that (AIDS) will become "criminalized." It has already happened in Canada that individuals with HIV infection who have transmitted the disease have become incarcerated. It is more appropriate to detain such individuals in a health-care setting than in prison.

An editorial from the Toronto Star published on February 9, 1990, implied that if the proposal were to be developed further into legislation and enacted into law, it would end up being used much more broadly than its original intent, with the potential to quarantine any HIV positive individual or individuals with HIV engaging in consensual sex. Schabas corrected this characterization in a letter to the editor on February 14, 1990, in which he states

The designation would not in any way apply to any person with AIDS or HIV infection who engages in sex with an informed and consenting partner. This is a matter of personal choice and at no time did I intended to suggest otherwise.

However, the editorial prompted opposition of the proposal from various AIDS organizations in Ontario and led to a demonstration organized by AIDS Action Now! calling for Schabas to be fired from his position. Ultimately, the proposal was not acted upon by the Ministry of Health in Ontario and was not put into law. As a result, criminal prosecution continues to be the primary response for HIV non-disclosure in Ontario.

Richard Schabas continued to serve as the Chief Medical Officer of Health in Ontario for another seven years, after which he resigned from the position. Schabas indicated his resignation was largely out of frustration with the Conservative Government of Mike Harris and their cuts to regional public health boards in Ontario, which Schabas believed to be detrimental to the health of Ontarians. This included reductions in testing and reporting of contamination in municipal water supplies to local medical officers of health, which Schabas indicated would likely have prevented the deaths of 7 people during the Walkerton E. coli outbreak.

=== Post-Chief Medical Officer of Health and retirement ===
In August 2006, Schabas argued that the threat of H5N1 avian flu becoming a pandemic was being overexaggerated by both experts and the media. Additionally, Schabas argued that "The real lesson of SARS is that it disappeared like the morning dew, not because of draconian measures like quarantine" and that SARS "is a zoonotic disease, which is not very infective between humans, and is easy to control."

In January 2015, Schabas argued that Ontario needed to change its approach on how to handle Influenza, recommending the province focus on immunizing high risk patients, better surveillance of the flu to better prepare for flu seasons, and being more transparent on the efficacy of the Influenza vaccine. He also suggested that the flu vaccine is not as effective as it was once thought to be.

On October 5, 2016, in a meeting at the Board of Health, Medical Officer of Health (MOH), Schabas announced that he would retire in December 2016, including him retiring from clinically practising Internal Medicine at Campbellford Memorial Hospital. He decided to retire due to being healthy, having the finances to retire, wanting to spend more time with his grandchildren, and due to him feeling that public health had lost "some of the sense of purpose and direction" Schabas felt it once had. Schabas also claimed that public health was "losing its independence from the political system."

=== Post-retirement ===
In a March 2020 article in The Globe and Mail, Schabas opined that based on the number of cases and deaths, COVID-19 "does not register as a dire global crisis".

In a May 2020 interview with TVOntario, Schabas argued that schools should be open during the COVID-19 pandemic, saying that "the opening of the schools or keeping the schools open shouldn’t be a negotiable thing. It is absolutely fundamental, and that’s a starting point."

In January 2021, Schabas criticized Ontario's response to the COVID-19 pandemic, particularly the COVID-19 lockdowns the province has put in place. He called Ontario's lockdown response to COVID-19 "misguided", claiming that "Lockdown was never part of our planned pandemic response nor is it supported by strong science". Schabas also voiced his support for Ontario Member of Provincial Parliament Roman Baber, who sent a letter to Premier of Ontario Doug Ford calling for the end of COVID-19 lockdowns.

In June 2022, Schabas participated as a speaker in a retrospective seminar titled A Citizens' Hearing in Toronto, Ontario, evaluating the public health and government response to the COVID-19 pandemic in Canada.

== Personal life ==
As of 2016, Schabas lives in Warkworth, Ontario.
