= Paul Schabas =

Canadian judge

The Honourable Paul Schabas

Justice of the Ontario Superior Court
- In office 2019–Present

66th Treasurer of the Law Society
- In office 2016–2018
- Preceded by: Janet E. Minor
- Succeeded by: Malcolm M. Mercer

Paul B. Schabas is a Canadian jurist who has been serving as a judge of the Ontario Superior Court of Justice since 2019. He previously held the position of Treasurer of the Law Society of Ontario, the top elected position of the self-regulatory body for Ontario's legal profession.

== Education ==
Schabas completed his undergraduate studies in music at Indiana University Bloomington, and in history at University of Toronto's University College. He received his law degree from the University of Toronto Faculty of Law in 1984, where he won the prize of First Oralist at the annual University of Toronto / Osgoode Hall (York University) First Year Criminal Law Moots in 1982.

Schabas was called to the Bar of Ontario in 1986.

== Legal Career ==
Schabas began his legal career in 1984 as an articling student under Morris Manning QC, the prominent Toronto lawyer who represented Dr. Henry Morgentaler in R v Morgentaler, the landmark Supreme Court case that decriminalized abortion in Canada in 1988. Schabas was Manning's student in the trial of that case, in which a jury refused to convict Morgentaler and two other physicians for operating an abortion clinic in downtown Toronto in violation of Canada's Criminal Code. Following his call to the bar, Schabas was co-counsel to Manning when the case was appealed to the Supreme Court, which ultimately struck down Canada's abortion law under the Canadian Charter of Rights and Freedoms in 1988.

Prior to his appointment as a judge, Schabas was a partner at Blake, Cassels & Graydon LLP in Toronto. Schabas joined Blakes in 1988 as a litigation associate, expanding his practice to municipal, environmental, estates, tax, human rights, and media law, while continuing to practise in the areas of criminal and constitutional law. Schabas became a partner at Blakes in 1992. He is a Fellow of the American College of Trial Lawyers and the International Academy of Trial Lawyers. Schabas has appeared in the Supreme Court on 21 occasions. In a 2014 federal tax court case that garnered controversy, Schabas and his co-counsel were accused by the trial judge of making untruthful allegations against him in their appeal factum.

Schabas served as an adjunct professor at the University of Toronto Faculty of Law, where he taught media law with law partner Bert Bruser who was counsel to the Toronto Star. Schabas also served as vice-chair of the university tribunal adjudicating academic offences. He previously taught trial practice at York University's Osgoode Hall Law School and an introductory course on law to undergraduates at Trinity College, University of Toronto. He has spoken at numerous professional and academic conferences in Canada, the United States, and abroad, and published articles ranging from scholarly peer-reviewed work to op-eds in major daily newspapers. His articles have been cited by the Supreme Court of Canada on several occasions.

Schabas served as a Trustee and Chair of the Law Foundation of Ontario. He also served as Chair of Pro Bono Law Ontario, of which he was a founding director. He served as president of the Canadian Media Lawyers Association, and at various times as a director of the Canadian Civil Liberties Association, the Osgoode Society for Canadian Legal History, the Canadian Journalism Foundation, Lawyers Rights Watch Canada, the Advocates' Society, Family Service Toronto, and the National Youth Orchestra of Canada.

== Law Society of Ontario ==
Schabas was elected a bencher (a member of the governance body) of the Law Society of Upper Canada in 2007, and re-elected in 2011 and 2015. As a bencher, he served as chair of the Professional Regulation Committee, the Proceedings Authorization Committee, the Human Rights Monitoring Group, and the Access to Justice Committee. He was a member of the Equity and Indigenous Affairs, Tribunals and Finance Committees, and the Articling and Mentoring Task Forces. He also chaired hearing panels in disciplinary and licensing matters of the Law Society.

In 2016, Schabas was elected by fellow benchers as the Law Society's 66th Treasurer, a position he held until 2018. He was the second lawyer from Blakes to serve as treasurer, following in the footsteps of the firm's founder Edward Blake, who served as Treasurer in the late 1800s following his service as Canada's justice minister and as Ontario's second Premier.

During Schabas's term of office, the regulatory body was renamed the Law Society of Ontario. He oversaw the body's adoption of a new requirement in 2017 for all Ontario lawyers to expressly affirm a Statement of Principles on Equality, Diversity and Inclusion. The requirement generated significant debate in the legal profession, with many lawyers (including those who supported the principles) objecting to the mandatory nature of the requirement. This controversy became the focus of a highly polarized bencher election in 2019.

== Superior Court of Justice ==
In April 2019, Schabas was appointed a Judge of the Ontario Superior Court of Justice.

In 2023, Schabas upheld an order of the College of Psychologists of Ontario, a regulatory body, requiring Canadian psychologist and media personality Jordan Peterson to take social media training in the wake of complaints about online posts and statements over his views on women, masculinity, and gender identity.

In 2025, Schabas gained significant prominence beyond the legal community when his rulings in Cycle Toronto et al v Attorney General of Ontario, 2025 ONSC 2424, a Charter challenge against the Ontario government's push to remove existing bike lanes in downtown Toronto, were repeatedly criticized by Ontario Premier Doug Ford. After Schabas ordered the Ontario government to pause its plans while the trial was ongoing, Ford criticized “unelected” judges, earning the Premier a rare formal rebuke from all three chief justices of Ontario courts – Michael Tulloch (Chief Justice of Ontario and of the Court of Appeal), Geoffrey Morawetz (of the Superior Court of Justice), and Sharon Nicklas (of the Ontario Court of Justice) – who issued a joint statement reaffirming the need for judicial independence to uphold the rule of law.

In his trial judgment, Schabas concluded that the government's move was an unjustified violation of cyclists' Charter right to life, liberty, and security of the person. This caused further criticism by Ford, who called the judgement "the most ridiculous" he had ever seen and criticized Schabas as having been "attacked by every single person right across the country for this ridiculous decision". The Ontario government appealed Schabas' ruling in August 2025.

On August 14, 2026, the Ontario Court of Appeals found for the Ontario government, allowing the appeal in Cycle Toronto et al v Attorney General of Ontario. In the decision, written by Justice Grant Huscroft and agreed to by Associate Chief Justice of Ontario J. Michal Fairburn and Justice Benjamin Zarnett, the Court found Schabas had "erred in law in interpreting and applying s. 7. But his decision is wrong in a more profound sense, for it subverts a fundamental principle of our democratic constitutional order: a legislature cannot bind its successors." The decision goes on to state:

"With respect, the application judge lost sight of this principle [that "Policy is for politics"] when, in the course of outlining the background to the application, he weighed in on policy and political considerations. He commented extensively on the political background to the legislation, recounting remarks by the Premier and Minister of Transportation, contested data concerning road use, and exchanges at legislative committee proceedings. He quoted at length from members of the public and organizations opposed to passage of the legislation, as well as the Mayor of Toronto and the City Manager – all of this prior to addressing the only matter with which the court was properly concerned: whether the legislation violated the Charter. Indeed, the application judge’s decision is replete with criticism not only of the legislation but also of the government’s conduct in promoting its passage. He went so far as to express concern that the legislation was passed despite the government’s internal policy advice and public criticism of the bill. None of this was relevant to the task before him."

Following the ruling, Cycle Toronto executive director Michael Longfield did not rule out a further appeal of the decision to the Supreme Court of Canada in an interview with the Toronto Star.
