= Michael Schabas =

UK-based railway consultant (born 1956)

- Born: 17 November 1956; Toronto, Ontario, Canada
- Education: University of Toronto; Harvard Kennedy School
- Occupation: Railway consultant
- Known for: Founding GB Railways, Hull Trains and GB Railfreight
- Website: www.schabas.net

Michael Schabas is a Canadian-born, UK-based railway consultant who has been involved in launching several railway projects and businesses. He has advised clients on projects in more than 20 other countries.

== Early life and education ==
Schabas was born and raised in Toronto. He studied Architecture at the University of Toronto and City and Regional Planning at the Harvard Kennedy School.

== Career ==
When Schabas was Chairman of the City of Toronto Cycling Committee at the University of Toronto, he secured funding for the City’s first on-street cycle lanes. He attracted controversy by asserting cyclists had the same rights to use streets as cars.

Schabas was employed by UTDC as Design Coordinator for the first SkyTrain (Vancouver) line (now called the Expo Line), which was the world’s second driverless metro opened in 1985. He then worked in Toronto and Honolulu before moving to London as vice president of transportation for Olympia & York (O&Y), which were developing the Canary Wharf project in London Docklands. He led O&Y's involvement in planning and promotion of the Jubilee Line Extension and also instigated the re-signaling and re-engineering of the Docklands Light Railway.

In 1994, Schabas was retained by the London Borough of Newham to review the proposed Channel Tunnel Rail Link. He subsequently testified in the House of Lords for the Kings Cross Residents Association and argued against the plans to demolish their neighborhood for a new rail terminus. He suggested instead that the line could run into St Pancras which, at the time, was partly disused. Schabas was subsequently retained by British Rail, and plans were changed to use St Pancras. This, as well as the development of the Jubilee Line Extension, Docklands Light Railway, and London Overground, is covered in Schabas’s book, The Railway Metropolis – How Planners, Politicians and Developers Shaped Modern London, published 2016 by ICE Publishing.

In 1995, Schabas founded GB Railways (GBR), which went on to win the Anglia Railways franchise and to launch GB Railfreight and Hull Trains. GB Railways was part of the Great Southern Railway consortium (now Journeys Beyond Rail Expeditions), which acquired the long-distance trains operated by Australian National Railways. The Indian Pacific and Ghan services of the Australian National Railways, GB Railfreight, and Hull Trains continue to operate without subsidy.

In 2003, GBR was acquired by FirstGroup.

Schabas remained to lead FirstGroup’s acquisition of A. Merl GmbH and expanded into the German bus market.

In 2008, Schabas joined the boutique railway consultancy First Class Partnerships (FCP) based in the UK as a senior partner. FCP merged with CPCS Transcom, a global infrastructure advisory firm based in Ottawa, Canada, in 2021.

In 2013, Schabas authored a review of “The Big Move”, Toronto’s regional transport plan for Neptis, a Canadian charitable foundation. This generated renewed interest in electrification of the GO Transit regional rail system. Schabas and his firm FCP were subsequently retained by Metrolinx, the regional transit agency, to prepare an initial business case that led to the provincial government funding the project, now known as GO Expansion, with a total capital cost of about $20 billion.

In 2014, Schabas was retained to prepare a pre-feasibility study for a high-speed rail line between Toronto, Kitchener and London, Ontario. The study suggested the project could have a benefit-cost ratio of 3:1.

In December 2018, Metrolinx, a public transit agency of the Government of Ontario, hired Schabas to lead a team to create a plan for the Ontario Line, a light metro proposed for the City of Toronto.
