= Communist Party of Canada candidates in the 1988 Canadian federal election =

The Communist Party of Canada fielded several candidates in the 1988 federal election, none of whom were elected. Information about these candidates may be found on this page.

== Quebec ==
=== Papineau—Saint-Michel: Line Chabot ===
Line Chabot was a Communist Party candidate in two federal elections and one provincial election. She described herself as a bookseller in 1984.

Electoral record
| Election | Division | Party | Votes | % | Place | Winner |
|---|---|---|---|---|---|---|
| 1984 federal | Saint-Michel—Ahuntsic | Communist | 190 | 0.47 | 5/7 | Thérèse Killens, Liberal |
| 1985 provincial | Dorion | Communist | 76 | 0.31 | 7/11 | Violette Trépanier, Liberal |
| 1988 federal | Papineau—Saint-Michel | Communist | 235 | 0.60 | 6/9 | André Ouellet, Liberal |

== Ontario ==
=== Geoffrey Da Silva (Eglinton—Lawrence) ===
Da Silva received 208 votes (0.52%), finishing fifth against Liberal candidate Joe Volpe. He later became a cabinet minister in Guyana.

=== Mike Phillips (Sudbury) ===
Mike Phillips was a perennial candidate for the Communist Party at the federal and provincial levels. He was a 24-year-old electrician during his first campaign, and later worked as a labour reporter for the Canadian Tribune.

Electoral record
| Election | Division | Party | Votes | % | Place | Winner |
|---|---|---|---|---|---|---|
| 1974 federal | Davenport | Communist | 123 | | 4/6 | Charles Caccia, Liberal |
| 1975 provincial | York South | Communist | 609 | | 4/4 | Donald C. MacDonald, New Democratic Party |
| 1977 provincial | York South | Communist | 526 | | 4/5 | Donald C. MacDonald, New Democratic Party |
| 1980 federal | York South—Weston | Communist | 99 | | 5/6 | Ursula Appolloni, Liberal |
| 1981 provincial | York South | Communist | 472 | | 4/4 | Donald C. MacDonald, New Democratic Party |
| 1984 federal | York South—Weston | Communist | 174 | | 6/6 | John Nunziata, Liberal |
| 1988 federal | Sudbury | Communist | 102 | 0.24 | 5/5 | Diane Marleau, Liberal |

=== John (Jack) C. Sweet (York West) ===
Sweet was a toolmaker, administrator and IBM clerk in private life, and was a perennial candidate for federal, provincial and municipal office in North York. He joined the Communist Party at age eighteen and was a member for more than fifty years, working for a time in the organization's Toronto headquarters.

Sweet contributed to "Canadian Aid for Russia" in 1943, during World War II. He was president of Toronto's Tim Buck-Norman Bethune Education Centre during the 1980s. A dedicated community activist, he was also president of the Humberlea Community Association and chairman of a Metro tax reform council. He opposed an expansion of Pearson International Airport in 1989.

He was listed as sixty-six years old during the 1984 campaign.

The closest he ever came to winning election was in 1978, when he was narrowly defeated for a North York school trustee position.

Electoral record
| Election | Division | Party | Votes | % | Place | Winner |
|---|---|---|---|---|---|---|
| 1962 North York municipal | Council, Ward Seven | n/a | 450 | | 4/4 | John Dean Booth |
| 1964 North York municipal | Council, Ward One | n/a | 650 | | 2/2 | John Dean Booth |
| 1966 North York municipal | Council, Ward One | n/a | 210 | | 3/3 | John Dean Booth |
| 1969 North York municipal | Council, Ward One | n/a | 405 | | 6/7 | Fred Schindeler |
| 1971 provincial | Yorkview | Communist | 391 | | 4/4 | Fred Young, New Democratic Party |
| 1972 North York municipal | Council, Ward One | n/a | 180 | | 6/6 | Gord Risk |
| 1974 North York municipal | Council, Ward One | n/a | 143 | | 6/6 | Gord Risk |
| 1975 provincial | Yorkview | Communist | 594 | | 4/4 | Fred Young, New Democratic Party |
| 1976 North York municipal | Council, Ward One | n/a | 385 | | 4/4 | Gord Risk |
| 1978 North York municipal | School Trustee, Ward One | n/a | 1,365 | | 2/2 | Jo Treasure |
| 1980 North York municipal | School Trustee, Ward One | n/a | 421 | | 4/5 | Sheila Lambrinos |
| 1981 provincial | Yorkview | Communist | 503 | | 5/7 | Michael Spensieri, Liberal |
| 1982 North York municipal | School Trustee, Ward One | n/a | 717 | | 3/4 | Sheila Lambrinos |
| 1984 federal | York West | Communist | 147 | | 7/7 | Sergio Marchi, Liberal |
| 12 November 1984 North York municipal by-election | Council, Ward One | n/a | not listed | | not listed | Mario Sergio |
| 1988 federal | York West | Communist | 119 | | 7/7 | Sergio Marchi, Liberal |
