= 1961 Ontario New Democratic Party leadership election =

1961 leadership convention of the Ontario New Democratic Party

- Date: 8 October 1961
- Convention: Sheraton-Brock Hotel, Niagara Falls, Ontario
- Resigning leader: Position created
- Won by: Donald C. MacDonald
- Ballots: 0
- Candidates: 1

The 1961 Ontario New Democratic Party leadership election was held on 8 October 1961 at the Sheraton-Brock Hotel in Niagara Falls to choose the first leader of the Ontario New Democratic Party. Donald C. MacDonald, who had led the Ontario CCF since 1953, was acclaimed as leader of the newly formed party.

The convention was part of the founding of the Ontario New Democratic Party, which brought together the Ontario CCF, affiliated trade unions, and New Party clubs. The new provincial party was created shortly after the national New Democratic Party was founded in Ottawa in August 1961.

== Background ==
The Co-operative Commonwealth Federation had been the main social democratic party in Ontario since the 1930s. The Ontario CCF reached its high point in the 1943 Ontario general election, when it became the province's Official Opposition, but it declined sharply in the postwar years. By the early 1950s, the party had been reduced to a small legislative caucus.

Donald C. MacDonald became leader of the Ontario CCF in 1953 and gradually rebuilt the party. He won a seat in the Legislative Assembly of Ontario for York South in the 1955 Ontario general election and led the party through the 1959 Ontario general election, when the CCF won five seats.

During the late 1950s and early 1960s, the CCF and the labour movement worked to create a new social democratic party. At the federal level, the New Democratic Party was founded in August 1961. In Ontario, delegates from the CCF, affiliated unions, and New Party clubs met at the Sheraton-Brock Hotel in Niagara Falls from 7 to 9 October 1961 to establish the Ontario New Democratic Party.

== Candidate ==
- Donald C. MacDonald – MacDonald was the leader of the Ontario CCF and MPP for York South. Born in Cranbrook, British Columbia, and raised partly in Saskatchewan, he served in the Royal Canadian Navy during the Second World War before working as a CCF organizer. He was chosen as Ontario CCF leader in 1953 and elected to the legislature in 1955. At the time of the 1961 convention, he was already the best-known figure in the provincial party and was acclaimed as the first leader of the Ontario NDP.

== Ballot results ==
Candidate	Votes	%
Donald C. MacDonald	acclaimed	n/a

== Aftermath ==
MacDonald led the Ontario NDP into the 1963 Ontario general election, the party's first provincial election under its new name. The NDP won seven seats, a modest increase over the five seats held by the CCF after the 1959 election.

The party made a larger breakthrough in the 1967 Ontario general election, when it increased its caucus to 20 seats and became a stronger force in the legislature. MacDonald faced a leadership challenge from Jim Renwick in 1968, which he defeated. He remained leader until 1970, when Stephen Lewis was elected to succeed him at the 1970 Ontario New Democratic Party leadership election.
