= Frank Esposito (candidate) =

Frank Esposito was a perennial candidate for municipal office. He campaigned for the North York Board of Control in 1980, 1982 and 1985, and later ran for office in Vaughan.

== Career ==
The 1981 Ontario general election campaign in Yorkview was his sole bid for provincial office. He called for all existing crown land to be subdivided to provide housing for low income families, and encouraged the abolition of lotteries, which he said encourage "family breakup".

Esposito's main promise in the 1980 election was to improve the functioning of city council committees. He did not actively campaign for office, and did not put up any signs. In 1982, he called for property taxes to be replaced by an income tax. he supported property tax reform in 1985, along with increased day care services and youth centres and initiatives to assist senior citizens with staying in their own homes. He was defeated all three occasions. Esposito also ran for North York City Council in a 1984 by-election, held in the city's first ward.

In 1988, Esposito campaigned for the York Regional Council as a Vaughan representative. He was listed as the fifty-year-old president of a house-building firm, and as being fluent in English, Italian and Spanish. He renewed his support for lower property taxes and increased day care options, also calling for low-density affordable housing while opposing townhouses and highrise projects. He was again defeated.

Esposito's final municipal campaign to date was in 1991, when he sought election to Vaughan Council's first ward. He was listed as a resident of Woodbridge, and a part-time real estate agent. He called for increased recycling services.

== Electoral record ==
Electoral record
Election	Division	Party	Votes	%	Place	Winner
1980 North York municipal	Board of Control	n/a	17,643		7/9	top four candidates elected
1981 provincial	Yorkview	Independent	798		4/7	Michael Spensieri, Liberal
1982 North York municipal	Board of Control	n/a	19,818		6/11	top four candidates elected
12 November 1984 North York municipal by-election	Council, Ward One	n/a	not listed		not listed	Mario Sergio
1985 North York municipal	Board of Control	n/a	21,365	6.18	6/13	top four candidates elected
1988 Vaughan municipal	Regional Council	n/a	3,820		5/5	Michael Di Biase and David Chapley
1991 Vaughan municipal	Council, Ward One	n/a	1303		2/2	Peter Meffe

- The 1980 result is taken from the Toronto Star newspaper, with 1,257 of 1,379 polls reporting.
- The 1982 result is taken from the Globe and Mail (8 November) newspaper, with 1,311 or 1,329 polls reporting.
- The 1985 result is taken from the Globe and Mail newspaper (13 November).
- The 1988 result is taken from the Toronto Star newspaper (22 November).
- The 1991 result is taken from the Globe and Mail newspaper (14 November).
