= 1968 Ontario New Democratic Party leadership election =

Leadership challenge in the Ontario New Democratic Party

- Date: 17 November 1968
- Convention: Bingeman Park, Kitchener, Ontario
- Won by: Donald C. MacDonald
- Ballots: 1

The 1968 Ontario New Democratic Party leadership challenge took place at the biennial convention of the Ontario New Democratic Party (NDP), held on 17 November 1968 at Bingeman Park in Kitchener, Ontario. Incumbent leader Donald C. MacDonald defeated a challenge from Jim Renwick and was re-elected leader of the party.

The contest was one of the most significant leadership challenges in the history of the Ontario NDP prior to the election of Stephen Lewis in 1970. Although MacDonald won comfortably, the challenge exposed growing tensions within the party concerning leadership, electoral strategy, and the future direction of democratic socialism in Ontario.

== Background ==
MacDonald had led the Ontario CCF since 1953 and became the first leader of the Ontario NDP when the provincial party was reorganized in 1961.

Under his leadership, the Ontario NDP gradually expanded its representation in the Legislative Assembly. In the 1967 Ontario general election, the party increased its caucus from eight seats to twenty and won approximately one-quarter of the provincial vote, its strongest result since the Ontario CCF's wartime breakthrough in 1943.

Despite these gains, some party members believed that MacDonald lacked the public profile necessary to lead the NDP to government. A younger generation of activists and legislators argued that the party required more dynamic leadership and a stronger public image in order to compete effectively against the governing Progressive Conservatives and the resurgent Liberals.

== Challenge ==
The challenge was launched by Jim Renwick, the newly elected Member of Provincial Parliament for Riverdale and one of the party's rising stars. Renwick argued that the Ontario NDP required more visible and energetic leadership if it hoped to become a governing party.

According to historian J. T. Morley, leadership reviews were constitutionally possible because the Ontario NDP leader was elected by convention delegates in the same manner as other party officers and was therefore subject to challenge at each convention.

Renwick formally informed MacDonald of his intention to seek the leadership, triggering an active campaign in advance of the convention. MacDonald quickly secured the support of much of the party establishment, including many constituency organizations and key labour leaders.

The challenge also exposed divisions within the legislative caucus. Several younger members privately questioned whether MacDonald could ever lead the party to power, while others argued that replacing a leader immediately after the party's strongest electoral performance in decades would be politically damaging.

== Convention ==
The leadership vote took place during the Ontario NDP's convention at Bingeman Park in Kitchener on 17 November 1968.

The campaign became increasingly contentious as convention delegates assembled. Tensions developed between supporters of Renwick and several prominent trade union leaders aligned with MacDonald.

Morley later wrote that Renwick's campaign was weakened by organizational difficulties and by confrontations with labour leaders, particularly officials associated with the United Steelworkers. The resulting disputes helped consolidate organized labour behind MacDonald's candidacy.

When delegates voted, MacDonald won re-election by a substantial margin.

== Results ==
Candidate	Votes	Percentage
Donald C. MacDonald	859	69.9
Jim Renwick	370	30.1
Total	1,229	100

== Aftermath ==
Although MacDonald's victory was decisive, the challenge demonstrated that a substantial minority of delegates wanted new leadership.

Historians have viewed the contest as an early indication of broader ideological and generational changes occurring within the Ontario NDP during the late 1960s. Many of the activists who questioned the party's direction would later participate in debates surrounding the emergence of the Waffle movement and the future orientation of Canadian democratic socialism.

The tensions revealed by the 1968 convention did not disappear after MacDonald's victory. Over the following two years, growing pressure developed within the party for a change in leadership. In 1970 MacDonald announced that he would not seek another term, opening the way for the election of Stephen Lewis as Ontario NDP leader at the 1970 Ontario New Democratic Party leadership election.

Several historians have identified the 1968 challenge as the beginning of the final phase of MacDonald's leadership and an important precursor to the ideological struggles that shaped the Ontario NDP during the early 1970s.
