= 1982 Ontario municipal elections =

All municipalities in Ontario held elections on November 8, 1982, to elect mayors or reeves, city councillors, and school trustees. Some areas also held referendums.

Art Eggleton was re-elected as mayor of Toronto, and Mel Lastman was re-elected as mayor of the Toronto-area city North York. Outside of Toronto, Dave Neumann was returned as mayor of Brantford.

== Elected mayors and reeves ==
- Ajax: Bill McLean
- Barrie: Ross Archer
- Belleville: George Zegouras
- Brampton: Ken Whillans
- Brantford: Dave Neumann (details)
- Burlington: Roly Bird
- Caledon: John Clarkson
- Cambridge: Claudette Millar
- Chatham: Margaret Archibald
- Cornwall: Gerald Parisien
- East York: Dave Johnson (details)
- Etobicoke: Dennis Flynn (details)
- Flamborough: Chris Ward
- Fort Erie: Heinz Hummel
- Gloucester: Fred Barrett (details)
- Guelph: Norm Jary
- Halton Hills: Peter Pomeroy
- Hamilton: Bob Morrow
- Kingston: John Gerretsen
- Kingston (Township): John Smale
- Kitchener: Dom Cardillo
- London: Al Gleeson
- Markham: Tony Roman
- Milton: Gordon Krantz
- Mississauga: Hazel McCallion (details)
- Nepean: Ben Franklin (details)
- Newcastle: Garnet Rickard
- Newmarket: Ray Twinney
- Niagara Falls: Wayne Thomson
- North Bay: Merle Dickerson
- North York: Mel Lastman (details)
- Oakville: Harry Barrett
- Orillia: Pat McIsaac
- Oshawa: Allan Pilkey
- Ottawa: Marion Dewar (details)
- Peterborough: Bob Barker
- Pickering: Jack Anderson
- Richmond Hill: Al Duffy
- Sarnia: Marceil Saddy
- Sault Ste. Marie: Don MacGregor
- Scarborough: Gus Harris (details)
- St. Catharines: Roy Adams
- Stoney Creek: Bill Sears
- Stratford: Ted Blowes
- St. Thomas: Doug Tarry
- Sudbury: Peter Wong
- Thunder Bay: Walter Assef
- Timmins: Vic Power
- Toronto: Art Eggleton (details)
- Valley East: Howard Armstrong
- Vaughan: Lorna Jackson
- Waterloo: Marjorie Carroll
- Welland: Eugene Stranges
- Whitby: Robert Attersley
- Windsor: Elizabeth Kishkon
- Woodstock: Wendy Calder
- York: Alan Tonks(details)

== Results ==
=== Brantford ===
1982 Brantford municipal election: Mayor of Brantford
Candidate	Votes	%
(x)Dave Neumann	16,267	75.68
Yvonne McMahon	1,638	7.62
William Stewart	1,136	5.28
Robert MacKeigan	1,014	4.72
Andy Woolley	954	4.44
Lenny Kerr	486	2.27
Total valid votes	21,495	100
