= Claudio Polsinelli =

Canadian politician

Ontario MPP
- In office 1985–1990
- Preceded by: Michael Spensieri
- Succeeded by: George Mammoliti
- Constituency: Yorkview

Personal details
- Born: November 13, 1952 (age 73) Italy
- Party: Liberal
- Occupation: Lawyer

Claudio Polsinelli (born November 13, 1952) is a former politician in Ontario, Canada. He served in the Legislative Assembly of Ontario as a Liberal from 1985 to 1990.

== Background ==
Polsinelli was educated at the University of Toronto, Osgoode Hall Law School and York University.

== Politics ==
In 1982, he ran for alderman in the municipal election for Ward 3 in North York. He defeated incumbent Pat O'Neill.

He was elected to the Ontario legislature in the 1985 provincial election, defeating New Democratic Party candidate Mike Foster by over 3,000 votes in the Yorkview constituency. He was re-elected by a greater margin in the 1987 election, despite an unusual challenge from Tony Marzilli who ran as an Independent "Trudeau Liberal". Polsinelli was a backbench supporter of David Peterson's government during his time in the legislature, and served as a parliamentary assistant to four different ministers between 1985 and 1990.

The Liberals were defeated by the NDP in the 1990 provincial election, and Polsinelli lost his seat to NDP candidate George Mammoliti by 1,619 votes.

Six weeks after his defeat, he was appointed to North York council to fill the seat vacated by Anthony Perruzza who was elected as an NDP member of the provincial government. He did not seek re-election in the 1991 municipal election. In 1995 he ran in a by-election to replace Mario Sergio another councillor who left to sit in the provincial legislature. He lost to another defeated provincial candidate George Mammoliti.

== Later life ==
In 1990, he set up an independent legal practice which he continues to do.
