= 1982 Toronto municipal election =

1982 Toronto mayoral election
- November 8, 1982
- Turnout: 42%
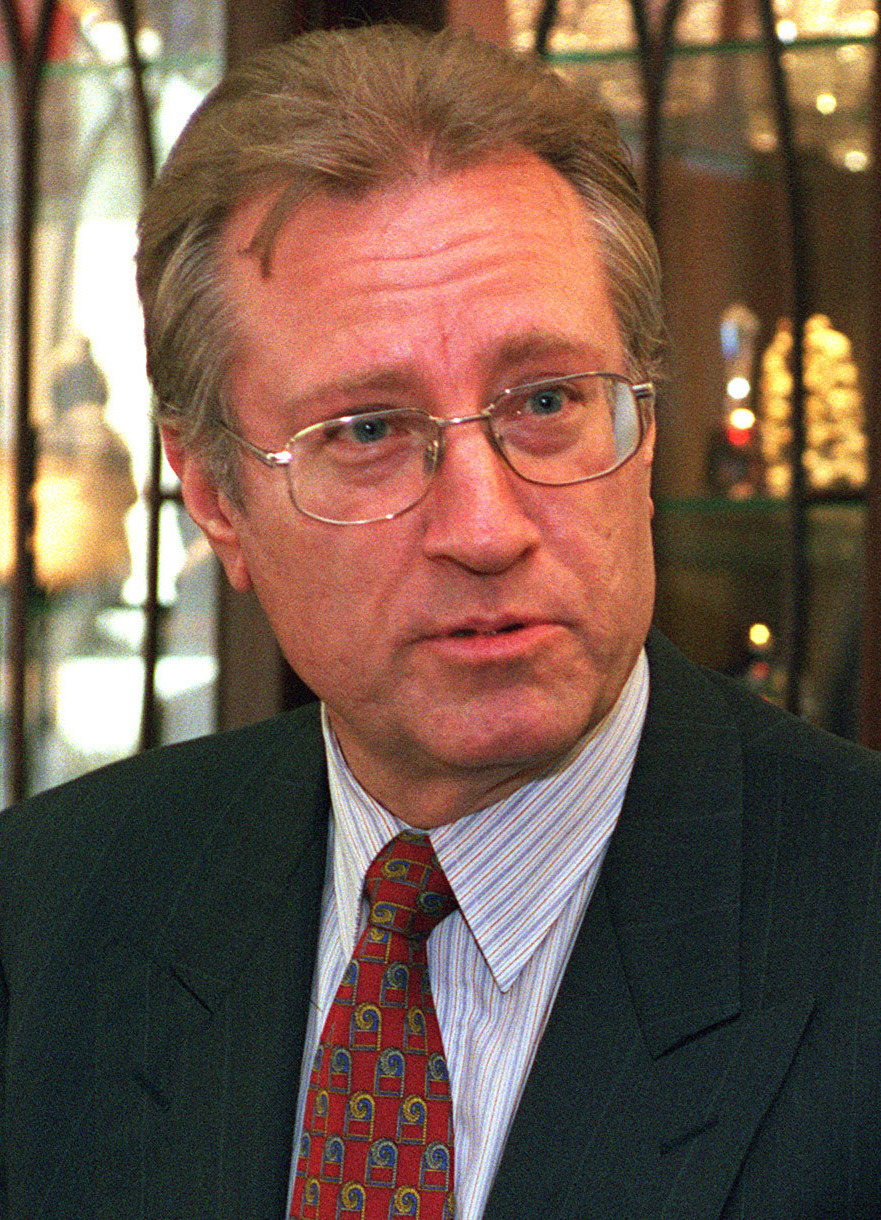
Candidate	Art Eggleton	A. Hummer
Popular vote	119,387	11,721
Percentage	74%	7%
Mayor of Toronto before election
Art Eggleton
Elected Mayor of Toronto
Art Eggleton

The 1982 Toronto municipal election was held on November 8, 1982, in Metropolitan Toronto, Ontario, Canada. Mayors, controllers, city councillors and school board trustees were elected in the municipalities of Toronto, York, East York, North York, Etobicoke and Scarborough.

Art Eggleton was re-elected as Mayor of Toronto, and Mel Lastman was re-elected as Mayor of North York.

== Toronto ==
=== Mayoral race ===
Incumbent Art Eggleton faced no real opposition in his bid for reelection and was reelected by more than a hundred thousand vote margin. A. Hummer, (performance artist Deanne Taylor of the Hummer Sisters), ran on the slogan "ART vs Art". Another figure from the Toronto music scene ran as well as Blair Martin, singer for Punk Rock band the Raving Mojos, also ran for Mayor.

Results
Art Eggleton - 119,387
A. Hummer - 11,721
Wendy Johnston - 7,937
M.M.A. Armstrong - 7,638
John Kellerman - 2,943
Fred Dunn - 2,442
Zoltan Szoboszlov - 2,171
Frenchie McFarlane - 1,865
Blair Martin - 1,858
Stan Price - 1,341
Andrejs Murniecks - 535

=== City council ===
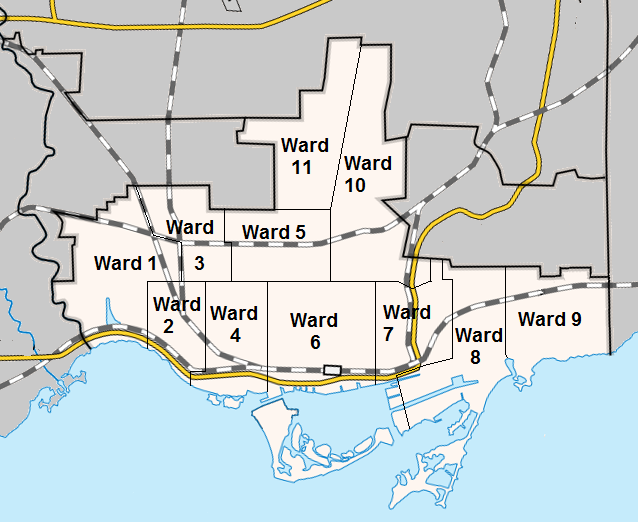
Ward boundaries used in the 1982 election

The right gained one extra seat on city council. In the west end NDP incumbent David White was defeated by Derwyn Shea and 23-year-old Tom Jakobek won a surprise victory in the Beaches to replace retiring NDPer Pat Sheppard. The biggest upset of the night was in downtown Toronto where Gordon Chong, who served on the executive at both the city and Metro, was defeated by newcomer Jack Layton.

Two aldermen were elected per Ward. The alderman with the most votes was declared Senior Alderman and sat on both Toronto City Council and Metropolitan Toronto Council.

Ward 1 (Swansea and Bloor West Village)
Derwyn Shea - 7,948
William Boytchuk (incumbent) - 7,617
David White (incumbent) - 7,298
Ed Ziemba - 6,852
John Begeja - 915

Ward 2 (Parkdale and Brockton)
Ben Grys (incumbent) - 4,907
Chris Korwin-Kuczynski (incumbent) - 4,736
Irene Atkinson - 3,835
Fred Bever - 3,746
John Frensen - 2,767
Barbara Poplawski - 2,449
Doug Janes - 2,264
Owen Leach - 949
Jimmy Talpa - 114

Ward 3 (Davenport and Corso Italia)
Richard Gilbert (incumbent) - 7,883
Joseph Piccininni (incumbent) - 6,450
Carmen Prezioso - 4,430
Nan McDonald - 1,415

Ward 4 (Trinity-Bellwoods and Little Italy)
Tony O'Donohue (incumbent) - 6,104
Joe Pantalone (incumbent) - 5,895
J. Carlos Sousa - 2,572
Gordon Massie - 883

Ward 5 (The Annex and Yorkville)
Ying Hope (incumbent) - 9,009
Ron Kanter (incumbent) - 8,558
David Scott - 3,987
Georgina Langford - 977
John Papagiannis - 622

Ward 6 (Financial District, Toronto – University of Toronto)
John Sewell (incumbent) - 13,419
Jack Layton - 9,892
Gordon Chong (incumbent) - 8,213
Oscar Wong - 2,479
Bill Beatty - 1,563
Martin Amber - 546

Ward 7 (Regent Park and Riverdale)
Joanne Campbell - 7,921
David Reville (incumbent) - 7,218
Eric Leggatt - 4,091
Kenneth Bhagan - 2,284
Bill Mole - 1,897
Thelma Forsyth - 691

Ward 8 (Riverdale)
Fred Beavis (incumbent) - 7,387
Thomas Clifford (incumbent) - 6,786
Jack de Klerk - 4,773
Tom Lenathen - 651
Geoff Da Silva - 643
Eric Armitage - 454

Ward 9 (The Beaches)
Tom Jakobek - 11,018
Dorothy Thomas (incumbent) - 7,502
John Oliver - 6,733
Peter Harris - 5,405
Winona Gallop - 789

Ward 10 (Rosedale and North Toronto)
June Rowlands (incumbent) - 15,082
Michael Walker - 10,065
Charlotte Maher - 8,164

Ward 11 (Forest Hill and North Toronto)
Anne Johnston (incumbent) - 14,376
Michael Gee (incumbent) - 13,382
Lynda Weinrib - 3,556
Mark Tigh - 2,319

Results are taken from the November 9, 1982, Toronto Star and might not exactly match final tallies.

== Changes ==
Ward 6 Alderman John Sewell resigned on February 6, 1984, to become a columnist at The Globe and Mail; the remaining Ward 6 Alderman Jack Layton was appointed a Metro Councillor. A by-election was held on April 9, 1984.

Dale Martin - 6,536
Susan Eng - 5,716
Peter Maloney - 1,135
Mario Cavuoto - 318
Martin Amber - 162
Rita Luty - 143
Joe Baptiasta - 88
Al Rahemutlla - 22
Jimmy Talpa - 9

Ward 7 Alderman David Reville resigned on April 1, 1985, to contest the 1985 Provincial Election and was not replaced.

== East York ==
Dave Johnson easily won the mayoral race to replace Alan Redway who retired to run for federal office. All the incumbent councillors were re-elected. Bob Willis in ward one and Edna Beange in ward four were the only newcomers to council.

† denotes incumbent from previous council

=== Mayor ===
- Dave Johnson – 19,365
- Herbert McGroartry – 6,308
- Edward Shaw – 1,289

=== Council ===
Two to be elected from each ward

Ward 1

- †Cy Reader – 5,040
- Bob Willis – 3,758
- Art Greenwood – 3,285
- Bill Gorelle – 1,424

Ward 2

- †Mike Wyatt – 3,620
- †Norm Crone – 3,113
- George Vasilopoulos – 2,288
- Shirley Browne – 1,718
- Paul Stergio – 456
- Adam Vassos – 386
- George Tsenis – 102

Ward 3

- †Gordon Crann – 3,962
- †Ken Paige – 2,362
- Michael Prue – 2,130
- Bob Dale – 1,533
- George Vlahos – 1,470
- Anna Siders – 639
- Jim Cull – 493
- Edward Kenny -367
- Nadio Furlani – 251

Ward 4

- †Peter Oyler – 3,947
- Edna Beange – 2,752
- Jean-Marie Jenner – 2,057
- John Feeney – 1,145
- Al Addie – 676

=== Board of education ===
One to be elected from each ward

Ward 1

- †Gord Brown – 3,419
- †Ruth Goldhar – 2,795
- Miller Alloway – 2,004
- Carol Ferguson – 1,927
- Fred Wilkes – 1,390

Ward 2

- †James Palmer – 3,224
- †Kenneth Maxted – 2,612
- Constance Cuthbertson – 2,152

Ward 3

- †Margaret Hazelton – 3,516
- †William Phillips – 3,084
- Len Self – 1,915
- Ross Wilson – 1,040

Ward 4

- Robert Murray – 2,480
- Elca Rennick – 2,303
- Grace Becker – 1,915
- Virginia Hoffman – 1,876

=== Hydro Commission ===
Two to be elected

- †Jack Christie – 16,492
- †Frank Johnson – 11,299
- Chris John – 4,528
- Donald Hedrick – 4,221

== Etobicoke ==
=== Mayor ===
- (incumbent) Dennis Flynn 50,302
- Mike Austin 6,342
- James Brown 3,344
- Terry Howes 3,340
- Don Douloff 1,125

(810 of 851 polls)

=== Etobicoke Board of Control ===
(4 elected)

- (incumbent) Bruce Sinclair 33,339
- (incumbent) Dick O'Brien 30,082
- Leonard Braithwaite 27,402
- Christopher Stockwell 27,065
- (incumbent) David Lacey 25,627
- Helen Wursta 23,799
- Al Allman 16,587
- Jim Mills 13,017

(810 of 851 polls)

=== Etobicoke City Council (Aldermen) ===
(2 elected per ward)

==== Ward 1 ====
- (X) Ruth Grier
- Alex Faulkner
- (incumbent) David Sandford
- Jay Sullivan
- Althio Dell Anno

==== Ward 2 ====
- (incumbent) Pete Farrow
- Julie Lyons
- Donald Kerr
- Beryl Innis
- James Vance

==== Ward 3 ====
- Ron Barr
- Doug Holyday
- Dorthy Hobbs
- David Harris
- Nancy Cooper
- Lorne Hemphill
- Ed Borkowski
- Geoffrey Grossmith
- Lou Voticky

==== Ward 4 ====
- (incumbent) Mary Huffman
- (incumbent) Alex Marchelli
- Bob Wigmore
- Bruce Melanson
- Joan Tredger
- Bryan Farnocchi
- Michael Lannan

==== Ward 5 ====
- (incumbent) Lois Griffin
- (incumbent) David Anderson
- Rocky Gordiano
- Edward McWilliams

== North York ==
=== Mayor ===
Mel Lastman was re-elected mayor of the city and served until 1997.

- (incumbent) Mel Lastman – 95,431
- Muriel Cassidy – 15,849
- Ian Kalushner – 4,617

(1311 out of 1329 polls)

=== North York Board of Control ===
(4 elected)

- (incumbent) Esther Shiner – 64,623
- Barbara Greene – 57,948
- (incumbent) Robert Yuill – 50,668
- (incumbent) William Sutherland – 50,134
- (incumbent) Norm Gardner – 46,898
- Frank Esposito – 19,318
- Tony D'amato – 16,629
- Bernadette Michael – 12,746
- Sonnee Cohen – 12,542
- Agostino Settecase – 5,799
- Richard Kirkup – 5,051

(1311 out of 1329 polls)

=== North York Council ===
Ward 1

- Sergio Marchi (1984 - Mario Sergio)

Ward 2

- (incumbent)Mario Gentile

Ward 3

- Claudio Polsinelli

1982 Toronto municipal election: North York Councillor, Ward Four
Candidate	Votes	%
(x)Howard Moscoe	4,000	46.44
Frank Di Giorgio	2,923	33.93
Eleanor Rosen	1,191	13.83
Sydney Moscoe	500	5.80
Total valid votes	8,614	100.00

73 out of 75 polls reporting.

- Eleanor Rosen was a member of the Progressive Conservative Party. She campaigned for North York's fourth council ward in the 1978, 1982 and 1988 elections, losing each time. There was some controversy in her 1982 campaign, when rival candidate Howard Moscoe informed reporters that the same ten people had signed the nomination forms for Rosen and Sydney Moscoe. Some suspected that Sydney Moscoe's candidacy was an attempt to confuse voters. Rosen pledged to close down a walkway connecting Lawrence Heights with the rest of the city. Rosen was president of the Lawrence Manor Ratepayers' Association in the mid-1980s, and opposed the Tridel corporation's construction plans in the area. She was listed as a forty-seven-year-old administrative assistant in the 1988 campaign, and called for extension of the Spadina Expressway.

Results taken from The Globe and Mail, 9 November 1982.
The final results confirmed Moscoe's victory.

Ward 5

- (incumbent) Mike Foster

Ward 6

- (incumbent) Milton Berger

Ward 7

- (incumbent) Irving Chapley

Ward 8

- (incumbent) Andy Borins

Ward 9

- (incumbent) Ronald Summers

Ward 10

- (incumbent) Marie Labatte

Ward 11

- Jim McGuffin

Ward 12

- (incumbent) Barry Burton

Ward 13

- (incumbent) Elinor Caplan

Ward 14

- Betty Sutherland

Sergio Marchi was elected as councillor for Ward One. He resigned in 1984, after he was elected to the House of Commons of Canada. A by-election was held to choose his replacement.

Toronto municipal by-election, November 12, 1984: North York Councillor, Ward One
Candidate	Votes	%
Mario Sergio	2,685	.
Ted Wray	1,139	.
Frank Esposito	.	.
Ralph Frascino	.	.
Nick Iamonico	.	.
Paul Leli	.	.
Cal Osmond	.	.
Anthony Perruzza	.	.
Mario Reda	.	.
Jack Sweet	.	.
Camilo Tiqui	.	.

- Ted Wray was a retired chief estimator for Ontario Hydro. He later campaigned to become a school trustee for North York's first ward in the 1985 and 1988 municipal elections, losing to Sheila Lambrinos both times. He was sixty years old in the 1988 campaign and spoke out against selling schools to balance the board's budget. In 1989, when serving as president of the Oakdale Acres Ratepayers Association, Wray opposed a school tax increase and argued that the board was not spending money productively. He later called for election signs to be banned to reduce pollution.
- Ralph Frascino was a forty-year-old employee of Toronto Hydro. He called for a new community centre in North York's first ward.
- Nick Iamonico was a first-time candidate. He later campaigned for Mayor of North York in the 1985 municipal election and finished last in a field of three candidates. His platform was centred on bolstering small business and reducing property taxes by 50%. Iamonico later campaigned for the 14th Ward on the Metro Toronto Separate School Board in 1991. He was listed as a thirty-five-year-old paralegal and stressed the need for "Christian values" in the school system. He finished third against Mary Cicogna. A 1996 report in the Ontario Law Times indicates that he was fined $10,000 for misrepresenting himself as a lawyer. Iamonico ran for mayor of Brockville in 2000, losing to Ben TeKamp.
- Paul Leli was thirty-three years old and managed a tire and rubber company.
- Cal Osmond was a second-time candidate. He had previously campaigned for North York's first council ward in the 1982 general election, losing to Sergio Marchi. A thirty-six-year-old traffic manager, he called for more industrial and residential development in the ward.
- Mario Reda was forty-four years old. He owned a furniture store and led a ratepayer's group in the area.

Results are taken from the Toronto Star, 13 November 1984, A7. The Star only included the poll results for the top two candidates; all other candidates are listed in alphabetical order. The final official result confirmed Sergio's victory.

== Scarborough ==
In Scarborough, Gus Harris retained his role as mayor. He fought off a challenge by former Board of Control member Brian Harrison. Frank Faubert regained his seat on the Board of Control which he lost in 1980. Harris would be the last Borough Mayor and first City Mayor in 1983.

The number of wards increased by 2 to 14 from 12. Most incumbents were re-elected although Ward 11 alderman Ron Watson lost to newcomer Bob Aaroe in the ward 12 race.

=== Mayor ===
(incumbent)Gus Harris 54,193
Brian Harrison 44,799
Paul Bordonaro 4,122

=== Board of Control ===
(4 elected)

(incumbent) Ken Morrish 56,318
(incumbent) Carol Ruddell 55,303
(incumbent) Joyce Trimmer 53,292
Frank Faubert 51,963
Susan Hunt 42,733
Marvyn Murray 12,052
Bob Watson 31,116

=== Borough Aldermen (City Aldermen after 1983) ===
Ward 1
Bill Belfontaine (incumbent) 3,824
Gary Majesky 2,319
Nina Willcocks 1,938
George A. Key 207

Ward 2
Barry Christensen (incumbent) 4,125
May McKenzie 1,844
Bill Widdowson 569

Ward 3
David Dinkworth (incumbent) 2,655
Dave Robertson 2,343
John Wardrope 2,044
Sydney Zaidl 740
Rita Bateman 541

Ward 4
Kurt Christensen 2,298
Patrick Mason 1,531
Carole Lidgold1,214
Bryan Butler 1,173
Jim Voden 713
John Tsopelas 562
Ruth A. Lunel 284

Ward 5
Marilyn Mushinski 3,146
Joe Turner 2,791
Bill Settatree 1,300
Gerald O'Reilly 337

Ward 6
Florence Cruikshank (incumbent) 5,538
Joe Zammit 2,082

Ward 7
Ed Fulton (incumbent) 6,178
Joe Trentadue 3,415

Ward 8
Shirley Eidt (incumbent) 6,271
Kevin Speares 1,570

Ward 9
John Mackie 3,444
Reg Tays 2,403
Brian Harling 1,848
Kurt Beitinger 852
Al Da Silva 596

Ward 10
Maureen Prinsloo (incumbent) acclaimed

Ward 11
Scott Cavalier 1,665
Vera Brookes 1,358
Ralph Rizzuto 1,235
John Yeoman 679
Dave Zaretsky 199
Rajinder Singh Panwar 104

Ward 12
Bob Aaroe 2,525
Ron Watson 2,247
Dave Pearce 1,643
Ken Wayne 227
Jef Hahn 84

Ward 13
Joe Dekort 3,055
Chicky Cheppel 918

Ward 14
Edith Montgomery 1,499
Roy Paluoja 1,049
Lolita Brown 865
Jerry Daca 572
Ray Alix 456
John Brickenden 411
Stan Samuel 311
Mike Tierney 179

== York ==
In the borough of York, Alan Tonks defeated Gayle Christie for mayor in the only Metro race that saw an upset victory. Two incumbents were defeated while two were re-elected. Wards 4, 6 and 7 were open races.

=== Mayor ===
Alan Tonks 19,153
(incumbent) Gayle Christie 18,910

=== Board of Control (2 elected) ===
(incumbent) Fergy Brown 20,420
(incumbent) Philip White 18,840
Michael McDonald 15,039

=== Council ===
Ward 1
Ben Nobleman 2,340
Evelyn Pollock 1,712

Ward 2
Michael Colle 2,465
Tony Mandarano 1,782

Ward 3
Tony Rizzo 2,306
Ron Bradd 2,159

Ward 4
Nicolo Fortunato 1,535
Patrick Canavan 1,255
George Solakis 723

Ward 5
Chris Tonks 3,801
Vito Caudillo 1,310

Ward 6
Lois Lane 1,644
Jacquie Chic 1,537
Ronald Crisp 1,503
Lloyd Sainsbury 1,018
Larry Giles 447

Ward 7
Gary Bloor 1,052
Fraser Romano 965
Frank Ruffalo 848
Richard Leonore 765
Andy Pappas 670
Lucas Cott 561
Martin Gordon 501
John Westman 357
Will Rosen 207
Hal Watson 89
