= Giorgio Mammoliti =

Canadian politician (1961–2026)

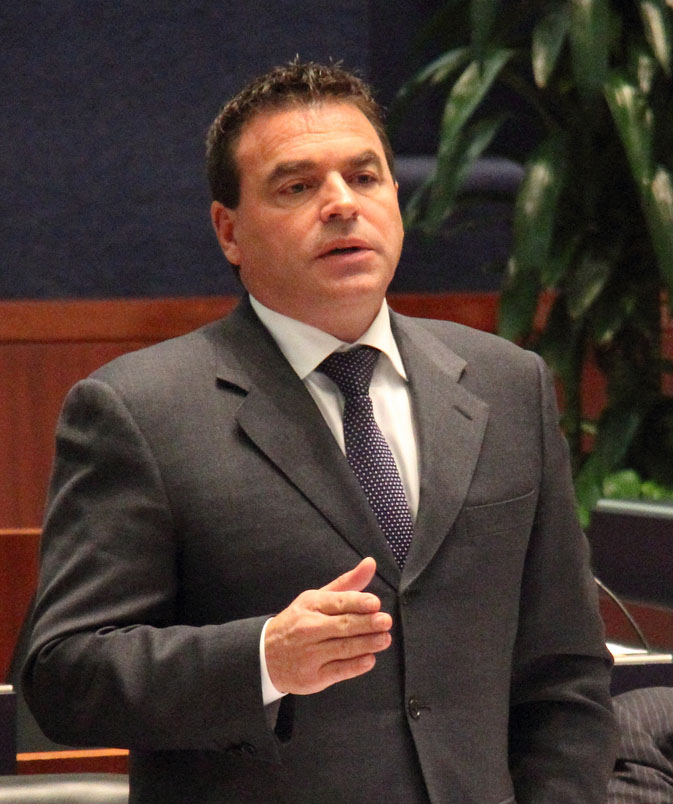
- Mammoliti in 2013

Toronto City Councillor for Ward 7 York West
- In office December 1, 2000 – December 1, 2018
- Preceded by: Ward created
- Succeeded by: Ward dissolved

Chair of the Parks and Environment Committee
- In office October 11, 2013 – November 30, 2014
- Preceded by: Paul Ainslie
- Succeeded by: Michelle Berardinetti

Chair of the Community Development and Recreation Committee
- In office December 1, 2010 – November 30, 2012
- Preceded by: Janet Davis
- Succeeded by: Jaye Robinson

Chair of the Affordable Housing Committee
- In office October 12, 2005 – December 1, 2010
- Preceded by: Committee formed
- Succeeded by: Ana Bailão

Chair of the Toronto Zoo
- In office January 1, 1998 – December 1, 2003
- Preceded by: Raymond Cho
- Succeeded by: Raymond Cho

Toronto City Councillor for Ward 6 North York Humber
- In office January 1, 1998 – December 1, 2000
- Preceded by: Ward created
- Succeeded by: Ward dissolved

North York City Councillor for Ward 1
- In office 1995 – January 1, 1998
- Preceded by: Mario Sergio
- Succeeded by: Ward dissolved

Member of Provincial Parliament for Yorkview
- In office September 6, 1990 – June 7, 1995
- Preceded by: Claudio Polsinelli
- Succeeded by: Mario Sergio

Personal details
- Born: George Mammoliti; September 20, 1961 Toronto, Ontario, Canada
- Died: February 25, 2026 (aged 64) Toronto, Ontario, Canada
- Party: People's (federal); Progressive Conservative (provincial)
- Other political affiliations: New Democratic (1990–1997)
- Spouse: Monica Calligaro (m. 2005; div. 2010)
- Occupation: Landscaper, labour organizer

Giorgio Mammoliti (/ˈdʒɔːrdʒoʊ ˌmæməˈliːti/ JOR-joh MAM-ə-LEE-tee, Italian: [ˈdʒordʒo mammoˈliːti]) (September 20, 1961—February 25, 2026) was a Canadian politician in Toronto.

== Early career ==
Prior to entering politics he was a landscaper with the then Metro Toronto Housing Authority and a labour union president, rising to become head of the Canadian Union of Public Employees Local 767. He represented the riding of Yorkview for the New Democratic Party in the Legislative Assembly of Ontario from 1990 to 1995, and Ward 7 York West on the Toronto City Council from 2000 to 2018, running unsuccessfully for mayor of Toronto in 2010 and 2023. In 2003, he changed his name from the anglicized George to the Italian Giorgio.

== Ontario Legislative Assembly ==
At age 28, Mammoliti ran for the New Democratic Party (NDP) in the riding of Yorkview in the 1990 provincial elections for the Ontario Legislative Assembly. He won, upsetting the Liberal incumbent Claudio Polsinelli by 1,619 votes. The governing Liberals had initially been leading in polls but were beset by several scandals, as well as public cynicism due to an early election call. The NDP won majority government and on October 1, 1990, Mammoliti was appointed parliamentary assistant to the minister responsible for the provincial anti-drug strategy. He later served as the parliamentary assistant for two other ministers.

While in the legislature, Mammoliti was one of the strongest critics of same-sex marriage. He said: "I believe that children pick up from their parents and if we extend the definition of spouse and open up traditional families, those children will be influenced in a way that we'll never, ever forget." He was one of 12 NDP Members to break ranks and vote against the Rae government's proposed Bill 167, leading to the Bill's proposal to grant same-sex marriage rights being defeated on June 9, 1994.

In the 1995 provincial election, Mammoliti was defeated by Liberal city councillor Mario Sergio by almost 3,000 votes. Sergio left his North York council seat to move to the Ontario Legislature, and Mammoliti decided to run in the by-election to replace him in North York. He was opposed by his old rival Polsinelli, but won the election without difficulty.

== Toronto City Council ==
Mammoliti represented Ward 7 York West, one of the two York West wards, from 1995 to 1998. When North York and other municipalities were merged to form the new City of Toronto in 1997, Mammoliti was elected to the newly constituted Toronto City Council.

Mammoliti was generally considered a right-leaning and socially conservative member of council and was an outspoken supporter of Toronto Police Chief Julian Fantino, spearheading an unsuccessful effort to pressure the Toronto Police Services Board to renew Fantino's contract. During his time on the council, he quit the NDP and joined the Liberal Party, a decision which did not affect his standing on council as all Toronto councillors are elected as independents.

On council, he was noted for his unsuccessful attempt to lure a National Hockey League team to North York, and his highest profile role was as the chair of the Board of the Toronto Zoo. He also served as Chair of the Affordable Housing Committee, Co-chair of Canada Municipalities Housing Action Network for the Federation of Canadian Municipalities (FCM), and Chair of Toronto's International Committee.

Mammoliti had an ongoing and bitter dispute with fellow councillor, and later mayor, Rob Ford. Although the two represented neighbouring wards and were both generally right-wing, they were frequently in conflict, mostly over Ford's fiscal conservatism and Mammoliti's office budgets. In one argument Ford reportedly called Mammoliti "Gino Boy", which was taken as an anti-Italian slur. As a result of Ford's comment, Mammoliti filed a human rights complaint against Ford. Mammoliti's son Michael filed papers to run against Ford in the 2003 municipal election but withdrew at the last moment, with Mammoliti instead supporting John Tory's bid to become mayor and displace Ford. In 2007, Mammoliti called for an investigation of Ford and Doug Holyday after they filed total 2006 expenses of $0 and $1,471 respectively.

He was a member of the Mayor's executive committee until he resigned on November 26, 2012, when then-mayor Rob Ford was found guilty of governmental conflict of interest. Ford was ordered removed from office due to a complaint regarding his use of city stationery to raise money for his own charity. This order was suspended and the initial judgement was overturned on appeal, with Mammoliti re-joining the executive committee in October 2013.

== Mayoral campaigns ==
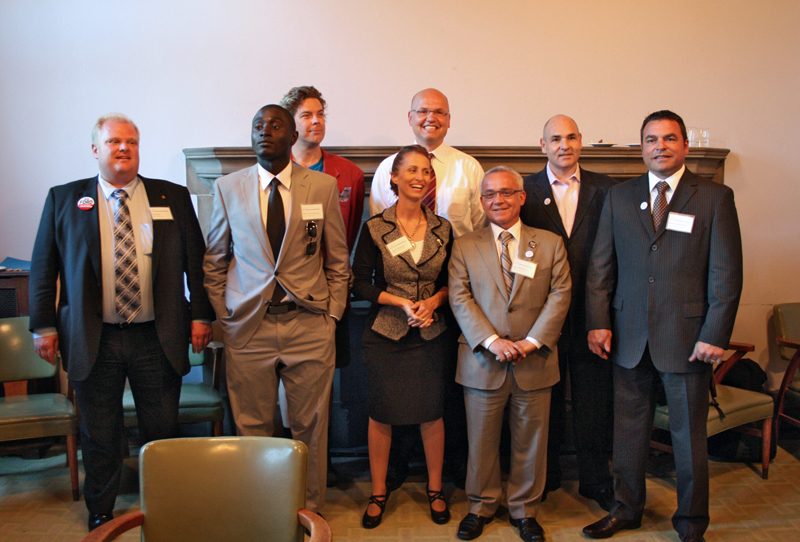
Mammoliti at a 2010 candidates debate

On January 5, 2010, Mammoliti filed his nomination papers to run for mayor in the 2010 City of Toronto elections. His platform included building a floating casino, introducing a municipal lottery, reversing tax increases he had he previously voted for, creating a red light district for prostitution, an 11.00 pm curfew for children under the age of 14, and giving guns to by-law enforcement officers. He promised budget cuts targeting the $40 million in annual city grants to arts, cultural and community groups, but opposing cuts to salaries for elected officials. He called for cars to be banned from the Gardiner Expressway, the converting of the thoroughfare into a garden, and implementing road tolls on other major routes. After campaigning for six months without polling above single digits, Mammoliti announced his withdrawal from the contest on July 5, 2010, in order to run for re-election as a city councillor.

On October 22, 2018, Mammoliti lost his re-election bid for Toronto City Council. He then announced he would re-enter provincial politics, and seek the Progressive Conservative Party of Ontario nomination in Brampton Centre. Thirteen days later he decided against such a run, citing his "difficult decision to continue to represent the City of Toronto" by remaining in municipal politics. In 2018, Mammoliti moved from the Greater Toronto Area to Wasaga Beach, Ontario and in the spring of 2022 again registered as a candidate for Mayor of Wasaga Beach in the 2022 Simcoe County municipal elections. His platform included lowering property taxes, improving municipal services, and opposing the sale of beachfront property to developers. He placed third in the race with 2,363 votes, constituting 20.3% of the vote. Following this campaign, he announced his retirement from municipal politics, but still ran as the People's Party of Canada candidate for the federal electoral district of Simcoe—Grey in the 2025 Canadian federal election.

On March 15, 2023, Mammoliti announced his entry in the 2023 Toronto Mayoral By-Election race, but on June 23, he suspended his campaign and announced his endorsement of Anthony Furey. As the voter list had been finalized on May 26, Mammoliti's name remained on the ballot. He received 1,105 votes, finishing in 13th place.

== Controversies ==
Mammoliti was no stranger to controversy, and the timeline of his political career can be measured by the contentious issues in which he was involved.

In June 2010, Mammoliti and then-fellow councillor Rob Ford co-sponsored a motion to deny city funding to the Toronto Gay Pride Parade if it did not ban the group Queers Against Israeli Apartheid (QuAIA) from participating. On July 3, he attended the 2010 Toronto Dyke March where he was seen recording the presence of QuAIA with a video camera.

In March 2011, Mammoliti attracted attention for proposing a red-light district on the Toronto Islands, a proposal that was opposed by both island residents and sex workers. Mammoliti argued that it would generate tourism and make it easier for the city to tax and regulate brothels.

In July 2011, the executive committee of Toronto City Council heard deputations by 169 Toronto citizens on the hundreds of millions of dollars in budget cuts suggested by KPMG consultants. Mammoliti claimed there were "very few" worthwhile deputations and described the event as a "socialist party".

In August 2011, in response to the July executive committee meeting being late, Mammoliti launched a "Save the City ... Support the Ford Administration" Facebook group. He indicated that he created the group so that the "taxpayer" would have an opportunity to comment on how municipal taxes should be spent in Toronto and stated: "If you smell like someone who can be a part of the Communist Party you're not going to be welcome on the site." On August 11, Mammoliti suggested the "communist movement" hides in the NDP and added that he wants to "weed out the communists in this city."

On February 4, 2013, the city's compliance audit committee voted to commence legal proceedings against Mammoliti after an audit found his 2010 election campaign exceeded the authorized spending limit by more than $12,000. On October 12, 2013, the Toronto Sun published an op-ed by Mammoliti, opposing plans to build the Finch LRT.

In December 2013, the City of Toronto's integrity commissioner opened an investigation into a $5000-a-table Mammoliti fundraiser attended by lobbyists that netted him $80,000. On July 9, 2014, Toronto City Council voted to suspend Mammoliti and withhold his salary for three months for holding the fundraisers, also authorizing a review of the fundraisers for any criminality.

In June 2014, Mammoliti angered many people when he suggested Parkdale was a district full of paedophiles, and that all-ages shows attract paedophiles.

In a 2017 episode of the television series Political Blind Date, Mammoliti and Matt Brown discussed their differing perspectives on the issue of safe injection sites.

In an appearance on the right-wing website The Rebel Media during the lead-up to the 2018 Toronto municipal election, Mammoliti was criticized by his constituents for likening social housing residents with criminal records to cockroaches. In an election ad in September 2018, Mammoliti was shown as ready to swing a sledgehammer under the words, "Saving our community begins with knocking down social housing". In a subsequent interview however, the candidate clarified his position: "This ad speaks to two things. First is the sledgehammer because we need to eliminate the segregation at Jane and Finch which has been the poor pocket of the city for 50 years. Four generations of children are angry, segregated and shooting each other. The decrepit housing has mould and needs to come down the way things happened in Regent Park and Lawrence Heights. It's our turn now". Mammoliti refused to apologize after being asked to in a debate with opposing candidate Tiffany Ford, and went online to attack Ford on her own campaign Facebook page. "At least I have a plan to take you out of segregation, a white man does. Your black candidates don't speak of how they will do that. They will just keep you bottled up in a poverty, segregated world with no hope. Wake up!!!!!", he wrote.

In May 2023, Mammoliti replied to a critical comment on his Twitter campaign account, saying the author "could use a shot in the face". Twitter subsequently suspended Mammoliti's campaign account on June 11, citing "violent threats".

== Death ==
On February 25, 2026, Mammoliti had an accidental fall down the stairs of his home in Wasaga Beach, Ontario. He was rushed to Sunnybrook Health Sciences Centre in Toronto where he was put on life support, but was shortly pronounced dead at the age of 64. He had previously undergone emergency surgery in 2013 for a fistula in his brain.

Mammoliti's son, Christopher Mammoliti, served on the Toronto District School Board and ran for Giorgio's former city council seat in 2022.

== Electoral record ==
2025 Canadian federal election: Simcoe—Grey
Party	Candidate	Votes	%	±%
Conservative	Terry Dowdall	35,364	52.08	+4.65
Liberal	Bren Munro	29,455	43.38	+15.49
New Democratic	Jasleen Bains	1,574	2.32	−10.86
Green	Allan Kuhn	991	1.46	−2.69
People's	Giorgio Mammoliti	523	0.77	−6.17
Total valid votes		67,907	99.41	
Total rejected ballots		402	0.59	+0.01
Turnout		68,309	71.45	+6.73
Eligible voters		95,606		
Conservative notional hold		Swing		−5.42
Source: Elections Canada

2023 Toronto mayoral by-election
Candidate	Votes	%
Olivia Chow	268,676	37.17
Ana Bailão	234,647	32.46
Mark Saunders	62,017	8.58
Anthony Furey	35,839	4.96
Josh Matlow	35,516	4.91
Mitzie Hunter	21,170	2.93
Chloe Brown	18,763	2.60
Brad Bradford	9,234	1.28
Chris Saccoccia	7,981	1.10
Anthony Perruzza	3,017	0.42
Xiao Hua Gong	2,975	0.41
Lyall Sanders	2,766	0.38
Giorgio Mammoliti	1,097	0.15
89 remaining candidates	19,179	2.65
Total	722,877	100

2022 Wasaga Beach mayoral election
Candidate	Votes	%
Brian Smith	4,477	38.47
Nina Bifolchi (X)	2,937	25.23
Giorgio Mammoliti	2,363	20.30
Leslie Farkas	1,862	16.00

2018 Toronto municipal election, Ward 7 Humber River—Black Creek
Candidate	Votes	%
Anthony Perruzza	8,336	36.80
Giorgio Mammoliti	5,625	24.83
Deanna Sgro	4,512	19.92
Tiffany Ford	3,187	14.07
Amanda Coombs	445	1.96
Winston La Rose	247	1.09
Kerry-Ann Thomas	153	0.68
Kristy-Ann Charles	147	0.65
Total	22,652	100
Source: City of Toronto

2014 Toronto election, Ward 7
Candidate	Votes	%
Giorgio Mammoliti	6,816	46.08
Nick Di Nizio	5,274	35.65
John Chambers	827	5.59
Harp Brar	536	3.62
Chris Mac Donald	528	3.57
Keegan Henry-Mathieu	471	3.18
Larry Perlman	202	1.37
Scott Aitchison	139	0.94
Total	14,793	100

2010 Toronto election, Ward 7
Candidate	Votes	%
Giorgio Mammoliti	5,338	43.8
Nick Di Nizio	3,601	29.5
Victor Lucero	1,038	8.5
Sergio Gizzo	706	5.8
Sharon Joseph	547	4.5
Chris MacDonald	491	4.0
Larry Perlman	249	2.0
Scott Aitchison	129	1.1
Stefano Tesoro	89	0.7
Total	12,188	100

2006 Toronto election, Ward 7
Candidate	Votes	%
Giorgio Mammoliti	5,877	62.6
Sandra Anthony	2,753	29.3
Larry Perlman	495	5.3
Fred Cutler	258	2.8

1995 Ontario general election
Party	Candidate	Votes	Vote %
Liberal	Mario Sergio	9,245	47.0
New Democrat	George Mammoliti	6,447	32.8
Progressive Conservative	Danny Varaich	3,989	20.3
Total		19681	
Rejected, unmarked and declined ballots		320	
Turnout		20,021	60.8
Electors on list		32,827	

1990 Ontario general election
Party	Candidate	Votes	Vote %
New Democrat	George Mammoliti	9,944	49.5
Liberal	Claudio Polsinelli	8,320	41.5
Progressive Conservative	Pedro Cordoba	1,249	6.2
Libertarian	Roma Kelembet	325	1.6
Independent	Lucylle Boikoff	233	1.2
	Total	20,071	
