= Fred Young (Ontario politician) =

Canadian politician

Ontario MPP
- In office 1963–1981
- Preceded by: New riding
- Succeeded by: Michael Spensieri
- Constituency: Yorkview

Personal details
- Born: 14 February 1907 Long Reach, New Brunswick
- Died: 13 December 1993 (aged 86) Toronto, Ontario
- Party: New Democrat
- Other political affiliations: Co-operative Commonwealth Federation
- Spouse: Winifred Young
- Children: 2
- Occupation: United Church minister

Fred Matthews Young (14 February 1907 – 13 December 1993) was a politician in Ontario, Canada. He was a New Democratic member of the Legislative Assembly of Ontario from 1963 to 1981 who represented the riding of Yorkview. He was an ordained minister in the United Church of Canada and a long time organizer for the Co-operative Commonwealth Federation (CCF).

== Background ==
Young was born in Long Reach, New Brunswick, near the port city of Saint John, in 1907. He attended Teachers College in Fredericton, New Brunswick and taught school in Woodstock, New Brunswick. Later on, he graduated with a Bachelor of Arts degree from Mount Allison University. He attended the University of Toronto and received both a Master of Arts and a bachelor's degree in divinity. He served as a minister in the United Church of Canada, in both Nova Scotia and Prince Edward Island from 1934 until 1940. He and his wife Winnifred raise two children, a boy and a girl.

== Politics ==
After World War II, Young worked, as an organizer for the CCF in the Maritimes, being personally recruited by the CCF's national secretary, David Lewis. Though, officially, he was a staff representative for the United Steel Workers of America, he was co-opted by the party. He travelled throughout Atlantic Canada and Ontario mostly doing work for the party. In May 1951, the Ontario CCF hired him, at the urging of Donald C. MacDonald, then the CCF's national organizer, who persuade Young to relocate from the Maritimes. He became the Ontario party's full-time organizer.

In 1953, he ran for the leadership of the Ontario CCF, losing by six votes to Donald C. MacDonald in the CCF leadership convention. After five unsuccessful attempts to gain a public office, he won election to the town council of North York, Ontario in 1955. He served as deputy reeve and chair of the executive committee.

He attempted on several occasions to win a seat for the CCF and its successor, the New Democratic Party (NDP) either at the federal or provincial level. He finally won election to the Legislative Assembly of Ontario in the 1963 provincial election for the North York riding of Yorkview. Young sat as an Ontario New Democratic Party Member of Provincial Parliament (MPP) from 1963 until 1981.

He was a friend of consumer advocate Ralph Nader. Both Nader and Young, as a legislator, fought for highway safety and mandatory use of seat belts. He was also an early advocate of airbags. In 1975, the Ontario government enacted the mandatory seatbelt reforms that he was advocating for years. As a legislator, Young became one of the first MPPs to open a community office to help his riding constituents. He was also responsible for writing the daily prayer used in the Legislative Assembly of Ontario throughout the later half of the 20th century.

== Later life ==
Following his career in politics, the City of North York honoured him by naming a small park adjacent to York University after him in 1990. Young was hospitalized for many weeks at the York-Finch General Hospital before his death on Monday, 13 December 1993.

== Electoral record ==
1953 Canadian federal election: Davenport, Toronto
Party	Candidate	Votes	%	±%
Liberal	Paul Hellyer	8,919	41.1	+2.1
Progressive Conservative	Harold McBride	6,998	32.3	-3.5
Co-operative Commonwealth	Fred Young	4,968	22.9	-2.3
Labor–Progressive	Hector Harold MacArthur	802	3.7	
Total valid votes		21,687	100.0	
