= 1953 Ontario Co-operative Commonwealth Federation leadership election =

Leadership election of the Ontario Co-operative Commonwealth Federation

- Date: 21 November 1953
- Convention: Royal Canadian Legion Hall, College St, Toronto, Ontario
- Resigning leader: Ted Jolliffe
- Won by: Donald C. MacDonald
- Ballots: 2
- Candidates: 3

The 1953 Ontario Co-operative Commonwealth Federation leadership election was held on 21 November 1953 in Toronto, Ontario, to elect a successor to Ted Jolliffe as leader of the Ontario Co-operative Commonwealth Federation (CCF). The convention resulted in the election of Donald C. MacDonald on the second ballot over Fred Young, following the elimination of Andrew Brewin on the first ballot.

The convention marked a major transition in Ontario social democratic politics. MacDonald succeeded Jolliffe, who had led the Ontario CCF since 1942 and had overseen the party's breakthrough to Official Opposition status in the 1943 Ontario general election.

== Background ==
Ted Jolliffe had served as leader of the Ontario CCF since 1942. Under his leadership, the party won 34 seats in the 1943 Ontario general election and became the Official Opposition, coming within a small number of seats of forming government.

The party's electoral fortunes declined during the late 1940s and early 1950s. In the 1951 Ontario general election, Jolliffe lost his seat in York South while the CCF's representation was sharply reduced. Following the election, Jolliffe announced his resignation as leader in August 1953.

During the period between Jolliffe's resignation and the leadership convention, the party's legislative caucus was led by House Leader William J. Grummett.

== Candidates ==
=== Donald C. MacDonald ===
Donald C. MacDonald was the national organizer and national treasurer of the CCF. A prominent party organizer, he was associated with efforts to rebuild the Ontario party following its electoral setbacks and enjoyed strong support among younger activists and party organizers.

=== Fred Young ===
Fred Young was a labour leader and political action representative for the United Steelworkers. He had played a significant role in maintaining the Ontario CCF's organizational structure during the difficult years following the 1951 election.

=== Andrew Brewin ===
Andrew Brewin was a Toronto lawyer, civil liberties advocate, and longtime CCF activist. Brewin was regarded as one of the party's leading intellectual figures and had been active in the Ontario CCF since its early years.

== Nominations ==
Several prominent figures were nominated but declined to stand for the leadership. According to later accounts, these included former Member of Parliament Agnes Macphail, former MPP Eamon Park, labour leader Charles Millard, former Toronto alderman William Dennison, and House Leader William J. Grummett.

== Convention ==
The convention was held at the Royal Canadian Legion Hall on College Street in Toronto on 21 November 1953.

Contemporary observers described the leadership race as unusually low-key by later standards. MacDonald later recalled that the campaign lacked the extensive organization, promotional materials, and delegate operations associated with later leadership conventions. Nevertheless, significant organizing and delegate recruitment took place behind the scenes.

Fred Young led on the first ballot with 154 votes, followed by MacDonald with 127 and Brewin with 75. After Brewin's elimination, most of his supporters transferred their support to MacDonald, allowing him to win on the second ballot by a margin of six votes.

According to MacDonald's later recollections, the ballot totals were not publicly announced at the convention and were reconstructed years afterward through interviews and historical research.

== Results ==
= Eliminated from next round
= Winner

Delegate support by ballot
Candidate	1st Ballot		2nd Ballot		
Name	Votes	%	Votes	%	+/− (pp)
Donald C. MacDonald	127	35.7	181	50.8	+15.1
Fred Young	154	43.3	175	49.2	+5.9
Andrew Brewin	75	21.1	Eliminated		
Total	356	100.0	356	100.0	0

== Aftermath ==
MacDonald's election began a leadership tenure that lasted until 1970. He immediately undertook efforts to rebuild the Ontario CCF's organization, working closely with party officials and labour unions that had helped sustain the party following its 1951 setbacks.

The first provincial election fought under MacDonald's leadership was the 1955 Ontario general election. Although the party won only three seats, MacDonald himself regained York South and entered the Legislative Assembly of Ontario for the first time as leader.

MacDonald later played a central role in negotiations that led to the formation of the Ontario New Democratic Party in 1961 and became the first leader of the new party.

Historians have regarded the 1953 convention as the beginning of the transition from the wartime Ontario CCF to the modern Ontario NDP.
