= Michael Hollingsworth (writer) =

Canadian writer

- Born: February 5, 1950 (age 76); Swansea, Wales
- Occupations: playwright, theatre director
- Spouse: Deanne Taylor
- Writing career
- Period: 1970s-present
- Notable work: The History of the Village of the Small Huts
- Website: www.videocab.com

Michael John Hollingsworth (born February 5, 1950) is a Canadian playwright, theatre director and experimental multimedia artist. He is best known for The History of the Village of the Small Huts, a series of 21 historical plays dramatizing and satirizing Canadian history.

Born in Swansea, Wales, Hollingsworth moved to Toronto, Ontario with his family at the age of six. After studying fine arts at York University, Hollingsworth's first play Strawberry Fields was produced by Toronto's Factory Theatre in 1972, and his second, Clear Light, was produced by Toronto Free Theatre in 1973.

In 1976, he collaborated with Deanne Taylor to launch VideoCabaret, an experimental theatre company which was one of the first in Canada to integrate multimedia techniques such as video and live music. Early shows produced by VideoCabaret included Taylor's The Patty Rehearst Story, The Bible As Told to Karen Ann Quinlan, Nympho Warrior and Where's Fluffy, Hollingsworth's Punc Rok and Electric Eye, and adaptations of Aldous Huxley's Brave New World and George Orwell's 1984.

Following the Repatriation of the Canadian Constitution in 1982, Hollingsworth began to write The History of the Village of the Small Huts, beginning with Part 1: New France in 1985; Part 2: The British followed in 1986. These two shows each consisted of four distinct one-act plays dramatizing individual personalities from the eras, while later plays in the series — The Mackenzie Papineau Rebellion, Confederation, The Red River Rebellion, Canadian Pacific Scandal, The Saskatchewan Rebellion, Laurier, The Great War, The Life and Times of Mackenzie King, WWII, The Cold War, Trudeau & the FLQ, Trudeau & the PQ and The Life and Times of Brian Mulroney — have each been standalone works.

He has won two Floyd S. Chalmers Canadian Play Awards, in 1986 for New France and in 1995 for The Life and Times of Mackenzie King, and a Dora Mavor Moore Award for Outstanding New Play in 2004 for Confederation.
