= 2022 Simcoe County municipal elections =

Local election in Ontario, Canada

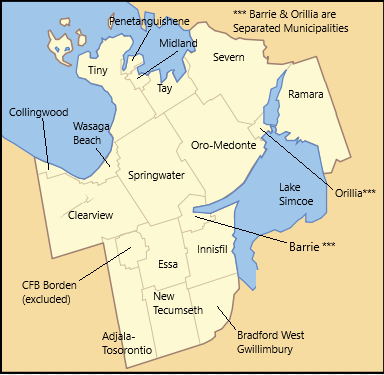
Map of Simcoe County, its component municipalities, Separated municipalities and CFB Borden.

Elections were held in Simcoe County, Ontario on October 24, 2022 in conjunction with municipal elections across the province.

== Simcoe County Council ==
The county council consists of the mayors and deputy mayors of the municipalities.

Office	Elected
Mayor of Adjala-Tosorontio	Scott W. Anderson
Deputy Mayor of Adjala-Tosorontio	Julius Lachs
Mayor of Bradford West Gwillimbury	James Leduc
Deputy Mayor of Bradford West Gwillimbury	Raj Sandhu
Mayor of Clearview	Doug Measures (acclaimed)
Deputy Mayor of Clearview	Paul Van Staveren
Mayor of Collingwood	Yvonne Hamlin
Deputy Mayor of Collingwood	Tim Fryer
Mayor of Essa	Sandie Macdonald (acclaimed)
Deputy Mayor of Essa	Michael Smith (acclaimed)
Mayor of Innisfil	Lynn Dollin
Deputy Mayor of Innisfil	Kenneth Fowler
Mayor of Midland	Bill Gordon
Deputy Mayor of Midland	Jack Contin
Mayor of New Tecumseth	Richard Norcross
Deputy Mayor of New Tecumseth	Stepahnie MacLellan
Mayor of Oro-Medonte	Randy Greenlaw
Deputy Mayor of Oro-Medonte	Appointed from council
Mayor of Penetanguishene	Douglas Rawson
Deputy Mayor of Penetanguishene	Dan LaRose
Mayor of Ramara	Basil Clarke
Deputy Mayor of Ramara	Keith Bell
Mayor of Severn	Mike Burkett
Deputy Mayor of Severn	Judith Cox
Mayor of Springwater	Jennifer Coughlin
Deputy Mayor of Springwater	George Cabral
Mayor of Tay	Ted Walker (acclaimed)
Deputy Mayor of Tay	Barry Norris (acclaimed)
Mayor of Tiny	David Evans
Deputy Mayor of Tiny	Sean Miskimins
Mayor of Wasaga Beach	Brian Smith
Deputy Mayor of Wasaga Beach	Tanya Snell

== Adjala-Tosorontio ==
The following were the results for mayor and deputy mayor of Adjala-Tosorontio.

=== Mayor ===
Mayoral Candidate	Vote	%
Scott W. Anderson	1,608	44.89
Floyd Pinto (X)	1,123	31.35
Clay Birkett	851	23.76

=== Deputy mayor ===
Deputy mayoral candidate	Vote	%
Julius Lachs	1,828	52.99
Deborah Hall-Chancey	1,622	47.01

== Bradford West Gwillimbury ==
The following were the results for mayor, deputy mayor and town council of Bradford West Gwillimbury.

=== Mayor ===
Incumbent mayor Rob Keffer has announced his retirement.

Mayoral Candidate	Vote	%
James Leduc	4,892	53.23
Mauro DiGiovanni	3,202	34.84
Antonio Garcia	646	7.03
Michael Lotter	451	4.91

=== Deputy mayor ===
Deputy Mayoral Candidate	Vote	%
Raj Sandhu	5,705	62.27
Brent Fellman	3,457	37.73

=== Bradford West Gwillimbury Town Council ===
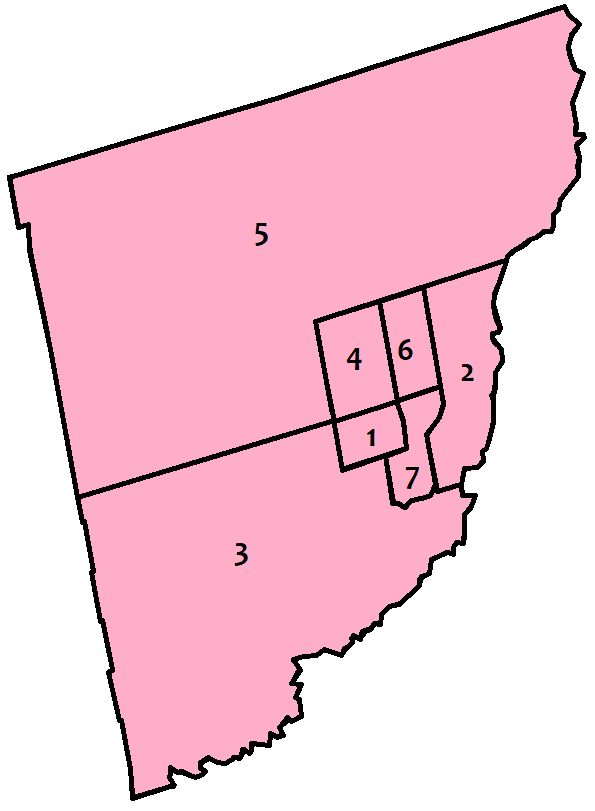
Map of Bradford West Gwillimbury's seven new wards first used in this election

Candidate	Vote	%
Ward 1
Cheraldean Duhaney	640	34.92
Randy Hutchings	441	24.06
Al Bonura	394	21.49
Rahmat Mansoor	235	12.82
Aftab Hussain	123	6.71
Ward 2
Jonathan Scott (X)	1,008	79.37
Carlos Botelho	262	20.63
Ward 3
Ben Verkaik	224	46.96
Gary R. Lamb (X)	201	42.14
Gavin Maclean	52	10.90
Ward 4
Joseph Giordano	576	41.00
Rick Turner	503	35.80
Zahid Kahlon	198	14.09
Iftikhar Ahmad	128	9.11
Ward 5
Peter Ferragine (X)	503	56.39
Munawar Chudary	389	43.61
Ward 6
Nickolas Harper	676	38.83
Jennifer Harrison	577	33.14
Mark Contois (X)	488	28.03
Ward 7
Peter Dykie Jr. (X)	794	48.39
Steph Sinclair	754	45.95
Nathan Harris	93	5.67

== Clearview ==
The following were the results for mayor and deputy mayor of Clearview.

=== Mayor ===
Mayoral Candidate	Vote	%
Doug Measures (X)	Acclaimed	

=== Deputy mayor ===
Deputy mayoral candidate	Vote	%
Paul Van Staveren	2,402	59.56
Deborah Ann Bronee	1,157	28.69
Chuck Arrand	474	11.75

== Collingwood ==
The following were the results for mayor and deputy mayor of Collingwood.

=== Mayor ===
Previous mayor Brian Saunderson was elected in the 2022 Ontario general election for the Progressive Conservative Party of Ontario in Simcoe—Grey. He was replaced as mayor by Keith Hull on June 20.

Mayoral Candidate	Vote	%
Yvonne Hamlin	3,469	39.91
Norm Sandberg	2,635	30.32
Mariane McLeod	2,588	29.77

=== Deputy mayor ===
Deputy mayoral candidate	Vote	%
Tim Fryer	5,804	70.18
Bob Madigan	1,688	20.41
Jordan Fleming	778	9.41

== Essa ==
=== Mayor ===
Sandie Macdonald was re-elected as mayor of Essa by acclamation.

Mayoral Candidate	Vote	%
Sandie Macdonald (X)	Acclaimed	

=== Deputy mayor ===
Michael Smith was re-elected as deputy mayor of Essa by acclamation.

Deputy mayoral candidate	Vote	%
Michael Smith (X)	Acclaimed	

== Innisfil ==
The following results for mayor, deputy mayor and town council of Innisfil were as follows.

=== Mayor ===
Mayoral Candidate	Vote	%
Lynn Dollin (X)	4,509	57.51
Daniel Davidson	3,332	42.49

=== Deputy mayor ===
Deputy Mayoral Candidate	Vote	%
Kenneth Fowler	4,078	53.44
Rob Nicol	3,553	46.56

=== Innisfil Town Council ===
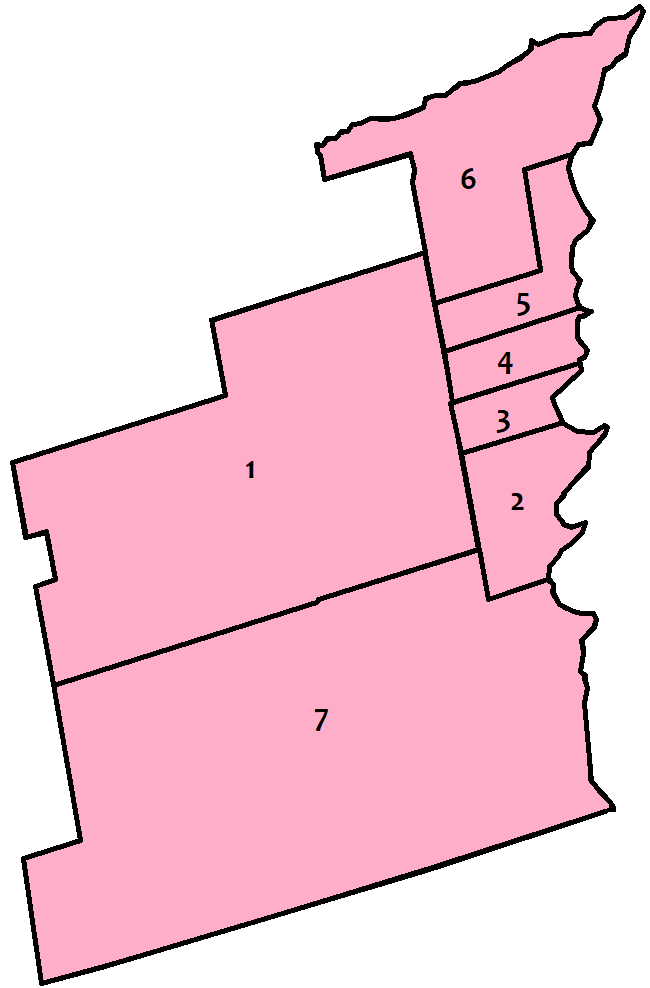
Map of Innisfil's seven wards

Candidate	Vote	%
Ward 1
Kevin Eisses (X)	584	69.52
Lynn Iwanow	256	30.48
Ward 2
Grace Constantine	511	40.75
Carol Griffith	501	39.95
Scott Jones	205	16.35
Anil Dutta	37	2.95
Ward 3
Jennifer Richardson	768	54.35
Andrew Harrigan	426	30.15
Naz Obredor	131	9.27
Leslie Pollak	88	6.23
Ward 4
Alex Waters (X)	545	61.03
Steven Fishman	348	38.97
Ward 5
Linda Zanella	173	31.12
Matthew Kenney	166	29.86
Jeanette Luchese-Jacobs	133	23.92
James Roncone	84	15.11
Ward 6
Robert Saunders	656	46.36
Megan Varga	502	35.48
Lisa Maxwell	257	18.16
Ward 7
Fred Drodge	915	70.17
Kevin Eckhardt	207	15.87
Jake Tucker	182	13.96

== Midland ==
The following were the results for mayor and deputy mayor of Midland.

=== Mayor ===
Mayoral Candidate	Vote	%
Bill Gordon	2,467	48.92
Jonathan Main	1,324	26.25
Stewart Strathearn (X)	1,148	22.76
Ute Schmid-Jones	104	2.06

=== Deputy mayor ===
Deputy mayoral candidate	Vote	%
Jack Contin	2,817	56.86
Cody Oschefski	2,137	43.14

== New Tecumseth ==
The following were the results for mayor, deputy mayor and town council of New Tecumseth.

=== Mayor ===
Incumbent mayor Rick Milne did not run for re-election. Running for mayor was deputy mayor Richard Norcross, and town councillor Donna Jebb, and Tony Veltri.

Mayoral Candidate	Vote	%
Richard Norcross	4,217	39.79
Donna Jebb	3,903	36.83
Tony Veltri	2,478	23.38

=== Deputy mayor ===
Deputy Mayoral Candidate	Vote	%
Stepahnie MacLellan	5,159	49.57
Michael Beattie	4,203	40.39
David Ghobrial	1,045	10.04

=== New Tecumseth Town Council ===
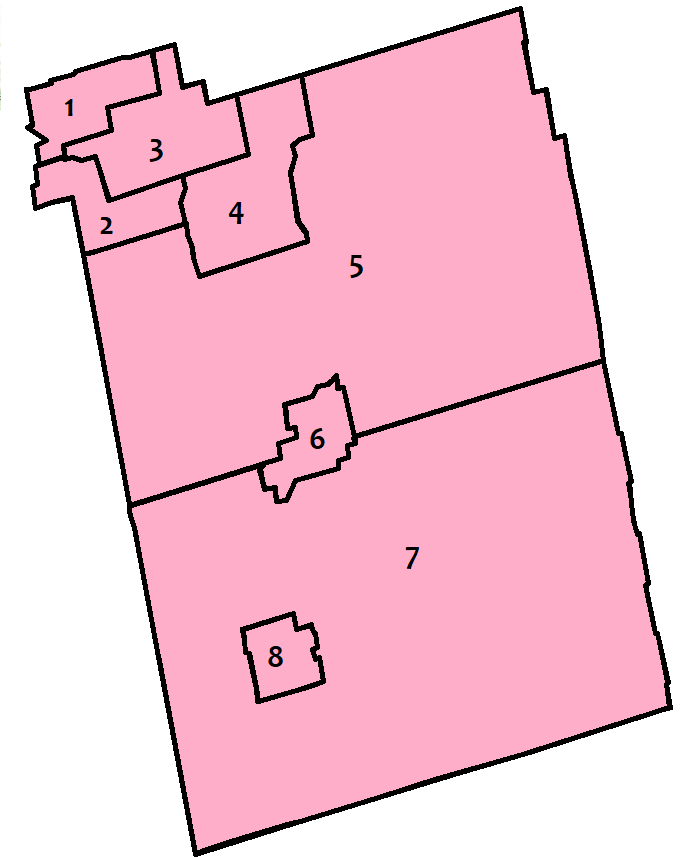
Map of New Tecumseth's eight wards

Candidate	Vote	%
Ward 1
Chris Rapin	737	51.55
Wayne Noye (X)	322	22.35
Terrina Williams	232	16.10
John Miller	108	7.49
Aemelia O'Callaghan	42	2.91
Ward 2
Wendy Gabrek	484	45.83
Jason Bowers	332	31.44
Robert Clements	166	15.72
Jaison Waldman	74	7.01
Ward 3
Paul Foster (X)	649	54.95
Laurie Mortimer	532	45.05
Ward 4
Alan Masters	889	56.23
Ashlie Drake	692	43.77
Ward 5
Marc Biss	355	38.13
Tony Phekoo	313	33.62
Mike Williams	263	28.25
Ward 6
Nicole Cox	781	53.64
Doug Kowalinski	592	40.66
Brandon Kyte	83	5.70
Ward 7
Shira Harrison McIntyre (X)	536	35.66
Joe Feiner	413	27.48
Guy Bonney	408	27.15
Peter Barbati	146	9.71
Ward 8
Andrea Jacks	777	56.30
Alan Lacey (X)	336	24.35
Jess Prothero	267	19.35

== Oro-Medonte ==
=== Mayor ===
The following were the results for mayor of Oro-Medonte.

Mayoral Candidate	Vote	%
Randy Greenlaw	4,793	66.82
Harry Hughes (X)	2,380	33.18

== Penetanguishene ==
=== Mayor ===
Incumbent mayor Doug Leroux ran for council. Running to replace him was former town councillor Doug Rawson and town councillor Jill St. Amant.

Mayoral Candidate	Vote	%
Douglas Rawson	1,808	61.88
Jill M. St. Amant	1,114	38.12

=== Deputy mayor ===
The following were the results for deputy mayor of Penetanguishene.

Deputy mayoral candidate	Vote	%
Dan LaRose	1,443	51.50
Brian Cummings	1,359	48.50

== Ramara ==
The following were the results for mayor and deputy mayor of Ramara.

=== Mayor ===
Incumbent mayor Basil Clarke was challenged by former township councillor Marg Sharpe in a re-match of the 2018 election.

Mayoral Candidate	Vote	%
Basil Clarke (X)	1,830	43.05
Marg Sharpe	1,687	39.68
Russ Cole	734	17.27

=== Deputy mayor ===
Deputy mayoral candidate	Vote	%
Keith Bell	1,457	34.93
Joe Gough (X)	1,400	33.57
Dave Readman	1,314	31.50

== Severn ==
The following were the results for mayor and deputy mayor of Severn.

=== Mayor ===
Mayoral Candidate	Vote	%
Mike Burkett (X)	3,740	87.49
Mark Gibbons	535	12.51

=== Deputy mayor ===
Deputy mayoral candidate	Vote	%
Judith Cox	2,372	55.18
Jane Dunlop (X)	1,927	44.82

== Springwater ==
The following were the results for mayor and deputy mayor of Springwater.

=== Mayor ===
Mayoral Candidate	Vote	%
Jennifer Coughlin	3,472	62.01
Perry Ritchie	1,706	30.47
Bill Haight	421	7.52

=== Deputy mayor ===
Deputy mayoral candidate	Vote	%
George Cabral	2,409	43.79
Wanda Maw-Champman	2,091	38.01
Dennis Gannon	1,001	18.20

== Tay ==
The following were the results for mayor and deputy mayor of Tay.

=== Mayor ===
Mayoral Candidate	Vote	%
Ted Walker (X)	Acclaimed	

=== Deputy mayor ===
Deputy mayoral candidate	Vote	%
Barry Norris	Acclaimed	

== Tiny ==
The following were the results for mayor and deputy mayor of Tiny.

=== Mayor ===
Running for mayor was former township councillor Tony Mintoff and sales and marketing manager David Evans. Incumbent mayor George Cornell did not for re-election.

Mayoral Candidate	Vote	%
David Evans	4,102	64.66
Tony Mintoff	2,242	35.34

=== Deputy mayor ===
Deputy mayoral candidate	Vote	%
Sean Miskimins	2,537	40.26
John Bryant	2,163	34.32
Steve Saltsman	1,602	25.42

== Wasaga Beach ==
The following were the results for mayor and deputy mayor of Wasaga Beach.

=== Mayor ===
Mayoral Candidate	Vote	%
Brian Smith	4,477	38.47
Nina Bifolchi (X)	2,937	25.23
Giorgio Mammoliti	2,363	20.30
Leslie Farkas	1,862	16.00

=== Deputy mayor ===
Deputy mayoral candidate	Vote	%
Tanya Snell	6,217	55.25
Sylvia Bray (X)	3,788	33.66
Ilona Matthews	1,248	11.09
