= Jim Renwick (politician) =

Canadian politician

James Alexander Renwick

Ontario MPP
- In office 1964–1984
- Preceded by: Robert Macaulay
- Succeeded by: David Reville
- Constituency: Riverdale

President of the New Democratic Party
- In office 1967–1969
- Preceded by: Eamon Park
- Succeeded by: Allan Blakeney

Personal details
- Born: November 29, 1917 Toronto, Ontario
- Died: November 28, 1984 (aged 66) Toronto, Ontario
- Party: New Democrat
- Spouse: Margaret Ellen Price Renwick
- Education: Trinity College, Toronto; Osgoode Hall Law School
- Profession: Lawyer

James Alexander Renwick (November 29, 1917 – November 28, 1984) was a politician in Ontario, Canada. He was a New Democratic member of the Legislative Assembly of Ontario from 1964 to 1984 who represented the downtown Toronto riding of Riverdale. He served as president of the Federal New Democratic Party from 1967 to 1969. He died while still in office.

== Background ==
Renwick came from a relatively privileged background. He attended Trinity College at the University of Toronto and Osgoode Hall Law School, and enlisted with the Canadian Army during World War II. He reached the rank of captain, and became an adjutant with the Canadian Armored Corps in the 28th Armored Regiment. He was captured by the Nazis at Falaise following D-Day, and was a prisoner-of-war for a time.

After returning to Canada, Renwick finished his legal studies in 1947 and became a corporate lawyer. Attorney-General Roy McMurtry, characterized Renwick as "one of the most brilliant corporate lawyers of his generation."

== Politics ==
Renwick been actively involved in Conservative campaigns, but was dissatisfied with the party. He then attended the 1960 Liberal "Thinkers' Conference," held at Queen's University at Kingston, Ontario, but was also dissatisfied.

He was impressed by the newly formed New Democratic Party (NDP), and joined the democratic socialist party after attending the Ontario New Democratic Party's 1962 founding convention. He campaigned for the Ontario party in the 1963 provincial election, and lost to Progressive Conservative candidate Stanley Randall by 4,456 votes in the Toronto constituency of Don Mills.

The next year, Renwick became the NDP's candidate for a by-election in the downtown Toronto riding of Riverdale, against Ontario Liberal leadership candidate Charles Templeton. Renwick's campaign team, led by future Ontario NDP leader Stephen Lewis, Gerald Caplan, and Marjorie Pinney developed an innovative technique of going door to door three times during the campaign to identify the party's likeliest voters, and then "pulling the vote" on election day. This system maximized the NDP's vote on election day and increased the overall turnout to over 60%, about one-third higher than the usual turnout for a by-election. The result was an upset victory for Renwick, while Templeton fell to third place. This campaign system was adopted by the NDP throughout Ontario, and was later copied by other parties.

The NDP experienced a major breakthrough in the 1967 provincial election, greatly increasing its representation in the legislature and emerging particularly strong in Toronto. Among the victors was Renwick's wife Margaret, who was elected in Scarborough Centre. Jim and Margaret Renwick were the first husband and wife ever to serve simultaneously in a Canadian provincial or federal legislature.

Despite this, many party members, and members of caucus, believed the party could have done better under new leadership. Donald C. MacDonald had led the Ontario NDP and its predecessor, the Cooperative Commonwealth Federation, since 1953, and was seen as out of touch with the younger, more radical mood of the 1960s. Renwick was persuaded to challenge MacDonald for the party leadership in 1968, but was defeated in a leadership vote.

Renwick was re-elected in 1971, 1975, 1977 and 1981, and remained a Member of Provincial Parliament until his death. Renwick was elected president of the federal NDP in 1967. In 1982, he was a prominent supporter of Richard Johnston's bid to lead the provincial NDP.

During his time in the legislature he was described as an "independent thinker and a tough and knowledgeable critic" of matters concerning law and justice. He died on November 28, 1984, after suffering a heart attack.
