= 1942 Ontario Co-operative Commonwealth Federation leadership election =

1942 leadership election of the Ontario CCF

- Date: April 3, 1942
- Convention: Hotel Carls-Rite, Toronto, Ontario
- Won by: Ted Jolliffe
- Ballots: 1
- Candidates: 2

The 1942 Ontario CCF leadership convention was held on April 3, 1942, at the Hotel Carls-Rite in Toronto, Ontario. It was the first leadership election of the Ontario section of the Co-operative Commonwealth Federation (CCF). Ted Jolliffe, a Toronto lawyer and party vice-president, defeated labour activist Murray Cotterill to become the party's first leader.

Jolliffe was elected on the first ballot. The vote totals were not released, but contemporary reports described his victory as overwhelming.

== Background ==
The Ontario CCF was established in 1932 as the provincial section of the Co-operative Commonwealth Federation. The party won no seats in the 1937 Ontario general election.

Before 1942, the party had no formal leader. Its president or chairman served as its principal spokesman. John Mitchell held this role during the 1934 and 1937 provincial elections. After becoming party president in 1941, former MPP Samuel Lawrence advocated the election of a formal leader.

The leadership election took place during the party's tenth annual convention.

== Candidates ==
=== Ted Jolliffe ===
Ted Jolliffe was a Toronto lawyer, former journalist, Rhodes Scholar, and vice-president of the Ontario CCF. Born in China to missionary parents, he studied at Oxford University, where he helped establish an Oxford branch of the CCF. Before seeking the leadership, he had twice contested federal elections as a CCF candidate.

=== Murray Cotterill ===
Murray Cotterill was secretary of the Toronto Labour Council and a former organizer of the Ontario CCF Youth Movement.

== Nominations ==
Seventeen individuals were nominated for the leadership. Fifteen declined to stand:

- Samuel Lawrence, Ontario CCF president and former MPP for Hamilton East
- Allan Schroeder of St. Catharines
- Joseph W. Noseworthy, MP for York West
- Charles Millard, Canadian executive director of the United Steelworkers of America
- Andrew Brewin, lawyer
- Agnes Macphail, former MP
- William Dennison, Toronto alderman
- David Lewis, CCF national secretary
- George Grube, University of Toronto professor and Toronto school trustee
- Everett Orlan Hall, teacher from London, Ontario
- John Mitchell, Hamilton alderman and former party president
- B. E. Leavens of Toronto
- Lou Isaacs
- William Grant of Peterborough
- Margaret Sedgewick of Toronto

Only Jolliffe and Cotterill accepted nomination and proceeded to the leadership vote.

== Convention ==
Delegates met at Toronto's Hotel Carls-Rite on April 3, 1942. Contemporary accounts reported attendance ranging from approximately 107 voting delegates to roughly 150 convention participants.

Jolliffe won the leadership on the first ballot. While the exact vote totals were not released, the Canadian Press reported that his margin was so large as to constitute "almost complete endorsement" by the delegates.

In addition to electing a leader, delegates debated policy resolutions concerning labour rights, agriculture, wartime economic management, and post-war reconstruction.

Following his election, Jolliffe criticized the government of Premier Mitchell Hepburn and called for expanded social welfare measures and greater economic security for workers and farmers.

== Aftermath ==
In the 1943 Ontario general election, the Ontario CCF won 34 seats and became the Official Opposition.

Jolliffe remained leader of the Ontario CCF until 1953.
