= Deanne Taylor =

Canadian actress and artist

- Born: November 24, 1946; Berkeley, California
- Died: December 15, 2020 (aged 74); Toronto, Ontario, Canada
- Other name: A. Hummer
- Education: University of Calgary
- Occupations: Playwright and Video artist
- Known for: 1982 Toronto municipal election, VideoCabaret
- Spouse: Michael Hollingsworth

Deanne Taylor (born November 24, 1946) was a Canadian actress, artist, and performer. At 9 years old, she starred in the television program Maggie Muggins. In 1982, she ran for mayor in the 1982 Toronto municipal election, under the pseudonym A. Hummer placing 2nd, against Art Eggleton. Together with husband Michael Hollingsworth, she founded theatre company VideoCabaret, creating several plays about the history of Canada. She is credited with creating a novel genre of 'stand-up journalism', and contributing to the culture of Toronto, Canada.

== Early life ==
She was born in Berkeley, California to academics Violet Mae (née Fowler) and Malcolm Gordon Taylor. At age 9 she landed the title role on the TV series Maggie Muggins. In 1956 at age 10, she appeared in 2 episodes of the Canadian series On Camera. In 1958 at age 12, she appeared on 2 episodes of CBC's General Motors Theatre.

After attending University of Calgary, she lived for 7 years in London and Morocco.

In 1971, Taylor returned to Toronto and formed the national Women & Film film-festival in 1973. In 1974, together with artists Marien Lewis and Bobbe Besold, she formed the Hummer Sisters, and staged a protest against a Toronto by-law regarding a community garden.

In 1976, she collaborated with writer Michael Hollingsworth to launch VideoCabaret, an experimental theatre company which was one of the first in Canada to integrate multimedia techniques such as video and live music.

Taylor appears in Jean-Luc Godard's documentary See You At Mao.

== 1982 election ==
In 1982 Taylor changed her name to A. Hummer, in order to run as a protest-candidate in the 1982 Toronto municipal election. She ran on the slogan "ART vs Art". The Hummer sisters then consisting of Taylor, Janet Burke and Jennifer Dean ran several fundraising events at The Cameron House. Some campaign content was notable for using Telidon - a Canadian pre-internet videotex/teletext service integrated into the show by Telidon/videotex artist Bill Perry.

When asked about the Hummer campaign, Eggleton suggested his opponents "get some rest and take Extra-Strength Tylenol." - a reference to the Chicago Tylenol murders occurring a month before. Eggleton later apologized.

The campaign received 12,000 votes, or 10% - a distant second to incumbent Art Eggleton. It was noteworthy for a protest candidate to get 10% of the vote - many more than a fringe candidate in Toronto history - even beating Eggleton on Ward's island. The campaign was noted for their novel use of video, and appeal to the Toronto youth of Queen Street.

== Post-election ==
Together with Hollingsworth, she produced a play-cycle about the History of Canada titled The History of the Village of the Small Huts. The play consists of many parts - “The Cold War — Part One,” was released in 1995, followed by “The Global Village,” and “The Life and Times of Brian Mulroney”.

They plays ran at Soulpepper and the Stratford Festival. It is being revived in 2022

She died in 2020 of pancreatic cancer at the age of 74. After her death, the theatre at 10 Busy Street was renamed Deanne Taylor Theatre.
