= 1970 Ontario New Democratic Party leadership election =

- October 4, 1970
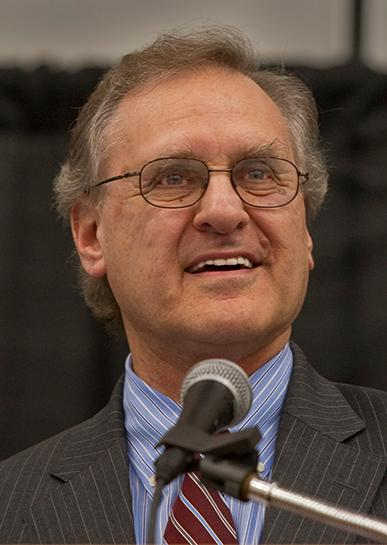
Candidate	Stephen Lewis	Walter Pitman	Douglas Campbell
Riding	Scarborough West	Peterborough	None
Final ballot	1,188 (64.18%)	642 (34.68%)	21 (1.13%)
Leader before election
Donald C. MacDonald
Elected Leader
Stephen Lewis

1970 Ontario New Democratic Party leadership election
- Date: October 4, 1970
- Convention: Royal York Hotel; Toronto, Ontario
- Resigning leader: Donald C. MacDonald
- Won by: Stephen Lewis
- Ballots: 1
- Candidates: 3

The 1970 Ontario New Democratic Party leadership election was held in Toronto, Ontario, on October 4, 1970, to elect a successor to Donald C. MacDonald as leader of the Ontario New Democratic Party (NDP). The election was necessary because MacDonald announced he would not seek re-election as leader at the party's 1970 convention. Stephen Lewis won on the first ballot, defeating Walter Pitman.

== Background ==
Outgoing ONDP leader Donald C. MacDonald was officially neutral, but quietly favoured Pitman.

Lewis was perceived to be the more left-wing of the two candidates. His victory was attributable to strong support from unions, particularly the United Steelworkers, as well as from younger party members.

== Candidates ==
=== Douglas Campbell ===
Douglas Campbell was a perennial candidate from Toronto. He was previously an independent candidate for St. Paul's in the 1962 federal election. Campbell worked as a teacher.

=== Stephen Lewis ===
Stephen Lewis was the Member of Provincial Parliament (MPP) for Scarborough West. He was first elected in the 1963 provincial election.

=== Walter Pitman ===
Walter Pitman was the Member of Provincial Parliament (MPP) for Peterborough. He was first elected in the 1967 provincial election. Before entering politics, he was a teacher.

Endorsements

- MPPs: (1) Morton Shulman (High Park)
- Municipal politicians: (1) Ruth Grier (Etobicoke Councillor)

== Voting results ==
Candidate	Votes	Percentage
Stephen Lewis	1,188	64.18
Walter Pitman	642	34.68
Douglas Campbell	21	1.13
Total	1,851	100
