= Yorkview =

Former provincial electoral district in Ontario, Canada

Ontario electoral district

Defunct provincial electoral district
- Legislature: Legislative Assembly of Ontario
- District created: 1963
- District abolished: 1996
- First contested: 1963
- Last contested: 1995

Demographics
- Census division: Toronto
- Census subdivision: Toronto

Yorkview was a provincial electoral district in Ontario, Canada, in the former city of North York from 1963 to 1999. The riding was established for the 1963 Ontario general election. The riding was abolished in preparation for the 1999 Ontario general election. It was partitioned into the current provincial ridings of York West, York Centre and York South—Weston.

Its first and longest-serving Member of Provincial Parliament (MPP) was Fred Young, who served the riding as an Ontario New Democratic Party (NDP) member, from 1963 until his retirement in 1981. The last MPP to represent the riding was Ontario Liberal Party member, Mario Sergio. Sergio went on to win the first election of the new riding of York West, which contained the majority of the former Yorkview riding.

== Boundaries ==
Its original boundaries were Steeles Avenue West on the north, the western boundary was the Humber River, the eastern boundary was Keele Street and the southern boundary meandered south from the Humber along Weston Road, east to Lawrence Avenue West, then south along Jane Street to Eglinton Avenue West.

In 1975 the riding boundaries were changed. From the southwest corner where Highway 401 crossed the Humber River the boundary followed the river north to Finch Avenue West. It then turned east following Finch to Highway 400. It then turned north following Highway 400 to Steeles Avenue West. It then followed Steeles east to Keele Street and then south along Keele to Sheppard Avenue West. It then went west along Sheppard to Jane Street and then south along Jane to Highway 401. It then followed Highway 401 back west to the Humber River.

The boundary changed again in 1987. From the southwest corner where Highway 401 crossed the Humber River the boundary followed the river north to Steeles Avenue West. It then turned east following Steeles until it reached Black Creek. It followed the river course south to Finch Avenue West. It then turned west following Finch to Keele Street. It then turned south following Keele until it reached Highway 401. It then followed Highway 401 back west to the Humber River.

== Members of Provincial Parliament ==
Yorkview
| Assembly | Years | Member | Party |
|---|---|---|---|
Created from part of York Centre
| 27th | 1963–1967 | Fred Young | New Democratic |
| 28th | 1967–1971 | Fred Young | New Democratic |
| 29th | 1971–1975 | Fred Young | New Democratic |
| 30th | 1975–1977 | Fred Young | New Democratic |
| 31st | 1977–1981 | Fred Young | New Democratic |
| 32nd | 1981–1985 | Michael Spensieri | Liberal |
| 33rd | 1985–1987 | Claudio Polsinelli | Liberal |
| 34th | 1987–1990 | Claudio Polsinelli | Liberal |
| 35th | 1990–1995 | Giorgio Mammoliti | New Democratic |
| 36th | 1995–1999 | Mario Sergio | Liberal |
Sourced from the Ontario Legislative Assembly
Merged into York West

== Election results ==
1963 Ontario general election
| Party | Candidate | Votes | Vote % |
|---|---|---|---|
| New Democrat | Fred Young | 7,652 | 39.0 |
| Liberal | William Lyon | 6,804 | 34.6 |
| Progressive Conservative | Isobel Walker | 5,185 | 26.2 |
| | Total | 19,641 | |

1967 Ontario general election
| Party | Candidate | Votes | Vote % |
|---|---|---|---|
| New Democrat | Fred Young | 13,941 | 46.7 |
| Liberal | Elvio DelZotta | 10,363 | 34.7 |
| Progressive Conservative | Joseph Gould | 5,535 | 18.5 |
| | Total | 29,839 | |

1971 Ontario general election
| Party | Candidate | Votes | Vote % |
|---|---|---|---|
| New Democrat | Fred Young | 20,540 | 43.7 |
| Liberal | Jim Fleming | 13,928 | 29.6 |
| Progressive Conservative | Michael O'Rourke | 12,547 | 26.7 |
| | Total | 47,015 | |

1975 Ontario general election
| Party | Candidate | Votes | Vote % |
|---|---|---|---|
| New Democrat | Fred Young | 13,428 | 52.5 |
| Liberal | Ben Bellantone | 8,077 | 31.6 |
| Progressive Conservative | Dorlene Hewitt | 3,460 | 13.5 |
| Communist | John Sweet | 602 | 2.4 |
| | Total | 25,567 | |

1977 Ontario general election
| Party | Candidate | Votes | Vote % |
|---|---|---|---|
| New Democrat | Fred Young | 13,235 | 53.4 |
| Liberal | Paul Uguccioni | 6,133 | 24.7 |
| Progressive Conservative | George Gemmell | 3,982 | 16.1 |
| Independent | Dorlene Hewitt | 485 | 2.0 |
| Libertarian | Hersh Gelman | 479 | 1.9 |
| Communist | R.Moretton | 356 | 1.4 |
| Independent | Helen Obadia | 118 | 0.5 |
| | Total | 24,788 | |

1981 Ontario general election
| Party | Candidate | Votes | Vote % |
|---|---|---|---|
| Liberal | Michael Spensieri | 10,135 | 39.1 |
| New Democrat | Mike Morrone | 8,921 | 34.4 |
| Progressive Conservative | Brian Yandell | 5,273 | 30.4 |
| Independent | Frank Esposito | 831 | 3.2 |
| Independent | R. Brandenburg | 336 | 1.3 |
| Communist | Jack Sweet | 242 | 0.9 |
| Independent | Victor Heyn | 196 | 0.8 |
| | Total | 25,934 | |

1985 Ontario general election
| Party | Candidate | Votes | Vote % |
|---|---|---|---|
| Liberal | Claudio Polsinelli | 15,959 | 49.7 |
| New Democrat | Mike Foster | 12,651 | 39.4 |
| Progressive Conservative | Leslie Soobrian | 3,514 | 10.9 |
| | Total | 32,124 | |

1987 Ontario general election
| Party | Candidate | Votes | Vote % |
|---|---|---|---|
| Liberal | Claudio Polsinelli | 11,378 | 50.9 |
| New Democrat | Sheila Lambrinos | 6,185 | 27.7 |
| Independent Liberal | Tony Marzilli | 2,470 | 11.1 |
| Progressive Conservative | Fareed Khan | 1,639 | 7.3 |
| Libertarian | Russ Jackman | 674 | 3.0 |
| | Total | 22,346 | |

1990 Ontario general election
| Party | Candidate | Votes | Vote % |
|---|---|---|---|
| New Democrat | George Mammoliti | 9,944 | 49.5 |
| Liberal | Claudio Polsinelli | 8,320 | 41.5 |
| Progressive Conservative | Pedro Cordoba | 1,249 | 6.2 |
| Libertarian | Roma Kelembet | 325 | 1.6 |
| Independent | Lucylle Boikoff | 233 | 1.2 |
| | Total | 20,071 | |

1995 Ontario general election
| Party | Candidate | Votes | Vote % |
|---|---|---|---|
| Liberal | Mario Sergio | 9,245 | 47.0 |
| New Democrat | George Mammoliti | 6,447 | 32.8 |
| Progressive Conservative | Danny Varaich | 3,989 | 20.3 |
| Total | | 19681 | |
| Rejected, unmarked and declined ballots | | 320 | |
| Turnout | | 20,021 | 60.8 |
| Electors on list | | 32,827 | |

== See also ==
- List of Ontario provincial electoral districts
- Canadian provincial electoral districts
