= Donald C. MacDonald =

Canadian politician

Donald C. MacDonald CM OOnt
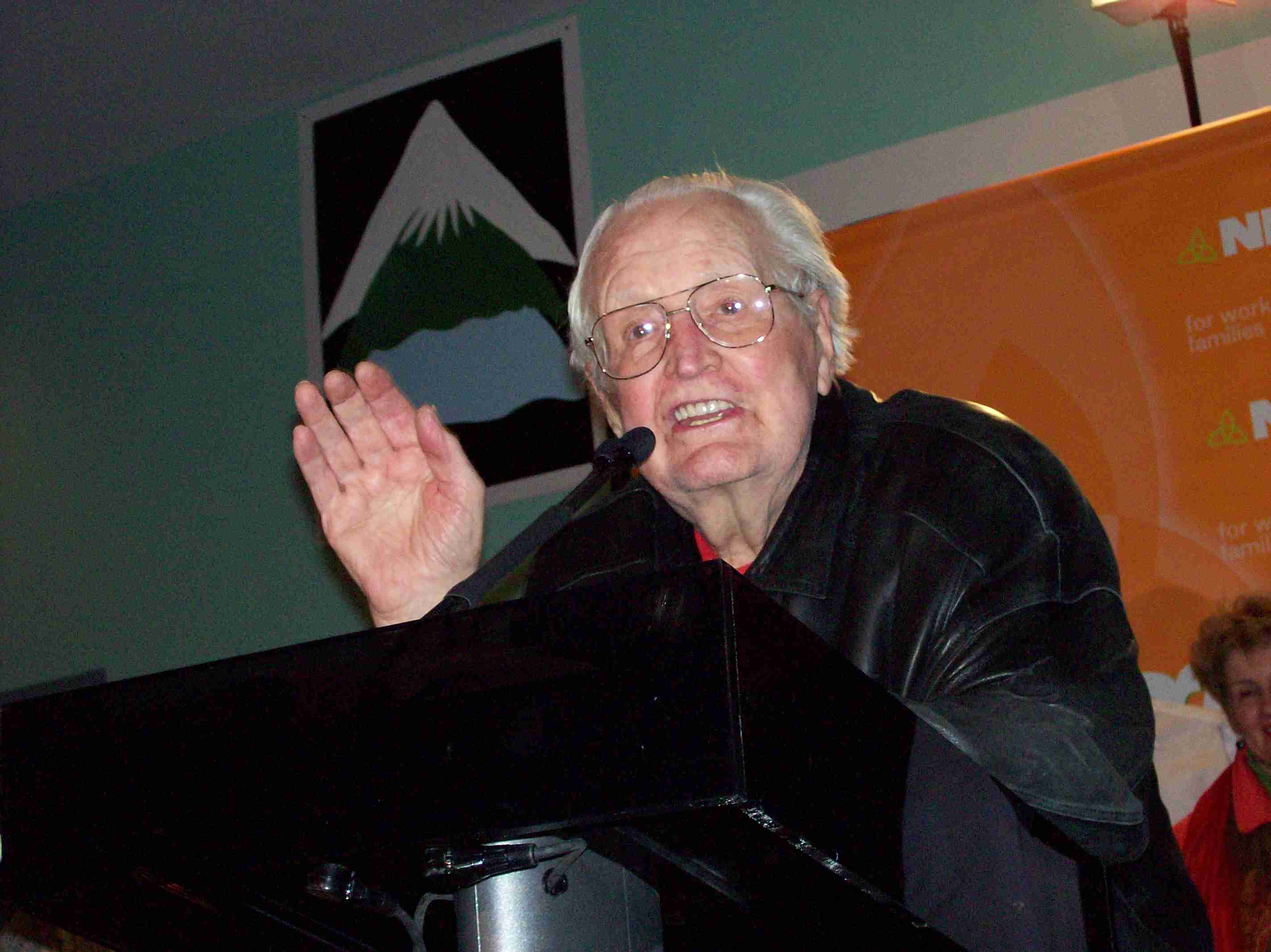
- MacDonald at Paul Ferreira's York South—Weston victory party, February 8, 2007

Leader of the Ontario CCF and NDP
- In office 1953–1970
- Preceded by: Ted Jolliffe
- Succeeded by: Stephen Lewis

President of the New Democratic Party of Canada
- In office 1971–1975
- Preceded by: Allan Blakeney
- Succeeded by: Joyce Nash

Member of Provincial Parliament
- In office June 9, 1955 – November 4, 1982
- Preceded by: William Beech (Progressive Conservative)
- Succeeded by: Bob Rae (NDP)
- Constituency: York South

Personal details
- Born: Donald Cameron MacDonald; December 7, 1913 Cranbrook, British Columbia, Canada
- Died: March 8, 2008 (aged 94) Toronto, Ontario, Canada
- Party: Co-operative Commonwealth Federation/New Democratic
- Spouse: Simone MacDonald
- Children: 3
- Occupation: Teacher and Journalist

Military service
- Allegiance: Canada
- Branch/service: Royal Canadian Navy
- Years of service: 1942–1945
- Battles/wars: Battle of the Atlantic

Donald Cameron MacDonald CM OOnt (December 7, 1913 – March 8, 2008) was a Canadian politician. Referred to in the media as the "best premier Ontario never had," he represented the provincial electoral district of York South in the Legislative Assembly of Ontario from 1955 to 1982. From 1953 to 1970 he was the leader of the social democratic Ontario section of the Co-operative Commonwealth Federation and its successor, the Ontario New Democratic Party.

== Early life and career ==
MacDonald was born in Cranbrook, British Columbia, and moved with his family to Tullochgorum, Quebec in 1923 and then earned a bachelor's and master's degree from Queen's University. He supported the Conservative Party of Canada in his youth, but became a democratic socialist after witnessing the social problems of the Great Depression. He worked for several years as a teacher and journalist, and was employed by the Montreal Gazette in the mid-1930s.

== Armed forces service ==
MacDonald joined the Royal Canadian Navy in 1942, and served in Canada during World War II as secretary of a top-secret intelligence committee, the main responsibility of which was to transmit enemy submarine positions to the Royal Canadian Air Force. He later became editor of Canadian Digest, a magazine published by the military that provided a cross section of articles from Canadian periodicals and newspapers, and was the host of Serviceman's Forum, a regular series of broadcasts on the Canadian Broadcasting Corporation that were also aired by the British Broadcasting Corporation. Members of the military and civilian experts discussed issues of concern in these broadcasts.

== Political life ==
=== CCF involvement ===
MacDonald joined the Co-operative Commonwealth Federation (CCF) while serving in Ottawa, Ontario in 1942. In 1946, he joined the national CCF staff and travelled the country as a party organizer. He was a candidate in the August 1953 federal election for the British Columbia riding of Kootenay East, and finished a strong third against Liberal Jim Byrne with 28% of the vote. He was persuaded to run in the Ontario CCF leadership convention later in the same year, and defeated Fred Young and Andrew Brewin for the position.

=== Leading the party ===
MacDonald took over the party in the middle of the Cold War and at the height of McCarthyism, when socialism was viewed with suspicion. The CCF had almost won power in Ontario ten years earlier, winning 34 seats in the 1943 provincial election, but by the time MacDonald became leader it held only two seats in the legislature. MacDonald was himself without a seat until the 1955 provincial election, when he defeated Progressive Conservative incumbent William Beech by 1,426 votes in York South. His victory increased the CCF's legislative standing to three seats, and MacDonald quickly became known as one of the most vocal members of the legislature. He fought for issues such as prison reform and universal public healthcare, and emphasised pragmatism over doctrinaire socialism as he tried to appeal to voters as a moderate reformer. Some Toronto newspapers described him as the de facto opposition leader against Leslie Frost's Progressive Conservative government. His pursuit of the Northern Ontario Natural Gas scandal led to the resignation of three members of Frost's cabinet.

MacDonald slowly rebuilt the party during his tenure as leader, and provided it with a benevolent public face. The CCF grew to five seats in the 1959 provincial election. Following the founding of the federal New Democratic Party in 1961, he was acclaimed as the first leader of the Ontario NDP at the provincial party's October 1961 founding convention. The new party won seven seats in the 1963 election, and MacDonald later expressed disappointment that a larger breakthrough did not occur.

As the province's population became more urban and as social issues came to the forefront of political discussion, the NDP had a major breakthrough in the 1967 election rising from seven seats to 20. This new success led to increasing pressure for new leadership, as the party was seen as a potential victor and many activists felt a younger leader was needed to catch the mood of the times. Jim Renwick challenged MacDonald for the party leadership in 1968, but lost. In 1970, Stephen Lewis was able to marshall support among the Steelworkers union with which his family had strong links. (His father, David Lewis, had represented the steelworkers as a labour lawyer for many years.) MacDonald decided not to seek re-election as leader in order to avoid a divisive fight. At the leadership convention that fall, Stephen Lewis defeated Walter Pitman and succeeded MacDonald as Ontario NDP leader.

=== 1970 stepping away from leadership ===
MacDonald was officially neutral in the 1970 leadership contest, but tacitly favoured Pitman. In his autobiography, MacDonald notes that he was initially skeptical about the younger Lewis's leadership abilities, and believed that his election "fitted conveniently into the Tory plans" for the next election. The Progressive Conservative government was able to rally business support by depicting Lewis as dangerously left-wing, and the NDP did not gain seats in the 1971 election. MacDonald has also argued that the party's breakthrough under Lewis in the 1975 election was made possible by Lewis's decision to moderate his more strident views.

At the federal level, MacDonald attended the 1971 NDP Federal Leadership Convention and ran for party president. The 1960s youth-quake was moving into federal politics, and a group of New Left academics and activists called The Waffle presented the fiercest opposition to MacDonald and other "establishment" members. He was up against Carol Gudmundson — of the Saskatoon, Saskatchewan Waffle — in the battle for the party presidency. With the help of the union delegations, and the party's establishment, MacDonald was victorious on April 23, 1971 and became the president during the same convention that saw Tommy Douglas pass the leadership torch on to David Lewis. He got 885 votes to Gudmundson's 565, and started the trend that day that saw Waffle candidates getting defeated at almost every federal council and executive position.

=== Retiring from York South and beyond ===
MacDonald supported Ian Deans's unsuccessful bid to replace Lewis as party leader in 1978, and helped to draft Bob Rae for the leadership in 1982. He then resigned as an MPP in 1982, to give Rae an opportunity to enter the legislature. MacDonald served as chair of the NDP caucus from 1982 to 1985, and was chair of the Ontario Election Finances Commission from 1986 to 1994.

MacDonald's autobiography, Happy Warrior: Political Memoirs, was published in 1988 and the second edition in 1998, to add the Rae years as the first NDP Ontario government.

He became a Member of the Order of Canada in 2003 and also holds an Order of Ontario.

=== Paul Ferreira ===
By the early 2000s, the NDP was near the bottom of their decline in MacDonald's home riding. Rae had held the riding for 14 years before it fell to the Liberals in 1996. The riding's name was changed to York South—Weston for the 1999 provincial election and it became a much larger riding than it was when he represented it.

In 2004, MacDonald supported a young NDP Provincial Executive member named Paul Ferreira in his campaign to be the area's MPP. Ferreira would raise the NDP's vote substantially from 3.7% to over 21%. While not good enough for a win, it allowed him to eventually, after four elections in two and half years, win the seat February 8, 2007. Donald MacDonald supported him through all these campaigns and was there to publicly congratulate Ferreira and pass on the generational torch at the victory party.

== Death ==
MacDonald died in 2008 of heart failure at Mount Sinai Hospital in Toronto. He was 94.
