= Michelangelo Spensieri =

Canadian politician

Michael Spensieri

Ontario MPP
- In office 1981–1985
- Preceded by: Fred Young
- Succeeded by: Claudio Polsinelli
- Constituency: Yorkview

Personal details
- Born: January 2, 1949 Molise, Italy
- Died: May 6, 2013 (aged 64)
- Party: Ontario Liberal Party
- Occupation: Lawyer

Michelangelo 'Michael' Spensieri (January 2, 1949 – May 6, 2013) was an Italian-Canadian politician and lawyer in Ontario. He served in the Legislative Assembly of Ontario from 1981 to 1985, as a member of the Ontario Liberal Party.

== Background ==
Spensieri moved to Canada at the age of 13 from the town of Vinchiaturo near Campobasso in the Italian region of Molise. He was educated at the University of Toronto, receiving a Juris Doctor J.D. degree in 1972, and Osgoode Hall Law School, York University, where he was awarded the Master of Laws degree in 1992 specializing in International Business, Trade & Tax Laws. He practiced law in Toronto until October 26, 1989.

== Politics ==
Spensieri ran for the Ontario legislature in the 1975 provincial election but lost to New Democratic Party candidate Odoardo Di Santo in Downsview by sixty-eight votes. He was elected in the 1981 election, defeating NDP candidate Mike Morrone by 1,187 votes in Yorkview.

Spensieri supported David Peterson for the Liberal Party leadership in 1982. In late 1984, he was forced to issue an apology after sending out a newsletter which portrayed the New Democratic Party as "a group of socialists committed to the destruction of the separate school system and the murder of unborn children". He served one term in the legislature, and was not a candidate for re-election in 1985. He sought the Liberal nomination in Downsview for the 1987 election, but lost to Laureano Leone.

== After politics ==
Spensieri returned to his law practice after leaving the legislature but sought permission to resign from the Law Society of Upper Canada in 1989, after losing count of two million dollars' worth of unclaimed moneys. Spensieri cited a manic-depressive bipolar illness as his defense before convocation, and was granted leave to resign for his own well-being. After this, he wrote a number of letters to Toronto newspapers describing prominent Italian-Canadian figures in the Liberal Party as cultural misfits. In 1998, he wrote that "voters of Italian heritage ... have erred too often and too long by electing mostly Liberals".

In 1999, the socially conservative Family Coalition Party announced that Spensieri would be its candidate in York Centre for the 1999 provincial election. Due to persistent cardiovascular health concerns, however, he was unable to participate. Spensieri retired from public life and promoted activities and fundraising in the areas of mental health and bipolar disorders.

Spensieri died on May 6, 2013. He was 64.
