= Co-operative Commonwealth Federation (Ontario Section) =

- Leader: Ted Jolliffe, Donald C. MacDonald
- President: Agnes Macphail (chairman), John Mitchell, Samuel Lawrence, Charles Millard, Samuel Lawrence, G.M.A. Grube, Andrew Brewin, Miller Stewart, Theodore Isley
- Founded: 1932
- Dissolved: 8 October 1961
- Preceded by: United Farmers of Ontario, Independent Labour Party
- Succeeded by: Ontario NDP
- Headquarters: Toronto, Ontario
- Ideology: Social democracy Democratic socialism Agrarianism
- Political position: Left-wing
- National affiliation: CCF
- Colours: Green and yellow

The Co-operative Commonwealth Federation (Ontario Section) – The Farmer–Labor Party of Ontario, more commonly known as the Ontario CCF, was a democratic socialist provincial political party in Ontario that existed from 1932 to 1961. It was the provincial wing of the federal Co-operative Commonwealth Federation (CCF). The party had no leader in the beginning, and was governed by a provincial council and executive. The party's first Member of the Legislative Assembly (MLA) was elected by voters in the 1934 Ontario general election. In the 1937 general election, no CCF members were elected to the Ontario Legislature. In 1942, the party elected Toronto lawyer Ted Jolliffe as its first leader. He led the party to within a few seats of forming the government in the 1943 general election; instead, it formed the Official Opposition. In that election, the first two women were elected to the Ontario Legislature as CCFers: Agnes Macphail and Rae Luckock. The 1945 election was a setback, as the party lost most of its seats in the Legislature, including Jolliffe's seat. The party again became the Official Opposition after the 1948 general election, and defeated the Conservative premier George Drew in his seat, when Bill Temple unexpectedly won in the High Park constituency. The middle and late 1940s were the peak years for the Ontario CCF. After that time, its electoral performances were dismal, as it was reduced to a rump of two seats in the 1951 election, three seats in the 1955 election, and five seats in the 1959 election. Jolliffe stepped down as leader in 1953, and was replaced by Donald C. MacDonald.

The period between the 1951 defeat and the founding of the Ontario New Democratic Party was one of much internal strife; nonetheless, MacDonald managed to keep the party together, despite the constant electoral defeats. In October 1961, the party dissolved itself and became part of the New Democratic Party.

== History ==
=== Origins ===
The Ontario CCF was indirectly the successor to the 1919–23 United Farmers of Ontario–Labour coalition that formed the government in Ontario under Ernest C. Drury. While in 1934 several former United Farmer Members of the Legislative Assembly (MLAs) became Liberal-Progressives aligned with the Ontario Liberal Party, the United Farmers of Ontario (UFO), as an organization, participated in the formation of the Ontario CCF, and was briefly affiliated with the party.

After a meeting in Ottawa on May 26, 1932, that brought together all the Members of Parliament that belonged to the Ginger Group, and some members of the League for Social Reconstruction (LSR), the CCF was formed, making J. S. Woodsworth the de facto leader, and giving responsibility for organizing Ontario to Agnes Macphail of the UFO. Macphail, as president of the Ontario Provincial Council, persuaded her fellow delegates at the December 1932 UFO convention to affiliate with the CCF provincial council. After the 1933 Regina convention, the name of the party was introduced as the Co-operative Commonwealth Federation (Ontario Section) – The Farmer–Labor Party, though the shorter Ontario CCF was the most commonly used name.

Macphail served as the first chairman of the Ontario CCF from 1932 until 1934. As a UFO Member of Parliament (MP) in the Canadian House of Commons, she was forced to resign from the CCF after the UFO withdrew from the party after alleging communist influence in it. Consequently, the UFO's two candidates in the 1934 provincial election, longtime incumbent MLA Farquhar Oliver (Grey South) and former MLA Leslie Warner Oke (Lambton East) under the UFO banner rather than with the CCF (though Oke was also endorsed by the CCF). Oliver was elected and would caucus with the Liberals before joining the party several years later. Macphail later served in the Legislative Assembly of Ontario as the CCF Member of Provincial Parliament (MPP) (Note: In 1938, Members of the Ontario Legislative Assembly (MLAs) passed a motion to adopt the title "Members of Provincial Parliament" (MPP).) for York East from 1943 to 1945 and again from 1948 to 1951.

Samuel Lawrence, an Independent Labour Party member of Hamilton City Council, was elected to the Ontario legislature as a CCF MPP in the 1934 provincial election, the first Ontario election contested by the CCF. The party received 7.1 percent of the vote and, with Lawrence's election in Hamilton East, won its first seat in the Ontario Legislature. The Ontario CCF failed to win any seats in the 1937 election. He was elected Ontario CCF president in 1941. and served as Mayor of Hamilton from 1944 to 1949 leading a CCF slate in that city.

Alderman John Mitchell of Hamilton was elected the first Ontario CCF president in 1934 as part of a reorganization of the party after its provincial council had been suspended by federal leader J. S. Woodsworth for suspected communist infiltration. The reorganization created a new provincial council and central party executive and centralized what had been a loose structure of affiliate organizations and riding clubs. It was accompanied by a purge of party clubs and affiliates suspected of having been infiltrated by Communists and the removal of suspected Communists from senior party positions. The reorganization was prompted by complaints of Communist infiltration, due to the party's previously loose structure. In reaction to alleged Communist involvement, the United Farmers of Ontario disaffiliated from the CCF. Mitchell unofficially led the Ontario CCF during the 1934 Ontario general election and conducted a province-wide tour during the 1937 election campaign but failed to win a seat in the Legislature. He continued as party president until 1941.

Graham Spry, a publisher and broadcaster who was also a member of the LSR, served as the Ontario CCF's vice-president of its provincial council from 1934 to 1936. He was the first federal CCF candidate in Ontario, running in the September 24, 1934 by-election in Toronto East. Other prominent members were Elmore Philpott, a former Liberal. Philpott joined the CCF in 1933 and became president of the Ontario Association of CCF Clubs but resigned in March 1934 over the A. E. Smith affair that had caused the UFO to leave as well. Philpott rejoined the Liberal Party in 1935. The disagreement was in regards to how much support the fledgling CCF should give Smith, leader of the Canadian Labour Defence League, who had been charged with sedition for claiming that the state had attempted to assassinate imprisoned Communist Party of Canada leader Tim Buck. The CLDC was a communist front group. Woodsworth, and the Ontario CCF provincial council, opposed the CCF having any formal links with it or any other communist group. Some individual CCFers ignored this policy as did one section of the Ontario CCF, which was expelled. Nevertheless, Philpott and the UFO saw the Smith affair as evidence that the CCF had been infiltrated by Communists and left. The issue of what relationship the CCF should have with the Communist Party came to the fore again in 1936 when the party voted to ban any united front with Communists, over the objections of prominent CCFers such as East York reeve Arthur Henry Williams.

=== Electoral breakthrough ===
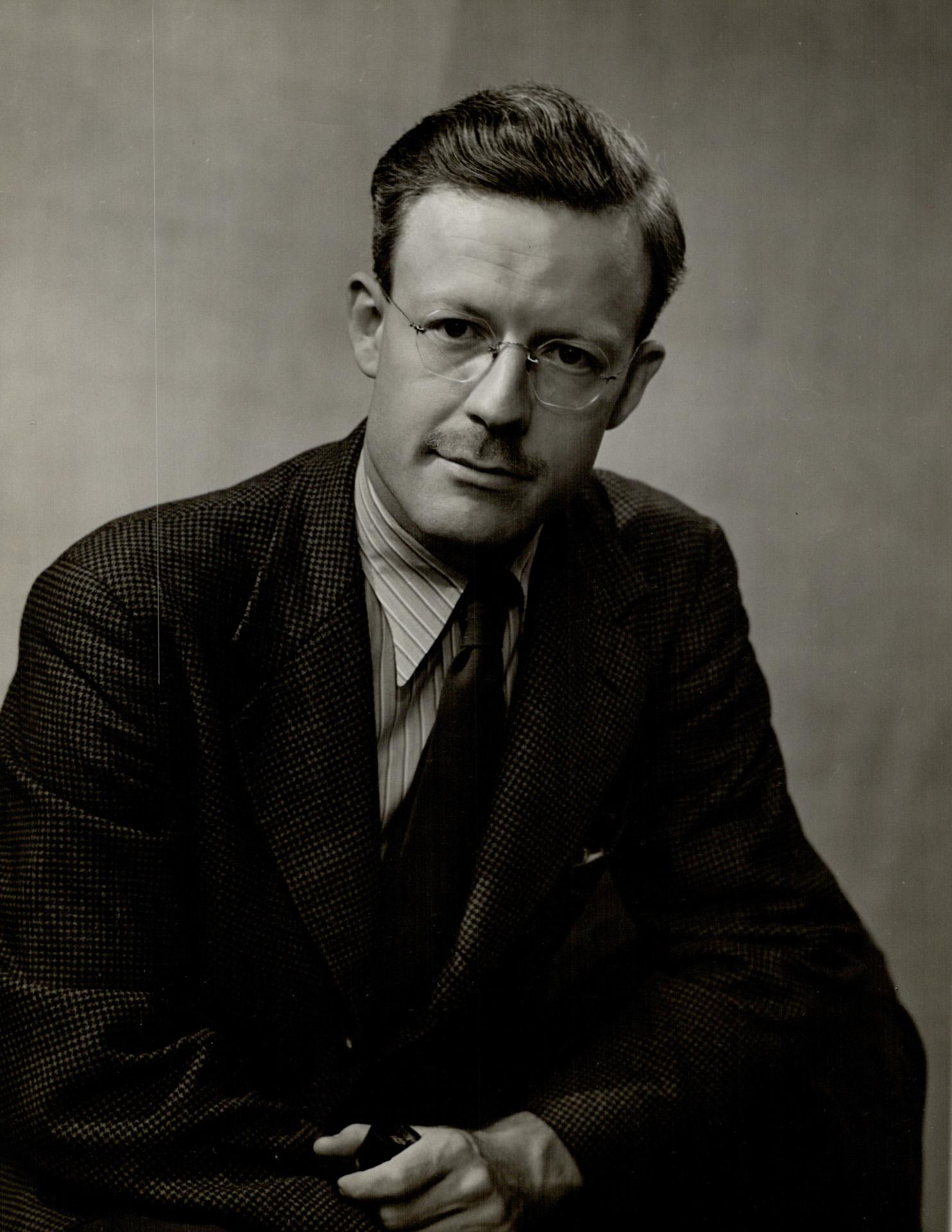
Ted Jolliffe, CCF Leader 1942–1953

At the Ontario CCF's tenth annual convention in Toronto, the first leadership election was held. Two candidates came forward: Toronto lawyer and Ontario CCF vice-president Ted Jolliffe, and union activist and former Ontario CCF Youth Movement organizer Murray Cotterill. On April 4, 1942, Jolliffe won the election, but the voting results were not announced. The newly created Leader position's role was political and legislative, while internal CCF affairs and administration would remain the president's domain.

The party achieved a major breakthrough under Jolliffe, in the 1943 general election, when it formed the Official Opposition with 32 percent of the vote and 34 seats. The CCF was just four seats short of George Drew's Progressive Conservatives ("Tories"), who formed a minority government that was the beginning of what became a 42-year political dynasty.

=== 1945 "Gestapo" campaign ===
In the 1945 election, Premier Drew ran an anti-Semitic, union bashing, Red-baiting campaign. The previous two years of anti-socialist attacks by the Conservatives and their supporters, like Gladstone Murray and Montague A. Sanderson, were devastatingly effective against the previously popular CCF. Much of the source material for the anti-CCF campaign came from the Ontario Provincial Police (OPP)'s Special Investigation Branch's agent D-208: Captain William J. Osbourne-Dempster. His office was supposed to be investigating war-time 5th column saboteurs. Instead, starting in November 1943, he was investigating, almost exclusively, Ontario opposition MPPs, mainly focusing on the CCF caucus. The fact that Jolliffe knew about these 'secret' investigations as early as February 1944 led to one of the most infamous incidents in 20th-century Canadian politics.

==== May 24, 1945 radio speech ====
The 1945 campaign was anything but genteel and polite. Jolliffe replied by giving a radio speech – written with the assistance of Lister Sinclair – that accused Drew of running a political Gestapo in Ontario. In the speech excerpt below, Jolliffe alleged that a secret department of the Ontario Provincial Police was acting as a political police – spying on the opposition and the media.

It is my duty to tell you that Colonel Drew is maintaining in Ontario, at this very minute, a secret political police, a paid government spy organization, a Gestapo to try and keep himself in power. And Col[onel] Drew maintains his secret political police at the expense of the taxpayers of Ontario – paid out of the Public Funds....

Jolliffe's inflammatory speech became the main issue of the campaign, and dominated coverage in the media for the rest of the election. Drew, and his Attorney-General Leslie Blackwell vehemently denied Jolliffe's accusations, but the public outcry was too much for them to abate. On May 26, 1945, during his own radio speech, Drew announced that he would be appointing a Royal Commission to investigate these charges. Jolliffe's CCF and Mitchell Hepburn's Ontario Liberal Party wanted the election suspended until the commission tabled its report. Hepburn sent Drew a personal telegram stating he would stop campaigning if the commission were held immediately. Drew ignored these requests and continued to hold the election on its original date, despite it being many months before the commission's findings would be made available.

=== Election Day, June 4, 1945 ===
Jolliffe's CCF went from 34 seats to 8, but almost garnered the same number of votes cast, though their percentage of the popular vote dropped from 32 to 22 percent. A Gallup poll done a month earlier showed the CCF at essentially the same percentage, making it questionable whether or not the "Gestapo" speech had an effect on the campaign. Drew, with his attack campaign, successfully drove the voter turn-out up, thereby driving the CCF's percentage and seat totals down.

Nineteen forty-five was one of Ontario's most important elections in the 20th century, according to Caplan and David Lewis. It shaped the province for the next 40 years, as the Conservatives won a massive majority in the Legislature, and would remain in government for the next 40 consecutive years–most of that time with majority governments until the mid-1970s.

For Jolliffe, another election consequence was his tenure as the MPP from York South ended, at least for the time-being. He lost the election but did better than any other CCF candidate in Toronto or in the outlying Yorks.

=== LeBel Royal Commission ===
On May 28, Drew appointed Justice A.M. LeBel as the Royal Commissioner, thereby forming what has become known as the LeBel Royal Commission. His terms of reference were restricted to the question of whether Drew was personally responsible for the establishment of "a secret political police organization, for the purpose of collecting, by secret spying, material to be used in attempt to keep him in power." Wider questions like why the OPP, Ontario civil servants, were keeping files on MPPs were not allowed.

Jolliffe acted as his own counsel throughout the commission, but was assisted by fellow CCF lawyer, Andrew Brewin. He and Brewin were able to establish, from several eyewitnesses, that agent D-208, Dempster, was spying on the CCF. What they could not prove, because they did not have access to the information in 1945, were the letters that Drew wrote to his supporter M.A. (Bugsy) Sanderson suggesting that he would finance any lawsuits or other charges stemming from the information provided by Dempster in his advertisements. Sanderson was, in late 1943 to 1945, along with Gladstone Murray, leading the libellous advertisement campaigns against the CCF in newspapers and billboards, with information gleaned from Dempster's briefings. Jolliffe presented several witnesses that claimed to have seen these documents. But Jolliffe could not produce the letter, and Drew denied ever writing it.

On October 11, 1945, Justice LeBel issued his report that essentially exonerated Drew and Blackwell. Because Jolliffe presented only circumstantial evidence that linked Drew to Dempster, Murray and Sanderson, the Commissioner found the information unconvincing, even though LeBel believed Dempster's interaction with Sanderson and Murray was inappropriate.

Jolliffe's motives regarding his accusations, and his choice of words, were questioned for many years afterwards. In the late 1970s, when David Lewis was doing research for his Memoirs, he came across archival evidence proving the charge. Because of Lewis's discovery, Drew's son Edward, placed extremely restrictive conditions on his father's papers housed in the Public Archives of Canada. (Note: When Edward Drew (George's son) dies, these archives will become unrestricted.)

As Lewis pointed out in his memoirs, "We found that Premier Drew and Gladstone Murray did not disclose all information to the Lebel Commission; indeed, they deliberately prevaricated throughout. The head of the Government of Ontario had given false witness under testimony.... The perpetrator of Ontario's Watergate got away with it."

=== 1945 election aftermath ===
After the LeBel Report was published, the Ontario CCF still had to go on with the business of running the party, and hold its annual convention. It had been over 18 months since the previous provincial convention was held. The convention was held from Thursday, November 22, to Saturday, November 24 at the Toronto Labor Lyceum on Spadina Avenue. Jolliffe made it publicly known before the convention that he intended to continue as leader. He ran despite the elements within the party that blamed him for the election defeat. His critics charged that the CCF did not stress policy enough during the election; that the party's platform was too vague, too leader-based, and was too reliant on slogans. Jolliffe was attacked for how he handled the last weeks of the campaign, especially over the "Gestapo" speech. These critics also blamed labour's involvement in dumbing-down the campaign, which was seen as the trade unions doing anything to achieve power. It got so bad, that a motion to expel Jolliffe, and David Lewis over these perceived grievances made it on to the convention floor. The motion read, "the campaign tactics of the 1945 election had been decided by Mr. Jolliffe with the advice of Mr. Lewis and the democratic processes within the CCF had been ignored." It was defeated, but it also demonstrated that the party's establishment had angered its socialist militant base.

On Saturday afternoon, after the grievances were aired, the convention unanimously passed a resolution condemning Premier Drew asking him to stop spying on labour and political officials. After that, the party's establishment candidates held on to their positions: University of Toronto professor, George Grube remained as president, while Jolliffe remained leader.

In 1946, there was major labour strife in Ontario, and the CCF made it clear they were on the side of the unionists. The party's annual convention was held outside of Toronto for the first time. The convention was held at the Royal Connaught Hotel in Hamilton, Ontario from December 9–11, 1946, the city where the United Steelworkers of America (USWA) went through a long protracted strike about reducing the work-week to 40 hours. Jolliffe faced a leadership challenge at this convention from former Toronto Controller Lewis Duncan. There were rumblings in 1945 that Duncan would take over from Jolliffe, but that was rumoured to be only if he were able to defeat Drew in the High Park constituency, which he failed to do. As party chairman John Mitchell stated at the time, it wasn't even close, as Jolliffe was easily re-elected CCF leader again for the fourth time. Professor Grube stepped down as the president, and Andrew Brewin succeeded him after defeating former York South MP, Joseph W. Noseworthy by four votes. The main resolution that would affect the upcoming provincial election was one that condemned Drew's government for its hastily approved legislation allowing for cocktail bars to operate in Ontario.

=== 1948 Ontario general election ===
Though the 1948 election came about a year sooner than normal, the Ontario CCF had been expecting this because of the polling information available that indicated that Drew's popularity was falling. The CCF were able to rebound from their previous dismal election performance in 1945, and this time managed to get 21 members elected, including Jolliffe in York South, to again form the Official Opposition.

The real surprise was that Premier Drew lost his seat, even though his Progressive Conservatives won a majority. In his High Park constituency, Drew was up against his local nemesis William (Bill) Temple. Temple was a temperance campaigner and made Drew's cocktail bar legislation the main campaign issue. Temple castigated Drew for softening Ontario's liquor laws, claiming the Premier was the captive of "liquor interests" because of the government's decision to allow liquor sales in cocktail bars. While Drew's party swept to victory across the province, Drew was defeated by Temple, and decided to resign as premier and move to federal politics.

=== 1951 election disaster and its aftermath ===
The CCF's return to popularity was short-lived because of the prosperity of the 1950s and the anti-Communist hysteria of the Cold War. This rapid decline in their popularity reduced the party to two seats in the 1951 election and allowed the Ontario Liberal Party to become the Official Opposition. No social democratic party would be the Official Opposition again until 1975, when Stephen Lewis's NDP displaced the Liberals as the second party in the Legislative Assembly of Ontario.

Beginning with the 1951 provincial campaign, the Ontario Federation of Labour (OFL) played an increased role in the Ontario CCF by lending it organizational, personnel and material support. The increasing role of the trade union leadership in the party was unpopular with some activists like MPP Bill Temple. The "Ginger Group" led by Temple, True Davidson and others was formed in the wake of the disastrous 1951 electoral result which they blamed on the "bureaucratization" of the party and its movement away from socialist principles and particularly socialist education, developments for which they held what they saw as the conservative, anti-democratic and bureaucratic influence of the OFL as responsible. At the party's 1952 convention, Temple ran for party leader but withdrew at the last moment, allowing Jolliffe to be acclaimed leader. Temple did not stop from making trouble for the establishment, when he ran for party president, and almost won. He and Davidson were elected to the party executive as vice-presidents and the Ginger Group elected a number of its followers to the provincial council. They were unsuccessful in achieving their goals, however. The increasing role of the OFL in the Ontario CCF proved to be a precursor to the eventual fusion of the national CCF and the trade union movement with the creation of the New Democratic Party of Canada at the federal and provincial levels in 1961.

=== End of the CCF/New Party and revival ===
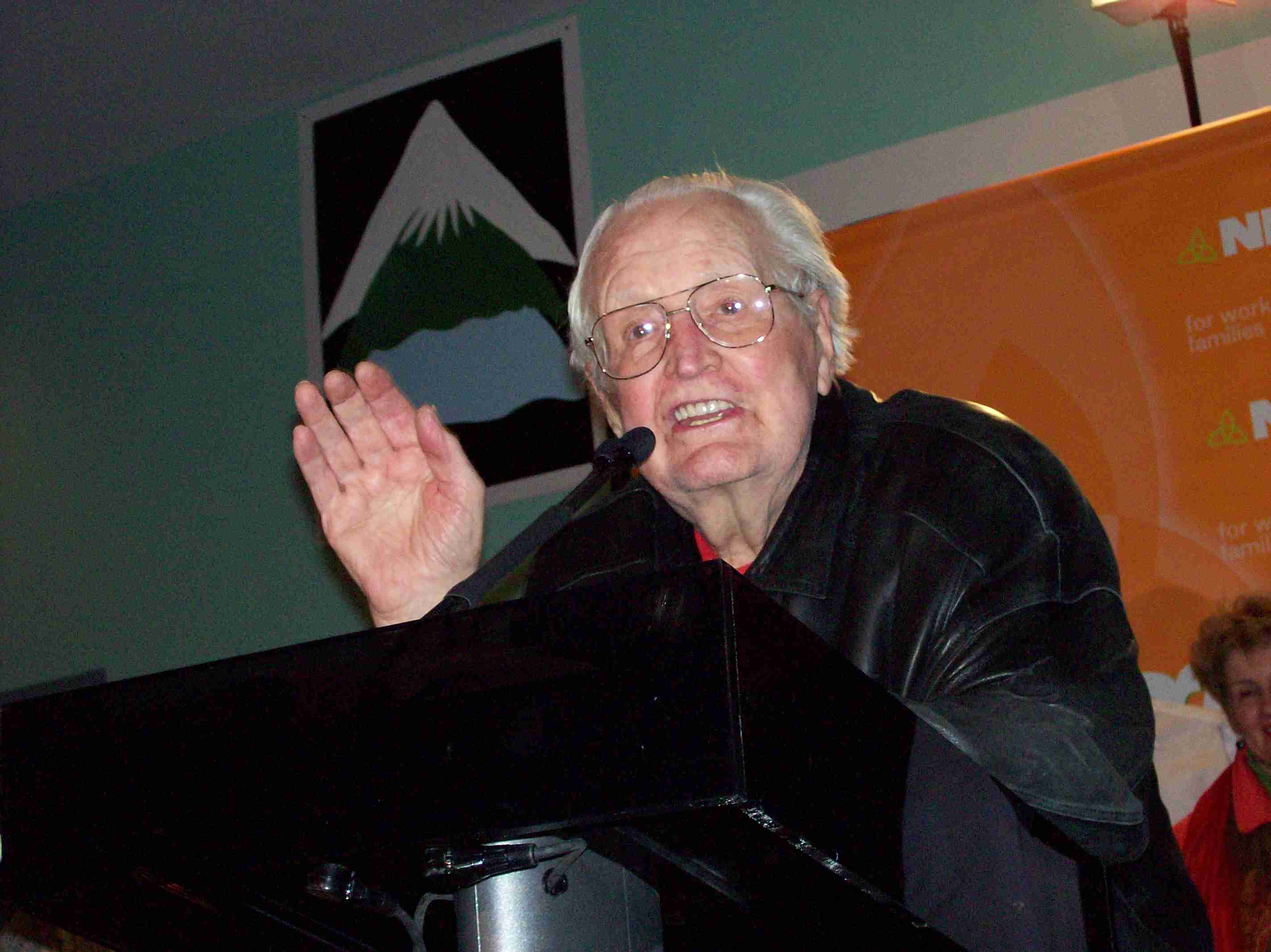
Donald C. MacDonald, CCF/NDP Leader from 1953 to 1970. Seen here in February 2007

Donald C. MacDonald was elected leader at the 1953 leadership convention. and spent the next years rebuilding the party, from two seats when he took over the party's helm, to three in his first election and then five in 1959. Delegates from the Ontario CCF, delegates from affiliated union locals, and delegates from New Party Clubs took part in the founding convention of the New Democratic Party of Ontario held in Niagara Falls at the Sheraton Brock Hotel from 7–9 October 1961 and elected MacDonald as their leader. The Ontario CCF Council ceased to exist on Sunday, 8 October 1961, when the newly elected NDP executive officially took over. The rebuilding process continued under Macdonald who led a 20-person caucus by the time he stepped down in 1970.

== Election results ==
Election	Leader	Seats	Change +/-	Votes	Percentage	Standing	Legislative role	Government
1934	John Mitchell (party president)	1 / 90	▲1	n.a.	7.0%	▲3rd	Third party	Liberal majority
1937	John Mitchell (party president)	0 / 90	▼1	n.a.	5.6%	▼ none	None	Liberal majority
1943	Ted Jolliffe	34 / 90	▲34	n.a.	31.7%	▲2nd	Opposition	Progressive Conservative minority
1945	Ted Jolliffe	8 / 90	▼26	n.a.	22.4%	▼3rd	Third party	Progressive Conservative majority
1948	Ted Jolliffe	21 / 90	▲13	n.a.	27.0%	▲2nd	Opposition	Progressive Conservative majority
1951	Ted Jolliffe	2 / 90	▼19	n.a.	19.1%	▼3rd	Third party	Progressive Conservative majority
1955	Donald C. MacDonald	3 / 98	▲1	n.a.	16.5%	3rd	Third party	Progressive Conservative majority
1959	Donald C. MacDonald	5 / 98	▲2	n.a.	16.7%	3rd	Third party	Progressive Conservative majority

== Leaders ==
There was no party leader prior to 1942. From 1932 to 1934 Agnes Macphail, as chair of the Ontario CCF provincial council, was the main co-spokesperson. Her other co-spokesperson was Elmore Philpott – from 1933 to 1934 – as president of the Ontario Association of CCF Clubs. They were the most prominent figures in the Ontario party and acted as spokespersons until their March 1934 resignations.

From 1934 to 1942 the new position of Ontario CCF president was the party's effective leader.

Ontario CCF president John Mitchell, a Hamilton alderman, led the party's campaigns in the 1934 and 1937 Ontario elections.

From 1934 to 1937 Samuel Lawrence, MPP for Hamilton East led the party in the legislature as its sole MPP. Lawrence succeeded Mitchell as party president in 1941 and recommended that the party select a leader at its 1942 convention.

- 1942–1952 – Ted Jolliffe, MPP for York South (1943–1945, 1948–1951)
- 1953–1961 – Donald C. MacDonald, MPP for York South (1955–1982)

W. J. Grummett (Cochrane South) was House Leader of the CCF, leading the party in the Ontario Legislature from 1951, when Jolliffe lost his seat, until 1955, when MacDonald entered the legislature.

MacDonald became the first leader of the Ontario New Democratic Party when it was formed in 1961.

== See also ==
- List of articles about Ontario CCF/NDP members
- Ontario CCF/NDP leadership elections
- 1942 Ontario Co-operative Commonwealth Federation leadership election
- List of Ontario political parties
