= Mario Sergio (politician) =

Canadian politician

The Honourable Mario Sergio ECO

Ontario MPP
- In office 1995–2018
- Preceded by: George Mammoliti
- Succeeded by: Tom Rakocevic
- Constituency: York West; Yorkview (1995-1999)

North York City Councillor
- In office 1978–1995
- Constituency: Ward 1

Personal details
- Born: July 28, 1940 (age 85) Calabria, Italy
- Party: Liberal
- Occupation: Real estate broker
- Portfolio: Minister without portfolio (Seniors) (2013-2016)

Mario Sergio (born July 28, 1940) is a former politician in Ontario, Canada. He was a Liberal member of the Legislative Assembly of Ontario from 1995 to 2018 who represented the ridings of Yorkview and York West. He served in cabinet in the government of Kathleen Wynne as a Minister without Portfolio from 2013 to 2016.

== Background ==
Sergio attended technical school in Italy, and worked as a real estate broker after moving to Canada. He started his own general insurance business in 1961, and started a private real estate brokerage firm in 1968.

== Municipal politics ==
Sergio was first elected to the North York City Council in 1978, and remained in municipal politics until 1995 when he was elected to the Ontario legislature. He also served on the Metro Toronto Council from 1985 to 1988, and was a member of North York's Planning Board Committee for fourteen years.

== Provincial politics ==
In the provincial election of 1995, Sergio defeated incumbent New Democrat George Mammoliti in Yorkview by almost 3000 votes to win election to the legislature. The Progressive Conservatives won the election, and Sergio joined 29 other Liberals in the official opposition.

In the 1999 provincial election, Sergio was re-elected in the new riding of York West by more than 10,000 votes over his nearest opponent. He was subsequently appointed deputy whip and critic for small business.

The Liberals won the 2003 election, in which Sergio defeated his closest opponent by over 12,000 votes. While in government he has served as parliamentary assistant to a number of different portfolios including Minister of Consumer and Business Services (2003–2004), Minister responsible for seniors (2005–2007), and Minister for Municipal Affairs and Housing (2006-2010, 2011-2013). He was re-elected in 2007, 2011, and 2014.

In 2013, Sergio was appointed as a Minister without Portfolio with responsibility for Seniors. He left cabinet as part of a cabinet shuffle on June 13, 2016.

On July 13, 2017, Sergio announced that he would not seek re-election in the 42nd Ontario general election.
