= List of Italian Canadians =

This is a list of notable Italian Canadians who have been established in Canada. This list takes into account the entire Canadian population, which consists of Canadian citizens (by birth and by naturalization), landed immigrants and non-permanent residents and their families living with them in Canada as per the census.

== A ==
- Bob Abate (1893 – 1981) — sports coach
- Luca Accettola — soccer player
- Mike Accursi — lacrosse player
- Taylor Accursi — ice hockey player
- Tony Accurso — businessman
- Jeremy Adduono — ice hockey player
- Ray Adduono — ice hockey player
- Rick Adduono — ice hockey player
- Meghan Agosta — ice hockey player
- Lucio Agostini (1913 – 1996) — composer
- Dominic Agostino (1959 – 2004) — Ontario politician
- Andrew Agozzino — ice hockey player
- Laura Albanese — politician
- Carlo Alberti — soccer player
- Reno Alberton (1936 – 1996) — ice hockey player
- Valerio Alesi — soccer player
- Julian Altobelli — soccer player
- Dave Amadio — ice hockey player
- Greg Amadio — ice hockey player
- Michael Amadio — ice hockey player
- Norman Amadio — jazz pianist
- Debbie Amaroso — Ontario politician
- Pietro Amato — musician
- Stella Ambler — politician
- Domenic Amodeo — ice hockey player
- Mike Amodeo — ice hockey player
- Enza Anderson — journalist, media personality, Ontario politician
- Lou Angotti — ice hockey player
- Sandy Annunziata — football player
- Tom Anselmi — businessman
- William Anselmi — academic and writer
- James Anthony — musician
- Salvatore Antonio — actor and playwright
- Danny Antonucci — animator, director, producer, and writer
- Richard Appignanesi — writer and editor
- Francesco Aquilini — businessman
- Luciano Aquino — ice hockey player
- Francesco Arcadi — mobster
- Violet Archer — composer, teacher, pianist, organist, and percussionist
- Susie Arioli — jazz singer
- Robbie Aristodemo — soccer player
- Matthew Arnone — soccer player
- Anthony Aromatario — soccer player
- Tyler Attardo — soccer player
- Maria Augimeri — Toronto city councillor

== B ==
- Hubert Badanai (1895 – 1986) — politician
- Carlo Baldassarra — business man
- Tony Baldinelli — politician
- Dean Bandiera — former football player
- Misstress Barbara — singer
- Mark Barberio — ice hockey player
- Carmelo Barbieri — soccer player
- Robert Barbieri — professional rugby player
- Anthony Bardaro — ice hockey player
- Carmen Barillaro (1944 – 1997) — mobster
- Luigi Bartesaghi — cyclist
- Marisa Ferretti Barth — Senator
- Rick Bartolucci — Ontario politician
- David Baseggio — ice hockey player
- Francesco Bellini — business man
- Mario Bellissimo — lawyer
- Vince Bellissimo — ice hockey player
- Sean Bentivoglio — ice hockey player
- Paul Beraldo — ice hockey player
- Lorenzo Berardinetti — Ontario politician
- Eddy Berdusco — former soccer player
- Mario Bernardi — conductor and pianist
- Massimo Bertocchi — Olympic decathlete
- Reno Bertoia — baseball player
- Jimi Bertucci — co-founder of Italian Walk of Fame
- Todd Bertuzzi — ice hockey player
- Tyler Bertuzzi — ice hockey player
- Gino Berretta — football player
- Maurizio Bevilacqua — politician
- Wayne Bianchin — ice hockey player
- Hank Biasatti — former basketball and baseball player
- Dave Bidini — musician and writer
- Alessandro Biello — soccer player
- Mauro Biello — former soccer player and current coach
- Kevin Bieksa — former ice hockey player
- Luke Bilyk — actor
- Dan Biocchi — politician and former athlete
- Jack Bionda (1933 – 1999) — lacrosse and ice hockey player
- Joseph Blandisi — ice hockey player
- Michael Bonacini — celebrity chef, restaurant owner
- Brandon Bonifacio — soccer player
- Béatrice Bonifassi — vocalist
- Massimo Boninsegni — physicist and professor
- Kathy Borrelli — politician
- Luciano Borsato — ice hockey player
- Robert Bortuzzo — ice hockey player
- Peter Bosa (1927 – 1998) — politician
- Emilio Bottiglieri — soccer player
- Gustavo Bounous — doctor
- Garen Boyajian — actor
- Rick Bragnalo — ice hockey player
- Marco Brambilla — video artist
- Angelo Branca — British Columbian judge
- Paula Brancati — actress
- Dino Bravo (1948 – 1993) — wrestler
- François-Joseph Bressani (1612 – 1672) — Jesuit missionary and map maker
- Gino Brito — wrestler
- Patrick Brown — politician
- Mario Brunetta — ice hockey goaltender
- Carmelo Bruzzese — mobster
- Michael Bublé — singer and actor
- Nick Bucci — baseball player
- Jenna Buglioni — ice hockey player
- Wally Buono — coach of British Columbia Lions
- Tommy Burns — boxer
- Silvana Burtini — soccer player
- Joe Busillo — ice hockey player
- Alessandro Busti — soccer player
- Rudy Buttignol — television network executive

== C ==
- Charles Caccia — former politician
- Leone Caetani — Prince of Teano, politician, Islamacist, author, linguist, world traveller
- Sveva Caetani — artist
- Drake Caggiula — ice hockey player
- Luca Cagnoni — ice hockey player
- Paul Calandra — politician
- Salvatore Calautti (1971/72 – 2013) — mobster
- Pietro Calendino — British Columbia politician
- Marco Calliari — singer
- Jackie Callura — boxer
- Jim Camazzola — ice hockey player
- Tony Camazzola — ice hockey player
- Michael Cammalleri — ice hockey player
- Matteo Campagna — soccer player
- Rick Campanelli — television personality
- John Campea — film critic, video blogger, internet host
- Chris Campoli — ice hockey player
- Kyle Capobianco — ice hockey player
- Herb Capozzi (1925 – 2011) — businessman
- Vittorio Capparelli — politician
- Massimo Capra — chef
- Frank Caprice — ice hockey player
- Luca Caputi — ice hockey player
- Frank Caputo — politician
- Martino Caputo — mobster
- Alessia Cara — singer, songwriter
- Giulio Caravatta — football player
- Daniel Carcillo — ice hockey player
- Michael Carcone — ice hockey player
- Marco Carducci — soccer player
- Jesse Carere — actor
- Pasquale Carpino (1936 – 2005) — chef
- Luciana Carro — actress
- Alfonso Caruana — mobster
- Pat Caruso — field hockey player
- John Cassini — actor
- Tony Cassolato — ice hockey player
- Jonathan Castagna — ice hockey player
- Annamarie Castrilli — former politician
- Daniel Catenacci — ice hockey player
- Tony Caterina — politician
- Carlo Cattarello — corporal with the Canadian Armed Forces
- John Catucci — television personality
- Michela Cava — ice hockey player
- Cosimo Cavallaro — artist, filmmaker and sculptor
- Gino Cavallini — ice hockey player
- Lucas Cavallini — soccer player
- Paul Cavallini — ice hockey player
- Giovanni Cazzetta — biker
- Salvatore Cazzetta — biker
- Paolo Ceccarelli — soccer goalkeeper
- Fulvio Cecere — actor
- Cody Ceci — ice hockey player
- Joe Ceci — politician
- Rita Celli — journalist and television personality
- Gene Ceppetelli — former soccer player
- Michael Cera — actor
- Erica Cerra — actress
- Bob Chiarelli — politician
- Charly Chiarelli — writer
- Gina Chiarelli — actress
- Peter Chiarelli — ice hockey general manager
- Rick Chiarelli — Ottawa city councillor
- Rita Chiarelli — blues singer
- Talia Chiarelli — gymnast
- Jason Chimera — ice hockey player
- Andy Chiodo — ice hockey player
- Juan Chioran — voice actor and singer
- Mario Chitaroni — ice hockey player
- Hayden Christensen — actor and producer
- Frank Ciaccia — former soccer player
- John Ciaccia — cabinet minister
- Tavio Ciccarelli — soccer player
- Dino Ciccarelli — retired ice hockey player
- Enrico Ciccone — retired ice hockey player; hockey player agent
- Jerry Ciccoritti — film, television, and theatre director
- Tony Cimellaro — ice hockey player
- Robert Cimetta — ice hockey player
- Joe Cimino — former politician
- Antonio di Ciocco — former politician
- Joe Cirella — retired NHL player
- Anthony Cirelli — ice hockey player
- Monica Ciriello — politician
- Jason Cirone — ice hockey player
- Vittorio Coco — journalist and politician
- Andrew Cogliano — ice hockey player
- Carlo Colaiacovo — ice hockey player
- Paulo Colaiacovo — ice hockey goaltender
- Enrico Colantoni — actor
- Josh Colle — politician
- Michael Colle — Ontario politician
- Giuseppe Coluccio — mobster
- Antonio Commisso — mobster
- Cosimo Commisso — mobster
- Cosimo Commisso — scientist
- Cosimo Commisso — soccer player
- Joe Comuzzi — politician
- Enzo Concina — soccer player
- Tony Condello — wrestler
- Santo Condorelli — Olympic swimmer
- Lucas Condotta — ice hockey player
- Luca Congi — football player
- Alexander Conti — actor
- Joe Contini — ice hockey player
- Carlo Corazzin — former soccer player
- Antonio Cordasco (1863 – 1921) — padrone and newspaper owner
- Joseph Cordiano — Ontario politician
- Steve Corino — wrestler
- Rick Cornacchia — former ice hockey player and coach
- Frank Corrado — ice hockey player
- Matthew Corrente — ice hockey player
- Jim Corsi — ice hockey player
- Daniel Corso — ice hockey player
- Pat Cortina — ice hockey coach
- Frank Cosentino — football player
- Sam Cosentino — sports analyst
- Sebastian Cossa — ice hockey player
- Paulo Costanzo — actor
- Joseph Cramarossa — ice hockey player
- Bryan Cristante — soccer player
- Vincent Crisanti — politician
- Ed Cristofoli — ice hockey player
- Frank Cotroni (1931 – 2004) — mobster, Cotroni crime family
- Vincenzo Cotroni (1911 – 1984) — mobster, Cotroni crime family
- Michael Cuccione (1985 – 2001) — child actor
- Raymond Culos — author
- Mark Cundari — ice hockey player
- James Cunningham — comedian
- Antonio Cupo — actor
- Bill Cupolo — ice hockey player
- Freddy Curci — vocalist and songwriter
- Pat Curcio — ice hockey player
- Bobby Curtola — musician
- Angela Cutrone — speed skater
- William Cusano — Quebec politician
- Joe Cuzzetto — soccer player
- Rudy Cuzzetto — politician

== D ==
- Steffi D — singer
- Matt D'Agostini — ice hockey player
- Michael D'Agostino — soccer player
- Paul D'Agostino — former soccer player
- Dalbello — recording artist
- Charlotte D'Alessio — model
- Corrie D'Alessio — ice hockey player
- Jillian D'Alessio — sprint kayaker
- Antonio D'Alfonso — bilingual writer, editor, translator and filmmaker
- John D'Amico — ice hockey player
- Scott D'Amore — professional wrestler
- Frank D'Angelo — entrepreneur
- Sabrina D'Angelo — soccer player
- Camilla D’Errico — artist
- Peter Dalla Riva — football player
- Cynthia Dale — actress
- Jennifer Dale — actress
- Riley Damiani — ice hockey player
- Cindy Daniel — singer
- Yvonne De Carlo (1922 – 2007) — actress
- Alex De Carolis — soccer player
- Jessica De Filippo — soccer player
- Alessia De Gasperis, also known under the mononym Kai — singer
- Alfredo De Gasperis (1934 – 2013) — founder of construction company ConDrain
- Filippo De Grassi (1793 – 1877) — soldier
- Pierre-Charles de Liette (1697 – 1749) — Colonial army officer in New France and Louisiana
- Pasquale de Luca — former soccer player
- Sergio De Luca — former soccer player
- Nick De Santis — former soccer player
- Rita de Santis — politician
- Tony De Thomasis — soccer manager
- Sandro DeAngelis — football player
- Marcel DeBellis — soccer player
- Dante DeCaro — former guitarist
- Anne Marie DeCicco-Best — mayor
- Johnnie Dee — vocalist
- Dean DeFazio — ice hockey player
- Devlin DeFrancesco — race car driver
- The DeFranco Family — music group
- Tony DeFranco — singer and musician, Port Colborne, Ontario
- Vincenzo DeMaria — mobster
- Francesco Del Balso (1970 – 2023) — mobster
- Steven Del Duca — politician
- Mike Del Grande — politician
- Dean Del Mastro — former politician
- Ethan Del Mastro — ice hockey player
- Michael Del Zotto — ice hockey player
- Vincent Della Noce — politician
- Kristin Della Rovere — ice hockey player
- Stefan Della Rovere — ice hockey player
- Eddie Della Siepe — comedian and actor
- Raffaele Delle Donne — mobster
- Alex Delvecchio — ice hockey player
- Denny DeMarchi — multi-instrumental musician
- Steve DeMarchi — guitarist
- Ab DeMarco (1916 – 1989) — ice hockey player
- Ab DeMarco, Jr. — ice hockey player
- Bill Derlago — ice hockey player
- John DeSantis — actor
- Daniel DeSanto — actor
- Jim Devellano — businessman
- Justin DiBenedetto — ice hockey player
- Devin DiDiomete — ice hockey player
- Chris DiDomenico — ice hockey player
- Bob DiLuca — soccer player
- Fabio di Celmo (1965 – 1997) — entrepreneur
- Pier Giorgio Di Cicco — poet
- Caroline Di Cocco — Ontario politician
- Alan Di Fiore — screenwriter and film producer
- Larry Di Ianni — mayor of Hamilton, Ontario
- Natalie Di Luccio — international multilingual singer
- Mary di Michele — poet, writer and academic
- Consiglio Di Nino — Senator
- Odoardo Di Santo — Ontario politician
- Sergio Di Zio — actor
- Anthony Di Biase — soccer player
- Michael Di Biase — politician
- Pier Giorgio Di Cicco — poet, editor and priest
- Joseph Di Chiara — soccer player
- Justin Di Ciano — politician
- Gino DiFlorio — former soccer player
- Jessica DiGirolamo — ice hockey player
- Marco Di Girolamo — former rugby player
- Phillip Di Giuseppe — ice hockey player
- Massimo Di Ioia — former soccer player
- Nicola Di Iorio — politician
- Vincenzo Di Nicola — psychologist, psychiatrist and philosopher
- Enzo Di Pede — former soccer goalkeeper
- Giuseppe di Salvatore — sports shooter
- Daniel Di Tomasso — actor
- Sergio Di Zio — actor
- Nate DiCasmirro — ice hockey player
- Debra DiGiovanni — comedian
- Rob DiMaio — ice hockey player
- Rosie DiManno — journalist
- Adam DiMarco — actor
- Melissa DiMarco — actress and television personality
- Cheri DiNovo — politician
- Jim Diodati — politician
- Joe DiPenta — ice hockey player
- Michael DiPietro — ice hockey player
- David Diplacido — former soccer player
- Nick Discepola — politician
- Jason DiTullio — former soccer player
- Fabrizio Divari — tattoo artist
- Hnat Domenichelli — former ice hockey player
- Eden Donatelli — short track speedskater
- Marc Donato — actor
- Patrick Dovigi — businessman
- Vince Dunn — ice hockey player

== E ==
- Pat Ercoli — former soccer player
- Angelo Esposito — ice hockey player
- Phil Esposito — former ice hockey player, top NHL goalscorer of the 1960s and 1970s
- Tony Esposito — former ice hockey goaltender
- Patrick Esposito Di Napoli (1964 – 1994) — musician
- Daniella Evangelista — actress
- Linda Evangelista — supermodel
- Luke Evangelista — ice hockey player
- Tony Evangelista — soccer referee
- Fred Ewanuick — actor

== F ==
- Robby Fabbri — ice hockey player
- Dante Fabbro — ice hockey player
- Joe Fabbro — politician
- Lara Fabian — singer
- Gianfranco Facchineri — soccer player
- Peter Fallico — designer and television personality
- Adam Fantilli — ice hockey player
- Julian Fantino — former Toronto police chief and former Ontario Provincial Police Commissioner
- Paul Faraci (1928 – 2016) — businessman
- Alvaro Farinacci — politician
- Dan Fascinato — ice hockey player
- Drew Fata — ice hockey player
- Rico Fata — ice hockey player
- Justin Fazio — ice hockey player
- Vic Fedeli — politician
- Dino Felicetti — former ice hockey player
- Landon Ferraro — ice hockey player
- Mario Ferraro — ice hockey player
- Ray Ferraro — ice hockey player, now sports analyst
- Max Ferrari — soccer player
- Edoardo Ferrari-Fontana (1878 – 1936) — tenor
- Riley Ferrazzo — soccer player
- Michelle Ferreri — politician
- Marisa Ferretti Barth — politician
- Claudia Ferri — actress
- Mario Ferri — community organizer
- Massimo Ferrin — soccer player
- Dan Ferrone — Canadian football player
- Pat Fiacco — businessman
- Cosimo Filane — musician and businessperson
- Jonelle Filigno — soccer player
- Fab Filippo — actor
- Peter Fiorentino — ice hockey player
- Serge Fiori — vocalist and guitarist
- Tony Fiore — ice hockey player
- Giovanni Fiore — ice hockey player
- Joe Fiorito — journalist and novelist
- Nick Fiorucci — electronic and dance music DJ
- Vittorio Fiorucci — poster artist
- Paola Flocchini — computer scientist
- Rudy Florio — football player
- Marcus Foligno — ice hockey player
- Mike Foligno — former ice hockey player
- Nick Foligno — ice hockey player
- Joe Fontana — politician
- Lou Fontinato (1932 – 2016) — ice hockey player
- Sammy Forcillo (1950 – 2026) — former politician
- Ric Formosa — musician
- Laura Fortino — ice hockey player
- John Forzani — former Canadian Football League player and businessman
- Rick Fox — basketball player (Bahamanian father)
- Emilio Fraietta — former Canadian football player
- Lou Franceschetti — ice hockey player
- Mauro Francis — British Columbia politician
- Giuliano Frano — soccer player
- Joe Fratesi — former mayor of Sault Ste. Marie, Ontario
- Matt Frattin — ice hockey player
- Bruno Freschi — architect
- Jeffrey Frisch — skier
- David Fronimadis — former soccer player
- Liza Frulla — politician
- Zachary Fucale — ice hockey goaltender
- Giorgia Fumanti — singer
- Giovanni Furlani (1936 – 2019) — ice hockey player

== G ==
- Sarah Gadon — actress
- Phil Gaglardi (1913 – 1995) — British Columbia politician
- Tom Gaglardi — businessman
- Alfonso Gagliano (1942 – 2020) — politician involved in the sponsorship scandal
- Gaetano Gagliano (1917 – 2016) — businessman and entrepreneur
- Tony Gagliano — businessman and arts mogul
- Laurent Gagliardi — film director
- Rocco Galati — lawyer
- Steve Galluccio — screenwriter
- Mary Garofalo — television journalist
- Luca Gasparotto — soccer player
- Vince Gasparro — politician
- Simon Gatti — former soccer player
- Arturo Gatti (1972 – 2009) — professional boxer
- Mario Gentile — politician
- Ken Georgetti — labour leader
- Dianne Gerace — former track athlete
- Bruno Gerussi (1928 – 1995) — actor
- Roberto Giacomi — soccer player
- Eddie Giacomin — ice hockey player
- Mario Giallonardo — ice hockey player
- Adam Giambrone — Toronto city councillor and New Democratic Party activist
- David Giammarco — actor
- Dan Giancola — football player
- Dennis Giannini — ice hockey player
- Giacomo Gianniotti — actor
- Tamara Giaquinto — ice hockey player
- Stefano Giliati — ice hockey player
- Basilio Giordano — politician
- Lorenzo Giordano — mobster
- Mark Giordano — ice hockey player
- Nadia Giosia — cooking personality
- Larry Giovando — politician
- Daniel Girardi — ice hockey player
- Gerome Giudice — former ice hockey player
- Joseph Giunta (1911 – 2001) — painter
- Gabriella Goliger — novelist
- Gigi Gorgeous — actress and model
- Dakota Goyo — actor
- Marc-André Gragnani — ice hockey player
- Anthony Granato – baseball player
- Sandro Grande — former soccer player
- Tony Grande — politician
- Thomas Grandi — skier
- Marco Grazzini — actor
- Sabrina Grdevich — actress
- Phil Lo Greco — boxer
- Emma Greco — ice hockey player
- Jessica Greco — comedian
- Johnny Greco — boxer
- Peter Greco — former soccer player
- Christian Greco-Taylor — soccer player
- Grimes — musician
- Julia Grosso — soccer player
- Silvia Gualtieri — politician
- Peter Guarasci — basketball player
- Albina Guarnieri — politician
- Michael Guglielmin — politician
- Aldo Guidolin (1932 – 2015) — ice hockey player
- Bep Guidolin (1925 – 2008) — ice hockey player
- Garry Guzzo — Ontario politician
- Patsy Guzzo (1914 – 1993) — ice hockey player
- Vincenzo Guzzo — entrepreneur

== H ==
- Jacqueline Hennessy — journalist and television personality
- Jill Hennessy — actress and musician
- Jacob Hoggard — musician, lead singer of the pop-rock band Hedley
- Linda Hutcheon (Bortolotti) — Toronto academic, literary and opera scholar

== I ==
- Selenia Iacchelli — soccer player
- Edward Iacobucci — professor
- Frank Iacobucci — former Supreme Court of Canada justice
- Angelo Iacono — politician
- Lucio Ianiero — former soccer player
- Tony Ianno — politician
- Dan Iannuzzi — entrepreneur
- Tony Ianzelo — director and cinematographer
- Robert Iarusci — former soccer player
- Andrea Iervolino — film producer
- Illangelo — musician
- Lily Inglis (1926 – 2010) — architect
- Ralph Intranuovo — former ice hockey player
- Vincent Iorio — ice hockey player
- Carmine Isacco — soccer coach

== J ==
- Alessandro Juliani — voice actor
- John Juliani (1940 – 2003) — actor

== K ==
- Ethan Kath — singer and songwriter
- Jessica Parker Kennedy — actress
- Vince Kerrio — businessman and politician
- Victor Kodelja — former soccer player

== L ==
- Alyssa Lagonia — soccer player
- David Lametti — politician
- Thomas W. LaSorda — Vice-Chairman and President of Chrysler
- Florence Lassandro (1900 – 1923) — mobster; last woman to be executed in Alberta
- Nicholas Latifi — race car driver
- Patricia Lattanzio — politician
- Anthony Leardi — politician
- Stephen Lecce — politician
- Tony Lecce — former soccer player
- Patrice Lefebvre — former ice hockey player
- Betta Lemme — singer and songwriter
- Bob Lenarduzzi — soccer player and coach
- Mike Lenarduzzi — former ice hockey player
- Sam Lenarduzzi — former soccer player
- Frank Lenti (1947 – 2026) — biker
- Laureano Leone — former Ontario politician
- Lucas Lessio — ice hockey player
- Tino Lettieri — former soccer player
- Tony Licari (1921 – 2013) — ice hockey player
- Carlo Liconti — film producer
- Peter Li Preti — former politician
- Marc Liegghio — football player
- Tony Loffreda — Senator from Quebec
- Spencer Lofranco — actor
- Luigi Logrippo — professor
- Johnny Lombardi — broadcasting executive
- Matthew Lombardi — ice hockey player
- Andrea Lombardo — soccer player
- Carmen Lombardo (1903 – 1971) — musician
- Guy Lombardo (1902 – 1977) — musician and band leader
- Lebert Lombardo — musician
- Victor Lombardo — musician
- Jake Lucchini — ice hockey player
- Rocco Luccisano — politician
- Roberto Luongo — ice hockey goaltender
- Tony Lupusella — former politician

== M ==
- Joseph Macaluso — politician
- François N. Macerola — lawyer and film executive
- Cosmo Maciocia — politician
- Danny Maciocia — football coach
- Antonio Macrì (1904 – 1975) — mobster
- Joe Magliocca — politician
- Franco Magnifico — businessman and politician
- Raine Maida — musician (Our Lady Peace)
- James Malatesta — ice hockey player
- Ray Maluta — ice hockey player
- Giorgio Mammoliti (1961 – 2026) — Ontario politician
- Mark Mancari — ice hockey player
- Joseph Mancinelli — trade unionist
- Gaby Mancini — former boxer
- Remo Mancini — former politician
- Tony Mancini (1913 – 1990) — former boxer
- Nick Mancuso — actor
- Kevin Mandolese — ice hockey player
- Andrew Mangiapane — ice hockey player
- Chris Mannella — soccer player
- Anthony S. Manera — former CBC president
- Cesare Maniago — former ice hockey player
- Bob Manno — former ice hockey player
- Maurizio Mansi — former ice hockey player
- Jay Manuel — make-up artist
- Tom Marazzo — activist
- Carmine Marcantonio — former soccer player
- Rosario Marchese — Ontario politician
- Sergio Marchi — politician
- Sergio Marchionne (1952 – 2018) — former CEO of Fiat and Chrysler
- Charles Marega — sculptor
- Santino Marella — professional wrestler, martial artist
- Carlo Marini — former soccer player
- Hector Marini — former ice hockey player
- Frank Marino — guitarist
- Rebecca Marino — tennis player
- John Mariotti – baseball player
- Dan Marouelli — former ice hockey referee
- Joseph Marrese — former politician
- Gabriella Martinelli — film producer
- Medo Martinello — former box lacrosse
- Quinto Martini — politician and real estate broker
- Porter Martone — ice hockey player
- Adam Mascherin — ice hockey player
- Paul Masotti — former football player
- Jack Masters — politician
- Pat Mastroianni — actor
- Gabe Mastromatteo — swimmer
- Irene Mathyssen — politician
- Gino Matrundola — former politician
- Jon Matsumoto — ice hockey player
- Joe Mattacchione — former soccer player
- Ella Matteucci — ice hockey and baseball player
- Mike Matteucci — ice hockey player
- Arthur Mauro — lawyer and businessman
- Bill Mauro — Ontario politician
- Frank Mazzilli — former politician
- Frank Mazzuca — former politician
- Tyler Medeiros — singer
- Julian Melchiori — ice hockey player
- Mary Melfi — novelist, poet, playwright
- Eric Melillo — politician
- Victor Mete — ice hockey player
- Tanya Memme — television presenter and actress in Sell This House
- Gerry Mendicino — actor
- Marco Mendicino — politician
- Paul Meschino — architect
- Corrado Micalef — former ice hockey player
- Angelo Miceli — ice hockey player
- Salvatore Miceli — mobster
- Marco Micone — Quebec academic, playwright and translator
- Thomas Milani — former ice hockey player
- Ramona Milano — actress
- Giovanna Mingarelli — politician
- Aldo Maniacco (1934 – 2025) — ice hockey player
- Maria Minna — politician
- Eddie Mio — former ice hockey goaltender
- Domenic Mobilio (1969 – 2004) — former soccer player
- Michele Modica — mobster
- Guido Molinari (1933 – 2004) — artist
- Tina Molinari — politician
- Melissa Molinaro — model
- Alessandro Momesso — soccer player
- Sergio Momesso — ice hockey player
- Richard Monette (1944 – 2008) — actor and director
- Victor Montagliani — businessman, former president of Canadian Soccer Association
- Salvatore Montagna (1971 – 2011) — mobster
- Carlo Montemurro — former ice hockey player
- Enio Mora (1949 – 1996) — mobster
- Angie Moretto — former ice hockey player
- Marc Moro — former ice hockey player
- Mike Morreale — former football player
- Joe Morselli — Quebec businessman involved in the Sponsorship scandal
- Carmelina Moscato — soccer player
- Domenico Moschella — politician
- Giovanni Muscedere — biker and mobster.
- Marcello Musto — professor
- Jason Muzzatti — former ice hockey player
- Jake Muzzin — ice hockey player

== N ==
- Angelina Napolitano (1882 – 1932) — first woman in Canada to use the battered woman defence on a murder charge
- Tony Nappo — actor
- Tony Nardi — bilingual actor
- Silvio Narizzano — film and television director
- Angelo Natale — former trade union leader
- Vincenzo Natali — film director and screenwriter
- Sergio Navarretta — film director and producer
- Nick Nero — mobster
- Davide Nicoletti — ice hockey player
- Sabatino Nicolucci — mobster
- Frank Nigro — former ice hockey player
- Guido Nincheri (1885 – 1973) — artist
- Dante Nori – baseball player
- Aldo Nova — musician and vocalist
- Frances Nunziata — Toronto city councillor
- John Nunziata — politician

== O ==
- Peter Oliva — novelist
- Andrew Olivieri — former soccer player
- Nancy Olivieri — haematologist
- Giuliano Oliviero — former soccer player
- America Olivo — actress, singer, and model
- Easton Ongaro — soccer player
- David Orazietti — politician
- Alexandra Orlando — rhythmic gymnast
- Gaetano Orlando — ice hockey player
- Johnny Orlando — singer
- Marina Orsini — actress
- Romano Orzari — actor

== P ==
- Frank G. Paci — writer, author of The Italians and 12 novels
- Massimo Pacetti — politician
- Chiara Padovani — politician
- Donato Paduano — former boxer
- Michel Pagliaro — musician
- Pete Palangio (1908 – 2004) — ice hockey player
- Al Palladini (1943 – 2001) — politician
- Matthew Palleschi — professional soccer player
- Louie Palu — photographer and filmmaker
- Gaetano Panepinto (1959 – 2000) — mobster
- Roberto Pannunzi — mobster
- Joe Pantalone — Toronto city councillor
- Alessandra Paonessa — opera singer
- Carmen Papalia — artist
- Johnny Papalia (1924 – 1997) — mobster
- Melanie Papalia — actress
- John Parco — ice hockey coach
- Sarina Paris — singer
- Tony Parisi (1941 – 2000) — wrestler
- Paul Bonifacio Parkinson — figure skater
- Tony Parsons — presenter
- Mario Parente — biker
- Eli Pasquale — former basketball player
- Nico Pasquotti — soccer player
- Lui Passaglia — former football player
- Patrizia — singer
- Bruno Pauletto — physiologist
- Matthew Peca — ice hockey player
- Michael Peca — ice hockey player
- Maria Pellegrini — operatic soprano
- Bob Perani (1942 – 2012) — ice hockey goaltender
- Cole Perfetti — ice hockey player
- Brendan Perlini — ice hockey player
- Brett Perlini — ice hockey player
- Fred Perlini — ice hockey player
- Dominic Perri — politician
- Paul Perri — actor
- Rocco Perri (1887 – ?) — mobster
- Sandro Perri — musician
- Anthony Perruzza — Ontario politician
- Jordan Perruzza — soccer player
- Angelo Persichilli — journalist
- Joe Peschisolido — politician
- Paul Peschisolido — soccer player
- Alex Petan — ice hockey player
- Nic Petan — ice hockey player
- Luca Petrasso — soccer player
- Michael Petrasso — soccer player
- Andi Petrillo — sports anchor
- Penny Petrone (1925 – 2005) — writer and educator
- Nina Petronzio — interior designer
- Michael Pezzetta — ice hockey player
- Emilio Picariello (1875 or 1879 – 1923) — mobster
- David Piccini — politician
- Joe Piccininni — city councillor
- Alessandra Piccione — screenwriter and producer
- Alex Pietrangelo — ice hockey player
- Amelia Pietrangelo — soccer player
- Frank Pietrangelo — ice hockey player
- Phil Pietroniro — ice hockey player
- Paolo Pietropaolo — radio host and musician
- Vincenzo Pietropaolo — photographer
- Tony Pignatiello — soccer player
- Gary Pillitteri — politician
- Luca Pinelli — ice hockey player
- Peter Pinizzotto — soccer coach
- Steve Pinizzotto — ice hockey player
- Roy Piovesana — teacher and historian
- Fernando Pisani — ice hockey player
- Matteo Piscopo — soccer player
- Joseph Pivato — writer, literary scholar and academic
- Nick Pivetta — baseball player
- Nevio Pizzolitto — soccer player
- Rocco Placentino — soccer player
- Nick Plastino — ice hockey player
- Johnny Plescio — biker
- Robert Poëti — politician
- Marcello Polisi — soccer player
- Matteo Polisi — soccer player
- Marco Polo — music producer
- Claudio Polsinelli — former Ontario politician
- Aaron Poole — actor
- Carly Pope — actress
- Kris Pope — actor
- Victor Posa — former National Hockey League player
- Christian Potenza — actor
- Giovanni Princigalli; director, historian, activist
- Gene Principe — sports reporter
- Monica Proietti, aka Machine Gun Molly (1940 – 1967) — bank robber
- Cristine Prosperi — actress
- Carmen Provenzano (1942 – 2005) — politician
- Christian Provenzano — politician
- Dina Pugliese — Toronto television personality
- Sandra Pupatello — Ontario politician
- Christina Putigna — ice hockey player

== Q ==
- Louis Quilico (1925 – 2000) — opera singer

== R ==
- Michele Racco (1913 – 1980) — mobster
- Angelo Raffin — former Canadian football player
- Gianmarco Raimondo — racing driver
- Mauro Ranallo — sportscaster
- Simone Rapisarda Casanova — filmmaker
- Gennaro Raso — biker
- Rick Ravanello — actor
- Ross Rebagliati — snowboarder
- Mark Recchi — ice hockey player
- Gino Reda — television personality
- Marco Reda — soccer player
- Karen Redman — politician
- Paolo Renda (1933 – Disappeared 2010) — mobster
- Austin Ricci — soccer player
- Italia Ricci — actress
- Mike Ricci — former ice hockey player
- Mike Ricci — fighter
- Nick Ricci — former ice hockey player
- Nino Ricci — novelist
- Regolo Ricci — artist
- Alessandro Riggi — soccer player
- Lou Rinaldi — politician
- Nicola Riopel — ice hockey goaltender
- Marco Rizi — former soccer player
- Massimo Rizzo — ice hockey player
- Tony Rizzo — Ontario politician
- Garth Rizzuto — former ice hockey player
- Nicolo Rizzuto (1924 – 2010) — mobster, Rizzuto crime family
- Pietro Rizzuto (1934 – 1997) — businessman and Senator
- Vito Rizzuto (1946 – 2013) — mobster
- Anna Roberts — politician
- Darcy Robinson (1981 – 2007) — ice hockey player
- David Rocco — actor, producer, and cooking personality
- Vince Rocco — ice hockey player
- Tony Romandini — musician
- Jordan Romano — professional baseball player
- Roberto Romano — former ice hockey goaltender
- Rocco Romano — football player
- Ross Romano — Ontario politician
- Rocco Romeo — soccer player
- Marco Rosa — ice hockey player
- Mike Rosati — former ice hockey player
- Cristina Rosato — actress
- Tony Rosato (1954 – 2017) — actor
- Anthony Rosenroll (1857 – 1945) — businessman
- Carlo Rossi — politician
- Chantal Rossi — politician
- Rocco Rossi — businessman
- Vittorio Rossi — playwright, screenwriter, actor, and director
- Anthony Rota — politician
- Carlo Rota — actor
- Filomena Rotiroti — politician
- Andrew Rotilio – actor
- Guy Rubino — chef
- Steve Rucchin — former ice hockey player
- Adamo Ruggiero — actor
- Adam Russo — ice hockey goaltender
- Erminia Russo — volleyball player

== S ==
- Laura Sabia (1916 – 1996) — social activist and feminist
- Michael Sabia — businessman
- Ted Salci — former mayor
- Frank Salerno (1962 – 2006) — biker
- Alphonse W. Salomone Jr. (1919 – 1993) — hotelier
- Dave Salmoni — animal trainer, entertainer and television producer
- Bobby Sanguinetti — ice hockey player
- Greg Sansone — former sports anchor
- Ivana Santilli — singer
- Mike Santorelli — ice hockey player
- Angelo Santucci — former football player
- Daniela Sanzone — journalist
- Joey Saputo — businessman
- Lino Saputo — businessman and billionaire – owner of Saputo Inc.
- Will Sasso — actor and comedian
- Ryan Savoia — ice hockey player
- Raymond Sawada — ice hockey player
- Mario Scalzo — ice hockey player
- Giulio Scandella — ice hockey player
- Marco Scandella — ice hockey player
- Ray Scapinello — ice hockey player
- Michele Scarabelli — actress
- Pietro Scarcella — mobster
- Michael Scarola — sprint canoer
- Francis Scarpaleggia — politician
- Frank Scarpitti — mayor
- Matteo Schiavoni — soccer player
- Gino Schiraldi — former soccer player
- Joe Schiraldi — former soccer player
- Enio Sclisizzi (1925 – 2012) — ice hockey player
- Melanie Scrofano — actress
- Rob Scuderi — ice hockey player
- Lorraine Segato — singer
- Mario Sergio — Ontario politician
- Michael Sgarbossa — ice hockey player
- Judy Sgro — politician
- Dave Siciliano — ice hockey coach and player
- Floria Sigismondi — photographer
- Tony Silipo — former Ontario politician
- Margot Sikabonyi — actress
- Andrew Simone — physician
- Hannah Simone — television personality
- Chris Sky — personality
- Gino Soccio — disco record producer
- Rocco Sollecito (1949 – 2016) — mobster
- Francesco Sorbara — politician
- Greg Sorbara — Ontario politician
- Martina Sorbara — singer-songwriter
- Erin Spanevello (1987 – 2008) — fashion model
- Michelangelo Spensieri (1949 – 2013) — politician
- Jason Spezza — ice hockey player
- Joe Spina — politician
- Paul Stalteri — soccer player
- Alexander David Stewart (1852 – 1899) — politician
- Chelsea Stewart — soccer player
- Steben Twins — acrobatic performers
- Zack Stortini — ice hockey player
- Sylvana Windsor, Countess of St Andrews — countess

== T ==
- Rick Tabaracci — former ice hockey goaltender
- Alex Tagliani — race car driver
- Joe Tallari — ice hockey player
- Melissa Tancredi — soccer player
- Jeff Tambellini — ice hockey player
- Steve Tambellini — ice hockey general manager
- Paul Tana — film director
- Filomena Tassi — politician
- Dino Tavarone — actor
- Marco Terminesi — soccer player
- Anna Terrana — former politician
- Venus Terzo — actress
- Michael Tibollo — politician
- Martin Tielli — musician and artist
- Farren Timoteo — actor and playwright
- Mark Tinordi — former ice hockey player
- Tony Tirabassi — politician
- Guido Titotto — former soccer player
- Rick Tocchet — ice hockey player
- Tyler Toffoli — ice hockey player
- Philip Tomasino — ice hockey player
- Tony Tomassi — politician
- Tiger Joe Tomasso (1922 – 1988) — former wrestler
- Bernardo Tomei — former ice hockey player
- John Tonelli — former ice hockey player
- Henri de Tonti (1649 – 1704) — explorer in New France
- Alphonse de Tonty (1659 – 1727) — explorer in New France
- Jerry Toppazzini (1931 – 2012) — ice hockey player
- Zellio Toppazzini (1930 – 2001) — ice hockey player
- Raffi Torres — ice hockey player
- Joe Trasolini — politician
- Anna Maria Tremonti — journalist and CBC radio announcer
- Carter Trevisani — ice hockey player
- Jay Triano — former basketball player
- Ricardo Trogi — actor and filmmaker
- Domenic Troiano (1946 – 2005) — musician
- Carmine Tucci (1933 – 1990) — ice hockey goaltender
- Marty Turco — ice hockey goaltender
- Kayla Tutino — ice hockey player

== U ==
- Gene Ubriaco — former ice hockey player
- Julian Uccello — soccer player
- Luca Uccello — soccer player

== V ==
- Tony Valeri — politician
- Frank Valeriote — politician
- Joseph Valtellini — kickboxer
- Gino Vannelli — musician
- Joe Vannelli — musician
- Phil Varone — ice hockey player
- Karen Vecchio — politician
- Joe Veleno — ice hockey player
- Frank Venneri — politician
- Carmine Verduci (1959 – 2014) — mobster
- Mike Vernace — ice hockey player
- Ben Viccari — former journalist
- Gabriel Vilardi — ice hockey player
- Paolo Violi (1938 – 1978) — mobster
- David Visentin — actor
- Jonathan Viscosi — soccer player
- Joe Volpe — politician
- Paul Volpe (1927 – 1983) — mobster
- Joey Votto — baseball player
- Lisa Vultaggio — actress

== W ==
- Graham Wardle — actor, filmmaker and photographer
- Jeff Wincott — martial artist and actor
- Michael Wincott — actor

== X ==
- Davide Xausa — former soccer player

== Z ==
- Giuliano Zaccardelli — former Commissioner of the Royal Canadian Mounted Police
- Robert Zambito — politician
- Frank Zampino — politician and accountant
- Dominic Zamprogna — actor
- Sergio Zanatta — former soccer player
- Frank Zaneth — Mountie
- Paul Zanette — ice hockey player
- Sol Zanetti — politician
- Chiara Zanni — actress
- Ron Zanussi — former ice hockey player
- Zappacosta — singer and songwriter
- Sergio Zardini — bobsledder
- Bruno Zarrillo — former ice hockey player
- Gianluca Zavarise — soccer player
- Rachel Zeffira — musician
- John Zerucelli — politician
- Lorena Ziraldo — artist
- Rocco Zito (1928 – 2016) — mobster
- Katia Zuccarelli — singer
