= Piscopo =

Piscopo is an Italian surname. Notable people with the surname include:

- Daniel Piscopo, Maltese politician and minister
- Edoardo Piscopo, Italian racing driver
- Filippo Piscopo, Italian filmmaker
- Joe Piscopo, American comedian and actor
- Matteo Piscopo, Canadian soccer player
- Tullio De Piscopo, Italian drummer and singer
