= Alesi =

Alesi is a surname. Notable people with the surname include:

- Andrija Aleši, Renaissance sculptor and master architect
- Giuliano Alesi (born 1999), French racing driver
- James Alesi, New York State Senator
- Jean Alesi (born 1964), French racing driver of Italian origins
- Octavio Alesi (born 1986), Venezuelan swimmer
- Valerio Alesi (born 1966), former professional soccer player
