= Misstress Barbara =

Italian-born Canadian producer, DJ and singer-songwriter

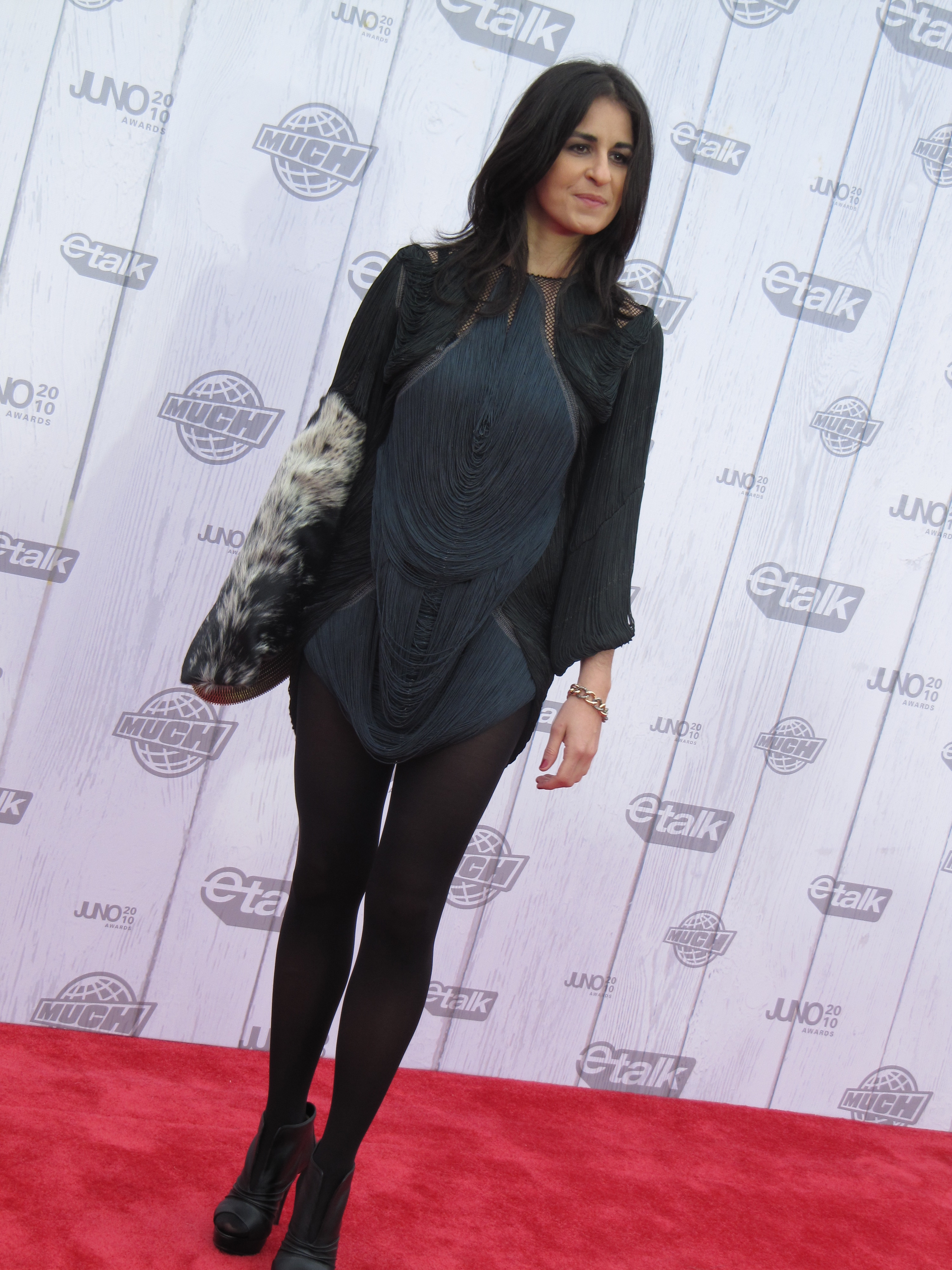
- Misstress Barbara on the red carpet of the 2010 Juno Awards

Background information
- Also known as: Barbara Brown
- Born: Barbara Bonfiglio; 3 December; Catania, Italy
- Genres: Techno; House; Pop
- Occupations: Music producer, DJ, songwriter, singer
- Labels: Iturnem Music; MapleMusic Recordings (Canada)
- Website: Misstress Barbara's Website

Barbara Bonfiglio, better known as Misstress Barbara (the misspelling is an intentional portmanteau [i.e. "miss" and "stress"]), is an Italian-born Canadian producer, DJ and singer-songwriter. Born in Catania, Italy, she moved to Montreal, Quebec, Canada at the age of eight and has resided in the city ever since. She has DJed around the globe and has an extensive discography as a producer.

== Career ==
She holds a Bachelor of Arts in Communications from the Université du Québec à Montréal. After drumming in bands since the age of twelve, she began DJing in 1996 and established record label Relentless in 1999. In 2001 she released the mix album Relentless Beats Vol. 1 (Moonshine Records), with a second volume the following year, along with two mix albums for Trust the DJ. In 2003, to avoid legal issues with a Relentless Records, UK company of the same name, she established ITURNEM. Early success includes her song "Never Could Have Your Heart" being licensed in Rockstar Games' arcade racing video game Midnight Club II. In 2006, she released the mix album Come with Me....

In 2009 she released the debut artist album as a singer, I'm No Human, which was nominated for a 2010 Juno Award for Best Dance Recording of the Year, and included the single "I'm Running", featuring fellow Montreal musician Sam Roberts. The album also features collaborations with Brazilian Girls and Bjorn Yttling of Peter Bjorn and John. "I'm No Human" was born out of unhappy circumstances, sparked by the death of a close family member features Misstress Barbara step from behind the turntables in front of the microphone and was recorded in her home town of Montreal. To perform songs from the album, she created a new live band and draws from her experience in electronic music infusing it with live instruments. The live show debuted at Le Festival International de Jazz de Montréal 2009, to a sold out crowd at Montreal's Club Soda. In July 2010, Misstress Barbara performed for the second year in at row at Le Festival International de Jazz de Montréal.

In April 2012, she released her second album Many Shades of Grey which is, unlike her first album, more of a stand-alone project, with the song "The Right Time" as the first radio single. The live show Many Shades of Grey was nominated for Best Show in "Other" Language at Quebec's ADISQ. In July 2012, she sang her single "The Right Time" at Parliament Hill during Canada Day celebrations and later in that same month she was back at Le Festival International de Jazz de Montréal, at La Société des Arts Technologiques (SAT), to perform her new live show Many Shades of Grey.

== Discography ==
=== Albums ===
- I’m No Human – Maple Music / Iturnem (Canada) – May 2009
- Many Shades of Grey – Maple Music / Iturnem (Canada) – April 2012 – #91 CAN

=== EPs ===
- Steps Towards Comprehension – Tronic (Sweden) – March 1999
- April – Countdown 2000 (Sweden) – April 1999
- Auger Lyer (International Artists EP) – Intec (England) – August 1999
- Sagittarius – Zync (Sweden) – September 1999
- Endless Passion – Iturnem/Relentless (Canada) – October 1999
- Foreign Textures Vol. 1 (by Misstress Barbara & Christian Smith) – Primevil (England) – November 1999
- First Reality – Rotation (England) – November 1999
- Cry & Dry – Iturnem/Relentless (Canada) – December 1999
- Royal Comfort (by Foreign Textures: Misstress Barbara & Christian Smith) – Tronic (Sweden) – January 2000
- Barbara Brown presents: Dammelo, Mi Piace – Strive (Sweden) – February 2000
- For All There's Left – Iturnem/Relentless (Canada) – April 2000
- Relentless Desire – Primate (England) – June 2000
- Zero ID – Zero ID (England) – December 2000
- Barbara Brown presents: Il Minestrone – Primary (England) – December 2000
- Naked Thoughts – Default (Canada) – February 2001
- Emotions on Plastic – Choice (France) – February 2001
- 666FVW – Primevil (England) – February 2001
- Effet Karma – Iturnem/Relentless (Canada) – April 2001
- Growing Pains – Iturnem/Relentless (Canada) – November 2001
- Barbara Brown presents: No More Boundaries, This Ain’t House! – Primary (England) – March 2002
- Misstress Barbara VS Barbara Brown Vol. 1 – Iturnem/Relentless (Canada) – September 2002
- Misstress Barbara VS Barbara Brown Vol. 2 – Iturnem (Canada) – March 2003
- In Da Mooda Da Nite – Iturnem (Canada) – May 2004
- Gloria Grande – Iturnem (Canada) – August 2004
- On Fire (by Misstress Barbara & Carl Cox) – April 2005 – 23rd Century (England)
- Come With Me… – Iturnem (Canada) – April 2006
- K–10 / Azzurri – Bedrock (England) – October 2006
- Barcelona – Border Community (England) – February 2007
- Don’t Leave / Come Back – Iturnem (Canada) – May 2007
- Triangle of Love – Iturnem (Canada) – October 2010
- Finally Mine (H.O.S.H. feat. Misstress Barbara) – Diynamic (Germany) – November 2010
- Tu Seras Mon Roi – Iturnem (Canada) – February 2011
- Et Il Bat – Iturnem (Canada) – March 2011
- The Right Time (Rogers Cup Instrumental Mix) – Iturnem (Canada) – August 2011
- Tenno 5 (part of the Ground Under Ibiza 1 compilation) – Bedrock (England) – July 2014
- Sir G / Mrs G – Tulipa (US) – September 2014
- Zia / Closer – Tronic (Sweden) – March 2015
- Je Suis Charlie – Loose (Italy) – April 2015
- Need That / Do It Again – Tronic (Sweden) – July 2015
- I Feel It / Lied to You – Transmit (US) – September 2015
- Burning (part of the 15 Years of Terminal M – A Sides Vol. 2 compilation) – Terminal M (Germany) – December 2015
- Eyes Wide Shut – Kombination Research (England) – May 2016
- Quarantine (part of the Sonar OFF week compilation) – Tronic (Sweden) – June 2016
- The Right Time (Rogers Cup 2016 Mix) – Iturnem (Canada) – July 2016
- Storm Waves – Alleanza (Malta) – August 2016
- Don't Tease Me – Intec Digital (England) – September 2016
- If You Can't Be Mine (Drumcomplex & Misstress Barbara) – Complex LTD (Germany) – October 2016
- Ivory – Xerie (Spain) – November 2016
- The Right Time (Rogers Cup Epic Mix) – Iturnem (Canada) – Aug 2019
- My Mind Off You – Riot Recordings (Italy) – Aug 2019

=== Remixes ===
- "Fusion" (Foreign Textures) – Primevil (England) – November 1999
- "Glass" (G–Force) – Genetic (Belgium) – October 2000
- "Dashboard" (Mhonolink) – Zync Rmxd (Sweden) – November 2000
- "Midnight Magik" (Punisher) – Seismic (US) – March 2001
- "Optical Way" (Rino Cerrone) – Iturnem/Relentless (Canada) – January 2002
- "Torso" (Vintage) – X–Trax (Netherlands) – June 2002
- "Yul Fuka" (Yaz, Miko and Preach) – Iturnem/Relentless (Canada) – November 2002
- "Dogzilla" (Simon Patterson & Richie Kayvan) – Maelstrom (England) – August 2003
- "No War in the Summer" (DJ Preach) (Barbara Brown Remix) – Iturnem (Canada) – September 2003
- "Chances" (DJ Hansz) – Body & Artform (Netherlands) – December 2003
- "Aurelon" (Vince Watson) – Bio (Scotland) – June 2004
- "Julian" (Olivier Klitzing) – Headline (Germany) – March 2005
- "Work It!" (Ignition Technician) – Notorious North (England) – April 2005
- "No Works of Words" (T21) – Productions Spéciales (France) – June 2006
- "We Know You Know It" (Foreign Islands) – Deaf Dumb and Blind (US) – November 2006
- "One Eye on the Strawberries" (Pheek) – Iturnem (Canada) – November 2007
- "Club Thing" (Yoav) – Island Records (England) – August 2008
- "Love at the End of the World" (Sam Roberts) – Universal (Canada) / Rounder Records (England) – September 2008
- "2nd to None" (Umek) – Rekluse (England) – May 2010
- "Quinchos" (Llydo) – Dilek (Switzerland) – November 2010
- "Phénix" (Alfa Rococo) – Tacca (Canada) – November 2012
- "Deux Ils Deux Elles" (Lara Fabian) – Musicor (Canada) – September 2013
- "Frog Pond" (Giorgos Gatzigristos) – Tulipa (US) – August 2014
- "Sewers" (The YellowHeads) – Reload Black (Spain) – December 2015
- "Vortex" (Spartaque) – Tulipa (US) – June 2016
- "Mute" (BenMen) – Electropical (France) – March 2018
- "Rouge à Lèvres" (Mehdi Bahmad) – Renaissance (Canada) – Apr 2019

=== Compilations ===
- Relentless Beats Vol. 1 – Moonshine (US) – Feb 2001
- MB01 – Trust the DJ (England) – Dec 2001
- Relentless Beats Vol. 2 – Moonshine (US) – Feb 2002
- MB02 – Trust the DJ (England) – Nov 2002
- White Is Pure 2 (by Barbara Brown) – Aria (Canada) – Mar 2003
- Iturnem in Pink – Florida 135 (Spain) – Jan 2004
- Come With Me… – UWE (France) – Feb 2006

=== Awards and nominations ===
Year	Award	Nominated work	Result
2002	SODRAC Prize (MIMI Awards)	—N/a	Won
2002	UK Underground Dance Music Awards for Best Breakthrough DJ	—N/a	Won
2009	GAMIQ Award (Quebec Indie Music Award) for Best Electro Album of the Year	I'm No Human	Nominated
2010	Juno Award for Best Dance Recording of the Year	I'm No Human	Nominated
2013	ADISQ Award for Best Show in "Other" Language	Many Shades of Grey	Nominated
2014	MTL Award for Best Montreal DJ	—N/a	Won

== See also ==
- List of Quebec musicians
- List of Quebec record labels
- Music of Quebec
- Culture of Quebec
- Disc jockey
- List of Italian Canadians
