= Nancy D. Griffeth =

American computer scientist and mathematician

Nancy Davis Griffeth
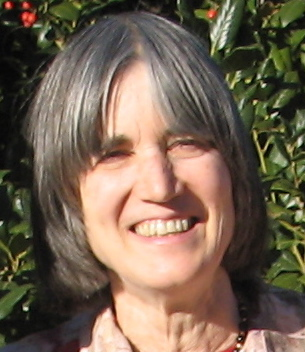
- Born: October 26, 1945 (age 80); Oak Park, Illinois
- Citizenship: United States
- Education: Harvard University, Michigan State, (masters), University of Chicago, Ph.D.
- Known for: Network systems
- Children: Valerie Griffeth; Stephen Griffeth
- Awards: Top 100 Women in Computing from McGraw-Hill (1995); Cisco Systems Award (2007, 2008)
- Scientific career
- Fields: Computer Science
- Workplaces: Lehman College

Nancy Davis Griffeth (born October 26, 1945) is an American computer scientist notable for approaches to the feature interaction problem. In 2014, she is a professor at Lehman College of The City University of New York and is modelling biological systems in computational biology.

== Early life ==
Griffeth was born in Oak Park, Illinois and lived in Laurel, Mississippi and Memphis, Tennessee as a child. She received a bachelor's degree from Harvard University, a master's degree from Michigan State University, and a PhD degree from the University of Chicago.

== Career ==
Griffeth did seminal work in the feature interaction problem as a founding organizer of the feature interaction workshops and co-author of one of the most cited papers in feature interactions, "A Feature Interaction Benchmark for IN and Beyond." The feature interaction problem is a software problem that arises when one feature interacts with another in such a way that it changes what the feature does. This can cause serious issues for developers and users of the software. The problem was first documented as features were added to telecommunications systems. If new features on a telecommunications network were either undetected or unwanted, they could cause confusion and dissatisfaction among customers if not handled properly.

Griffeth also researched the related problem of how to test networks to see how well they work together, called "interoperability". She worked at the Next Generation Networking Lab at Lucent Technologies where she designed and built tools to test interoperability of Voice-over-IP networks, which included conformance testing for MeGaCo media gateways and controllers. For this purpose, she also researched how to model protocols.

In addition, she studied virtual node layers regarding Mobile Ad Hoc Networks or MANETs. In the 1990s, she patented methods to protect databases against hackers trying to deduce confidential attributes. Her research has included distributed databases, simulations, concurrency and recovery controls, database design issues, performance modeling, and other issues.

== Teaching ==
From 2010 to 2014 Griffeth directed workshops on computational biology, funded by the National Science Foundation Expedition in Computing "Computational Modeling and Analysis of Complex Systems." Seventy-eight undergraduate students were trained in computational biology methods and tools and executed research projects on atrial fibrillation and pancreatic cancer.

== Awards ==
Griffeth received the Top 100 Women in Computing award from McGraw-Hill in 1995 for her work in feature interactions in telecommunications systems, distributed systems, and databases. She received awards in 2007 and 2008 from Cisco Systems for work on ad hoc networks.

== Personal life ==
Griffeth married engineer and author Bill Griffeth and is the mother of American rugby athlete Valerie Griffeth, and the professor of mathematics at Chile's University of Talca, Dr. Stephen Griffeth.
