= George Nemeth =

Hungarian-Canadian psychologist and poet (1933–2009)

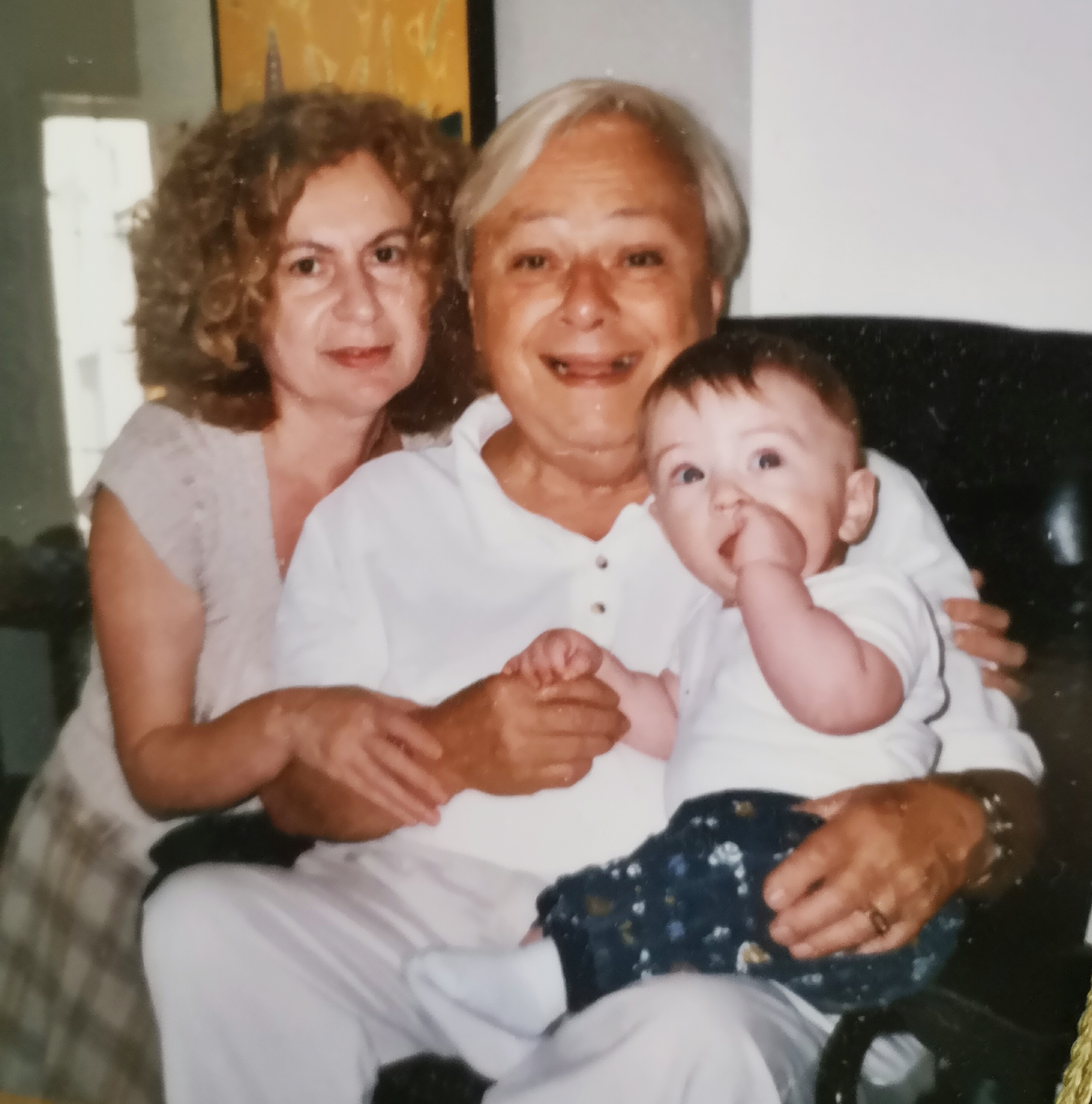
- Nemeth (centre) and Mary Melfi (left) with Nemeth's grandson, c. 2007
- Born: April 10, 1933; Budapest, Kingdom of Hungary
- Died: October 2, 2009 (aged 76); Montreal, Quebec, Canada
- Occupations: Psychologist; poet; writer
- Known for: Co-founding the Arkánum Magazine
- Spouse: Mary Melfi (m. 1975)

George Nemeth (April 10, 1933 – October 2, 2009) was a Hungarian Canadian psychologist, avant-garde trend poet, and writer.

== Biography ==
Nemeth was born in 1933, and grew up under Mátyás Rákosi's socialist regime. After the Hungarian Revolution of 1956, Nemeth fled Hungary, and settled in Canada. In 1957, Nemeth got his PhD in psychology from McGill University and taught psychology at Concordia University.

Nemeth began his poetic career in the 1960s. In 1981, he co-founded the Arkánum Magazine, which he also co-edited with Sándor András, Jószef Bakucz, and László Kemenes Géfin. He died in 2009 in Montreal.
