= Ben Viccari =

Canadian journalist (1918–2010)

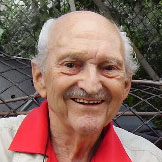

Ben Viccari (1918–2010) was a writer, journalist, broadcaster and champion of Canadian multiculturalism. He was a past president of the Canadian Ethnic Media Association (CEMA). He also published the online blog and news service, Canscene: Canada's multicultural scene. Ben's commentaries have been featured regularly on OMNI Television. He also started Losode.com, a web site for low sodium dieters.

== Biography ==
Viccari was born in England in 1918, son of an Italian immigrant father and English mother. Thus, his very beginnings were multicultural. Even at over 90 years of age, Viccari continued to serve his community, acting as a bridge between Canada's diverse cultural groups.

He began his career as a writer in England and served in Britain's Royal Artillery in Europe during the Second World War. After the fall of Benito Mussolini, he joined the Military Mission to the Italian Army (Allied Control Commission). Viccari moved to Canada in 1947 and was successful in the fields of public relations, broadcasting and print communications, notably:

• Publishing Oggi Canada (Italian weekly)
• As president of the Canadian Public Relations Society (Toronto) Inc. (1960-1961)
• Lecturing at Harvard School of Business, the University of Toronto, Wilfrid Laurier University and Humber College
• Serving as chair of public relations for Villa Colombo (Italian home for the aged)
• Establishing his own public relations firm
• Serving as president of the Toronto Press Club (1981-82)

From 1986 to 2000, he was managing editor of Canadian Scene, the non-profit, multilingual news and information service for Canada's ethnic media, which has now ceased publication.

The closure of Canadian Scene prompted Viccari to launch his blog, Canscene, publishing multicultural news articles, updated monthly. Ethnic media are encouraged to pick up and reproduce, free of charge, any article that is of interest.

In 2005, Viccari worked with executive producer Lalita Krishna to create the television documentary The Third Element, chronicling the growth of ethnic media in Canada from the 19th century to the present. Ben appeared as host in the documentary, also writing its script and assisting with editing.

The Third Element was produced in English and Italian versions. Both have been aired several times on Omni TV.

Lalita and Viccari have completed a second documentary, The M Word, tracing the progress of multiculturalism in Canada from its introduction as a national policy to current controversy and the way ahead. The documentary aired for the first time, in English, on OMNI.1 Television, Saturday, December 1, 2007.

In 2009, Viccari launched a web site called Losode.com, a non-profit information exchange for low sodium dieters. He posts his own discoveries about low sodium products and recipes, and those of others who submit information. Comments are moderated, to conform with standards of Canadian and U.S. medical professions.

In 2010, the documentary film "I Have A Little Sugar" premiered on OMNI Television. Lalita Krishna produced the film, which explores the impact of diabetes, and in particular ethnic groups' exposure to the condition. English and Tamil language versions were produced.

Ben Viccari died at the age of 91, at St. Michael's Hospital, Toronto, on May 6, 2010.

== Awards ==
• Canadian Association of Broadcasters' (CAB) Gold Ribbon Award - 1st Place - Diversity Category for The M Word (2008)
• Sierhey Zhmara Ziniak Award for Leadership in Multilingual Journalism (1996)
• Ethnic Journalists' and Writers' Club Annual Award (1989)
• Medal from the Rakoczi Foundation (Hungarian culture society)
• CPRS National Award of Attainment, (1971)

== Family ==
Viccari married his wife Anne in 1967. Their children, grandchildren and great grandchildren share in diverse Canadian, Italian, British, Dutch, Ukrainian, Mexican-Irish and German heritages.

== Avocations ==
A lifelong film buff and author of screenplays himself, Viccari supplements Canscene's news content with reviews of films; especially during the Toronto International Film Festival. In 2006, he attended 26 showings and reviewed 11 of them for the Canscene blog.

Viccari is an avid reader, frequently reviewing books on Canscene.

He is knowledgeable fan of opera and has contributed reviews to the magazine Performance Arts & Entertainment in Canada.
