= Fabrizio Divari =

Italian tattoo artist (born 1972)

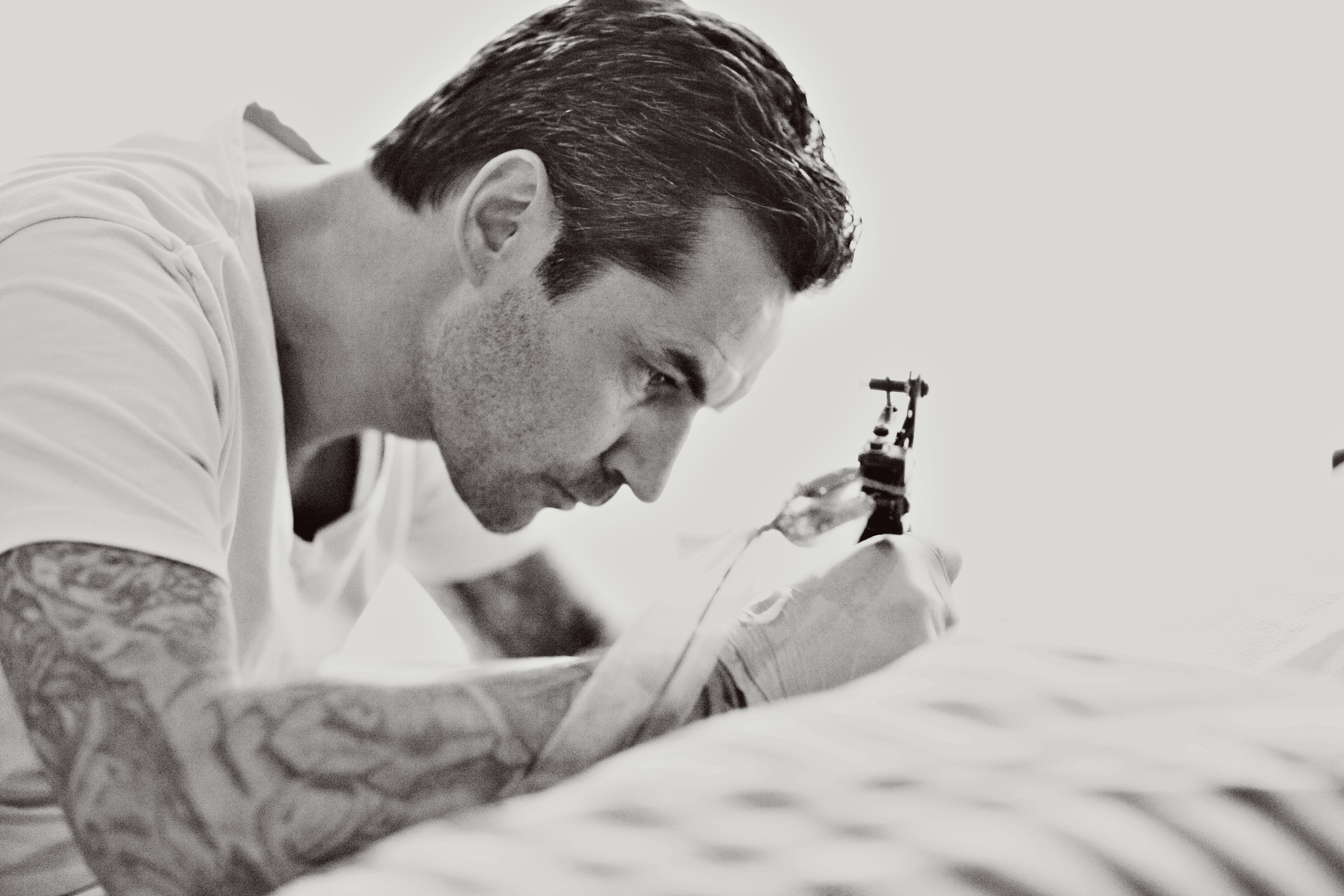
- Fabrizio Divari at work
- Born: 1972; Milan, Italy
- Occupation: Tattoo artist
- Website: fabriziodivari.com

Fabrizio Divari (born 1972) is a tattoo artist from Milan, Italy. Divari was born in Rome before moving to Milan, where he spent most of his childhood. He later moved to Toronto, Canada, where he owned and operated an award-winning and well-established tattoo studio for 14 years before establishing himself in Menorca, Spain, where he currently owns his latest tattoo shop, la Malapulga.

== Early life ==
A formally trained painter, Fabrizio Divari began his career studying at Milan's Accademia di Belli Arti di Brera, where he developed interest for cubism and modern art. Fascinated with art since childhood, Divari started painting canvases in the early 90s at 16 years old.

As a teenager, Divari experimented with tattoos by building his own machines, tattooing both himself and his friends. His professional career started in 1998 when he opened his own studio in Milan, paid for his work by a growing clientele.

== World travels ==
Shortly after, he moved to Costa Rica where he opened a studio on the coast, commuting on weekends to work in a San Jose tattoo shop. A self-proclaimed nomad, Divari spent a year working in Miami before moving to New York. He worked for Sacred Tattoo in Manhattan and Flyrite Tattoo in Brooklyn, garnering a strong clientele and following.

In 2002, Divari moved to Canada where he worked at various studios in Toronto. His held his longest position working at New Tribe Tattoo in the city's trendy Queen West neighbourhood for three years. With longtime plans of opening his own shop, Divari finally settled in Parkdale, an up-and-coming area in Toronto's west end.

== Fabrizio Divari Tattoos ==
Fabrizio Divari Tattoos, opened in 2005, has focused on Cubism and Asian, amongst an array of modern styles. Divari is also heavily inspired by mother nature, with interest in illustrations of birds, flowers and animals, which reflect his studies in art history from his formal training.

== Cubism inspiration and artistic focus ==
Divari's two main inspirations are Salvador Dalí and Pablo Picasso. He feels that in these styles, "everything can be simplified to geometric shapes". This strong cubism influence was developed during his time of study at the Accademia di Belli Arti and a reflection of his early childhood scribbles.

Today, Divari pushes towards images more organic than abstract when working on Asian and Cubist pieces. He applies his personal skills and style to the popularity of Asian art by contrast in use of colour, detail and flow.

== Awards and press ==
Fabrizio Divari was named Best Tattoo Artist in Now Magazine's Best of Toronto in 2010 and 2011.

In addition to being featured in Toronto's alternative weekly newspaper, Now Magazine, Divari has been on the cover of Skin Deep Magazine. He has been featured in issues of Scandinavian Tattoo Magazine, International Tattoo Art, BME, Eye Weekly and Italian Canadian cultural magazine, Panoram Italia.

== Books ==
Divari and his works have been featured in:

- Animal Ink: Exploring the World's Wildlife Through Tattoo Art, edited by Mike Devries and Jinxi Caddel (2012)
- Inside The Tattoo Circus: A Journey Through The Modern World of Tattoos, by Kristian Misser (2009)
- Scratch Art, edited by Guy Aitchison (2008)
