= Marco Scandella =

Canadian ice hockey player (born 1990)

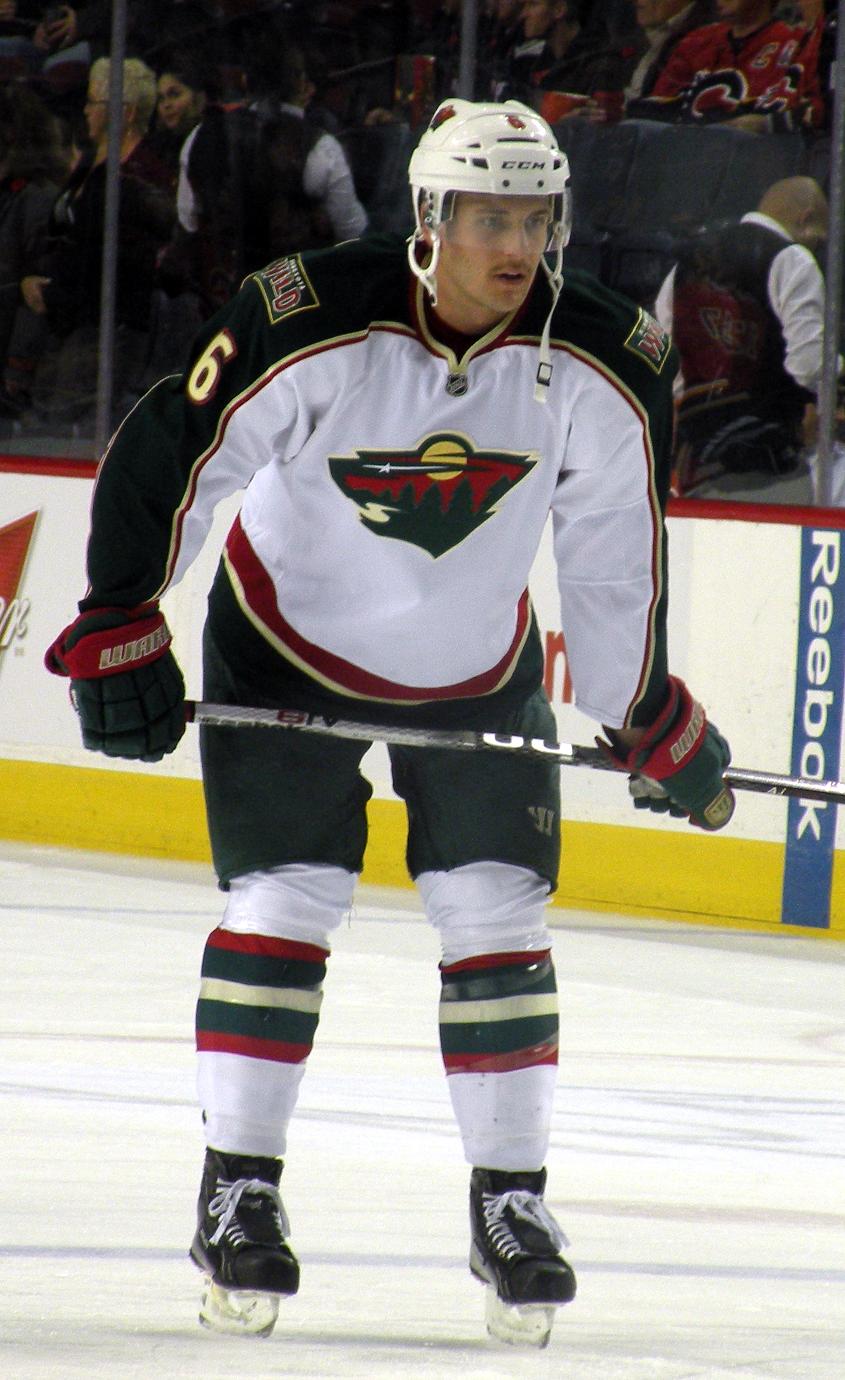
- Scandella with the Minnesota Wild in 2011
- Born: February 23, 1990 (age 36) Montreal, Quebec, Canada
- Height: 6 ft 3 in (191 cm)
- Weight: 208 lb (94 kg; 14 st 12 lb)
- Position: Defence
- Shot: Left
- Played for: Minnesota Wild; Buffalo Sabres; Montreal Canadiens; St. Louis Blues
- NHL draft: 55th overall, 2008; Minnesota Wild
- Playing career: 2009–2024

Marco Scandella (born February 23, 1990) is an Italian-Canadian former professional ice hockey defenceman who played 14 seasons in the National Hockey League (NHL) for the Minnesota Wild, Buffalo Sabres, Montreal Canadiens, and St. Louis Blues. Scandella played major junior hockey in the Quebec Major Junior Hockey League (QMJHL) for the Val d'Or Foreurs prior to being selected by the Wild in the second-round, 55th overall, in the 2008 NHL entry draft.

== Playing career ==
=== Amateur ===
Scandella began his junior career with the Val d'Or Foreurs of the QMJHL. Shortly after returning from the 2010 World Junior Championships tournament, Scandella was suspended for 15 games by the QMJHL for elbowing Alexandre Durette of the Rimouski Océanic in the head.

=== Professional ===
==== Minnesota Wild ====
Scandella made his NHL debut for the Minnesota Wild on November 12, 2010, against the Florida Panthers. He scored his first career NHL goal during the first game of the 2011–12 season against Steve Mason of the Columbus Blue Jackets.

Scandella began his breakout year in the 2013–14 season, skating in 76 games with the Wild and playing the majority of his minutes on the second defensive pairing with close friend Jared Spurgeon. He scored three goals and added 14 assists for 17 points over the course of the season.

There were high expectations for Scandella entering the 2014–15 season. He immediately made an impact, going on a scoring streak and surpassing his career totals of goals scored. He scored the overtime winners against the Winnipeg Jets and Dallas Stars on November 14 and November 29, and on the latter date signed a five-year, $20 million contract extension with Minnesota. Scandella was later fined $2,755.38 for an illegal check to the head of the St. Louis Blues' T. J. Oshie on December 1, and nine days later, he was suspended a further two games for the same infraction against the New York Islanders' Brock Nelson.

==== Buffalo Sabres ====
After seven seasons with Minnesota, Scandella (alongside Jason Pominville and a 2018 fourth-round pick) was traded to the Buffalo Sabres on June 30, 2017 in exchange for Tyler Ennis, Marcus Foligno and a third-round pick.

==== Montreal Canadiens ====
Entering the final year of his contract in the 2019–20 season, Scandella contributed with three goals and nine points in 31 games. On January 3, 2020, Scandella was traded to the Montreal Canadiens in exchange for a 2020 fourth-round pick. He scored his first goal for the Canadiens on February 8 in a 2–1 overtime win against the Toronto Maple Leafs.

==== St. Louis Blues ====
On February 18, 2020, Scandella, after only one month with the Canadiens, was traded on to the St. Louis Blues in exchange for a 2020 second-round pick and 2021 conditional fourth-round pick. Scandella made 11 regular season appearances with the Blues, registering 1 assist, before the season was suspended due to the coronavirus pandemic.

On April 16, 2020, the Blues signed Scandella as an impending free agent to a four-year, $13.1 million contract extension.

After going unsigned during the 2024 offseason, Scandella confirmed his retirement from professional hockey on October 27, 2024.

== International play ==
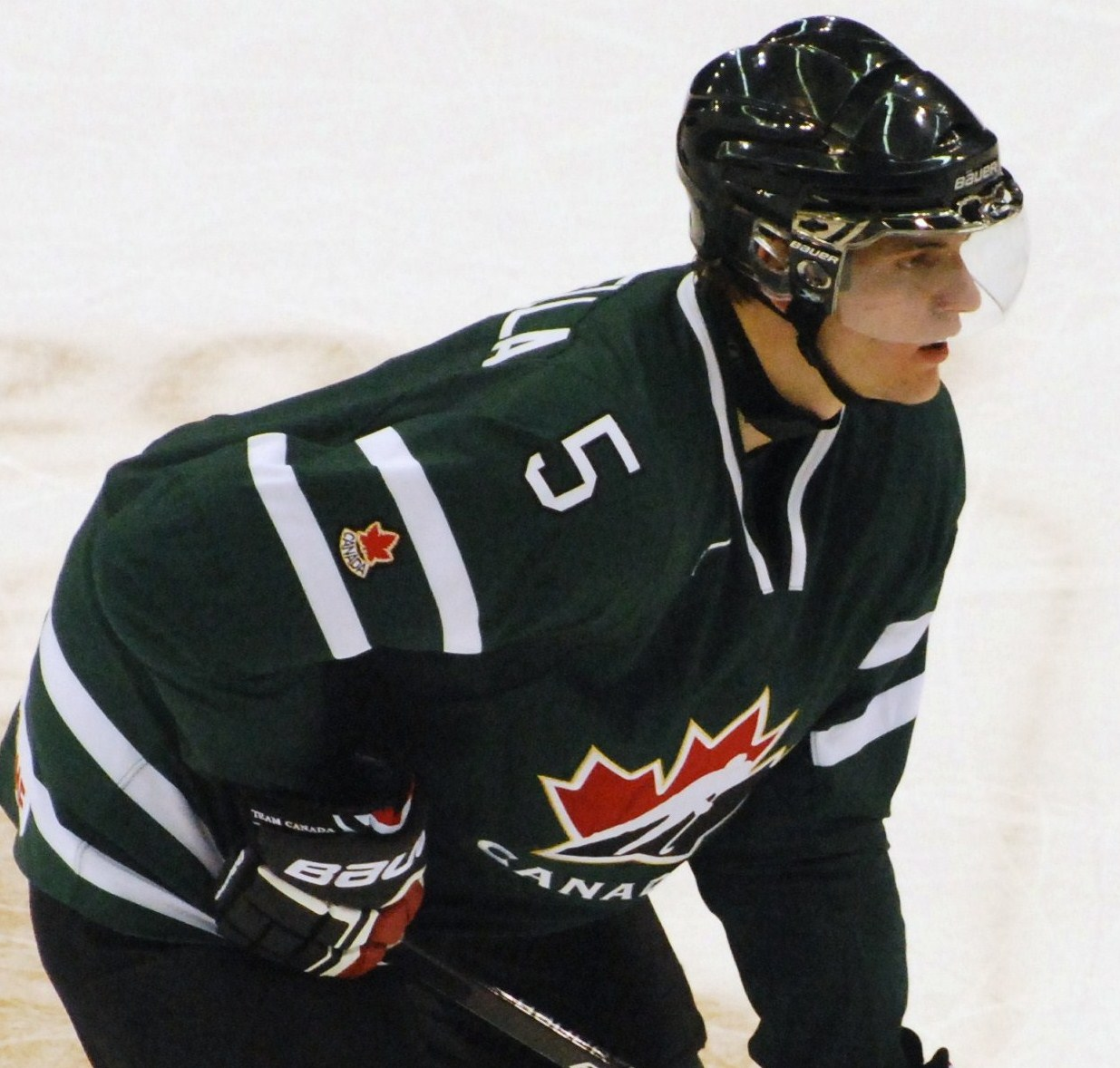
- Scandella at the 2010 World Junior Championship

Medal record

Representing Canada

Ice hockey

World Junior Championships
Silver medal – second place	2010 Saskatchewan	

World U18 Championships
Gold medal – first place	2008 Kazan	

Scandella represented Canada internationally for the first time at the 2008 World Under-18 Championships, helping his country to a gold medal and recording one goal and one assist in seven games. He also represented Canada at the 2010 World Junior Championships, helping the team to a silver medal and recording one goal and two assists in six games.

== Personal life ==
Scandella is the nephew of former NHLer Sergio Momesso. Marco's older brother, Giulio Scandella, played professional hockey in Italy and was a member of the Italian national team with whom he appeared at the 2006 Winter Olympics. Scandella's father, Francesco, is an Italian immigrant, and Marco is trilingual, speaking English, French and Italian.

== Career statistics ==
=== Regular season and playoffs ===
			Regular season					Playoffs
Season	Team	League	GP	G	A	Pts	PIM	GP	G	A	Pts	PIM
2005–06	Cégep Édouard-Montpetit	QMAAA	42	3	4	7	40	3	0	0	0	2
2006–07	Montréal Prédateurs	QMAAA	42	7	13	20	66	3	0	1	1	10
2007–08	Val-d'Or Foreurs	QMJHL	65	4	10	14	35	4	0	1	1	4
2008–09	Val-d'Or Foreurs	QMJHL	58	10	27	37	64	—	—	—	—	—
2008–09	Houston Aeros	AHL	2	0	0	0	0	6	0	0	0	2
2009–10	Val-d'Or Foreurs	QMJHL	31	9	22	31	41	6	2	4	6	4
2009–10	Houston Aeros	AHL	7	0	1	1	7	—	—	—	—	—
2010–11	Houston Aeros	AHL	33	3	16	19	17	20	2	6	8	8
2010–11	Minnesota Wild	NHL	20	0	2	2	2	—	—	—	—	—
2011–12	Minnesota Wild	NHL	63	3	9	12	19	—	—	—	—	—
2011–12	Houston Aeros	AHL	9	2	3	5	4	—	—	—	—	—
2012–13	Houston Aeros	AHL	45	2	15	17	23	2	1	0	1	2
2012–13	Minnesota Wild	NHL	6	1	0	1	4	5	1	1	2	0
2013–14	Minnesota Wild	NHL	76	3	14	17	20	13	2	1	3	0
2014–15	Minnesota Wild	NHL	64	11	12	23	56	10	2	1	3	0
2015–16	Minnesota Wild	NHL	73	5	16	21	22	6	1	0	1	4
2016–17	Minnesota Wild	NHL	71	4	9	13	25	5	0	0	0	2
2017–18	Buffalo Sabres	NHL	82	5	17	22	37	—	—	—	—	—
2018–19	Buffalo Sabres	NHL	63	6	7	13	26	—	—	—	—	—
2019–20	Buffalo Sabres	NHL	31	3	6	9	8	—	—	—	—	—
2019–20	Montreal Canadiens	NHL	20	1	2	3	8	—	—	—	—	—
2019–20	St. Louis Blues	NHL	11	0	1	1	4	9	0	0	0	0
2020–21	St. Louis Blues	NHL	49	3	6	9	24	4	0	0	0	0
2021–22	St. Louis Blues	NHL	70	3	11	14	18	4	0	0	0	0
2022–23	St. Louis Blues	NHL	20	1	1	2	6	—	—	—	—	—
2023–24	St. Louis Blues	NHL	65	2	6	8	15	—	—	—	—	—
NHL totals			784	51	119	170	294	56	6	3	9	6

=== International ===
Year	Team	Event	Result	GP	G	A	Pts	PIM
2008	Canada	U18	1st place, gold medalist(s)	7	1	1	2	6
2010	Canada	WJC	2nd place, silver medalist(s)	6	1	2	3	2
Junior totals				13	2	3	5	8
