= Gustavo Bounous =

Canadian physician

Gustavo Bounous was a research medical doctor.

He was born in Luserna, Italy on July 10, 1928. He was educated at the University of Turin and at the University of Genoa. Then, he worked as a research fellow in surgery at the Indiana Medical Center. In 1963 he moved to Canada. He became a professor of surgery, successively at the Université de Sherbrooke, 1973–1985, after that, at McGill University, 1985–1993. He died at the age of 83 on December 29, 2011.

== Research development ==
In 1978 he began research at McGill on a dietary protein source that would boost immune system performance. Bounous contends that a deficiency in the protein glutathione is linked to several diseases, and that a lack of innate cysteine that inhibits glutathione production.

Cysteine-Rich Protein Reverses Weight Loss in Lung Cancer Patients Receiving Chemotherapy or Radiotherapy Molecular pathogenesis and prevention of prostate cancer. Whey protein concentrate (WPC) and glutathione modulation in cancer treatment. The use of a whey protein concentrate in the treatment of patients with metastatic carcinoma: a phase I-II clinical study. Competition for glutathione precursors between the immune system and the skeletal muscle: pathogenesis of chronic fatigue syndrome.

== Selected publications ==
- Bounous, G; Molson, JH (2003). "The antioxidant system". Anticancer Research. 23 (2B): 1411–5. PMID 12820403.
- Kennedy, RS; Konok, GP; Bounous, G; Baruchel, S; Lee, TD (1995). "The use of a whey protein concentrate in the treatment of patients with metastatic carcinoma: A phase I-II clinical study". Anticancer Research. 15 (6B): 2643–9. PMID 8669840.
- Bounous, Gustavo; Somersall, Allan (April 1999). Breakthrough In Cell-Defense. GOLDENeight Publishing. ISBN 978-1-890412-86-9.
