= Giulio Scandella =

Canadian-born Italian ice hockey player

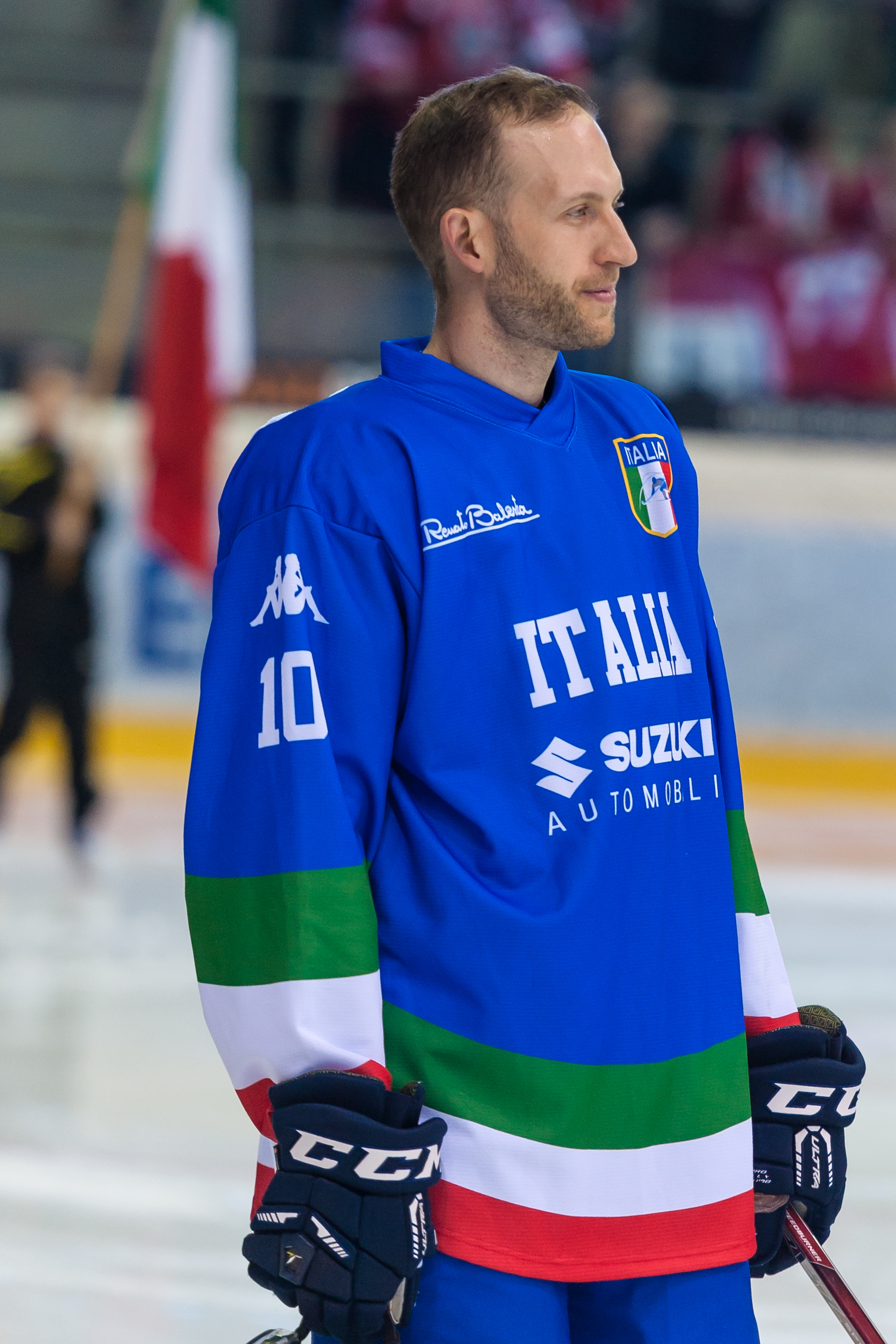
- Born: September 18, 1983 (age 42) Montreal, Quebec, Canada
- Height: 6 ft 1 in (185 cm)
- Weight: 183 lb (83 kg; 13 st 1 lb)
- Position: Left wing
- Shot: Left
- Played for: HC Asiago; Augsburger Panther; HC Milano; Ritten Sport; Rögle BK; HC Bolzano; HC Ajoie; IK Oskarshamn; HC Pustertal Wölfe
- National team: Italy
- NHL draft: Undrafted
- Playing career: 2004–2019

Giulio Scandella (born September 18, 1983) is an Italian-Canadian former professional ice hockey player.

== International ==
Scandella participated at the 2010 IIHF World Championship as a member of the Italian National men's ice hockey team.

He was named to the Italy national ice hockey team for competition at the 2014 IIHF World Championship.

== Personal life ==
Scandella is the older brother of retired NHL defenceman Marco Scandella. He is also the nephew of former NHL player Sergio Momesso. Scandella's father, Francesco, is an Italian immigrant.

== Career statistics ==
=== Regular season and playoffs ===
			Regular season					Playoffs
Season	Team	League	GP	G	A	Pts	PIM	GP	G	A	Pts	PIM
1999–2000	Montreal Canadiens AAA	QMAAA	41	12	31	43	57	—	—	—	—	—
2000–01	Halifax Mooseheads	QMJHL	69	7	23	30	59	5	0	0	0	0
2001–02	Halifax Mooseheads	QMJHL	67	10	15	25	79	10	0	4	4	2
2002–03	Rouyn–Noranda Huskies	QMJHL	59	29	37	66	85	4	3	0	3	6
2003–04	Rouyn–Noranda Huskies	QMJHL	36	19	33	52	33	—	—	—	—	—
2003–04	HC Asiago	ITA	16	9	3	12	12	12	5	3	8	22
2004–05	HC Asiago	ITA	34	16	16	32	34	7	0	2	2	16
2005–06	HC Asiago	ITA	37	18	15	33	59	—	—	—	—	—
2006–07	Augsburger Panther	DEL	19	2	4	6	22	—	—	—	—	—
2006–07	Milano Vipers	ITA	16	6	7	13	30	8	3	1	4	24
2007–08	Milano Vipers	ITA	38	21	30	51	22	9	5	7	12	8
2008–09	Ritten Sport	ITA	33	26	32	58	20	9	7	2	9	10
2009–10	Rögle BK	SEL	11	1	3	4	6	—	—	—	—	—
2010–11	HC Ajoie	SUI.2	8	3	6	9	6	—	—	—	—	—
2010–11	HC Bolzano	ITA	16	10	14	24	24	10	4	4	8	14
2011–12	HC Pustertal Wölfe	ITA	37	26	39	65	44	13	7	11	18	20
2012–13	IK Oskarshamn	Allsv	49	9	14	23	34	6	1	0	1	10
2013–14	HC Pustertal Wölfe	ITA	29	19	28	47	48	16	5	11	16	28
2014–15	HC Pustertal Wölfe	ITA	30	22	40	62	26	11	3	9	12	16
2015–16	HC Pustertal Wölfe	ITA	27	17	22	39	36	15	9	11	20	32
2016–17	HC Asiago	AlpsHL	32	16	27	43	42	13	10	2	12	20
2016–17	HC Asiago	ITA	2	0	1	1	4	—	—	—	—	—
2017–18	HC Asiago	AlpsHL	39	16	37	53	38	14	10	8	18	24
2017–18	HC Asiago	ITA	1	0	3	3	0	—	—	—	—	—
2018–19	Saint–Georges Cool FM 103.5	LNAH	21	12	7	19	16	—	—	—	—	—
2018–19	Les Pétroliers du Nord	LNAH	14	3	7	10	12	4	1	0	1	0
2019–20	Saint–Georges Cool FM 103.5	LNAH	7	1	2	3	0	—	—	—	—	—
ITA totals			316	190	250	440	359	110	48	61	109	190

=== International ===
Year	Team	Event	GP	G	A	Pts	PIM
2006	Italy	OG	2	0	1	1	0
2007	Italy	WC	6	0	1	1	2
2008	Italy	WC	5	0	2	2	2
2009	Italy	OGQ	3	2	2	4	2
2010	Italy	WC	6	2	1	3	2
2011	Italy	WC D1	4	4	2	6	4
2012	Italy	WC	7	1	2	3	10
2013	Italy	OGQ	3	0	2	2	0
2013	Italy	WC D1A	2	0	0	0	2
2014	Italy	WC	7	1	2	3	8
2016	Italy	WC D1A	5	1	2	3	8
2016	Italy	OGQ	3	1	0	1	2
2017	Italy	WC	7	0	2	2	4
2018	Italy	WC D1A	5	2	1	3	0
Senior totals			65	14	20	34	46
