= William Anselmi =

Italian-born academic and writer

William Anselmi (1958-2025) was an Italian-born Canadian academic and writer. His work focused on Italian poetry (neoavanguardia, sperimentalismo); Italian Canadian literature and culture; narratives of displacement; the body organic/technological; the Image vs. the Word; media: television, cinema, Italian alternative music; environments of technological communication.

== Academic life ==
Dr. Anselmi received an MA from Carleton University in 1983 and a PhD in Comparative Literature in 1992 from l'Université de Montréal, with a dissertation entitled Sperimentalismo e/o avanguardia poetiche pratiche del Gruppo 63. He then returned to Carleton University as an assistant professor, before coming to the University of Alberta, serving first as Associate Professor and then Professor of Italian and Italian-Canadian Literature and Culture.

=== Sopranos 101 ===
In the mid-2000s, Anselmi gave a series of televised lectures on The Sopranos as a cultural representation of Italian heritage in North America. The lectures aired after episodes of the series on Telelatino. In an interview for the National Post Anselmi states that:

The writers of The Sopranos use the Mafia as a cultural reference point to explore and critique the 'American Dream'. Whether intentional or not, however, there is an irony in this approach, as the characters and their stories are consistently devoid of those values which are core to the mythos in which Americans choose to locate themselves. Rather than showcasing an ideal - that shining city upon the hill - Tony's trials and tribulations reveal a shadow world, one that is more nightmare than dream, where ancient core beliefs and principles like loyalty, trust and friendship have become tainted and distorted 'family' values.

== Literary life ==
Dr. Anselmi's first story, 'The Joke of Eternal Returns', was published in the 1989 anthology, Ricordi: Things Remembered. In 2009, he published a travel narrative of Orvieto titled Orvieto: Urbs Vetus.

He also served as the president of the Association of Italian Canadian Writers from 1998 to 2000 and was the Canadian correspondent for Hebenon, an Italian language international journal of literature.

== Selected works ==
=== Books ===
- Orvieto Urbs Vetus. Toronto: Guernica Editions, 2009.
- Mary Melfi: Essays on Her Works. Guest Editor. Toronto: Guernica Editions, 2007.
- Happy slaves: a duologue on multicultural deficit with K. Gouliamos. Toronto: Guernica Editions, 2005.
- Elusive Margins: Consuming Media, Ethnicity, and Culture with K. Gouliamos. Toronto: Guernica Editions, 1998.
- Mediating Culture: The Politics of Representation with K. Gouliamos. Toronto: Guernica Editions, 1994.

=== Articles ===
- "Long Played revolutions: utopic narratives, canzoni d'autore." Ed.Ian Peddie, Popular Music and Human Rights. Volume II: World Music, Ashgate Press: Farnham (UK), forthcoming 2011.
- [w/S. Wilson]. "For Whom the post Tolls: Beyond technologies of Feminism: Postmortem of Transnational Communicative Environments." Editor Kostas Gouliamos, Journal of Critical Studies in Business & Society. European University Cyprus. 2010.
- [w/L. Hogan]. "Pinocchio: tracciato fra modernita', migrazione e tecnologia." ( Pinocchio: traced through modernity, migration and technology) Variazioni Pinocchio. 7 letture sulla riscrittura del mito. Editor Fabrizio Scrivano: Morlacchi Editore, Perugia, 2010.
- "Du 'transitionnisme'". Ed. F. Caccia, La transculture et ViceVersa.Tryptyque: Montreal, 2010.
- [w/S. Wilson]. "Performative Radicalism in contemporary Canadian documentary film." Sweden: Film International #37. Vol. 7, Issue 1 (February 2009).
- [w/S Wilson]. "Slumdogging it: rebranding the American Dream, New World Orders, Neo-colonialism." Sweden: Film International, May 2009. http://www.filmint.nu/?q=node/149
- [w/S Wilson]. "From Inch'Allah Dimanche to Sharia in Canada: Empire Management, Gender Representations, and Communication Strategies in the 21st Century." From Solidarity to Schisms. Ed. Cara Cilano. Amsterdam: Rodopi B.V., 2009.
- [w/L. Hogan] . "Tesi sull'etnia, il capitale umano e l'emigrazione italiana in Canada nell'era globale", in Emigrazione Notizie (FILEF), Materiali, September 2007.
- "Italian Canadian as displacement poetics: context, history, and literary production." Studi Emigrazione/Migration Studies – International journal of migration studies, Volume XLIV N. 166 (April–June 2007).
- "Absenting Community, I-Can Institutions – the Wopization of (Historical) Subjectivities as Re(dis)placed Decultured Being." Italian Canadiana, Volume 20, (2006).
- [w/L. Hogan], "L'emigrazione italiana in Canada nell'era globale tra aspetti culturali e risvolti economici." (The Italian emigration in Canada in the global era between cultural aspects and economic fall-outs). Memoria e Ricerca, Fascicolo 18, (2005).
- "Ars Bellica, or How Spielberg read Pinocchio to Benigni in the Land of the Free". Quaderni d'Italianistica, Special Edition on Pinocchio and Children's Literature. Vol. XXV, no. 1, (2004).
