= Sergio Momesso =

Canadian ice hockey player

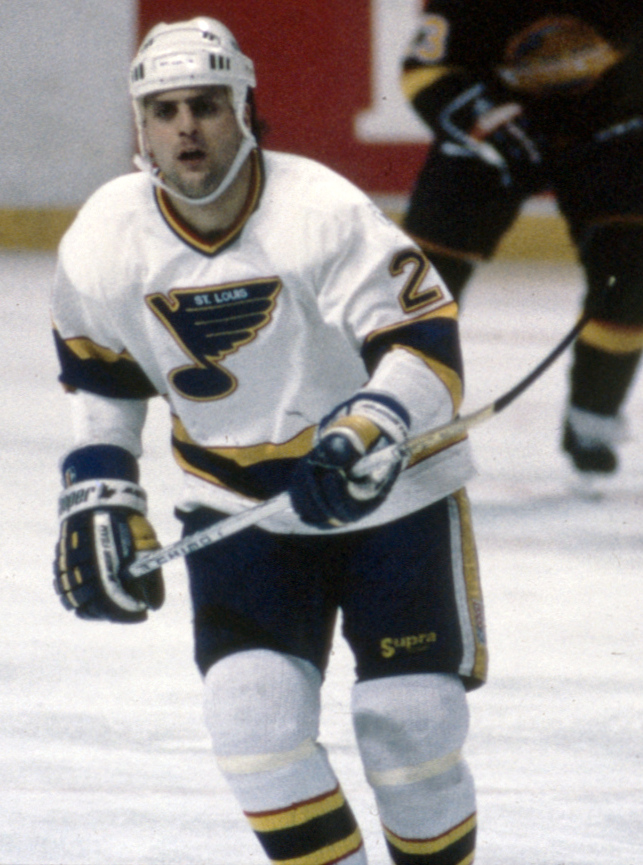
- Momesso with the St. Louis Blues in 1990
- Born: September 4, 1965 (age 61) Montreal, Quebec, Canada
- Height: 6 ft 3 in (191 cm)
- Weight: 215 lb (98 kg; 15 st 5 lb)
- Position: Left wing
- Shot: Left
- Played for: Montreal Canadiens; Vancouver Canucks; Toronto Maple Leafs; New York Rangers; St Louis Blues; Nürnberg Ice Tigers; Kölner Haie
- NHL draft: 27th overall, 1983; Montreal Canadiens
- Playing career: 1983–2001

Sergio Francesco Momesso (born September 4, 1965) is an Italian-Canadian former professional ice hockey player who spent 13 seasons in the National Hockey League (NHL) between 1983 and 1997.

== Playing career ==
Momesso played his junior hockey for the Shawinigan Cataractes of the QMJHL, and was drafted 27th overall in the 1983 NHL entry draft by his hometown Montreal Canadiens. He made his NHL debut the following season at the age of 18, playing a single game for the Canadiens, but remained in junior for most of the following two seasons. In 1984–85, he recorded 56 goals and 146 points in 64 games, along with 216 penalty minutes, and was named QMJHL Player of the Year.

=== Montreal Canadiens and St. Louis Blues ===
For the 1985–86 NHL season, Momesso made the Canadiens' roster out of training camp and meshed well on a line with Brian Skrudland and Mike McPhee, recording 8 goals and 15 points in his first 24 games to start his career. However, he suffered a knee injury in December 1985 against the Boston Bruins that shelved him for the rest of the season; it also cost him an opportunity to have his name engraved on the Stanley Cup, as Montreal would win the championship that season. The Canadiens still include Momesso in the 1986 championship team picture, and gave him a Stanley Cup ring. Momesso would spend two more seasons in Montreal but never recaptured the form of his rookie year. After the 1987–88 season, the Canadiens traded him to the St. Louis Blues along with goaltender Vincent Riendeau for Jocelyn Lemieux, Darrell May, and a second-round draft pick in 1989 (which Montreal used to select Patrice Brisebois).

After his first season in St. Louis, during which he recorded 26 points in 53 games, Momesso's career took an upward turn in 1989–90 when he was placed on a line with Brett Hull and Adam Oates. Spending much of the season on the Blues' top line, Momesso turned in the most productive year of his career, finishing with 24 goals and 32 assists for 56 points, along with 199 penalty minutes. However, he would lose his spot on the top line in 1990–91, and recorded just 10 goals through his first 59 appearances.

=== Vancouver Canucks ===
At the trade deadline in 1991, the Blues dealt Momesso to the Vancouver Canucks in a six-player deal along with Geoff Courtnall, Cliff Ronning, and Robert Dirk in exchange for Garth Butcher and Dan Quinn. The trade would turn out to favour Vancouver, as all four players they acquired would be significant contributors for several seasons. Momesso got his Canuck career off to a fine start, recording 6 goals in 11 games to help the team on a successful late-season push to qualify for the playoffs.

Momesso's stay in Vancouver would be the longest stop of his career. Through his first two seasons with the Canucks, he largely played on a line with Jim Sandlak and former St. Louis teammate Cliff Ronning, with the two large wingers, Sandlak and Momesso, used to create space for centre Ronning. As a result, the line would be known as "the Twin Towers." In 1991–92, he played some of the best hockey of his career, finishing with 20 goals and 43 points despite missing 26 games due to injury. In 1992–93, he had another solid year with 18 goals and 38 points, as well as a career-high 200 penalty minutes.

1993–94 would be a struggle for Momesso, as he finished with just 27 points, his lowest total since 1989. However, he redeemed himself in the 1994 playoffs, as his strong physical play on a line with Martin Gelinas and Nathan LaFayette was one of the catalysts for Vancouver's run to the Stanley Cup Final. Along the way, he scored an overtime winner in the second round of the playoffs against the Dallas Stars.

=== After Vancouver ===
After a solid performance during the lockout-shortened 1994–95 season with 25 points in 48 games, Momesso was dealt to the Toronto Maple Leafs for Mike Ridley. He never found his legs in Toronto and was dealt after only 54 games to the New York Rangers, finishing the season with 11 goals and 23 points in 73 games. In 1996–97, he was dealt mid-season back to the St. Louis Blues, and finished the year with 1 goal and 4 points in 40 games.

Unable to get another NHL contract, Momesso signed with Kölner Haie in Germany and enjoyed four successful seasons in the DEL before retiring in 2001. He finished his NHL career with totals of 152 goals and 193 assists for 345 points in 710 games, along with 1557 penalty minutes. He never missed the NHL playoffs in his career, and recorded 18 goals and 26 assists for 44 points in 119 postseason games.

He returned to North America to act as an assistant coach at Concordia University and for Shawinigan. Momesso's family owns a restaurant in Montreal's Notre-Dame-de-Grâce district and Sergio has opened his own restaurant, Cafe Momesso.

On September 16, 2010, it was announced that Momesso would join the broadcast team with CJAD radio as colour commentator and game analyst for Montreal Canadiens broadcasts.

Momesso is now an analyst with TSN690 and regularly joins Off the Cuff with Chris Nilan on a weekly basis.

== Personal life ==
Momesso's Italian-born father, Alessandro was an all-star soccer player in Montreal. Two of Momesso's nephews, Marco and Giulio Scandella, were professional ice hockey players.

== Career statistics ==
=== Regular season and playoffs ===
| | | | Regular season | | | | | Playoffs |
| Season | Team | League | GP | G | A | Pts | PIM | GP | G | A | Pts | PIM |
|---|---|---|---|---|---|---|---|---|---|---|---|---|
| 1980–81 | Montreal-Concordia | QMAAA | 48 | 18 | 17 | 35 | — | 3 | 0 | 1 | 1 | — |
| 1981–82 | Montreal-Concordia | QMAAA | 45 | 30 | 38 | 68 | — | 5 | 8 | 4 | 12 | — |
| 1982–83 | Shawinigan Cataractes | QMJHL | 70 | 27 | 42 | 69 | 93 | 10 | 5 | 4 | 9 | 55 |
| 1983–84 | Shawinigan Cataractes | QMJHL | 68 | 42 | 88 | 130 | 235 | 6 | 4 | 4 | 8 | 13 |
| 1983–84 | Montreal Canadiens | NHL | 1 | 0 | 0 | 0 | 0 | — | — | — | — | — |
| 1983–84 | Nova Scotia Voyageurs | AHL | — | — | — | — | — | 8 | 0 | 2 | 2 | 4 |
| 1984–85 | Shawinigan Cataractes | QMJHL | 64 | 56 | 90 | 146 | 216 | 8 | 7 | 8 | 15 | 37 |
| 1984–85 | Shawinigan Cataractes | M-Cup | — | — | — | — | — | 4 | 1 | 4 | 5 | 18 |
| 1985–86 | Montreal Canadiens | NHL | 24 | 8 | 7 | 15 | 46 | — | — | — | — | — |
| 1986–87 | Montreal Canadiens | NHL | 59 | 14 | 17 | 31 | 96 | 11 | 1 | 3 | 4 | 31 |
| 1986–87 | Sherbrooke Canadiens | AHL | 6 | 1 | 6 | 7 | 10 | — | — | — | — | — |
| 1987–88 | Montreal Canadiens | NHL | 53 | 7 | 14 | 21 | 101 | 6 | 0 | 2 | 2 | 16 |
| 1988–89 | St. Louis Blues | NHL | 53 | 9 | 17 | 26 | 139 | 10 | 2 | 5 | 7 | 24 |
| 1989–90 | St. Louis Blues | NHL | 79 | 24 | 32 | 56 | 199 | 12 | 3 | 2 | 5 | 63 |
| 1990–91 | St. Louis Blues | NHL | 59 | 10 | 18 | 28 | 131 | — | — | — | — | — |
| 1990–91 | Vancouver Canucks | NHL | 11 | 6 | 2 | 8 | 43 | 6 | 0 | 3 | 3 | 25 |
| 1991–92 | Vancouver Canucks | NHL | 59 | 20 | 23 | 43 | 198 | 13 | 0 | 5 | 5 | 30 |
| 1992–93 | Vancouver Canucks | NHL | 84 | 18 | 20 | 38 | 200 | 12 | 3 | 0 | 3 | 30 |
| 1993–94 | Vancouver Canucks | NHL | 68 | 14 | 13 | 27 | 149 | 24 | 3 | 4 | 7 | 56 |
| 1994–95 | HC Devils Milano | AL | 4 | 3 | 7 | 10 | 4 | — | — | — | — | — |
| 1994–95 | HC Devils Milano | ITA | 2 | 1 | 4 | 5 | 2 | — | — | — | — | — |
| 1994–95 | Vancouver Canucks | NHL | 48 | 10 | 15 | 25 | 65 | 11 | 3 | 1 | 4 | 16 |
| 1995–96 | Toronto Maple Leafs | NHL | 54 | 7 | 8 | 15 | 112 | — | — | — | — | — |
| 1995–96 | New York Rangers | NHL | 19 | 4 | 4 | 8 | 30 | 11 | 3 | 1 | 4 | 14 |
| 1996–97 | New York Rangers | NHL | 9 | 0 | 0 | 0 | 11 | — | — | — | — | — |
| 1996–97 | St. Louis Blues | NHL | 31 | 1 | 3 | 4 | 37 | 3 | 0 | 0 | 0 | 6 |
| 1997–98 | Kölner Haie | DEL | 42 | 14 | 19 | 33 | 193 | 3 | 1 | 2 | 3 | 4 |
| 1998–99 | Nürnberg Ice Tigers | DEL | 48 | 26 | 33 | 59 | 212 | 13 | 4 | 7 | 11 | 24 |
| 1999–00 | Kölner Haie | DEL | 51 | 16 | 21 | 37 | 165 | 9 | 4 | 1 | 5 | 6 |
| 2000–01 | Kölner Haie | DEL | 31 | 6 | 11 | 17 | 76 | 2 | 0 | 0 | 0 | 4 |
| NHL totals | | | 711 | 152 | 193 | 345 | 1557 | 119 | 18 | 26 | 44 | 311 |

== Post playing media career ==
He has been giving radio commentary for Montreal Canadiens hockey on the English-language radio station with the play-by-play rights working for CJAD until the end of the 2010–2011 season. For the 2011–2012 season, TSN 690 the Montreal TSN Radio station obtained English language rights for games and Momesso currently provides commentary for them. He is a major contributor to the Hockey with an Accent podcast which he cohosts with other former NHL Players; Mathieu Dandenault, Maxim Lapierre, and Pascal Leclaire
