= Mary Melfi =

Canadian writer of Italian descent (born 1951)

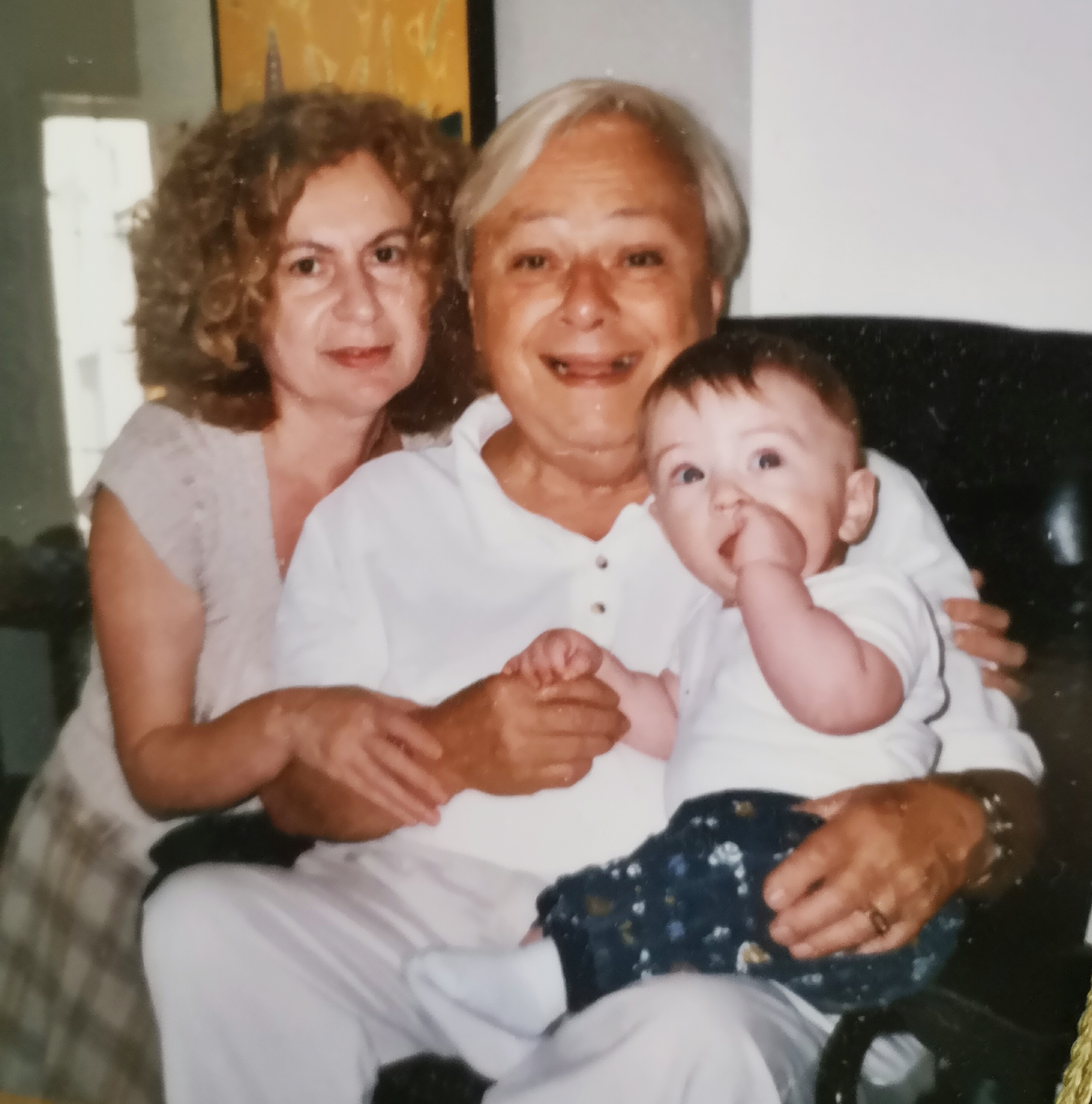
- Melfi (left) and George Nemeth (centre) with their grandson, circa 2007
- Born: 1951 (age 74–75); Casacalenda, Campobasso, Italy
- Occupation: Writer
- Spouse: George Nemeth (m. 1975; died 2009)

Mary Melfi (Casacalenda, Italy, 1951) is a Canadian writer of Italian descent. She is a prolific poet, novelist, and playwright.

== Biography ==
Melfi was born in Casacalenda, a small mountain town in the province of Campobasso, in the region of Molise, southeast of Rome, in 1951. At the age of six, she immigrated with her family to Montreal, Quebec where she attended the local English schools. She received a B.A. in English Literature from Concordia University and a Masters of Library Science from McGill University. Since completing her studies in 1977 she has published over a dozen books of critically acclaimed poetry and prose. Her first novel, Infertility Rites, was published by Guernica Editions in 1991; it was later translated into French and Italian. In 1994 Doubleday Canada published her children's fantasy book: Ubu, the Witch Who Would be Rich. Also a playwright, Mary Melfi's works for the theater have been workshopped in Montreal, Toronto and Vancouver. Noted for her black humour, wry wit and imaginative style critics have suggested that this author manages "not only to make us laugh, but also think." The Concise Oxford Companion to Canadian Literature observes that "her writings are characterized by an avant-garde sensibility that transgresses the conventions of a given literary form (whether it is poetry, drama or fiction)…. Melfi is interested in the metaphysical side of human existence, the difficulties of establishing a coherent feminine identity, cultural dislocation, and the artist’s attempt to create a new reality." In-depth reviews of her writings can be found in William Anselmi's book: Mary Melfi, Essays on her Work (Guernica Editions, 2007). Melfi's account of peasant life in Southern Italy during the 1930s entitled Italy Revisited: Conversations with my Mother was published in 2009 by Guernica Editions. To complement the book, Melfi has created a website in which she has compiled hundreds of photos of peasant life in turn of the century Italy.

Mary Melfi presently lives in Montreal. She lived with her husband until his death in 2009.

== Works ==
=== Nonfiction ===
- Painting Moments: Art, AIDS and Nick Palazzo. [Editor]. Guernica Editions, 1998
- Italy Revisited: Conversations with my Mother. Guernica Editions, 2009
- In the Backyard: Relearning the Art of Aging, Dying and Making Love. Guernica Editions, 2018.

=== Adult fiction ===
- A Dialogue with Masks. Mosaic Press, 1985.
- Infertility Rites. Guernica Editions, 1991.
- Via Roma. Guernica Editions, 2015.

=== Children’s Fiction ===
- Ubu, the Witch Who Would be Rich. Doubleday Canada, 1994.

=== Plays ===
- Sex Therapy, A Black Comedy: A Play in 13 scenes. Guernica Editions, 1996.
- Foreplay and My Italian Wife: Two Plays. Guernica Editions, 2012.

=== Poetry ===
- The Dance, The Cage and The Horse. D Press, 1976.
- A Queen Is Holding a Mummified Cat. Guernica Editions, 1982.
- A Bride in Three Acts. Guernica Editions, 1983.
- The O Canada Poems. Brandon University, 1986.
- A Season in Beware. Black Moss Press, 1989.
- Stages: Selected Poems. Guernica Editions, 1998.
- Office Politics. Guernica Editions, 1999.
- Welcome to Hard Times. Ekstasis Press, 2023

=== Books in Translation (French) ===
- Les Rites de l’Infertilite [translated by Jocelyne Doray]. Balzac-Le Griot, 1999.
- Là-bas, en Italie [translated by Claude Bèland]. Les Editions Triptyque, 2015.
- Via Roma [translated by Claude Bèland]. Les Editions Triptyque, 2018.

=== Books in Translation (Italian) ===
- Riti di Infertilita [translated by Silvana Mangione]. Iannone Editions, 2002.
- Ritorno in Italia [translated by Laura Ferri]. Iannone Editions, 2012.

=== Theatre Productions ===
- Sex Therapy, a black comedy, a staged reading, Feb. 10, 1994 at The Liberal Arts College, Concordia University, Montreal. Director: Ann Page. Cast: Emma Campbell, Martin David Chochinov, Paul Dijkman, Alana Ghent, Niki Landau, Rosmarie MacNeil, Andrew Matheson and Ann Page.
- My Italian Wife, a comedy, Canadian premiere at The Casa d’Italia, November 2015. Producer: Sons of Italy. Director: Leo Samà. Cast: Lisa Giannini, Paolo De Paolo, Catherine De Luca and Anthony Gervasi.
- Via Roma, a script-in-hand reading, August 23, 2018, at Theatre NDG. Cast: Marissa M Blair, Erin Farmer-Perrine, Michael Aronovitch, Irwin Rapoport, Mel Guimont, Ira Salman and Elise DeBussac.
- 7 Ways to Say, Ti Amo, a romantic comedy/drama. Canadian premiere at The Casa d'Italia, June 2025. Producer: The Order of the Sons and Daughters of Italy in Montreal. Director: Leo Samà. Cast: Julie Montpetit, Santino Credali and Paolo De Paola
- Painting Moments, a staged reading, Feb. 7 & 8, 2026, at Espace des Possibles Petite Patrie, Montreal. Producer: Primal Edge Theatre. Director: Sharon Malone. Cast: Nick Fontaine.

=== Screenplays ===
- Becoming Artemisia (2023)

=== Critical Appraisals (Published) ===
- Mary Melfi, Essays on her Works, edited by William Anselmi, Guernica Editions, 2007.
- Italian-Canadian Narratives of Return, Analysing Cultural Translation in Diasporic Writing, by Michela Baldo, Palgrave, Macmillan, 2019.

=== PhDs and MA Theses on Melfi’s Work ===
- Licia Canton, “Six Italian-Canadian Novelists: Mary Melfi, Antonio D'Alfonso, Marisa De Francchi, F.G. Paci, Catherina Edwards.” University of Montreal, 1997
- Maria Dell’ Anna, “I due mondi di Mary Melfi,” University of Lecce, Italy, 1998-1999.
- Lise Hogan, “Poetics as Displaced Praxis: Perspectives of Irony in the Poetry of Mary Melfi.” University of Alberta, 2004.
- Nadia Santoro, “Narrzioni migranti di (dis)appartenenza. ” University of Calabria, 2014.
- Tiziana Nannavecchia, “Translating Italian-Canadian Migrant Writing to Italian: a Discourse Around the Return to the Motherland/Tongue,” University of Ottawa, 2016.

=== Interviews (Abridged) ===
- CBC Radio, Brave New Waves, March 13, 1986.
- CFCF TV, Postscript with John Cowans, Feb. 5, 1992.
- Interviews with the Phoenix, Interviews with Fifteen Italian-Quebecois Artists, Fulvio Caccia, Guernica Editions, 1996.
- Panaram Italia, Liz Allemang, Panoram Italia June/July 2015
- CTV, What’s On, with Christine Long, Nov. 25, 2015.
- Global News Morning, with Laura Casella, August 27, 2018.
- CJAD 800am Passion Radio Show with Dr. Laurie Betito, August 22, 2018.
- CKUW 95.9 P.I. Poetry, Winnipeg, with Carmelo Militano, Nov. 25, 2018
- Italian Canadiana. 2019, Vol. 33, interviewed by John Lewis.
- Accenti. April 2020, interviewed by Liana Cusmano
- Italocanadese, February 2024, interviewed by Domenico Capilongo
