= Massimo Boninsegni =

Theoretical condensed matter physicist

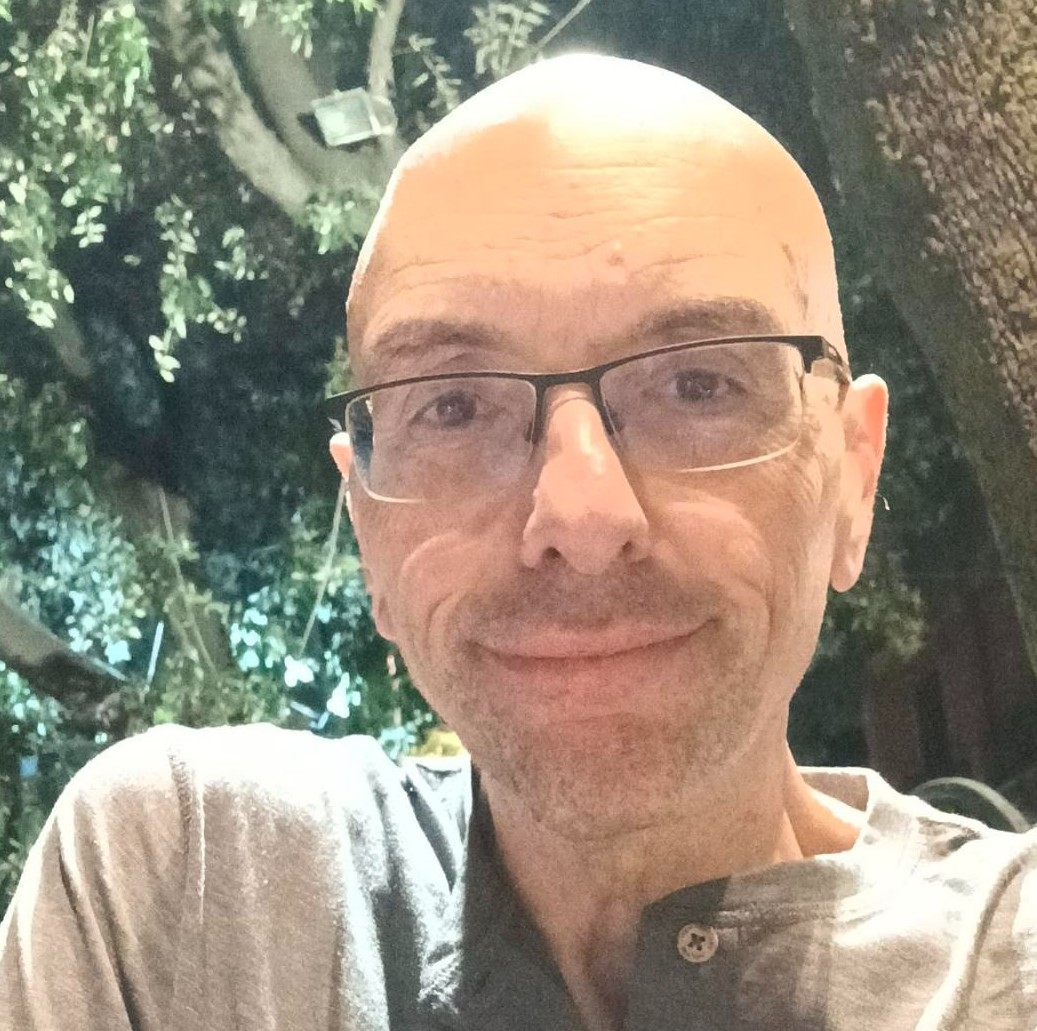
Massimo Boninsegni in July 2023

Massimo Boninsegni (born 1963 in Genova, Italy) is an Italian-Canadian theoretical condensed matter physicist. He graduated with a Bachelor's degree in physics at the Universita' degli Studi di Genova in 1986.

He moved to the United States in 1987, where he received a doctoral degree in physics from Florida State University in 1992. His Ph.D. thesis was on numerical studies of a strongly correlated electronic model of high-temperature superconductivity. He took on postdoctoral positions at the University of Illinois at Urbana-Champaign and University of Delaware, before becoming in 1997 an assistant professor of physics at San Diego State University. He moved to the University of Alberta in 2002, where he has been a professor of physics since 2005.

His research interests are in the areas of superfluidity, superconductivity, Bose-Einstein condensation and Quantum Monte Carlo simulations. His main contribution is in computational quantum many-body physics, specifically to the development of the continuous-space Worm Algorithm for the simulation of strongly correlated Bose systems at finite temperature. He also contributed to the study of the condensed phase of molecular hydrogen, chiefly the superfluid properties of small clusters, as well as of the supersolid phase of matter.

He was awarded the status of Fellow of the American Physical Society in 2007 for "the development of a novel methodology enabling accurate, large-scale Quantum Monte Carlo simulations of interacting many-body systems, and for its application to the investigation of the supersolid phase of helium and of superfluidity of molecular hydrogen".

== See also ==
- List of fellows of the American Physical Society (1998–2010)
