= Alessandro Momesso =

Italian-Canadian soccer player (1926–2006)

Personal information
- Full name: Alessandro Momesso
- Date of birth: 1926
- Place of birth: Cessalto, Kingdom of Italy
- Date of death: 16 September 2006 (aged 80)
- Position: Fullback

Senior career*
Years	Team	Apps	(Gls)
1951–1958	Montréal Italia / Cantalia FC		
1959–1960	Ukraina Montréal		
- * Club domestic league appearances and goals

Alessandro Momesso (1926 – 16 September 2006) was an Italian-Canadian soccer player. He was a standout player that most notably played for the Montréal Italia / Cantalia FC franchise in the 1950s.

== Career ==
From 1951 to 1958, Momesso played for Italia / Cantalia, who played in Montréal League and the National Soccer League of Ontario/Québec. In 1951, he helped Italia reach the semi-final stage of Canadian final. In 1954, Momesso won the McLagan Trophy as Montreal's most valuable player.

== Personal life and death ==
Alessandro Momesso died on 16 September 2006, at the age of 80. His son is former NHL player Sergio Momesso.
