= Luigi Logrippo =

- Born: Italy
- Education: University of Rome (Laurea in Law); University of Manitoba (MSc); University of Waterloo (PhD)
- Occupations: Computer Science, Formal methods
- Known for: Formal methods in software engineering and security LOTOS group

Luigi Logrippo is a Professor of Computer Science at the Université du Québec en Outaouais (UQO). He is the principal researcher of the LOTOS group at the University Of Ottawa. Currently luigi participates in LARSI.

== Research areas ==
Formal methods in security, privacy and governance including:

- Formal specification, formal design, validation, verification, testing
- Security: Enterprise data security; Access control models and methods
- Legal conformance, privacy

Normative systems:

- Formal methods in telecom software engineering:
- Process algebras, LOTOS and E-LOTOS languages
- Feature interaction problem

== Biography ==
Logrippo was born in Italy, received a "laurea" in law from the University of Rome in 1961. Until 1967, he worked with Olivetti, Olivetti-Bull, General Electric, and Siemens as a programmer and systems analyst. From 1967 to 1969 he worked as a research associate at the Institute for Computer Studies. He obtained a MSc in Computer Science from University of Manitoba in 1969. Luigi obtained a PhD in Computer Science at the University of Waterloo in 1974. From 1973 to 2002 I have been with the University of Ottawa, first in the Department of Computer Science and then in the School of Information Technology and Engineering (SITE). Luigi was Chair of the Computer Science Department from 1991 to 1997 and Administrative Director of SITE in 1997/98. He had sabbaticals at Bell Northern Research (which became Nortel), at the University of Twente (NL) and at the University of Stirling (Scotland).

Lorgippo retired from the University of Ottawa and since July 1, 2002 he is currently a professor at the nearby Université du Québec en Outaouais, Département d'informatique et ingénierie.

== Selected publications ==
- Hemanth Khambhammettu, Sofiene Boulares, Kamel Adi, Luigi Logrippo. A Framework for Threat Assessment in Access Control Systems. To appear in the Proc. of SEC 2012, the 2012 IFIP International Information Security and Privacy Conference, Heraklion, June 4–6.
- Bernard Stepien, Hemanth Khambhammettu, Kamel Adi, Luigi Logrippo. CatBAC: A Generic Framework for Designing and Validating Hybrid Access Control Models. To appear in the Proc. of SFCS 2012, the First IEEE International Workshop on Security and Forensics in Communication Systems, Ottawa, June 10–15, 2012
- Yacine Bouzida, Luigi Logrippo, Sergei Mankovski. Concrete and Abstract Based Access Control. To appear in the International Journal of Information Security, Springer. The final publication is available at www.springerlink.com. Int. J. Inf. Secur. DOI 10.1007/s10207-011-0138-1. Published online 14 July 2011.
- Logrippo, L. From e-business to e-laws and e-judgments: 4,000 years of experience. CYBERLAWS 2011, Proc. of the Second International Conference on Technical and Legal Aspects of the e-Society, Guadeloupe, Feb 2011, 22-28.
- Slimani, N., Khambhammettu, H., Adi, K., Logrippo, L. UACML: Unified Access Control Modeling Language. In: New Technologies, Mobility and Security (NTMS), 2011 4th IFIP International Conference in February 2011, 1-8.
- Ma, J., Logrippo, L., Adi, K., Mankovski, S. Risk Analysis in Access Control Systems Based on Trust Theories. The 3rd Workshop on Logics for Intelligent Agents and Multi-Agent Systems (WLIAMas 2010). Toronto, August 2010, 415-418.
- Shaikh, R.A., Adi, K., Logrippo, L., Mankovski, S. Inconsistency Detection Method for Access Control Policies. IEEE sixth International Conference on Information Assurance and Security (IAS 2010), Atlanta, Aug. 2010, 204-209.
- Ma, J., Adi, K., Mejri, M., Logrippo, L. Risk Analysis in Access Control Systems. Eight Intern. Conf. on Privacy, Security, and Trust (PST 2010). Ottawa, Aug. 2010, 160-166.
- Shaikh, R.A., Adi, K., Logrippo, L., Mankovski, S. Detecting Incompleteness in Access Control Policies Using Data Classification Schemes, In Proc. of the 5th International Conference on Digital Information Management (ICDIM 2010), Thunder Bay, Canada, July 2010, IEEE Press, 417-422.
- Ma, J., Adi, K., Logrippo, L., Mankovski, S. Risk Management in Dynamic Role Based Access Control Systems. Proc. of the 5th International Conference on Digital Information Management (ICDIM 2010), Thunder Bay, Canada, July 2010, IEEE Press, 423-430.
- Plesa, R., Logrippo, L. An Agent-Based Architecture for Providing Enhanced Communication Services. Chapter 15 in: Laurence T. Yang (Ed.) Research in Mobile Intelligence – Wiley series on Parallel and Distributed Computing, 2010. 320-342.
- Hassan, W., Logrippo, L. A Governance Requirements Extraction Model for Legal Compliance Validation. In Proc. IEEE 17th International Requirements Engineering Conference (RE'09): RELAW Workshop. Atlanta, GA. Sep. 2009, 7-12.
- Adi, K., Bouzida, Y., Hattak, I., Logrippo, L., Mankovskii, S. Typing for Conflict Detection in Access Control Policies. In: G. Babin, P. Kropf, M. Weiss (Eds.): E-Technologies: Innovation in an Open World. Proc. of the 4th Intern. Conf. MCETECH 2009 (Ottawa, May 2009), Lecture Notes in Business Information Processing (LNBIP 26), Springer, 2009, 212-226.
- Hassan, W. and Logrippo, L. Requirements and Compliance in Legal Systems: a Logic Approach. In Proc. IEEE 16th International Requirements Engineering Conference (RE'08): RELAW Workshop. Barcelona, Spain. Sep. 2008, 40-44.
- Logrippo, L. Normative Systems: the Meeting Point between Jurisprudence and Information Technology? In: H. Fujita, D. Pisanelli (Eds.): New Trends in Software Methodologies, Tools and Techniques – Proc. of the 6th SoMeT_07. IOS Press, 2007, 343-354.
