= Valerio Alesi =

Canadian soccer player (born 1966)

Personal information
- Date of birth: September 5, 1966 (age 59)
- Place of birth: Hamilton, Ontario, Canada

Senior career*
Years	Team	Apps	(Gls)
1984–1985	Ascoli	2	(1)
1985-1986	Unknown		
1986-1987	Civitavecchia	?	(?)
1988-1989	Bolzano	?	(?)
1989-1990	Acri	?	(?)
1990-1992	Fermana	?	(?)
1992-1993	Maceratese	?	(?)
- * Club domestic league appearances and goals

Valerio Alesi (born September 5, 1966) is a Canadian born, Italian former professional soccer player.

Alesi played 2 competitive matches in Serie A when he joined Ascoli Calcio in 1984. After just one season with Ascoli, he joined lower division sides up to late 1990s.
