= Matteo Piscopo =

Canadian soccer player

Personal information
- Date of birth: 9 August 1954 (age 72)

International career
Years	Team	Apps	(Gls)
1974	Canada	1	(0)

Matteo Piscopo (born 9 August 1954) is a Canadian retired international soccer player.

== International career ==
Piscopo made his debut for Canada in an April 1974 friendly match against Bermuda.
