= Dorothy Thomas (politician) =

Canadian politician

Toronto City Councillor for Ward 9
- In office 1972–1976 Serving with Reid Scott
- Preceded by: Tom Wardle
- Succeeded by: Pat Sheppard, Tom Wardle, Jr.
- In office 1980–1985 Serving with Pat Sheppard
- Preceded by: Tom Wardle, Jr.
- Succeeded by: Paul Christie

Personal details
- Born: 1938
- Died: May 9, 2005 (aged 67)
- Spouse: Ralph Thomas (div.)

Dorothy Thomas, née Mikos was a Canadian politician who served on the Toronto City Council from 1972 to 1976 and from 1980 to 1985.

Thomas studied journalism at the University of Toronto and worked as an arts reporter at the Toronto Star before marrying film director Ralph Thomas. As a resident of The Beaches, she became an activist in the campaign against the Scarborough Expressway, and ran for municipal office in the 1972 election, defeating incumbent councillor Tom Wardle. She was one of several progressive reform candidates, including Elizabeth Eayrs, Michael Goldrick, Colin Vaughan, Dan Heap, Karl Jaffary, Reid Scott, John Sewell and Anne Johnston, who were elected alongside mayor David Crombie.

Thomas was re-elected in the 1974 election, but was defeated in the 1976 election by Tom Wardle Jr., the son of the councillor she had defeated in 1972. She ran again in the 1980 election, defeating Wardle, and served until the 1985 election, when she was defeated by Paul Christie.

Thomas and council colleague Dale Martin made national headlines in 1985 when, while attending a Federation of Canadian Municipalities conference in Calgary, they got into a war of words with Calgary mayor Ralph Klein about how ugly and poorly planned they perceived the city to be; Thomas was also quoted as calling Calgary City Hall an "abomination". Both Thomas and Martin later apologized for the comments.

Following her electoral defeat, Thomas was appointed head of Metro Toronto's licensing commission, and continued to serve on the Toronto Licensing Commission until 2003. In 1996, she coauthored a report investigating problems with the city's process for licensing taxis. She also remained an active member of the New Democratic Party.

Thomas died of cancer on May 9, 2005.
