= Jack Harris (Ontario politician) =

Canadian politician

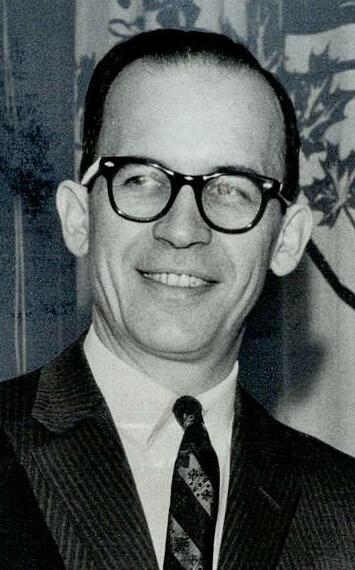

Member of Provincial Parliament for the Beaches
- In office 1962–1967
- Preceded by: William Collings
- Succeeded by: Riding abolished

Personal details
- Born: September 16, 1917 York, Ontario, Canada
- Died: June 12, 1997 (aged 79) Toronto, Ontario, Canada
- Party: Progressive Conservative
- Spouse: Mary

Military service
- Branch/service: 48th Highlanders of Canada
- Years of service: 1940–1945
- Rank: Major

Robert John Harris (September 16, 1917 – June 12, 1997) was a politician in Ontario, Canada. He was a Progressive Conservative member of the Legislative Assembly of Ontario from 1962 to 1967 who represented the downtown Toronto riding of Beaches.

== Background ==
Harris was born at Toronto East General Hospital, in East York, a hospital founded by his father, Joseph Henry Harris, in 1929. During World War II, he saw five years of service in Italy, France, the Netherlands and Germany. He started the war as a Lieutenant Captain of the 48th Highlanders of Canada infantry regiment and he was promoted to the rank of Major before returning to Canada.

He served on a variety of community and charitable boards, including those of the Toronto East General Hospital, the Toronto East YMCA, and the Royal Canadian Legion. He was married to his wife, Mary, for 49 years and they had three children.

== Politics ==
Harris was elected to the legislature in a 1962 by-election, following the death of the sitting MPP, William Collings. He defeated Liberal Jack MacGregor by 256 votes. After the ballots were counted, MacGregor requested a recount but it did not change the vote difference. Harris served as a backbench supporter in the government led by Premier John Robarts. Harris was re-elected in the subsequent provincial general election, in 1963. He was the Chief Government Whip and also served as Vice-Chair of the Liquor Control Board of Ontario.

Prior to the 1967 election, the riding was reconfigured and combined with the neighbouring riding of Woodbine to form Beaches-Woodbine. Harris lost to New Democrat John Brown by 545 votes.
