= Beaches (provincial electoral district) =

Former provincial electoral district in Ontario, Canada

Ontario electoral district
- Beaches in relation to adjacent ridings in Toronto

Defunct provincial electoral district
- Legislature: Legislative Assembly of Ontario
- District created: 1925
- District abolished: 1966
- First contested: 1926
- Last contested: 1967

Demographics
- Census division: Toronto
- Census subdivision: Toronto

Beaches was a provincial riding in Toronto, Ontario, Canada represented in the Legislative Assembly of Ontario from 1926 to 1967. It was carved completely out of the existing riding of York East. Its boundaries remained the same until 1967 when it was merged with the neighbouring riding of Woodbine to become Beaches—Woodbine. Other than a single session in the 1940s, the riding was steadfastly Conservative in its voting preference.

== Boundaries ==
The riding was created out of the East York riding just before the 1926 election. Its western boundary consisted of Woodbine Avenue from Lake Ontario north to the city limits. Its eastern boundary followed Victoria Park Avenue from the lake to the city limits. The northern boundary was the city limits and the southern boundary was Lake Ontario. The boundaries remained unchanged until it was abolished in 1967.

== Members of Provincial Parliament ==
Beaches
Assembly	Years	Member	Party
Prior to 1926 part of York East
17th	1926–1929	Thomas Alexander Murphy (Note: In 1938, the title of Member of the Legislative Assembly was officially changed to Member of Provincial Parliament. Previously, it was unofficially used in the media and in the Legislature.) (Note: The Conservative party changed their name to Progressive Conservative before the 1943 election.)	Conservative
18th	1929–1934	Thomas Alexander Murphy	Conservative
19th	1934–1937	Thomas Alexander Murphy	Conservative
20th	1937–1943	Thomas Alexander Murphy	Conservative
21st	1943–1945	Thomas Alexander Murphy	Progressive Conservative
22nd	1945–1948	Thomas Alexander Murphy	Progressive Conservative
23rd	1948–1951	Reid Scott	Co-operative Commonwealth
24th	1951–1955	William Collings	Progressive Conservative
25th	1955–1959	William Collings	Progressive Conservative
26th	1959–1961	William Collings	Progressive Conservative
26th	1961–1963	Jack Harris	Progressive Conservative
27th	1963–1967	Jack Harris	Progressive Conservative
Sourced from the Ontario Legislative Assembly
Merged into the Beaches—Woodbine after 1966

== Election results ==
1963 Ontario general election
Party	Candidate	Votes	%	±%
Progressive Conservative	Jack Harris	7,277	40.67	+5.86
New Democratic	Stan Bullock	6,457	36.09	+4.00
Liberal	Donald Deacon	4,158	23.24	–9.86
Total valid votes		17,892	99.25	
Total rejected ballots		136	0.75	–0.23
Turnout		18,028	68.00	+9.36
Eligible voters		26,511		
Progressive Conservative hold		Swing		+0.93
Source: Elections Ontario

Ontario provincial by-election, January 18, 1962
Party	Candidate	Votes	%	±%
Progressive Conservative	Jack Harris	5,207	34.81	–11.09
Liberal	Donald Gordon MacGregor	4,952	33.10	+6.71
New Democratic	Stanley T. Bullock	4,800	32.09	+4.39
Total valid votes		14,959	99.01	
Total rejected ballots		149	0.99	–0.18
Turnout		15,108	58.64	+1.48
Eligible voters		25,763		
Progressive Conservative hold		Swing		–8.90
Source: Elections Ontario

1959 Ontario general election
Party	Candidate	Votes	%	±%
Progressive Conservative	William Collings	7,294	45.90	–2.22
Co-operative Commonwealth	Stan Bullock	4,402	27.70	–8.54
Liberal	Ronald Pickering	4,195	26.40	+10.76
Total valid votes		15,891	98.83	
Total rejected ballots		188	1.17	+0.29
Turnout		16,079	57.16	–0.91
Eligible voters		28,130		
Progressive Conservative hold		Swing		+3.16
Source: Elections Ontario

1955 Ontario general election
Party	Candidate	Votes	%	±%
Progressive Conservative	William Collings	7,965	48.12	–1.16
Co-operative Commonwealth	Reid Scott	5,999	36.24	+0.29
Liberal	Edward Robert Hoolan	2,589	15.64	+0.86
Total valid votes		16,553	99.12	
Total rejected ballots		147	0.88	+0.07
Turnout		16,700	58.07	–8.11
Eligible voters		28,760		
Progressive Conservative hold		Swing		–0.73
Source: Elections Ontario

1951 Ontario general election
Party	Candidate	Votes	%	±%
Progressive Conservative	William Collings	9,904	49.28	+7.20
Co-operative Commonwealth	Reid Scott	7,225	35.95	–8.09
Liberal	W. Earl Upper	2,970	14.78	+0.89
Total valid votes		20,099	99.19	
Total rejected ballots		164	0.81	+0.19
Turnout		20,263	66.17	–5.81
Eligible voters		30,621		
Progressive Conservative gain from Co-operative Commonwealth		Swing		+7.64
Source: Elections Ontario

1948 Ontario general election
Party	Candidate	Votes	%	±%
Co-operative Commonwealth	Reid Scott	9,910	44.03	+13.43
Progressive Conservative	Thomas Alexander Murphy	9,470	42.08	–10.30
Liberal	W. Earl Upper	3,126	13.89	–3.13
Total valid votes		22,506	99.38	
Total rejected ballots		141	0.62	–0.09
Turnout		22,647	71.98	+1.86
Eligible voters		31,463		
Co-operative Commonwealth gain from Progressive Conservative		Swing		+11.86
Source: Elections Ontario

1945 Ontario general election
Party	Candidate	Votes	%	±%
Progressive Conservative	Thomas Alexander Murphy	11,676	52.38	+8.63
Co-operative Commonwealth	Robert Garden	6,822	30.60	–12.88
Liberal	William E. J. Ryan	3,794	17.02	+4.25
Total valid votes		22,292	99.28	
Total rejected ballots		161	0.72	–0.16
Turnout		22,453	70.12	+11.45
Eligible voters		32,022		
Progressive Conservative hold		Swing		+10.75
Source: Elections Ontario

1943 Ontario general election
Party	Candidate	Votes	%	±%
Progressive Conservative	Thomas Alexander Murphy	6,926	43.75	+1.46
Co-operative Commonwealth	George Ferguson	6,884	43.48	+24.19
Liberal	Ernest Bray	2,021	12.77	–25.65
Total valid votes		15,831	99.12	
Total rejected ballots		140	0.88	+0.05
Turnout		15,971	58.67	–9.43
Eligible voters		27,224		
Progressive Conservative hold		Swing		–11.37
Source: Elections Ontario

1937 Ontario general election
Party	Candidate	Votes	%	±%
Conservative	Thomas Alexander Murphy	7,915	42.29	–2.09
Liberal	Ernest Bray	7,190	38.42	+10.85
Co-operative Commonwealth	M. Stanley Elliott	3,611	19.29	–8.77
Total valid votes		18,716	99.17	
Total rejected ballots		156	0.83	+0.27
Turnout		18,872	68.09	+0.47
Eligible voters		27,715		
Conservative hold		Swing		–6.47
Source: Elections Ontario

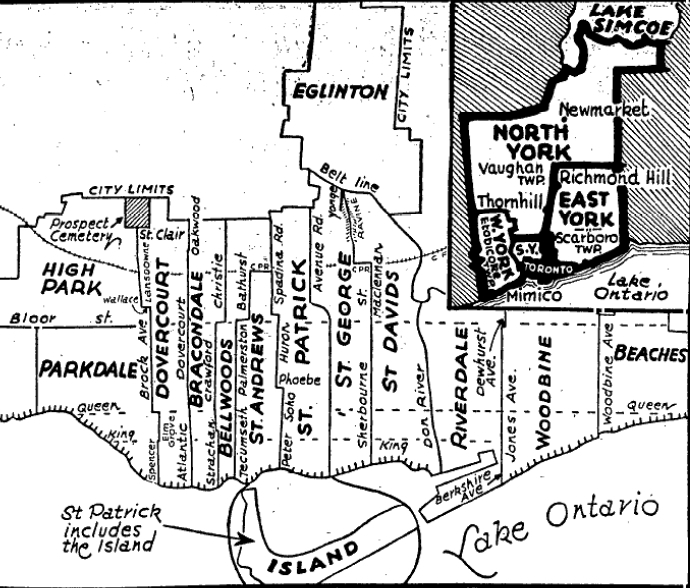
Toronto riding boundaries after 1934 redistribution

1934 Ontario general election
Party	Candidate	Votes	%	±%
Conservative	Thomas Alexander Murphy	7,822	44.38	–31.18
Co-operative Commonwealth	Malcom S. Elliott	4,946	28.06	–
Liberal	Norman Wilks	4,859	27.57	+3.12
Total valid votes		17,627	99.45	
Total rejected ballots		98	0.55	+0.14
Turnout		17,725	67.62	+27.23
Eligible voters		26,212		
Conservative hold		Swing		–15.59
Source: Elections Ontario

1929 Ontario general election
Party	Candidate	Votes	%	±%
Conservative	Thomas Alexander Murphy	8,034	75.55	+2.47
Liberal	William Henry Ford	2,600	24.45	–
Total valid votes		10,634	99.59	
Total rejected ballots		44	0.41	–0.16
Turnout		10,678	40.40	–24.43
Eligible voters		26,433		
Conservative hold		Swing		+1.23
Source: Elections Ontario

1926 Ontario general election
Party	Candidate	Votes	%
Conservative	Thomas Alexander Murphy	9,590	73.08
Better Citizenship (Prohibitionist)	Arthur Hawkes	3,532	26.92
Total valid votes		13,122	99.43
Total rejected ballots		75	0.57
Turnout		13,197	64.83
Eligible voters		20,356	
Conservative pickup new district.			
Source: Elections Ontario

== See also ==
- List of Ontario provincial electoral districts
- Canadian provincial electoral districts
