= Kenneth Bryden =

Canadian politician

Ken Bryden

Ontario MPP
- In office 1959–1967
- Preceded by: Harold Fishleigh
- Succeeded by: Riding abolished
- Constituency: Woodbine

Personal details
- Born: April 9, 1916
- Died: December 17, 2001 (aged 85) Toronto, Ontario
- Party: CCF (1959–1963); New Democrat (1963–1967)
- Spouse: Marion Bryden
- Profession: Economist

Walter Kenneth (Ken) Bryden (April 9, 1916 – December 17, 2001) was a Co-operative Commonwealth Federation/NDP member of the Ontario legislature from 1959 to 1967, an economist, academic, civil servant and author.

== Background ==
Bryden was one of two sons born to Walter Bryden, a Presbyterian minister and theologian, and his wife, Violet Naismith Bannatyine.

He grew up in Ontario and Saskatchewan and earned a BA (1937), MA (1940) and PhD (1969) from the University of Toronto as well as a BA from Oxford University in 1939.

An economist by training, Bryden worked for the federal Department of Labour during World War II.

== Politics ==
He was an early supporter and strategist for the CCF federally, in Ontario and Saskatchewan. Following the election of the first CCF government in North America, in Saskatchewan, in 1944, Saskatchewan CCF Premier Tommy Douglas appointed Bryden deputy minister of labour. Bryden drafted most of the province's labour laws which American union organizer Walter Reuther called the most advanced legislation in all of North America.

In 1949, he moved to Ontario to become first director of research for the party's caucus in the Ontario legislature and became the party's provincial secretary in 1951.

He was first elected to the Ontario legislature in the 1959 provincial election representing the riding of Woodbine in Toronto's east end and became deputy leader of the party under Donald C. MacDonald. He was re-elected in 1963 before retiring in 1967. As a Member of Provincial Parliament, Bryden advocated the creation of the Ontario Health Insurance Plan, opposed the creation of the Provincial Sales Tax and supported expansion of Toronto's subway system. Using their own money, Bryden and his federal counterpart Andrew Brewin opened the first constituency office in Canada.

His wife, Marion Bryden, went on to serve as an MPP in the successor riding of Beaches—Woodbine from 1975 to 1990.

Bryden was one of the forces behind the creation of the New Democratic Party of Canada in 1961. as a merger of the CCF and the Canadian Labour Congress, and drafted its constitution and helped draft its program with David Lewis, Brewin and F. R. Scott.

As a political strategist, Bryden introduced the concept of door-to-door canvassing to Canada, which soon became a standard technique for all parties. Historian Desmond Morton once characterized him as "the shrewdest political mind in the party."

== Later life ==
After leaving the legislature, Bryden earned his PhD at the University of Toronto and then joined the faculty and taught political economy at the University of Toronto until his retirement in 1984. He remained active in community life, serving as president of the Confederation of Resident and Ratepayers Associations and lobbying against the bulldozing of neighbourhoods to create high-rises and expressways and, in the mid-1990s, lobbied against the amalgamation of the city of Toronto.
