= Transportation in Canada =

Canada, the world's second-largest country in total area, is dedicated to having efficient, high-capacity multimodal transportation spanning often vast distances between natural resource extraction sites, agricultural and urban areas. Canada's transportation system includes more than 1,400,000 kilometres (870,000 mi) of roads, 10 major international airports, 300 smaller airports, 72,093 km (44,797 mi) of functioning railway track, and more than 300 commercial ports and harbours that provide access to the Pacific, Atlantic and Arctic oceans as well as the Great Lakes and the St. Lawrence Seaway. In 2005, the transportation sector made up 4.2% of Canada's GDP, compared to 3.7% for Canada's mining and oil and gas extraction industries.

Transport Canada oversees and regulates most aspects of transportation within federal jurisdiction, including interprovincial transport. This primarily includes rail, air and maritime transportation. Transport Canada is under the direction of the federal government's Minister of Transport. The Transportation Safety Board of Canada is responsible for maintaining transportation safety in Canada by investigating accidents and making safety recommendations.

== History ==
The standard history covers the French regime, fur traders, the canals, and early roads, and gives extensive attention to the railways.

=== European contact ===
Prior to the arrival of European settlers, Aboriginal peoples in Canada walked. They also used canoes, kayaks, umiaks and Bull Boats, in addition to the snowshoe, toboggan and sled in winter. They had no wheeled vehicles, and no animals larger than dogs.

Europeans adopted canoes as they pushed deeper into the continent's interior, and were thus able to travel via the waterways that fed from the St. Lawrence River and Hudson Bay.

In the 19th century and early 20th century transportation relied on harnessing oxen to Red River ox carts or horse to wagon. Maritime transportation was via manual labour such as canoe or wind on sail. Water or land travel speeds was approximately 8 to 15 km/h (5 to 9 mph).

Settlement was along river routes. Agricultural commodities were perishable, and trade centres were within 50 km (31 mi). Rural areas centred around villages, and they were approximately 10 km (6 mi) apart. The advent of steam railways and steamships connected resources and markets of vast distances in the late 19th century. Railways also connected city centres, in such a way that the traveller went by sleeper, railway hotel, to the cities. Crossing the country by train took four or five days, as it still does by car. People generally lived within 5 mi (8 km) of the downtown core thus the train could be used for inter-city travel and the tram for commuting.

The advent of controlled-access highways in Canada established ribbon development, truck stops, and industrial corridors along throughways.

=== Evolution ===
Different parts of the country are shut off from each other by Cabot Strait, the Strait of Belle Isle, by areas of rough, rocky forest terrain, such as the region lying between New Brunswick and Quebec, the areas north of Lakes Huron and Superior, dividing the industrial region of Ontario and Quebec from the agricultural areas of the prairies, and the barriers interposed by the mountains of British Columbia

— The Canada Year Book 1956

The Federal Department of Transport (established November 2, 1936) supervised railways, canals, harbours, marine and shipping, civil aviation, radio and meteorology. The Transportation Act of 1938 and the amended Railway Act, placed control and regulation of carriers in the hands of the Board of Transport commissioners for Canada. The Royal Commission on Transportation was formed December 29, 1948, to examine transportation services to all areas of Canada to eliminate economic or geographic disadvantages. The commission also reviewed the Railway Act to provide uniform yet competitive freight-rates.

== Roads ==
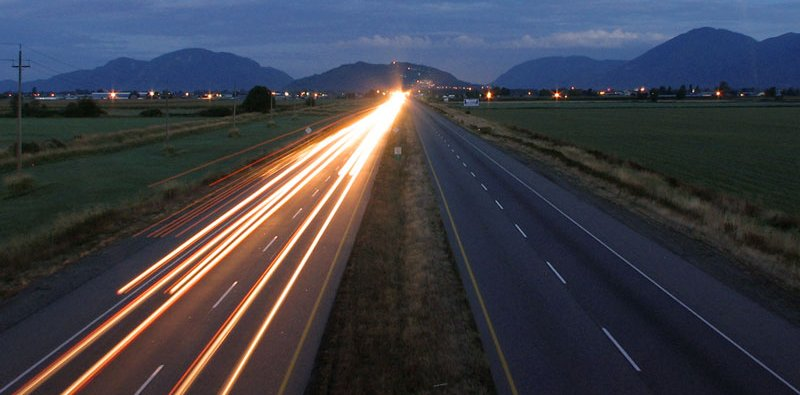
The Trans-Canada Highway in Chilliwack, British Columbia

There is a total of 1,042,300 km (647,700 mi) of roads in Canada, of which 415,600 km (258,200 mi) are paved, including 17,000 km (11,000 mi) of expressways (the third-longest collection in the world, behind the Interstate Highway System of the United States and China's National Trunk Highway System). As of 2008, 626,700 km (389,400 mi) were unpaved. There are no regulations at a federal level that regulate Canada's road infrastructure, highway system, or traffic safety laws; it is left to the individual provinces and territories to regulate these elements. Regulations on a provincial level include Ontario's Highway Traffic Act, Alberta's Traffic Safety Act, and British Columbia's Motor Vehicle Act, for example. The only regulation at a federal level that relates to motor vehicles is the Motor Vehicle Safety Act, which deals with the manufacturing and importing of motor vehicles and motor vehicle equipment within the country.

In 2009, there were 20,706,616 road vehicles registered in Canada, of which 96% were vehicles under 4.5 tonnes (4.4 long tons; 5.0 short tons), 2.4% were vehicles between 4.5 and 15 tonnes (4.4 and 14.8 long tons; 5.0 and 16.5 short tons) and 1.6% were 15 tonnes (15 long tons; 17 short tons) or greater. These vehicles travelled a total of 333.29 billion kilometres, of which 303.6 billion was for vehicles under 4.5 tonnes, 8.3 billion was for vehicles between 4.5 and 15 tonnes and 21.4 billion was for vehicles over 15 tonnes. For the 4.5- to 15-tonne trucks, 88.9% of vehicle-kilometres were intra-province trips, 4.9% were inter-province, 2.8% were between Canada and the US and 3.4% made outside of Canada. For the trucks over 15 tonnes, 59.1% of vehicle-kilometres were intra-province trips, 20% inter-province trips, 13.8% Canada-US trips and 7.1% trips made outside of Canada.

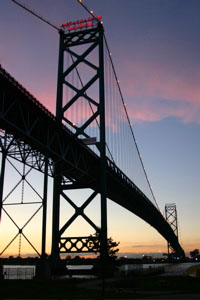
Ambassador Bridge between Windsor, Ontario, and Detroit, Michigan, has a quarter of US–Canada trade cross over it.

Canada's vehicles consumed a total of 31.4 million cubic metres (198 Mbbl) of gasoline and 9.91 million cubic metres (62.3 Mbbl) of diesel. Trucking generated 35% of the total GDP from transport, compared to 25% for rail, water and air combined (the remainder being generated by the industry's transit, pipeline, scenic and support activities). Hence roads are the dominant means of passenger and freight transport in Canada.

Roads and highways were managed by provincial and municipal authorities until construction of the Northwest Highway System (the Alaska Highway) and the Trans-Canada Highway project initiation. The Alaska Highway of 1942 was constructed during World War II for military purposes connecting Fort St. John, British Columbia, with Fairbanks, Alaska. The transcontinental highway, a joint national and provincial expenditure, was begun in 1949 under the initiation of the Trans Canada Highway Act on December 10, 1949. The 7,821-kilometre (4,860 mi) highway was completed in 1962 at a total expenditure of $1.4 billion.

Internationally, Canada has road links with both the lower 48 US states and Alaska. The Ministry of Transportation maintains the road network in Ontario and also employs Ministry of Transport Enforcement Officers for the purpose of administering the Canada Transportation Act and related regulations. The Department of Transportation in New Brunswick performs a similar task in that province as well.

The safety of Canada's roads is moderately good by international standards, and is improving both in terms of accidents per head of population and per billion vehicle kilometers.

== Air transport ==
Air transportation made up 9% of the transport sector's GDP generation in 2005. Canada's largest air carrier and its flag carrier is Air Canada, which had 34 million customers in 2006 and, as of June 2025, operates 322 aircraft (including Air Canada Jazz). CHC Helicopter, the largest commercial helicopter operator in the world, is second with 109 aircraft and WestJet, a low-cost carrier formed in 1996, is third with 155 aircraft. Canada's airline industry saw significant change following the signing of the US–Canada open skies agreement in 1995, when the marketplace became less regulated and more competitive.

According to a 2016 report, Canada's air transportation was the most expensive for consumers globally; however, this was prior to the emergence of ultra-low-cost carriers such as Flair Airlines who operate 20 aircraft as of June 2025.

The Canadian Transportation Agency employs transportation enforcement officers to maintain aircraft safety standards, and conduct periodic aircraft inspections, of all air carriers. The Canadian Air Transport Security Authority is charged with the responsibility for the security of air traffic within Canada. In 1994 the National Airports Policy was enacted

=== Principal airports ===
Of over 1,800 registered Canadian aerodromes, certified airports, heliports, and floatplane bases, 26 are specially designated under Canada's National Airports System (NAS): these include all airports that handle 200,000 or more passengers each year, as well as the principal airport serving each federal, provincial, and territorial capital. However, since the introduction of the policy only one, Iqaluit Airport, has been added and no airports have been removed despite dropping below 200,000 passengers. The Government of Canada, with the exception of the three territorial capitals, retains ownership of these airports and leases them to local authorities. The next tier consists of 64 regional/local airports formerly owned by the federal government, most of which have now been transferred to other owners (most often to municipalities).

Below is a table of Canada's ten biggest airports by passenger traffic in 2019.

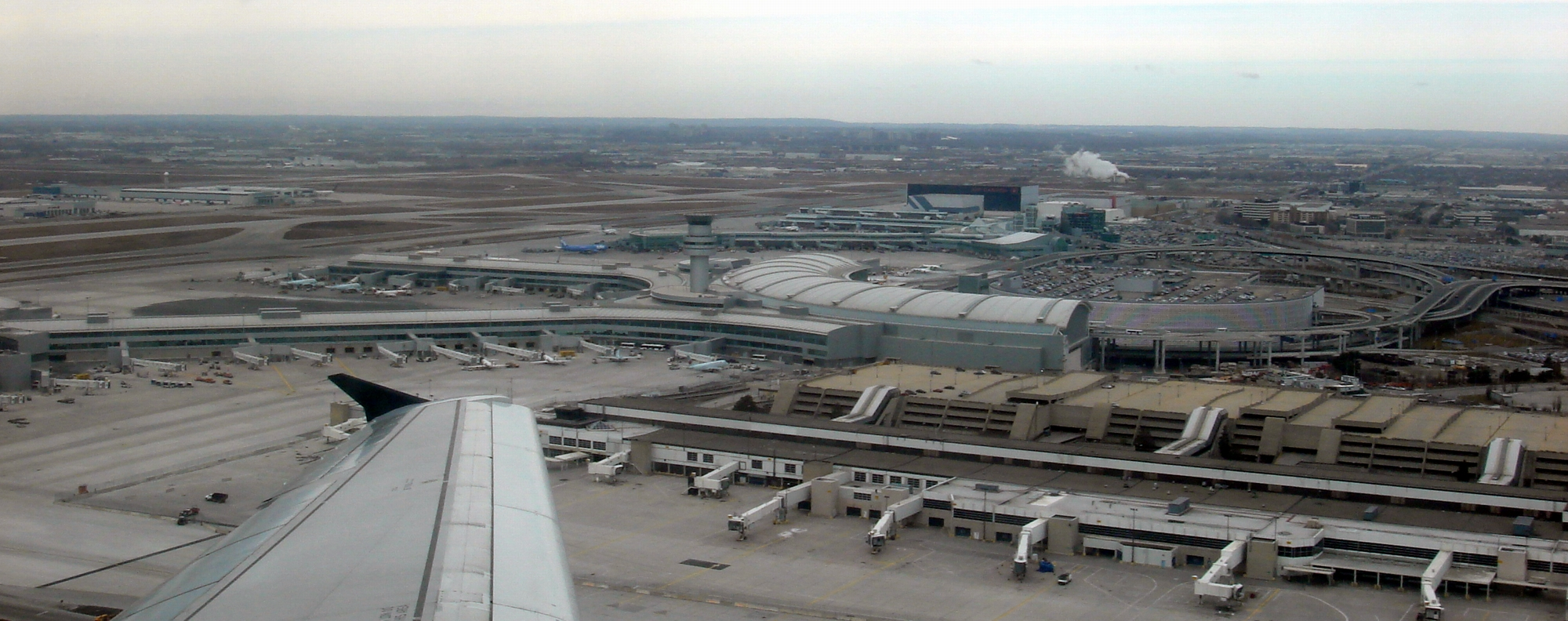
Toronto Pearson, Canada's busiest airport

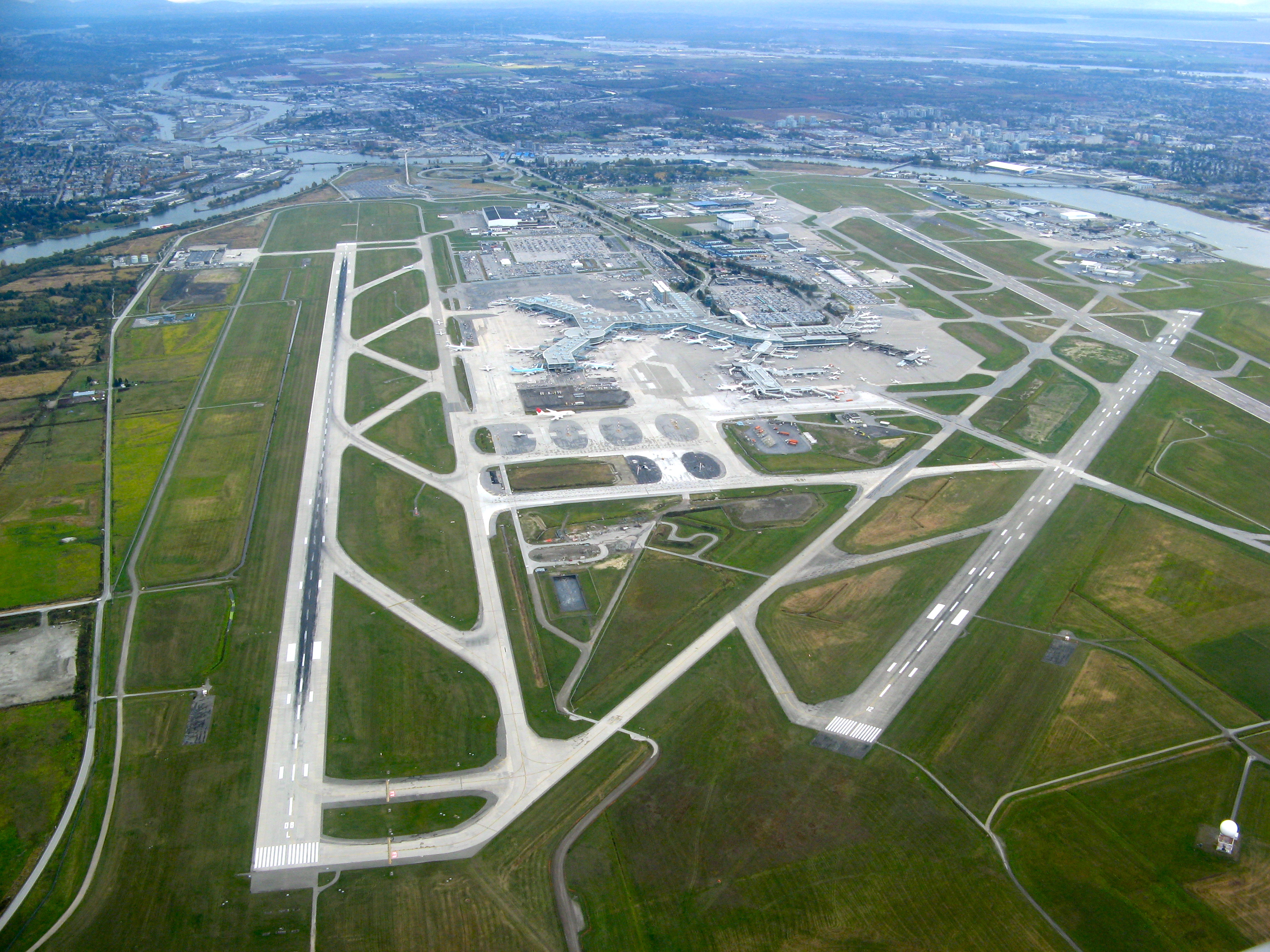
Vancouver International Airport

Rank	Airport	Location	Total passengers	Annual change
1	Toronto Pearson International Airport	Toronto	50,499,431	2.0%
2	Vancouver International Airport	Vancouver	26,395,820	1.8%
3	Montréal-Pierre Elliott Trudeau International Airport	Montreal	20,305,106	4.5%
4	Calgary International Airport	Calgary	17,957,780	3.5%
5	Edmonton International Airport	Edmonton	8,151,532	1.2%
6	Ottawa Macdonald–Cartier International Airport	Ottawa	5,106,487	0.1%
7	Winnipeg James Armstrong Richardson International Airport	Winnipeg	4,484,249	0.0%
8	Halifax Stanfield International Airport	Halifax	4,188,443	3.0%
9	Billy Bishop Toronto City Airport (Toronto Island)	Toronto	-	−
10	Kelowna International Airport	Kelowna	2,032,144	1.3%

== Railways ==
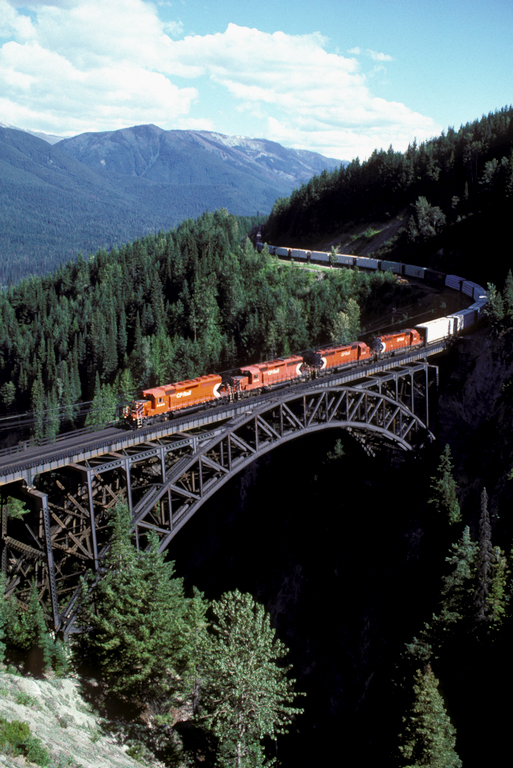
A CPR freight train in Rogers Pass

While intercity passenger transportation by rail is now very limited, freight transport by rail remains common. In 2024, operating revenues for the Canadian rail transportation industry were $21.6 billion, of which $19.5 billion came from freight services. Freight revenues accounted for 90.1% of total operating revenues.

The Canadian National Railway and Canadian Pacific Kansas City are Canada's two major freight railway companies, each having operations throughout North America. In 2024, Canadian railways transported 329.2 million tons of freight, while Via Rail carried 4.4 million passengers.

Nationwide passenger services are provided by the federal crown corporation Via Rail. Via Rail has faced criticism for frequent delays, and low speeds compared to peer countries and historical train travel times, such as the records set by the TurboTrain during the 1970s.

Three Canadian cities have commuter rail services: in the Montreal area by Exo, in the Toronto area by GO Transit, and in the Vancouver area by West Coast Express. Smaller railways such as Ontario Northland, Rocky Mountaineer, and Algoma Central also run passenger trains to remote rural areas.

In Canada, railways are built to standard gauge, 4 ft 8 1/2 in (1,435 mm). See also track gauge in Canada.

Canada has railway links with the lower 48 US states but no rail connection with Alaska, although a line has been proposed. There are no other international rail connections.

== Waterways ==
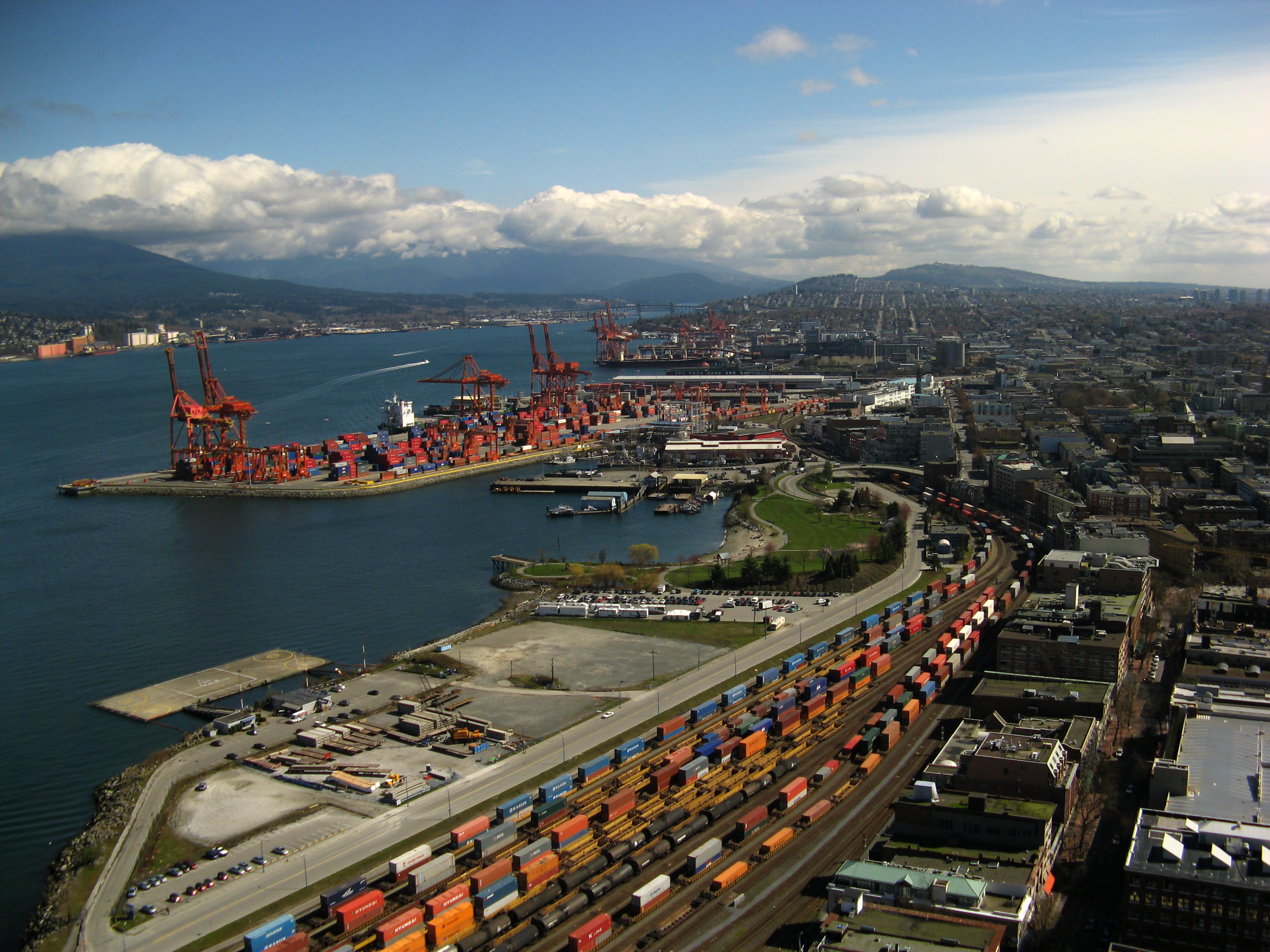
The Port of Vancouver, Canada's busiest port

In 2005, 139.2 million tonnes (137.0 million long tons; 153.4 million short tons) of cargo was loaded and unloaded at Canadian ports. The Port of Vancouver is the busiest port in Canada, moving 68 million tonnes (67 million long tons; 75 million short tons) or 15% of Canada's total in domestic and international shipping in 2003.

Transport Canada oversees most of the regulatory functions related to marine registration, safety of large vessel, and port pilotage duties. Many of Canada's port facilities are in the process of being divested from federal responsibility to other agencies or municipalities.

Inland waterways comprise 3,000 km (1,900 mi), including the St. Lawrence Seaway. Transport Canada enforces acts and regulations governing water transportation and safety.

Container traffic in Canadian ports, 2006
Rank	Port	Province	TEUs	Boxes	Containerized cargo (tonnes)
1	Vancouver	British Columbia	2,207,730	1,282,807	17,640,024
2	Montreal	Quebec	1,288,910	794,735	11,339316
3	Halifax	Nova Scotia	530,722	311,065	4,572,020
4	St. John's	Newfoundland and Labrador	118,008	55,475	512,787
5	Fraser River	British Columbia	94,651	N/A	742,783
6	Saint John	New Brunswick	44,566	24,982	259,459
7	Toronto	Ontario	24,585	24,585	292,834

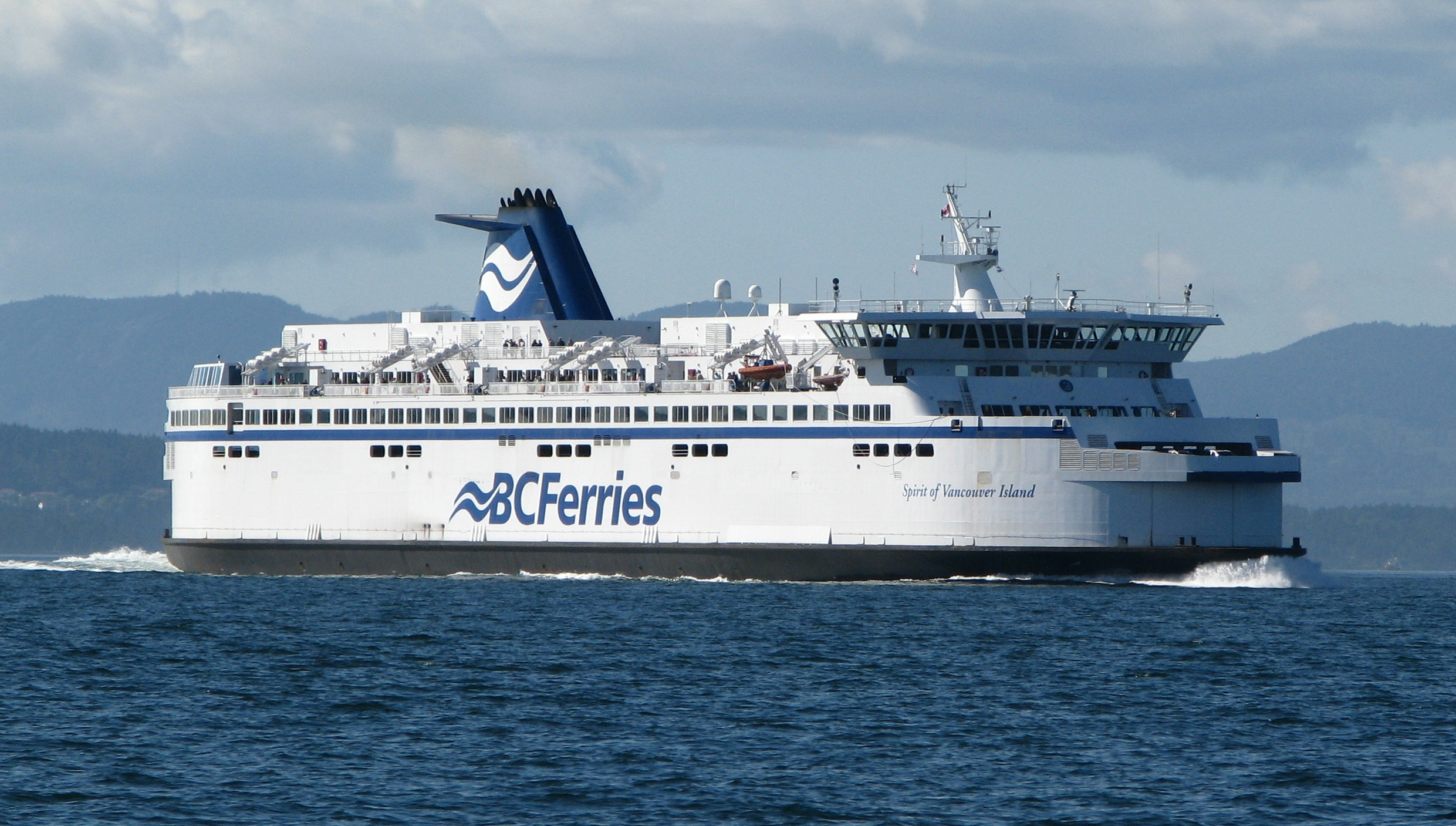
Spirit of Vancouver Island en route to the Tsawwassen ferry terminal from the Swartz Bay ferry terminal

=== Ferry services ===
- Passenger ferry service
  - Vancouver Island and surrounding islands and peninsulas to the British Columbia mainland
  - Several Sunshine Coast communities to the British Columbia mainland and to Alaska
  - Internationally to St. Pierre and Miquelon
- Automobile ferry service
  - Nova Scotia to Newfoundland and Labrador
  - Quebec to Newfoundland across the Strait of Belle Isle
  - Labrador to Newfoundland
  - Chandler to the Magdalen Islands, Quebec
  - Prince Edward Island to the Magdalen Islands, Quebec
  - Prince Edward Island to Nova Scotia
  - Digby, Nova Scotia, to Saint John, New Brunswick

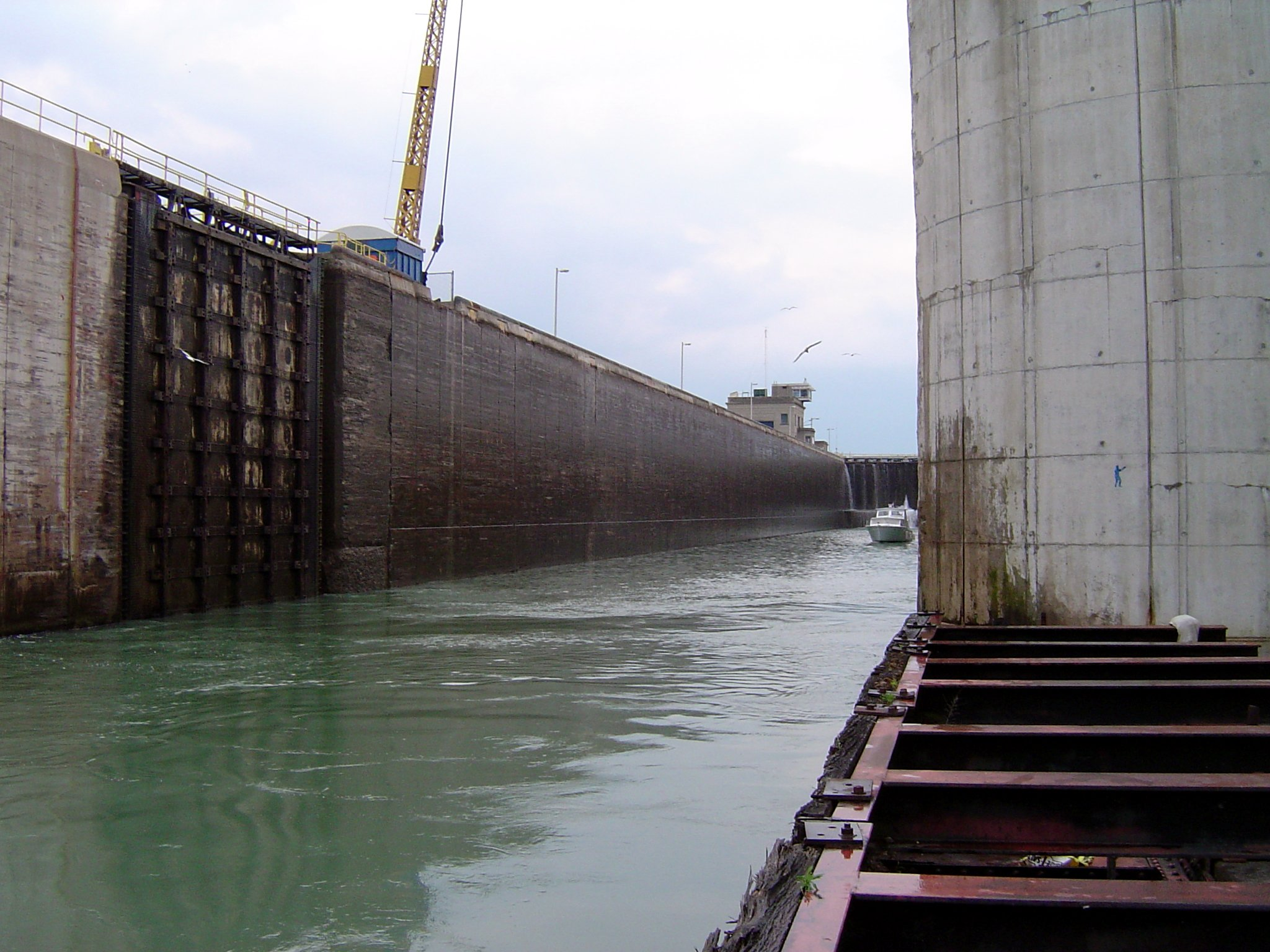
Welland Canal, Port Weller, lock #1

=== Canals ===
The main route canals of Canada are those of the St. Lawrence River and the Great Lakes. The others are subsidiary canals.

- St. Lawrence Seaway
- Welland Canal
- Soo Locks
- Trent-Severn Waterway
- Rideau Canal

=== Ports and harbours ===
The National Harbours Board administered Halifax, Saint John, Chicoutimi, Trois-Rivières, Churchill, and Vancouver until 1983. At one time, over 300 harbours across Canada were supervised by the Department of Transport. A program of divestiture was implemented around the turn of the millennium, and as of 2014, 493 of the 549 sites identified for divestiture in 1995 have been sold or otherwise transferred, as indicated by a DoT list. The government maintains an active divestiture programme, and, after divestiture, Transport Canada oversees only 17 Canada Port Authorities for the 17 largest shipping ports.

==== Pacific coast ====
- Victoria, British Columbia
- Vancouver, British Columbia
- Prince Rupert, British Columbia

==== Atlantic coast ====
- Halifax, Nova Scotia
- Saint John, New Brunswick
- St. John's, Newfoundland and Labrador
- Sept-Îles, Quebec
- Sydney, Nova Scotia
- Botwood, Newfoundland and Labrador

==== Arctic coast ====
- Churchill, Manitoba

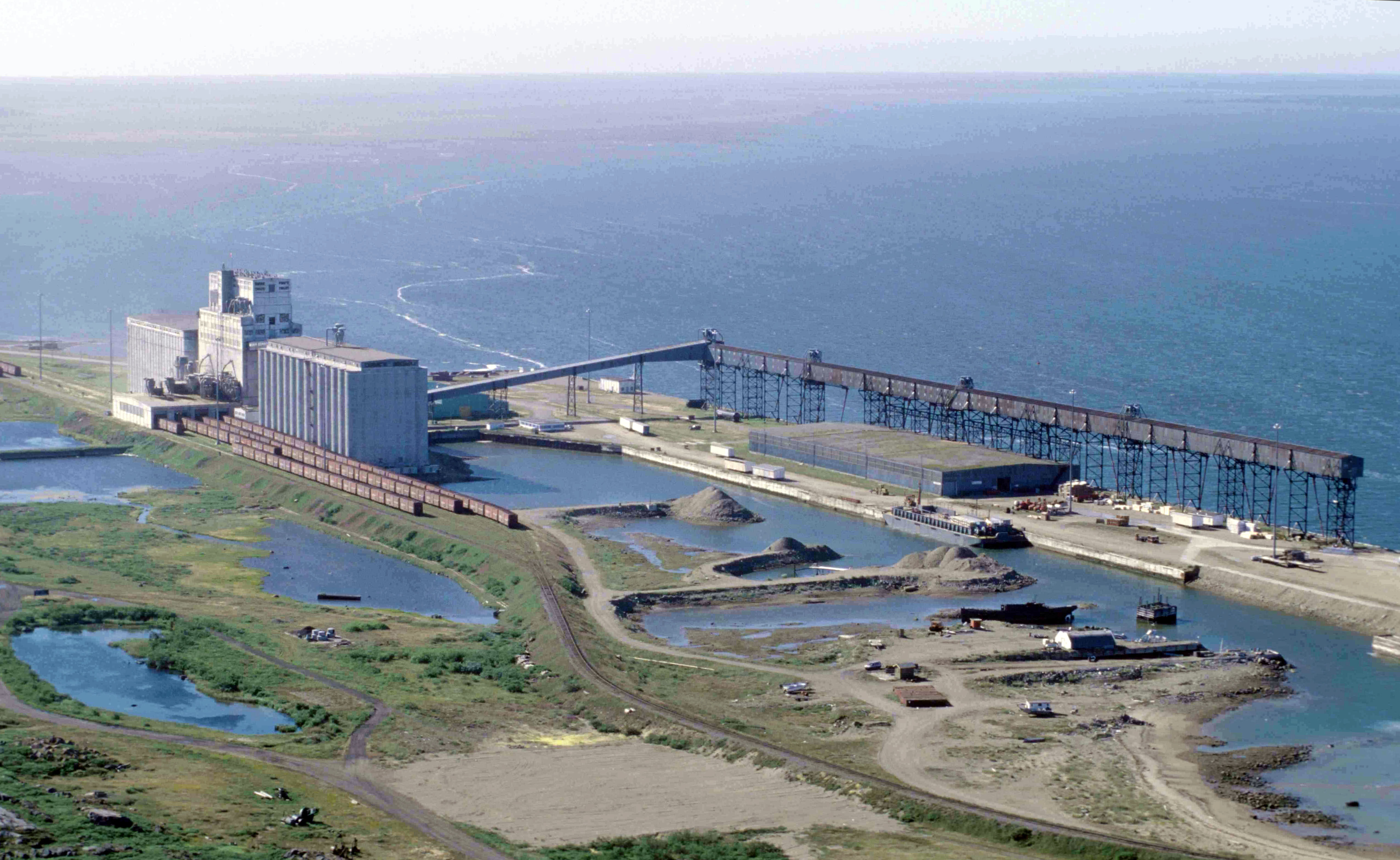
Churchill, Manitoba Seaport

==== Great Lakes and St Lawrence River ====
- Bécancour, Quebec
- Hamilton, Ontario
- Montreal, Quebec
- Quebec City, Quebec
- Trois-Rivières, Quebec
- Thunder Bay, Ontario
- Toronto, Ontario
- Windsor, Ontario

=== Merchant marine ===
Canada's merchant marine comprised a total of 173 ships (1,000 gross tonnage (GT) or over) 2,129,243 GT or 716,340 tonnes deadweight (DWT) at the end of 2007.

== Pipelines ==
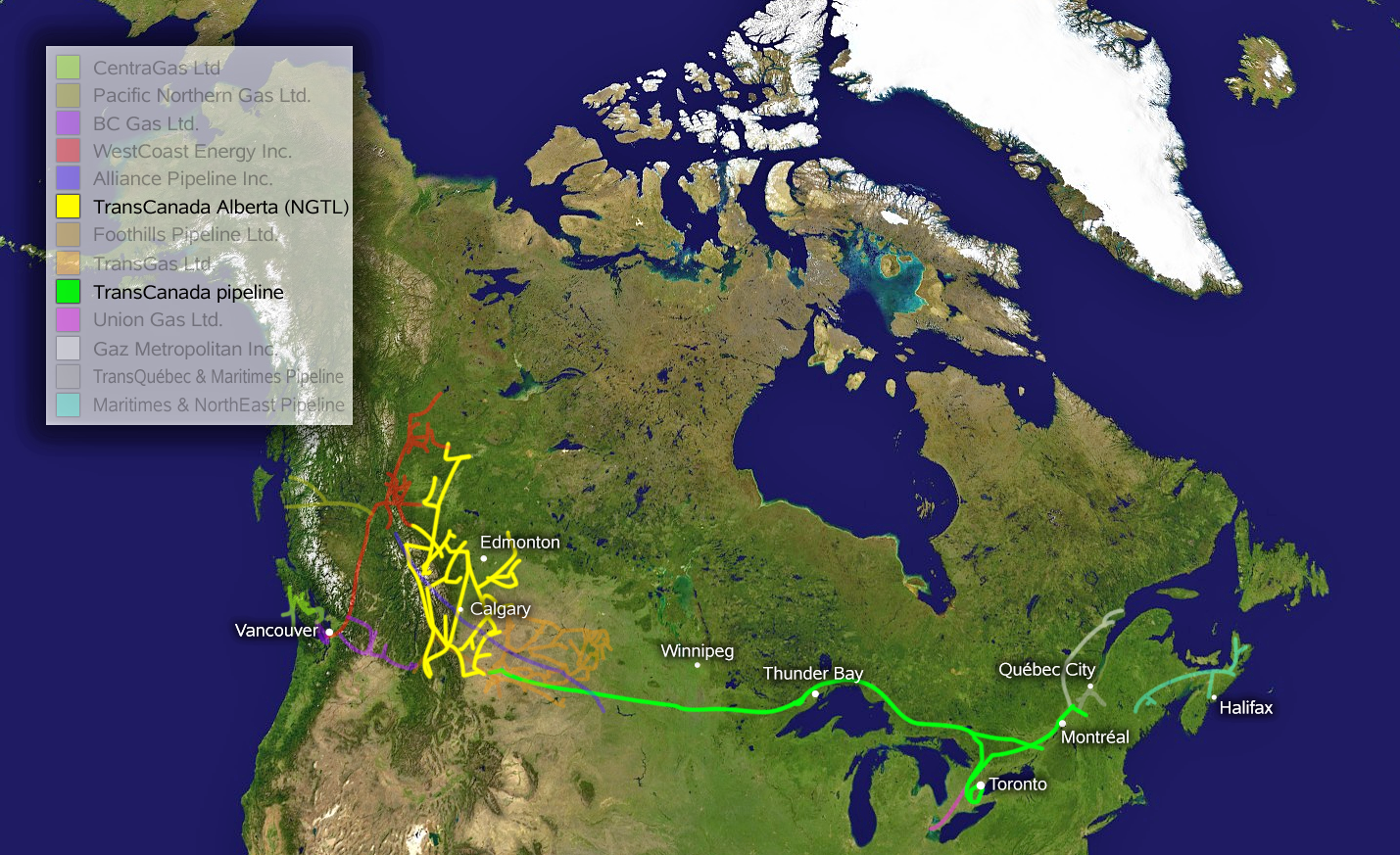
The TransCanada pipeline route

Pipelines are part of the energy extraction and transportation network of Canada and are used to transport natural gas, natural gas liquids, crude oil, synthetic crude and other petroleum based products. Canada has 23,564 km (14,642 mi) of pipeline for transportation of crude and refined oil, and 74,980 km (46,590 mi) for liquefied petroleum gas.

== Public transit ==
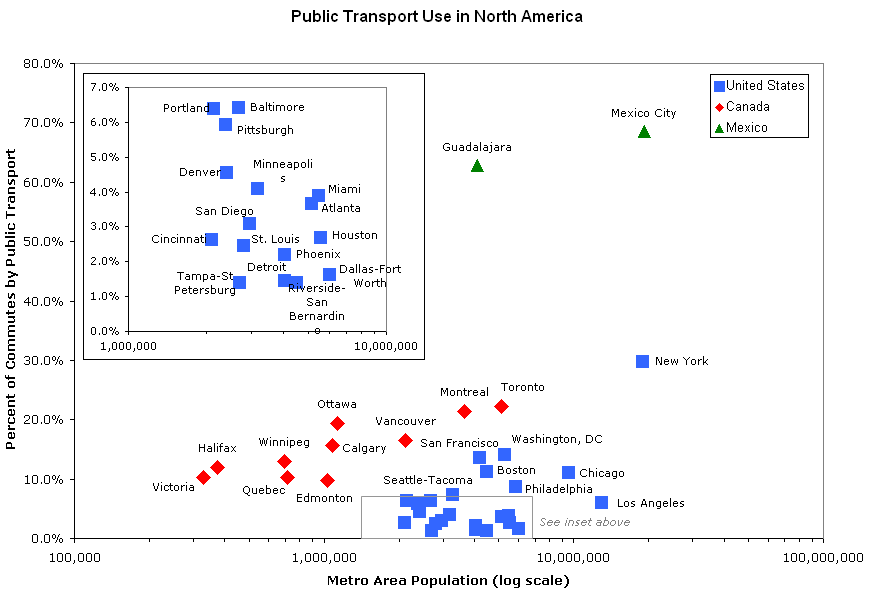
Canadian cities tend to have higher public transit use rates than comparable US cities their size but lower rates than their Mexican counterparts.

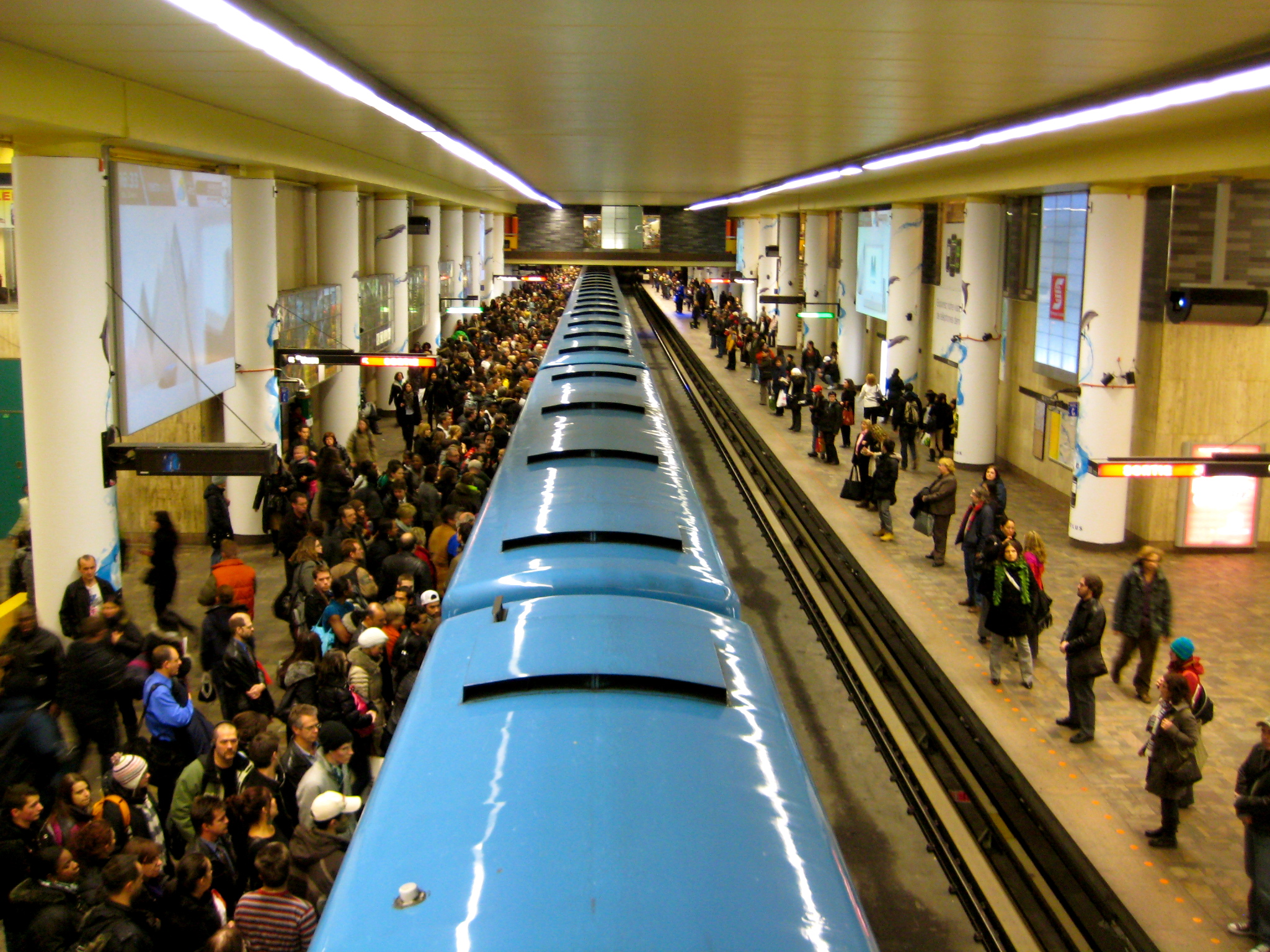
Montreal Metro's McGill station during rush hour

Most Canadian cities have public transport, if only a bus system. Three Canadian cities have rapid transit systems, four have light rail systems, and three have commuter rail systems (see below). In 2016, 12.4% of Canadians used public transportation to get to work. This compares to 79.5% that got to work using a car (67.4% driving alone, 12.1% as part of a carpool), 5.5% that walked and 1.4% that rode a bike.

Government organizations across Canada owned 17,852 buses of various types in 2016. Organizations in Ontario (38.8%) and Quebec (21.9%) accounted for just over three-fifths of the country's total bus fleet. Urban municipalities owned more than 85% of all buses.

in 2016, diesel buses were the leading bus type in Canada (65.9%), followed by bio-diesel (18.1%) and hybrid (9.4%) buses. Electric, natural gas and other buses collectively accounted for the remaining 6.6%.

=== Rapid transit systems ===
There are three rapid transit systems operating in Canada: the Montreal Metro, the Toronto subway, and the Vancouver SkyTrain.

Rapid transit in Canada
Location	Transit	Weekday daily ridership	Length/stations
Montreal, Quebec	Montreal Metro	1,254,700 (Q4 2016)	69.2 km (43.0 mi) / 68
Toronto, Ontario	Toronto subway	1,207,300 (Q4 2016)	100.1 km (62.2 mi) / 109
Vancouver, British Columbia	SkyTrain	454,600 (December 2016)	79.6 km (49.5 mi) / 54

There is also an airport circulator, the Terminal Link, at Toronto Pearson International Airport. It operates 24 hours a day, 7 days a week and is wheelchair-accessible. It is free of cost.

=== Light rail systems ===
There are light rail systems in four cities – the Calgary CTrain, the Edmonton LRT, the Ottawa O-Train, and Waterloo Region's Ion – while Toronto has an extensive streetcar system.

Light rail transit in Canada
Location	Transit	Weekday daily ridership	Length/stations
Toronto, Ontario	Toronto streetcar system	530,600 (Q4 2019)	82 km (51 mi) / 685
Calgary, Alberta	CTrain	313,800 (Q4 2019)	59.9 km (37.2 mi) / 45
Edmonton, Alberta	Edmonton LRT	113,804 (2019)	37.4 km (23.2 mi) / 29
Ottawa, Ontario	O-Train	159,000 (Q4 2019)	20.5 km (12.7 mi) / 18
Waterloo Region, Ontario	Ion rapid transit	N/A	19 km (12 mi) / 19

The 2016 Canada's Core Public Infrastructure Survey from Statistics Canada found that all of Canada's 247 streetcars were owned by the City of Toronto. The vast majority (87.9%) of these streetcars were purchased from 1970 to 1999, while 12.1% were purchased in 2016. Reflecting the age of the streetcars, 88.0% were reported to be in very poor condition, while 12.0% were reported to be in good condition.

=== Commuter train systems ===
Commuter trains serve the cities and surrounding areas of Montreal, Toronto and Vancouver:

Commuter train systems in Canada
Location	Transit	Daily ridership	System length
Toronto, Ontario	GO Transit	187,000 (2013)	390 km (240 mi)
Montreal, Quebec	Agence métropolitaine de transport	83,100 (Q2 2013)	214 km (133 mi)
Vancouver, British Columbia	West Coast Express	11,100 (Q2 2013)	69 km (43 mi)

== See also ==
- Royal Commission on Railways
- The Romance of Transportation in Canada, a National Film Board of Canada animated short
- Taxicabs of Canada
- Plug-in electric vehicles in Canada
