= Thomas Alfred Wardle =

Canadian politician

Ontario MPP
- In office 1971–1975
- Preceded by: John L. Brown
- Succeeded by: Marion Bryden
- Constituency: Beaches-Woodbine

City of Toronto Alderman
- In office 1960–1972
- Preceded by: A.G. Cranham & Alex Hodgins
- Succeeded by: Dorothy Thomas, Reid Scott
- Constituency: The Beaches, Ward 8 (1960–69), Ward 9 (1969–1972)

Personal details
- Born: October 31, 1913 Toronto, Ontario
- Died: June 5, 2005 (aged 91) Toronto, Ontario
- Party: Progressive Conservative

Thomas Alfred Wardle (October 31, 1913 – June 20, 2005) was a Canadian politician, who represented Beaches-Woodbine in the Legislative Assembly of Ontario from 1971 to 1975 as a Progressive Conservative member in the majority government headed by Bill Davis.

Wardle married Inez Evelyn (1913–1997) and they had one son, Tom Wardle Jr. Wardle Snr served in the RCAF during World War II.

Wardle was active in a wide variety of public and private sector roles. He served as a trustee and then as chairman of the Toronto Board of Education. He was also an alderman for The Beaches (ward 8/9) in City of Toronto from 1960 to 1972. His son Tom Jr. was an alderman for the same ward from 1976 to 1980. He served as chairman of the Riverdale Hospital and Foundation.

Wardle is buried with his wife in St. Johns Norway Cemetery, in Toronto.
