= Thomas Alexander Murphy =

Canadian politician (1885–1966)

Ontario MPP
- In office 1926–1948
- Preceded by: New riding
- Succeeded by: Reid Scott
- Constituency: Beaches

Personal details
- Born: May 8, 1885 Lurgan, County Armagh, Ireland
- Died: February 27, 1966 (aged 80) Toronto, Ontario
- Party: Progressive Conservative
- Spouse: Sarah Allister Kirkpatrick (m. 1911)
- Children: 2
- Occupation: Public servant

Thomas Alexander Murphy (May 8, 1885 – February 27, 1966) was an Irish-born politician in Ontario, Canada. He represented Beaches in the Legislative Assembly of Ontario from 1926 to 1948 as a Conservative and later Progressive Conservative member.

== Biography ==
He was born in Lurgan and was educated in Toronto. He worked for the Water Works Department for the city of Toronto from 1906 to 1923. In 1911, Murphy married Sarah Allister Kirkpatrick. He was chair of the Ontario Athletic Commission and president of the Canadian Association of Oarsmen. Murphy also served as vice-president of the National Boxing Association; he was defeated when he ran for reelection in 1928, which led to the Ontario Boxing Federation withdrawing from the National Boxing Association.

Murphy was defeated by Reid Scott when he ran for reelection to the Ontario assembly in 1948. He died in Toronto in 1966 at the age of 80.
