= Marion Bryden =

Canadian politician (1918–2013)

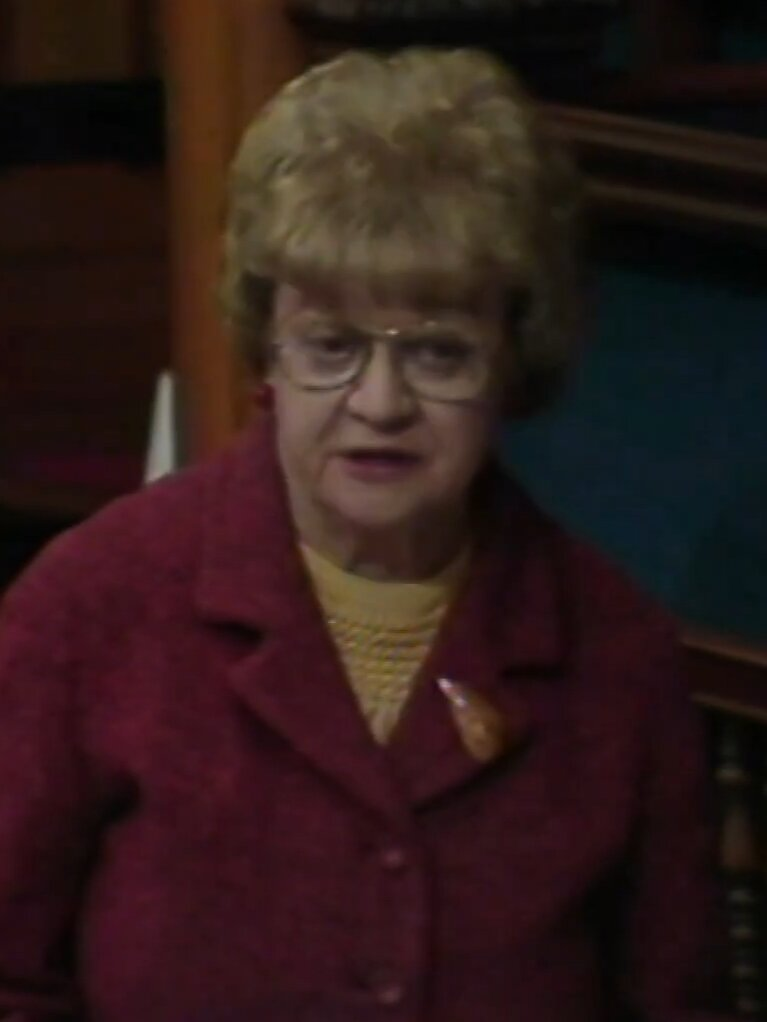
- Bryden in 1986

Ontario MPP
- In office 1975–1990
- Preceded by: Thomas Wardle
- Succeeded by: Frances Lankin
- Constituency: Beaches—Woodbine

Personal details
- Born: 2 April 1918 Winnipeg, Manitoba, Canada
- Died: 12 February 2013 (aged 94) Toronto, Ontario, Canada
- Party: New Democrat
- Spouse: Kenneth Bryden
- Occupation: Researcher, statistician

Marion Helen Bryden (2 April 1918 – 12 February 2013) was a politician in Toronto, Ontario, Canada. She was a New Democratic Party member of the Legislative Assembly of Ontario from 1975 to 1990. Prior to becoming a politician, she was actively involved in the Co-operative Commonwealth Federation and helped found the Ontario New Democratic Party in 1961. She died in Toronto in February 2013 aged 94.

== Background ==
Bryden was educated at the University of Manitoba, the University of Toronto and the Ontario College of Education. She was a member of the Canadian Council of Social Development, the Elizabeth Fry Society, and the Federation of Ontario Naturalists. Bryden was also active as a union organizer, and as a researcher and statistician for the Canadian Tax Federation. During the 1960s, she served as president of the Ontario Woodsworth Memorial Foundation. Her husband, Kenneth Bryden, was a member of the Ontario Legislature from 1959 to 1967.

== Politics ==
Marion Bryden was elected to the Ontario legislature in the 1975 provincial election, defeating incumbent Progressive Conservative Thomas Wardle by 2,650 votes in the riding of Beaches—Woodbine. She faced Wardle again in the 1977 election and defeated him by 2,274 votes. In the 1981 provincial election, Bryden defeated Progressive Conservative Paul Christie by only 324 votes amid provincial setbacks for the NDP. She supported Ian Deans for party leader in 1978 which was won by Michael Cassidy. She supported Bob Rae for the party leadership in 1982.

In 1980, Bryden proposed an environmental bill of rights which would have granted rights to people to challenge polluting companies without first having to prove damages. The bill was blocked by a group of 29 Conservative members. At the time, house rules allowed 20 members to block votes on a private member's bill.

Bryden defeated Christie again by a much greater margin in the 1985 provincial election, and won without difficulty for the redistributed riding of in the 1987 election. She retired prior to the 1990 election, at age seventy-two. The Beaches—Woodbine riding, now renamed as Beaches—East York, remained in NDP hands with Bryden being succeeded by Frances Lankin and then Michael Prue.

From 1985 to 1990, Bryden served as her party's critic for Colleges and Universities, the Solicitor-General, Correctional Services, Seniors' Issues, Revenue and Transport. She was known as an effective constituency representative.

== Books ==
Bryden wrote and co-authored several books and publications in the field of Canadian taxation. These include The costs of tax compliance: a report on a survey conducted by the Canadian Tax Foundation (1961), Occupancy of tax fields in Canada (1965), and Statement to the Royal Commission on Taxation (1964) with A.D. Russell and Gwyneth McGregor.
