= Taxis of Canada =

Taxicabs and other vehicles-for-hire in Canada are regulated by local municipalities and provinces, and are owned & operated by private companies and individuals. Unlicensed cabs in some cities are referred to as bandit taxis/cabs.

In the late 2010s into the 2020s, the Canadian taxi industry has faced competition from ridesharing services (also known as ride-hailing services or transportation network services), such as Uber and Lyft, which have been welcomed in some cities. Some jurisdictions have enacted regulations or taken legal action to explicitly prevent the operation of ridesharing services; some have treated them as unlicensed “bandit” taxis and have taken law enforcement action against them; and others enacted or revised bylaws (or have considered doing so) to allow the licensing and operation of ride-sharing within their jurisdictions.

== Alberta ==
- In Calgary, cabs are licensed by the city government. Unlicensed cabs in the city are referred to as bandit taxis. As of 1 June 2017, there were at least 400 taxi stands and 2,164 taxicabs in the city. All reported cases are treated by the City of Calgary
- In Edmonton, licensed cabs are required to have an "Edmonton Taxi" plate, a City of Edmonton inspection sticker displayed in the vehicle, a city driver’s license displayed; a fully visible meter; and unit number decals on the rear side panel and back bumper.

== British Columbia ==
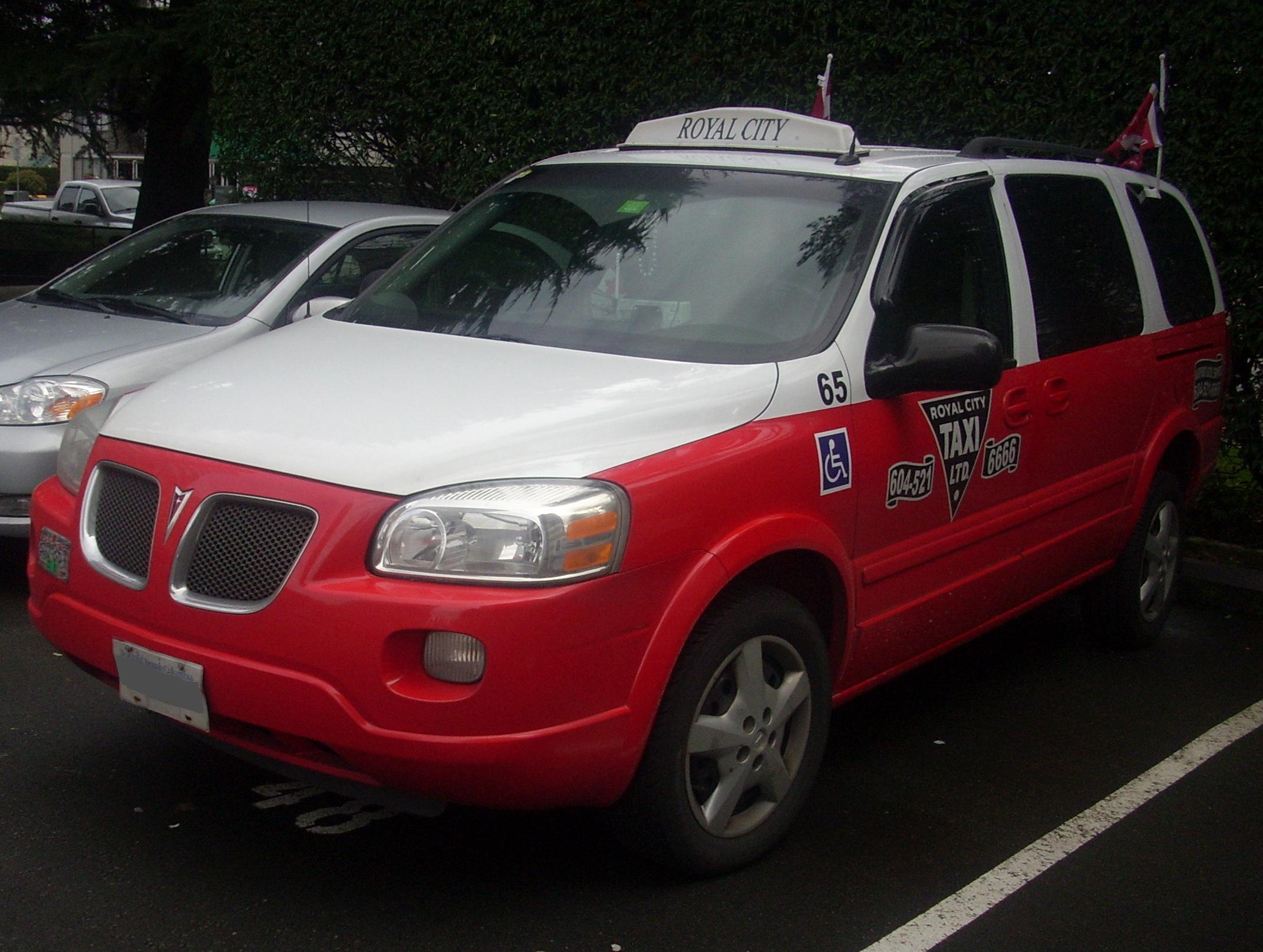
A 2005 Pontiac Montana taxicab from New Westminster, BC.

The Government of British Columbia, via the Passenger Transportation Board, offers a "inter-municipal business license" (IMBL) to ride-hailing companies that wish to operate across municipalities in the Lower Mainland region of BC.

In addition to Vancouver, participating municipalities in the IMBL program include: Abbotsford, Anmore, Bowen Island, Burnaby, Chilliwack, Coquitlam, Delta, Harrison Hot Springs, City of Langley, Township of Langley, Lions Bay, Maple Ridge, New Westminster, City of North Vancouver, District of North Vancouver, Pitt Meadows, Port Coquitlam, Port Moody, Richmond, Squamish, Surrey, West Vancouver, Whistler, and White Rock.

The following "ride hailing" companies are licensed to operate in the region: Apt Rides, Kabu, Lyft, Uber, and Whistle.

=== Vancouver ===
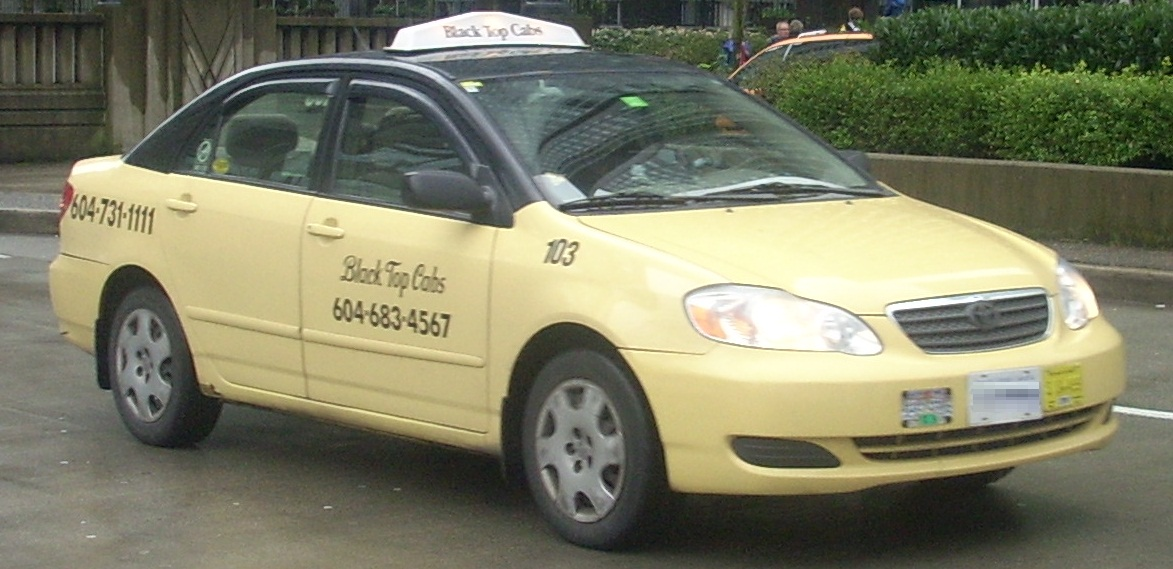
A 2005-08 Vancouver Toyota Corolla taxicab.

In Vancouver, BC, taxicabs are allowed to operate within the Vancouver area, including Vancouver International Airport and Vancouver Island. The Vancouver taxi industry is regulated by both the City's Vehicles for Hire by-law and the provincial Passenger Transportation Board.

Prior to the current Vehicles for Hire by-law, the operations and conduct of cab drivers were formerly ruled by the City Bylaw 6066.

In 2015, regulations in Vancouver prevented the operation of ridesharing services in the city, and four taxi companies took the opportunity to jointly launch a software app that allowed passengers to request and track taxis, pay with their credit card, and rate their driver.

Ridesharing has since been welcomed in the city, and the following "ride hailing" companies are licensed to operate in Vancouver: Apt Rides, Kabu, Lyft, Uber, and Whistle.

== Manitoba ==
Individual municipalities are responsibility for regulation and oversight of local taxicab industries in Manitoba.

On November 9, 2017, the province passed Bill 30—The Local Vehicles for Hire Act—which took effect on February 28, 2018. One part of the legislation applies the bylaw of the municipality in which the vehicle-for-hire trip begins. For example, a trip beginning in Winnipeg and ending in Selkirk would operate under Winnipeg's bylaws.

=== Winnipeg ===
Taxicabs and other vehicles for hire (VFH) in Winnipeg are overseen by the city's Vehicle for Hire Office, which succeeded the provincial Taxicab Board. Ridesharing services in the city are referred to as "Personal Transportation Providers" (PTPs), which also includes limousines.

Only taxis and accessible taxis can be hailed from the street, and limousines can only be hailed at the airport.

Responsibility for oversight of the taxicab industry in Winnipeg was originally given to the Government of Manitoba, which remained until 2017, bringing Winnipeg in line with other municipalities in the province. The Taxicab Board was established by the Government of Manitoba in 1935, operating under and enforcing the Taxicab Act. In December 2016, the provincial government published MNP LLP’s report on Winnipeg Taxicab Services along with 40 recommendations for improving the VFH industry. On November 9, 2017, the Province of Manitoba passed Bill 30—The Local Vehicles for Hire Act—which dissolved the existing Taxicab Board, the Taxicab Act, and associated regulations, and transitioned oversight and regulation of the vehicle-for-hire industry to the City of Winnipeg, effective February 28, 2018.

On December 13, 2017, Winnipeg City Council introduced several amendments to the Vehicles for Hire By-law, which now includes taxicabs, limousines, accessible transport vehicles, and Personal Transportation Providers.

== Ontario ==
=== Ottawa ===
In Ottawa, Ontario, there are over 1,100 licensed taxis and more than 2,000 licensed drivers. A taxicab driver's license and a taxi plate are required to operate a taxicab in the city, which are licensed by the Ottawa's Business Licensing Centre. Taximeter rates are set by the City as well.

Ottawa has also welcomed ridesharing services in the city.

On 13 April 2016, Ottawa City Council approved a report that called for the development of the Vehicle-for-Hire By-law (No. 2016-272), which went into effect on September 30 that year. The by-law incorporated modernized regulations that better enabled the city's traditional taxi industry to compete with private transportation companies, such as ridesharing services. Among other things, it included:

- "allowing taxi companies to offer reduced fair for ride booked through app;"
- "providing exclusive rights to taxis for street-hails and use of taxi stands;" and
- "retaining exclusivity for Para Transpo services"

Taxicabs licensed by the City of Ottawa include:

- Blue Line Taxi Co. Ltd
- Capital Taxi
- West-Way Taxi
- Executive Cabs

=== Toronto ===
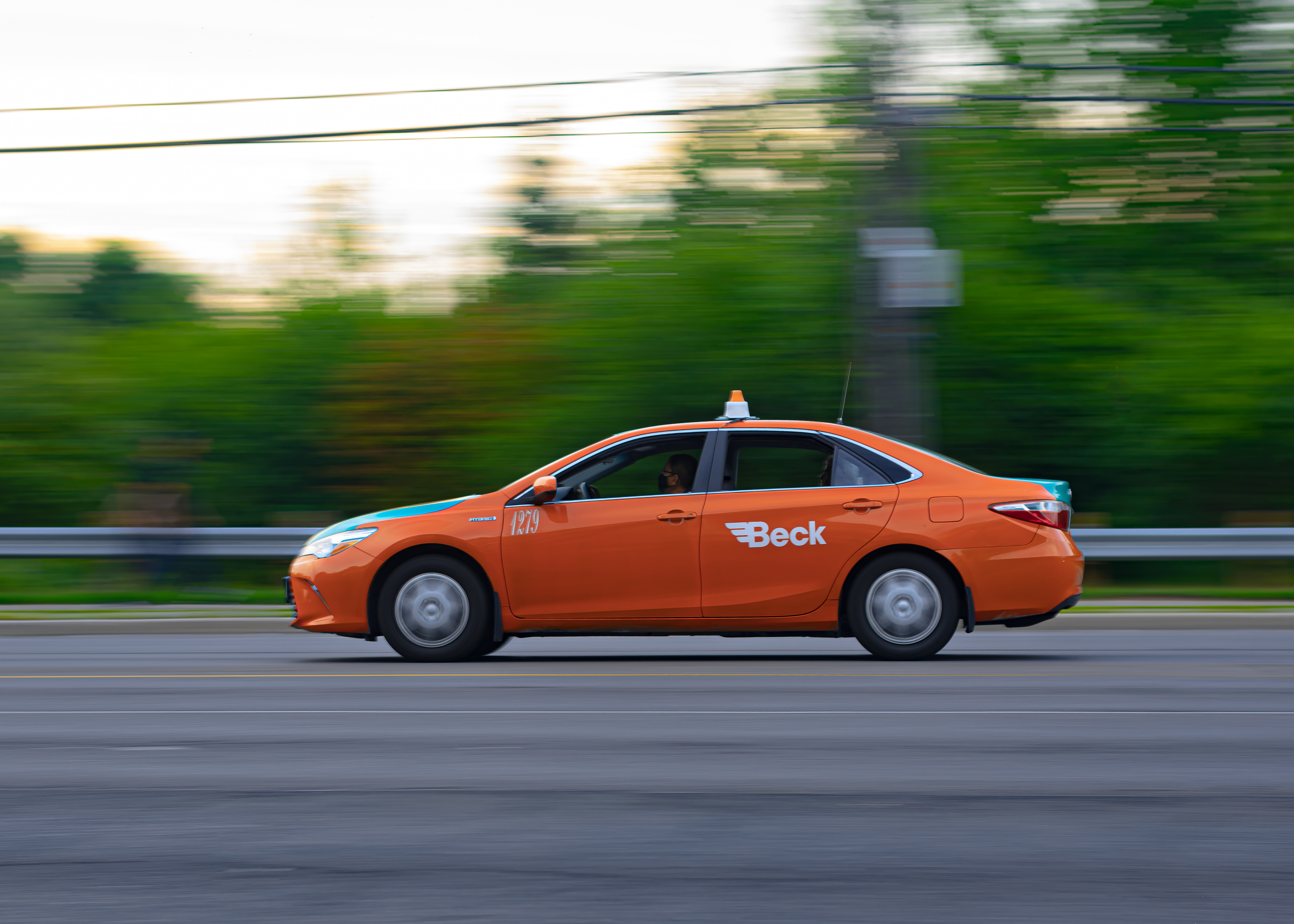
Beck Taxi in the streets of Toronto.

Taxicabs in the Greater Toronto area can operate within the GTA, but are licensed in the municipality where the operations are based. Cabs are required to attach a metal plate with the license number in the back of their vehicles. There are a handful of companies licensed in York Region and Peel Region, but most operate out of Toronto.

The Toronto Licensing Commission is responsible for issuing taxi licenses in Toronto. The city also offers taxi and limousine training courses since the late 1990s to improve the quality of service offered by Toronto cabs. Ambassador Taxicabs are cabs that are required to have higher standards than regular cabs and are available to current cab drivers with a special 40-day training course.

As of 2014, there are 4,849 registered taxicabs in Toronto, of which 1,313 hold Ambassador Licences. There are over 15,000 people employed in the taxicab industry and an estimated 65,000 trips occur daily, generating an estimated 1.5 million dollars each day. Ridership is expected to increase by 10% over the next 10 years and an additional 2.1 million fares by 2022.

Limo cabs are allowed to drop off passengers at Toronto Pearson International Airport, but they cannot pick up fares without an additional permit. The Greater Toronto Airport Authority issues licenses and guidelines for cabs and limos at the airport. Since 2007 the City of Toronto Act restricted non-Toronto cabs from picking up fares in Toronto unless they are licensed to operate in the city. Taxis & Limousine can be pre arranged at the Pearson airport with Child Carseats in advance. It is a little procedure one has to follow for pre-arrange reservations. Toronto Airport Limousines use flat rates issued by the Greater Toronto Airport Authorities.

Toronto has the highest amount of foreign born taxi drivers in the world. As of 2014, 96 percent of taxi drivers are immigrants, a number higher than other large cities like New York City (82%), Dubai (90%), Chicago (62%), London (79%) or Miami (86%). The majority of taxi drivers in Toronto are of South Asian or African descent. Many immigrant taxi drivers have university degrees (20% with undergraduate or master's degrees compared to 4% of Canadian-born drivers) or advanced skills, which has led to criticism of Canada's immigration system. The biggest taxi brokerage in the city, as well as the largest in North America, is Beck Taxi.

== Quebec ==
=== Montreal ===
Taxis in Montreal were once licensed and managed by the city and was pasted on the Bureau du taxi et du remorquage (Taxi and Towing Office), an independent agency created in 1986 and began service in 1987.

There are 420 taxi stands and 4,445 taxi cabs in the city of Montreal.

Enforcement and complaints are treated by the Montréal Police Service (SPVM)
