= Bert Leavens =

Canadian politician

Ontario MPP
- In office 1943–1945
- Preceded by: Goldwin Corlett Elgie
- Succeeded by: Goldwin Corlett Elgie
- In office 1948–1951
- Preceded by: Goldwin Corlett Elgie
- Succeeded by: Harold Fishleigh
- Constituency: Woodbine

Personal details
- Born: March 2, 1886 Owen Sound, Ontario
- Died: December 22, 1953 (aged 67) Toronto, Ontario
- Party: Co-operative Commonwealth Federation
- Occupation: Union leader, cabinetmaker

Bertram Elijah Leavens (March 2, 1886 – December 22, 1953) was a politician in Ontario, Canada. He served as a CCF member of the Legislative Assembly of Ontario from 1943 to 1945 and 1948 to 1951. He represented the downtown Toronto riding of Woodbine.

== Background ==
The son of John Wesley Leavens and Elizabeth Haycroft, he was born in Owen Sound, Ontario.

Bertram married Myrtle May Leavens (née Webb) on September 11, 1911, in Owen Sound, Ontario. They had 3 sons (William John (1912–1982), Bertram Elijah (1918-1918) and Charles Wesley (1920–1976)) and a daughter (Eva Lorraine (1914–1974)).

Leavens worked as a cabinetmaker. He was at one point a Sunday school superintendent, but he later became the most active leader and organizer of the Rationalist Society of Canada in the late 1920s and early 1930s, regularly delivering anti-religious lectures.

== Politics ==
Leavens ran unsuccessfully for the Greenwood seat in the Canadian House of Commons in 1935 and 1940 as a CCF candidate, losing both times to Denton Massey.

In the 1943 provincial election, he ran as a CCF candidate in the downtown Toronto riding of Woodbine.
