= William Collings (politician) =

Canadian politician

Ontario MPP
- In office 1951–1961
- Preceded by: Reid Scott
- Succeeded by: Jack Harris
- Constituency: Beaches

Personal details
- Born: July 6, 1899 York County, Ontario, Canada
- Died: March 7, 1961 (aged 61) Toronto, Ontario, Canada
- Party: Progressive Conservative
- Children: 3

William Henry Collings (July 6, 1899 – March 7, 1961), a Canadian politician, represented Beaches in the Legislative Assembly of Ontario from 1951 to 1961 as a Progressive Conservative member.

== Background ==
Collings was born in York County, Ontario to Thomas Collings and Elizabeth Ann Mortimore. He was one of the last members of the Orange Lodge to win political office, municipally or provincially. He had two sons and one daughter.

== Politics ==
=== Municipal ===
Collings was elected as an Alderman representing Ward 8 on Toronto City Council in 1948. He was re-elected in 1949 but, in 1950, he was unsuccessful in an effort to secure a position on the Toronto Board of Control.

=== Provincial ===
He was elected in the general election in 1951 and was re-elected in the general elections in 1955 and 1959 but died in office halfway through his third term. During his first term in office, he served on variety of Standing Committees and he was elected Chair of two Select Committees - the Select Committee on Election Laws and the Select Committee on the Representation Act. He served as a member of more Standing Committees after the 1955 and 1959 elections, sitting on up to ten committees, simultaneously.

In 1955, Collings was appointed as the Chief Commissioner of the Liquor Control Board of Ontario and served in that role until his death. He was credited with many of the steps taken to liberalize the advertising and promotion of alcoholic products in Ontario. He was credited by Premier John Robarts as being one of the principal authors of the legislation which created the City of Metropolitan Toronto in 1953.

=== Provincial electoral record ===
1951 Ontario general election
Party	Candidate	Votes	Vote %
Conservative	William Henry Collings	9,573	49.4
Co-operative Commonwealth	Reid Scott	6,958	35.9
Liberal	W. Earl Upper	2,864	14.8
	Total	19,395	

1955 Ontario general election
Party	Candidate	Votes	Vote %
Conservative	William Henry Collings	7,835	48.1
Co-operative Commonwealth	Reid Scott	5,887	36.1
Liberal	E.R. Hoolans	2,566	15.8
	Total	16,288	

1959 Ontario general election
Party	Candidate	Votes	Vote %
Conservative	William Henry Collings	7,310	46.1
Co-operative Commonwealth	Stanley T. Bullock	4,396	27.7
Liberal	Ronald Pickering	4,157	26.2
	Total	15,863	
