= Goldwin Corlett Elgie =

Canadian politician

Ontario MPP
- In office 1945–1948
- Preceded by: Bert Leavens
- Succeeded by: Bert Leavens
- In office 1934–1943
- Preceded by: George Sylvester Shields
- Succeeded by: Bert Leavens
- Constituency: Woodbine

Personal details
- Born: July 21, 1896; Dresden, Ontario
- Died: April 4, 1975 (aged 78); Toronto, Ontario
- Political party: Conservative 1934-1943; Progressive Conservative 1945-1948
- Spouse: Vivian Granger McHenry (m.1921)
- Occupation: Lawyer

Goldwin Corlett Elgie (July 21, 1896 – April 4, 1975) was a lawyer and political figure in Ontario. He represented Woodbine in the Legislative Assembly of Ontario from 1934 to 1943 and from 1945 to 1948 as a Conservative and then Progressive Conservative member.

He was born in Dresden, the son of George Albert Elgie and Margaret Elizabeth Corlett, and was educated in Dresden, at Albert College, University of Western Ontario and Osgoode Hall. In 1921, he married Vivian Granger McHenry.

In 1937, Elgie proposed legislation that would have allowed passengers to sue a driver for negligence in the event of an accident. The proposed bill was rejected by the Liberal government of the time.

His son Robert also served in the Ontario assembly. He died in Toronto in 1975.
