= John L. Brown (Ontario politician) =

Canadian politician

John Brown

Ontario MPP
- In office 1967–1971
- Preceded by: New riding
- Succeeded by: Thomas Alfred Wardle
- Constituency: Beaches-Woodbine

Personal details
- Born: June 10, 1921 Kidder, South Dakota, United States
- Died: October 20, 2004 (aged 82) St. John's, Newfoundland and Labrador
- Party: New Democrat
- Occupation: Child care worker

John Leroy Brown (June 10, 1921 – October 20, 2004) was a Canadian politician, who represented the newly created riding of Beaches-Woodbine in the Legislative Assembly of Ontario from 1967 to 1971 as a NDP member.

He was born in Kidder, South Dakota, United States, to Neal J. Brown and Martha Henpim. Brown was an opposition member during a majority Progressive Conservative government led by Premier Bill Davis. He served on six Standing Committees of the Legislative Assembly, including Health and Education and University Affairs. He was a businessman and the founder of Browndale, a company that worked with "emotionally disturbed children". He died in 2004 while on a visit to Newfoundland.
