= Beaches—Woodbine (provincial electoral district) =

Former provincial electoral district in Ontario, Canada

Ontario electoral district

Defunct provincial electoral district
- Legislature: Legislative Assembly of Ontario
- District created: 1966
- District abolished: 1996
- First contested: 1967
- Last contested: 1995

Demographics
- Census division: Toronto
- Census subdivision: Toronto

Beaches—Woodbine was a provincial electoral district in Ontario, Canada. It was created in 1967 by merging the former ridings of Woodbine and Beaches.

== Boundaries ==
The riding was created prior to the 1967 election by combining the ridings of Woodbine and Beaches. The boundaries of the new riding were as follows: From the southwest point where Coxwell Avenue met Lake Ontario the boundary followed Coxwell north to Queen Street East. It then went west a short distance to Rhodes Avenue. It followed Rhodes Avenue north to Danforth Avenue. It then went back east along Danforth to Coxwell. It then went north along Coxwell to the city limits. Along the north it followed the city limits until it reached Victoria Park Avenue. It then went south along Victoria Park and along the same line until it reached Lake Ontario.

In 1974 the eastern boundary with Riverdale was altered. The border now consisted of Coxwell Avenue from Lake Ontario north to the railway right-of-way just south of Hanson Street. The boundary followed the right-of-way west until Greenwood Avenue. It then went north along Greenwood until it met the city limits.

From 1987 to 1999 it consisted of Old Toronto east from where Leslie Street meets the lake north to Queen Street. It then followed Queen Street east to Greenwood Avenue and then north to the CN railway. Following the CN right of way to Coxwell Avenue it then went north to the city limits.

In 1999, it was absorbed into the new ridings of Beaches—East York and Toronto—Danforth.

== Members of Provincial Parliament ==
Beaches—Woodbine
Assembly	Years	Member	Party
Created from parts of Woodbine and Beaches
28th	1967–1971	John Brown	New Democratic
29th	1971–1975	Tom Wardle	Progressive Conservative
30th	1975–1977	Marion Bryden	New Democratic
31st	1977–1981	Marion Bryden	New Democratic
32nd	1981–1985	Marion Bryden	New Democratic
33rd	1985–1987	Marion Bryden	New Democratic
34th	1987–1990	Marion Bryden	New Democratic
35th	1990–1995	Frances Lankin	New Democratic
36th	1995–1999	Frances Lankin	New Democratic
Sourced from the Ontario Legislative Assembly
Merged into Beaches—East York and Toronto—Danforth

== Election results ==
1995 Ontario general election
Party	Candidate	Votes	%	±%
New Democratic	Frances Lankin	10,862	42.44	–15.91
Progressive Conservative	Lynda Buffett	7,923	30.96	+16.61
Liberal	Stephen Lautens	6,158	24.06	–1.62
Independent	Brad Allen	319	1.25	–
Communist	Miguel Figueroa	169	0.66	–
Natural Law	Donalda Fredeen	162	0.63	–
Total valid votes		25,593	98.95	
Total rejected, unmarked and declined ballots		272	1.05	–0.72
Turnout		25,865	67.14	+1.19
Eligible voters		38,523		
New Democratic hold		Swing		–16.26
Source: Elections Ontario

1990 Ontario general election
Party	Candidate	Votes	%	±%
New Democratic	Frances Lankin	14,381	58.35	+8.61
Liberal	Beryl Potter	6,329	25.68	–9.78
Progressive Conservative	Kevin Bruce Forrest	3,535	14.34	+1.76
Independent	Sam Salvatore Vitulli	400	1.62	–
Total valid votes		24,645	98.23	
Total rejected, unmarked and declined ballots		445	1.77	+1.13
Turnout		25,090	65.95	+4.26
Eligible voters		38,045		
New Democratic hold		Swing		+9.20
Source: Elections Ontario

1987 Ontario general election
Party	Candidate	Votes	%	±%
New Democratic	Marion Bryden	11,948	49.74	–0.09
Liberal	Patricia Herdman	8,519	35.46	+15.55
Progressive Conservative	John Beveridge	3,022	12.58	–16.13
Libertarian	Steven Thistle	533	2.22	+0.66
Total valid votes		24,022	99.35	
Total rejected ballots		156	0.65	+0.10
Turnout		24,178	61.69	–3.33
Eligible voters		39,194		
New Democratic hold		Swing		–7.82
Source: Elections Ontario

1985 Ontario general election
Party	Candidate	Votes	%	±%
New Democratic	Marion Bryden	12,672	49.82	+6.72
Progressive Conservative	Paul Christie	7,301	28.71	–12.94
Liberal	Sally Kelly	5,065	19.91	+5.80
Libertarian	Steven Thistle	396	1.56	–
Total valid votes		25,434	99.46	
Total rejected ballots		139	0.54	–0.06
Turnout		25,573	65.02	+5.88
Eligible voters		39,332		
New Democratic hold		Swing		+9.83
Source: Elections Ontario

1981 Ontario general election
Party	Candidate	Votes	%	±%
New Democratic	Marion Bryden	9,590	43.10	–3.40
Progressive Conservative	Paul Christie	9,266	41.65	+4.34
Liberal	Wayne Cook	3,140	14.11	–0.37
Independent	Peter (Rhino) Flosznik	252	1.13	–
Total valid votes		22,248	99.39	
Total rejected ballots		136	0.61	–0.11
Turnout		22,384	59.14	–5.61
Eligible voters		37,850		
New Democratic hold		Swing		–3.87
Source: Elections Ontario

1977 Ontario general election
Party	Candidate	Votes	%	±%
New Democratic	Marion Bryden	11,491	46.51	+0.93
Progressive Conservative	Thomas Alfred Wardle	9,217	37.31	+3.20
Liberal	Ernest E. Barr	3,579	14.49	–5.06
Independent	George Alexander Leslie	203	0.82	–
Communist	Gerrit Van Houten	114	0.46	–0.31
Libertarian	Shirley Yamada	103	0.42	–
Total valid votes		24,707	99.28	
Total rejected ballots		179	0.72	+0.23
Turnout		24,886	64.75	–1.79
Eligible voters		38,432		
New Democratic hold		Swing		–1.14
Source: Elections Ontario

1975 Ontario general election
Party	Candidate	Votes	%	±%
New Democratic	Marion Bryden	11,462	45.58	+5.74
Progressive Conservative	Thomas Alfred Wardle	8,576	34.10	–15.14
Liberal	Ken Koury	4,914	19.54	+9.46
Communist	Christian Negre	195	0.78	–
Total valid votes		25,147	99.51	
Total rejected ballots		124	0.49	–0.07
Turnout		25,271	66.55	–7.18
Eligible voters		37,974		
New Democratic gain from Progressive Conservative		Swing		+10.44
Source: Elections Ontario

1971 Ontario general election
Party	Candidate	Votes	%	±%
Progressive Conservative	Thomas Alfred Wardle	13,768	49.25	+7.92
New Democratic	Bruce Kidd	11,138	39.84	–3.74
Liberal	Jerry Ewins	2,819	10.08	–5.02
Social Credit	Alan John Overfield	145	0.52	–
Independent	Harold Rowbottom	88	0.31	–
Total valid votes		27,958	99.44	
Total rejected ballots		157	0.56	–0.12
Turnout		28,115	73.73	+6.95
Eligible voters		38,131		
Progressive Conservative gain from New Democratic		Swing		+5.83
Source: Elections Ontario

1967 Ontario general election
Party	Candidate	Votes	%
New Democratic	John L. Brown	10,522	43.58
Progressive Conservative	Jack Harris	9,977	41.32
Liberal	Joe Fullerton	3,646	15.10
Total valid votes		24,145	99.32
Total rejected ballots		165	0.68
Turnout		24,310	66.78
Eligible voters		36,401	
New Democratic pickup new district.			
Source: Elections Ontario

== See also ==
- List of Ontario provincial electoral districts
- Canadian provincial electoral districts
