= Paul Christie (politician) =

Paul Christie (born March 1952) is a municipal politician, administrator and corporate director in Ontario, Canada. He served as a member of Toronto City Council and Metropolitan Toronto Council for the Metro ward of East Toronto from 1985 to 1997, as Commissioner and Chair of the TTC from 1991 until 1998 and as supervisor of the Toronto District School Board for the 2002–03 and 2003–04 school years.

== Personal life and education ==
Christie was born in Toronto, Ontario, the son of noted Macedonian-Canadian community activist, Alex Christie, and his wife Eleanor. He was educated at Wilfrid Laurier University and the University of Toronto, where he studied under Dr. Marshall McLuhan.

== Political career ==
=== Provincial politics ===
He worked as a ministerial assistant at the Ontario Secretariat for Social Development during the Bill Davis government. At the age of twenty-nine he ran for the Legislative Assembly of Ontario in the 1981 provincial election as a Progressive Conservative candidate in Beaches—Woodbine, and lost to New Democrat Marion Bryden by a very small margin of 324 votes. Christie campaigned unsuccessfully against Bryden again in the May 1985 election.

=== Toronto and Metro council ===
In November 1985, at age thirty-three, Christie was elected to the Toronto City Council as an Alderman for Ward 9 defeating the longtime NDP incumbent in a section of Toronto then known as The Beach. On his first day as a member of Council his colleagues elected him Chair of the City Services (Works) Committee and he was instrumental in the effort to close the Commissioners Street Incinerator. Christie also chaired the Neighbourhoods (Parks, Fire, Buildings) Committee. As chair of the Daycare Grants Committee, he was noted for his efforts resulting in better wages for early childhood educators. In 1987, Mr. Christie was selected as one of "Toronto's Top 25 Under 40" by the Globe and Mail.

In 1988, he was elected to the Metropolitan Toronto Council. Again, on his first day at Council he was elected to serve as Chair of the Metro Works Committee, and was a member of the Greater Toronto Area Solid Waste Interim Steering Committee. Christie helped manage the introduction of the blue box and subjected the Ashbridge's Bay Main Treatment Plant to a full environmental assessment. Christie was returned to the Metro Council without opposition in 1991 and handily re-elected in 1994, receiving more votes than any Metro candidate that year. From 1991, he served as a Toronto Transit Commissioner, becoming its chair in 1994. Christie opened the extension of the Spadina Subway to Downsview and led the TTC effort that resulted in the construction of the Sheppard Avenue subway line. He initiated the TTC Premium Express services through his efforts to create the first - the Beach Express in 1995. He served as a Board Member of Toronto East General Hospital, The Riverdale Hospital, O'Keefe/Hummingbird now the Sony Centre for the Performing Arts, the Toronto Zoo, the City of Toronto Non-Profit Housing Corporation (Cityhome), the Toronto District Heating Corporation (now Enwave) and a variety of community agencies.

Christie sought election to the newly amalgamated City of Toronto Council in November 1997, and was narrowly defeated by Tom Jakobek and Sandra Bussin in the two-member ward. The result was so close that CTV mistakenly declared Christie elected.

Paul Christie then became the chief executive of the Ontario Charity Gaming Operators' Association which achieved approvals for several small casinos. At Christie's suggestion the unpopular term 'video lottery terminal' was eliminated from the Ontario casino industry and thereafter replaced with 'slots'. Christie also operated an independent government relations consulting business.

In 2001–2002 Christie chaired the campaign of Ontario Labour Minister Chris Stockwell, who sought to be Leader of the Ontario Progressive Conservatives and Premier of Ontario.

=== TDSB supervisor ===
In August 2002, Christie was appointed by the government of Ontario of Ernie Eves to serve as supervisor of the Toronto District School Board, with sole authority for all financial and administrative functions of the Board. The school system is Canada's largest, with over 550 schools and 300,000 full- and part-time students. His appointment allowed Christie to supersede the authority of elected school trustees. Among the Trustees supervised were future Premier of Ontario Kathleen Wynne, future Ontario Cabinet Minister Donna Cansfield and future Toronto City Councillors Paula Fletcher and Shelley Carroll. The provincial government argued that Christie's appointment was necessary, as the TDSB had not submitted a budget to the Ontario Minister of Education as legally required. The politically deadlocked (11-11) TDSB claimed that they could not find the necessary operating expenses for the year, given provincial regulations which prohibited deficit spending. TDSB chair Donna Cansfield was perceived to be supportive of Christie's initiatives.

Christie balanced the TDSB's budget through a dramatic spending reduction of $90 million. Under his watch, the TDSB eliminated many secretarial positions, phased out school-community advisors and matrons, reduced the number of vice-principals, made cuts to outdoor education and adult education, and re-evaluated the position of social workers in the system. Using provincial funds he severed the employment of 700 people who had 'no position of record' with the Board. Christie's staff reports were not made public, and some critics argued that there were no adequate checks or balances on his authority. Christie argued that his reductions had no implications for classroom education.

His tenure as supervisor ended with the election of Dalton McGuinty's Liberal Party in the 2003 provincial election. The McGuinty government retained most of Christie's initiatives, including the staff reductions.

== Private life ==
Christie subsequently returned to his business, M.L. Christie Consulting Ltd., specializing in municipal and provincial government relations. He is registered with the City of Toronto Lobbyist Registry. Christie has represented many companies in the media and transportation sectors. He also served as a director of Grey Island Systems International Inc., (and its subsidiary, NextBus) a GPS services company (TSX V: GIS). Subsequent to the acquisition of Grey Island by Webtech Wireless Inc. (TSX: WEW), Christie joined the board of that company. In 2016, Mr. Christie was elected to the Board of Directors and Chairman of BeWhere Inc., (TSX Venture, BEW.V). Also in 2016, Christie became a member of the board of directors of the Toronto Foundation for Student Success and Canadian Macedonian Place.

Christie is married to Mary (Purves) Christie (Beach Citizen of the Year, 2009) and has two children, Molly and Cameron.

Preceded by Mike Colle	Chair of the Toronto Transit Commission; 1994-1998	Succeeded by Howard Moscoe
