= Toronto Municipal Licensing & Standards Division =

Municipal Licensing & Standards Division (MLS) is a municipal body in Toronto which grants licenses and permits for certain activities under the city's jurisdiction including by-law administration and enforcement services. Other areas under the MLS's purview including targeted strategies to address graffiti, noise, business inspections, parks regulations and animal services issues. Services also include business licensing and permitting, property standards, and animal care including control, shelter and adoption services. Toronto by-law 545 is what gives the MLS the power to license and inspect a variety of businesses in the city, in order to ensure public health, safety, consumer protection, and nuisance control.

In 2017, an audit report from the Auditor General of Toronto found that the division had issued or renewed 87,813 licenses, generated CAD$28.9 million in license and permit fees, and average 64 summons and 35 tickets per officer per year.

The Commission replaced the old Metro Toronto Licensing Commission and various other bodies of the former municipalities of Metro Toronto.

As of 2025 the executive director of the MLS is Carleton Grant.

== Criticisms ==
The MLS has been criticized for body-rub parlors and 'holistic centers' that are officially licensed by the MLS but often advertise erotic massages that violate city bylaws and are part of sex trafficking. In 2018, the Toronto Police created a working group in partnership with the MLS to identify long-term support and services for sex trafficking survivors and to develop prevention strategies.

The MLS is also in charge of regulating the use of fireworks in Toronto, where the sale and use of fireworks is only allowed without a permit on two civic holidays: Canada Day and Victoria Day. However a growing push from the various multicultural communities of Toronto has urged a change to the bylaws to allow fireworks at holidays such as Lunar New Year and Diwali. Other residents of Toronto have pushed for more stringent enforcement of illegal fireworks prior to Canada Day.

Due to fuel costs becoming prohibitive during surging inflation in 2022, the MLS proposed a temporary $1 surcharge on taxicab fares.
