= Reid Scott (politician) =

Canadian politician

- Official 1966 portrait

Member of Parliament for Danforth
- In office 1962–1968
- Preceded by: Robert Small
- Succeeded by: Riding abolished

Member of the Ontario Provincial Parliament for Beaches
- In office 1948–1951
- Preceded by: Thomas Alexander Murphy
- Succeeded by: William Henry Collings

Personal details
- Born: October 23, 1926 Toronto, Ontario
- Died: March 2, 2016 (aged 89) Ajax, Ontario
- Party: Liberal
- Other political affiliations: CCF (1948-1961); New Democratic (1961-2008)
- Profession: Lawyer, judge

Reid Scott (October 23, 1926 – March 2, 2016) was a lawyer and provincial judge in Canada, and a New Democratic Party Member of Parliament for the Danforth electoral district, in Toronto, from 1962 to 1968, leaving federal politics when his riding disappeared due to redistribution. He had previously served as the Co-operative Commonwealth Federation (CCF) Member of Provincial Parliament (MPP) for the Beaches constituency from 1948 to 1951. He returned to politics in 1969 as a Toronto city alderman.

Scott, a law student at the time, defeated 22-year incumbent Thomas Alexander Murphy when he was elected to the Ontario legislature as the MPP for Beaches in the 1948 provincial election. At age 21, he set the record for youngest MPP ever elected which remained unbroken until the election of 19 year old Sam Oosterhoff in a 2016 by-election.

Scott ran for federal office in the 1962 election and was elected as the NDP candidate for Danforth. While an MP, he played a role in the "Great Flag Debate". Serving on the all-party committee charged with recommending a new flag, Scott successfully lobbied Social Credit and Créditiste MPs to back the Maple Leaf flag as it did not have "symbols of the past". His efforts secured a majority on the committee in favour of what became the new flag of Canada. Reid was the last surviving member of the Parliamentary Committee that selected the design of the new flag. He did not stand in the 1968 Canadian federal election.

After leaving federal politics, Scott served as a Toronto City Councillor from 1969 to 1976. He led the effort in the 1969 Toronto municipal election to introduce party politics to the municipal level by leading a slate of 13 NDP candidates for the city council. In the early 1970s, as chair of the Metro Public Works Committee, he proposed turning part of Yonge Street into a pedestrian mall. The experiment was conducted for a week in 1971 attracting 50,000 people a day and then for longer periods during the summers of 1972 and 1973 but was ended due to mounting complaints by businesses about shoplifting and vagrancy. Scott stood for the position of Chairman of Metropolitan Toronto after Albert Campbell stepped down due to ill health. He came in second in the vote by Metropolitan Toronto Council, losing to Paul Godfrey on the second ballot, receiving 11 votes to Godfrey's 17 and third place candidate Ken Morrish's 3. Scott resigned from Toronto City Council on August 9, 1976, to accept an appointment as a provincial court judge.

At the age of 80, Scott announced plans to come out of political retirement to contest the riding of Ajax—Pickering for the Ontario NDP in the October 2007 provincial election. However, in the end, he did not run in the 2007 election. The NDP candidate for Ajax—Pickering ultimately finished third.

The next year, Scott announced that he was joining the Liberal Party of Canada because he admired Stéphane Dion as well as the Liberal leader's advocacy of a carbon tax. He died on March 2, 2016.
