= Woodbine (electoral district) =

Former provincial electoral district in Ontario, Canada

Ontario electoral district
- Woodbine, in relation to the other Toronto ridings, after the 1926 redistribution.

Defunct provincial electoral district
- Legislature: Legislative Assembly of Ontario
- District created: 1925
- District abolished: 1966
- First contested: 1926
- Last contested: 1967

Woodbine was a provincial electoral district in Ontario, Canada, that existed from 1926 to 1967. It covered a section of the eastern city of Toronto east of Jones Avenue and west of Woodbine Avenue. In 1966 there was a major redrawing of the riding boundaries in Toronto and the riding was split. The portion east of Greenwood Avenue was merged into the Beaches—Woodbine and the portion west went into the Riverdale riding.

== Boundaries ==
In 1926 the riding was carved out of the existing riding of Riverdale with the following boundaries. The southern boundary was Lake Ontario. Going north along the west side it formed a line following Knox Avenue all the way to Queen Street East. After short jog east it continued north along Greenwood Avenue until it reached the city limits at Milverton Blvd. The boundary went east following the city limit between Milverton Blvd. and Springdale Blvd. which was in East York. The boundary line turned south at Woodbine Avenue which was followed all the way back to the lake.

Prior to the 1934 election, the riding of Greenwood was dissolved and split between Woodbine to the east and Riverdale to the west. The new western boundary became Jones Avenue from Queen Street East to Danforth Avenue. North of Danforth Avenue the boundary continued along Dewhurst Blvd. and south of Queen Street East the boundary continued along Berkshire Avenue and south to the lake. The boundaries remained until the riding was dissolved prior to the 1967 election.

== Members of Provincial Parliament ==
Woodbine
Assembly	Years	Member	Party
Created from part of Riverdale
17th	1926–1929	George Sylvester Shields	Conservative
18th	1929–1934	George Sylvester Shields	Conservative
19th	1934–1937	Goldwin Corlett Elgie	Conservative
20th	1937–1943	Goldwin Corlett Elgie	Conservative
21st	1943–1945	Bert Leavens	Co-operative Commonwealth
22nd	1945–1948	Goldwin Corlett Elgie	Progressive Conservative
23rd	1948–1951	Bert Leavens	Co-operative Commonwealth
24th	1951–1955	Harold Fishleigh	Progressive Conservative
25th	1955–1959	Harold Fishleigh	Progressive Conservative
26th	1959–1963	Ken Bryden	New Democratic
27th	1963–1967	Ken Bryden	New Democratic
Sourced from the Ontario Legislative Assembly
Merged into the Beaches—Woodbine and Riverdale

== Election results ==
=== 1926 boundaries ===
1926 Ontario general election
Party	Candidate	Votes (Note: 64 out of 92 polls reporting.)	Vote %
Conservative	George Shields	8,860	78.6
Liberal	Florabel Dilworth	2,405	21.4
	Total	11,265	

1929 Ontario general election
Party	Candidate	Votes	Vote %
Conservative	George S. Shields	6,885	79.4
Liberal	J. A. Kinsella	1,783	20.6
	Total	8,668	

=== 1934 boundaries ===
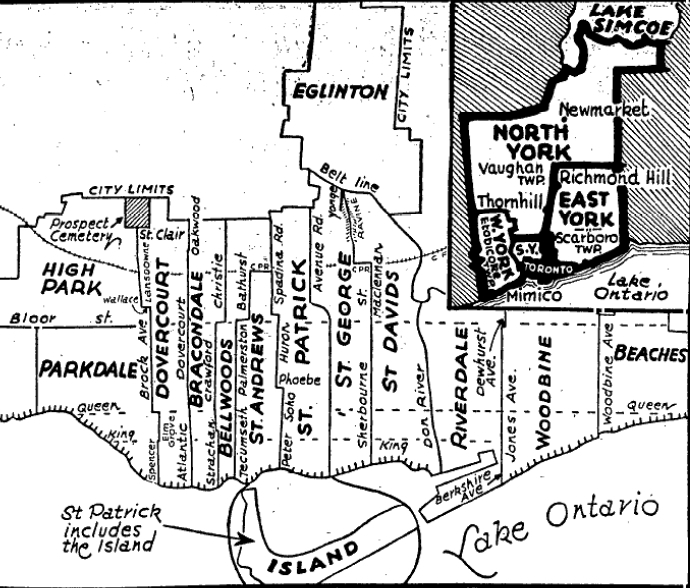
Toronto riding boundaries after 1934 redistribution

1934 Ontario general election
Party	Candidate	Votes	Vote %
Conservative	G.C. Elgie	9,334	41.8
Liberal	F.M. Walker	7,144	32.0
Co-operative Commonwealth	Fred C. Copp	5,666	25.4
Independent	W.E. Turley	205	0.9
	Total	22,349	

1937 Ontario general election
Party	Candidate	Votes	Vote %
Conservative	G.C. Elgie	9,756	43.7
Liberal	Fred Sturgeon	7,425	33.3
Co-operative Commonwealth	B.E. Leavens	5,152	23.1
	Total	22,333	

1943 Ontario general election
Party	Candidate	Votes	Vote %
Co-operative Commonwealth	Bert Leavens	8,848	47.9
Conservative	G.C. Elgie	7,232	39.2
Liberal	A. Roy Brown	2,385	12.9
	Total	18,465	

1945 Ontario general election
Party	Candidate	Votes	Vote %
Conservative	G.C. Elgie	12,083	43.8
Co-operative Commonwealth	Bert Leavens	9,821	35.6
Liberal	Perry Ryan	4,199	15.2
Independent	William MacPhee	938	3.4
Labor–Progressive	David Crichton	459	1.7
Socialist Labor	G.M. Thompson	69	0.3
	Total	27,569	

1948 Ontario general election
Party	Candidate	Votes	Vote %
Co-operative Commonwealth	Bert Leavens	12,986	47.4
Conservative	G.C. Elgie	10,694	39.0
Liberal	John Feeley	3,516	12.8
Socialist Labor	E. Cook	222	0.8
	Total	27,418	

1951 Ontario general election
Party	Candidate	Votes	Vote %
Conservative	Harold Fishleigh	10,480	44.0
Co-operative Commonwealth	Bert Leavens	9,347	39.2
Liberal	Gus Faux	4,013	16.8
	Total	23,480	

1955 Ontario general election
Party	Candidate	Votes	Vote %
Conservative	Harold Fishleigh	8,755	43.7
Co-operative Commonwealth	Ken Bryden	7,450	37.2
Liberal	Raymond Brawley	3,372	16.7
Labor–Progressive	James Davis	465	2.4
	Total	20,058	

1959 Ontario general election
Party	Candidate	Votes	Vote %
Co-operative Commonwealth	Ken Bryden	7,882	41.9
Conservative	Harold Fishleigh	7,616	40.5
Liberal	Donald Kennedy	3,330	17.7
	Total	18,829	

1963 Ontario general election
Party	Candidate	Votes	Vote %
Co-operative Commonwealth	Ken Bryden	9,020	45.9
Conservative	George Hogan	7,739	39.4
Liberal	John P. Hamilton	2,898	14.7
	Total	19,657	

== See also ==
- List of Ontario provincial electoral districts
- Canadian provincial electoral districts
