= Judy Sgro =

Canadian politician (born 1944)

The Honourable Judy Sgro PC MP
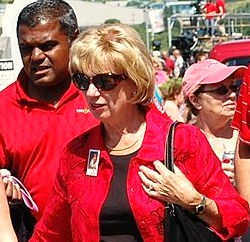

Member of Parliament for Humber River—Black Creek York West (1999–2015)
- Incumbent
- Assumed office November 15, 1999
- Preceded by: Sergio Marchi

Chair of the Standing Committee on International Trade
- Incumbent
- Assumed office January 29, 2020
- Preceded by: Mark Eyking

Chair of the Standing Committee on Transport, Infrastructure and Communities
- In office February 3, 2016 – September 11, 2019
- Preceded by: Vance Badawey

Minister of Citizenship and Immigration
- In office 12 December 2003 – 13 January 2005
- Prime Minister: Paul Martin
- Preceded by: Denis Coderre
- Succeeded by: Joe Volpe

Toronto City Councillor for North York Humber
- In office January 1, 1998 – November 14, 1999
- Preceded by: Ward Created
- Succeeded by: Paul Valenti
- Constituency: Ward 6

Metro Councillor for North York Humber
- In office December 1, 1994 – December 31, 1997
- Preceded by: Mario Gentile
- Succeeded by: City amalgamated

North York City Councillor
- In office 1987 – November 30, 1994
- Preceded by: Mario Gentile
- Succeeded by: Gina Severino
- Constituency: Ward 2

Personal details
- Born: December 16, 1944 (age 81) Moncton, New Brunswick, Canada
- Party: Liberal
- Spouse: Sam Sgro

Judith A. Sgro PC MP (born December 16, 1944) is a Canadian politician. A member of the Liberal Party of Canada, she currently represents the electoral district of Humber River—Black Creek in the House of Commons of Canada. Sgro currently serves as the chair of the Standing Committee on International Trade and as a chair on the Canadian House of Commons Liaison Committee since 2016.

== Politics ==
=== Councillor ===
Sgro was introduced to politics when she was elected to North York City Council in 1987. In 1994, she was acclaimed as a Metro councillor for North York. In 1998 she became a Toronto city councillor in the newly amalgamated city where she served a term as vice-chair of the Toronto Police Services Board.

=== Federal politics ===
==== Government (1999–2006) ====
In 1997, Sgro's first attempt at federal politics came up short when she tried to get elected in the riding of York South—Weston. She lost to John Nunziata, who was running as an independent, by 4,431 votes. In 1999 she won a by-election in York West to replace Sergio Marchi who had accepted an ambassadorial position to the World Trade Organization. She has since been re-elected by substantial pluralities.

In 2001, she was named chairperson of the prime minister's "Caucus Task Force on Urban Issues". In 2003, her group released an interim report recommending increased federal support to recognize their economic and social value. From December 12, 2003 to January 13, 2005, Sgro served as minister of Citizenship and Immigration in the government of Paul Martin.

==== Political favouritism issues ====
In November 2004, controversy began to surround Sgro as questions arose surrounding her activities during the June election earlier that year. Several members of her ministerial staff had filed expense claims to travel to and work in her riding throughout the campaign ending on election day. More serious claims were also raised when Opposition Conservative MPs claimed she had given a special immigration permit to a campaign supporter – specifically Alina Balaican, a Romanian who had initially been admitted to the country to work as a stripper. New Democratic Party MP Pat Martin also accused Sgro's aides of making threats to deny ministerial permits to his constituents if he criticized her on the stripper controversy. The press dubbed the issue Strippergate.

On January 14, 2005, Sgro resigned from cabinet after further allegations that she had offered to intervene in the immigration hearing of Harjit Singh, a Brampton pizzeria owner, in exchange for free pizza for her campaign staff. The following day, the Toronto Star revealed that Singh had previously committed credit card fraud.

On January 31, 2005, Sgro filed a lawsuit against Singh for $750,000 in damages. On May 10, 2005, the federal ethics commissioner Bernard Shapiro cleared Sgro of all wrongdoing from the "Strippergate" debacle when it was found that Sgro didn't know that two staffers had put her in a position of conflict of interest. The ethics commissioner also concluded that Sgro had never met the woman or even knew that she had volunteered on her re-election campaign. Shapiro said to Sgro, "It appears you acted appropriately." Also the same day, Singh retracted his allegations and apologized to Sgro. He said, "I now admit I did not have a meeting with Judy Sgro and at no time did she request any campaign assistance from me. Nor did she help me with my immigration problems."

Sgro was the first member of Cabinet to resign from Paul Martin's government. There was some speculation in the media that fellow minister Joe Volpe helped to engineer her resignation given that they had a cool relationship.

==== Expenses issue ====
In June 2010, it was revealed that Sgro had been claiming expenses for rent on an Ottawa luxury highrise condominium owned by her adult children, violating rules for such expenses set by the Board of Internal Economy of the House of Commons. Sgro had paid $138,000 to purchase the condo in 2001, and then transferred the title on the property to her children in 2006; she then paid her children $22,000 a year in rent to live in the apartment, violating rules forbidding MPs from claiming expenses on goods or services contracted from family members.

Asked about this controversy in 2013 by a reporter from Québecor Média, Sgro replied, "The issue was dealt with, an issue was pointed out... I immediately dealt with the issue and I would ask the prime minister and his folks to do the same thing. Thank you very much."

==== Opposition (2006–2015) ====
Sgro served as the opposition critic for Industry for the Liberals. On November 1, 2010, the Liberals released a white paper providing recommendations for retirement income security followed by a Pension Income Bill of Rights. The paper was created by a working group co-chaired by Sgro.

==== Government (2015–present) ====
Sgro currently serves as the chair of the Standing Committee on International Trade.

== Personal life ==
She and her husband Sam Sgro are the parents of three children. Her daughter, Deanna Sgro, was a candidate for the Ontario Liberal Party during the 2018 Ontario general election, as well as the 2018 Toronto municipal election for Humber River-Black Creek.

== Election results ==
2025 Canadian federal election: Humber River—Black Creek
Party	Candidate	Votes	%	±%	Expenditures
Liberal	Judy Sgro	21,357	55.6	–5.15	
Conservative	Bijay Paudel	13,745	35.8	+18.49	
New Democratic	Matias de Dovitiis	2,449	6.4	–10.02	
People's	Marek Jasinski	621	1.6	–2.31	
Communist	Jeanne McGuire	226	0.6	N/A	
Total valid votes/expense limit		38,398	98.7	+0.4	
Total rejected ballots		507	1.3	-0.4	
Turnout		38,905	56.1	+7.2	
Eligible voters		69,316			
Liberal hold		Swing		–11.82	
Source: Elections Canada

2021 Canadian federal election: Humber River—Black Creek
Party	Candidate	Votes	%	±%	Expenditures
Liberal	Judy Sgro	19,533	60.69	-0.40	$54,150.61
Conservative	Rinku Shah	5,599	17.40	+1.16	none listed
New Democratic	Matias De Dovitiis	5,279	16.40	-2.56	$36,826.81
People's	Raatib Anderson	1,258	3.91	+2.85	$6,216.88
Green	Unblind Tibbin	388	1.21	-0.91	$0.00
Marxist–Leninist	Christine Nugent	130	0.40	+0.17	$0.00
Total valid votes/expense limit		32,187	98.28	–	$104,982.06
Total rejected ballots		562	1.72	–	
Turnout		32,749	48.93	-7.92	
Eligible voters		66,934			
Liberal hold		Swing		-0.78	
Source: Elections Canada

2019 Canadian federal election: Humber River—Black Creek
Party	Candidate	Votes	%	±%	Expenditures
Liberal	Judy Sgro	23,187	61.1	-5.81	$93,410.00
New Democratic	Maria Augimeri	7,198	19.0	+8.06	$18,120.64
Conservative	Iftikhar Choudry	6,164	16.3	-3.96	$3,300.00
Green	Mike Schmitz	804	2.1	+0.47	none listed
People's	Ania Krosinska	402	1.1	–	none listed
United	Stenneth Smith	114	0.3	-	$0.00
Marxist–Leninist	Christine Nugent	89	0.2	-0.36	$0.00
Total valid votes/expense limit		37,958	100.0		
Total rejected ballots		503			
Turnout		38,461	56.8		
Eligible voters		67,656			
Liberal hold		Swing		-6.94	
Source: Elections Canada

2015 Canadian federal election: Humber River—Black Creek
Party	Candidate	Votes	%	±%	Expenditures
Liberal	Judy Sgro	23,995	66.9	+19.9	–
Conservative	Kerry Vandenberg	7,228	20.2	-1.9	–
New Democratic	Darnel Harris	3,851	10.7	-17.1	–
Green	Keith Jarrett	584	1.6	0	–
Marxist–Leninist	Christine Nugent	201	0.6	–	–
Total valid votes/Expense limit		35,859	100.0		$195,631.84
Total rejected ballots		333	–	–	
Turnout		36,192	–	–	
Eligible voters		60,994			
Source: Elections Canada
Liberal hold		Swing		+18.5	

2011 Canadian federal election: York West
Party	Candidate	Votes	%	±%	Expenditures
Liberal	Judy Sgro	13,030	47.0	-12.4	
New Democratic	Giulio Manfrini	7,721	27.8	+9.1	
Conservative	Audrey Walters	6,122	22.1	+5.4	
Green	Unblind Tibben	450	1.6	-3.6	
Christian Heritage	George Okoth Otura	231	0.8	–	
Canadian Action	Arthur Smitherman	170	0.6	–	
Total valid votes/expense limit		27,724	100.0		
Total rejected ballots		267	1.0	+0.2	
Turnout		27,991	48.2	-0.1	
Eligible voters		57,287	–	–	

2008 Canadian federal election: York West
Party	Candidate	Votes	%	±%	Expenditures
Liberal	Judy Sgro	16,997	59.4	-4.4	$35,514
New Democratic	Giulio Manfrini	5,363	18.7	+4.6	$12,354
Conservative	Kevin Nguyen	4,773	16.7	-1.9	$12,960
Green	Nick Capra	1,488	5.2	+2.2	$1,557
Total valid votes/expense limit		28,621	100.0	$77,457	
Total rejected ballots		219	0.8		
Turnout		28,840	48.3		

2006 Canadian federal election: York West
Party	Candidate	Votes	%	Expenditures
Liberal	Judy Sgro	21,418	63.78	$48,741.93
Conservative	Parm Gill	6,244	18.59	$71,005.65
New Democratic	Sandra Romano Anthony	4,724	14.07	$8,845.73
Green	Nick Capra	1,002	2.98	$1,692.18
Independent	Axcel Cocon	192	0.57	$1,801.61
Total valid votes		33,580	100.00	
Total rejected ballots		261		
Turnout		33,841	57.90	
Electors on the lists		58,450		

2004 Canadian federal election: York West
Party	Candidate	Votes	%	±%
Liberal	Judy Sgro	17,903	64.7	-12.6
New Democratic	Sandra Romano Anthony	4,228	15.2	+6.0
Conservative	Leslie Soobrian	3,120	11.2	+0.5
Christian Heritage	Joseph Grubb	1,580	5.7	
Green	Tim McKellar	824	3.0	
Total valid votes		27,655	100.0	

Note: Conservative vote is compared to the total of the Canadian Alliance vote and Progressive Conservative vote in 2000 election.

2000 Canadian federal election: York West
Party	Candidate	Votes	%	±%
Liberal	Judy Sgro	19,737	77.3	+3.1
Alliance	Munish Chandra	2,724	10.7	+7.9
New Democratic	Julia McCrea	2,361	9.2	+1.5
Marijuana	G. Marcello Marchetti	537	2.1	
Marxist–Leninist	Amarjit Dhillon	175	0.7	
Total valid votes		25,534	100.0	

Note: Canadian Alliance vote is compared to the Reform vote in 1997 election.

Canadian federal by-election, November 15, 1999: York West
Party	Candidate	Votes	%	±%
Liberal	Judy Sgro	10,034	74.2	+0.5
Progressive Conservative	Elio Di Iorio	1,721	12.7	+5.2
New Democratic	Julia McCrea	1,054	7.8	-2.1
Reform	Enzo Granzotto	377	2.8	-6.2
Canadian Action	Stephen Burega	242	1.8	
Green	Henry Zeifman	101	0.7	
Total valid votes		13,529	100.0	
Liberal hold		Swing		+1.3
By-election due to the appointment of Sergio Marchi as Canadian Ambassador to the World Trade Organization

1997 Toronto City Council Election: North York Humber
Council Candidate 2 to be elected	Vote	%
Judy Sgro	14,334	33.83
George Mammoliti	10,226	24.13
Gina Serverino	6,875	16.22
Tony Marzilli	5,205	12.28
Bob Churchhill	5,012	11.83
Michael Marson	722	1.70

1997 Canadian federal election: York South-Weston
Party	Candidate	Votes	%	±%
Independent	John Nunziata	17,163	45.0	
Liberal	Judy Sgro	12,732	33.4	-36.7
New Democratic	Odoardo Di Santo	3,552	9.3	+3.9
Reform	Kathleen Crone	2,363	6.2	-8.6
Progressive Conservative	Jan Harnett	1,925	5.1	-1.8
Green	Shelley Lipsey	171	0.4	
Marxist–Leninist	Ginette Boutet	112	0.3	+0.1
Independent	Hassan Husseini	98	0.3	
Independent gain from Liberal		Swing		–
Total valid votes		38,116	100.0	

1994 Metro Toronto Council Election: North York Humber
Council Candidate	Vote	%
Judy Sgro	Acclaimed	

1991 North York City Council Election: Ward 2
Council Candidate	Vote	%
Judy Sgro	Acclaimed	

1988 North York City Council Election: Ward 2
Council Candidate	Vote	%
Judy Sgro	6,882	67.43
Gerry Iuliano	2,398	23.50
Luigi Cavaleri	926	9.07
