= Progressive Conservative Party of Ontario candidates in the 1981 Ontario provincial election =

The Progressive Conservative Party of Ontario ran a full slate of candidates in the 1981 provincial election, and won a majority government with 70 out of 125 seats. Many of the party's candidates have their own biography pages; information about others may be found here.

== H. Ross Charles (Downsview) ==
Charles was a veteran activist for the Progressive Conservative Party of Canada, and a supporter of John Diefenbaker during the party's internal feuds of the 1960s. Born at Rama First Nation he lived in various communities in southern Ontario, including Tottenham, where he published three weekly newspapers in the community. Aanishinaabe / Ojibway, he was described in one Toronto newspaper as the only First Nations candidate in the 1981 election. During the campaign, he argued that Canada's Aboriginal people needed to get out from under the Indian Act and should leave the reservation system. He received 5,475 votes (24.76%), finishing third against New Democratic Party candidate Odoardo Di Santo. After the 1981 election, he was appointed as the first co-ordinator of multicultural programs at the Canadian National Exhibition. The following year, he was appointed as vice-president of Native Programming and Corporate Public Relations at Canadian Satellite Communications Inc. (Cancom).

Charles died in October 1987. That same year, Cancom established a Ross Charles award to recognize the achievements of Aboriginal people in the field of broadcasting. In 1995, the award was adjusted to offer young Indigenous people training in broadcasting and telecommunications.

== John Larocque (St. Catharines) ==
Larocque was a longtime radio personality with 1220 CHSC-AM in St. Catharines. He is known as "The Mayor of the Morning".

He received 10,273 votes (32.36%), finishing second against Liberal incumbent Jim Bradley. Larocque acknowledged during the campaign that Bradley had "done a good job for the riding", but argued that he was limited by being on the opposition benches.

== Barbara Jafelice (York South) ==
Jafelice was a graphic designer, and was an executive on the Weston Ratepayers Association during the 1970s. She campaigned for the Progressive Conservatives in the 1981 provincial election, and again in a by-election held on 4 November 1982. Jalefice was thirty-six years old during the by-election campaign, and was Chairman of the Borough of York Planning Board. Provincial cabinet minister Bette Stephenson spoke at her nomination meeting, and described her as a "scrappy, feisty fighter".

Jafelice was the campaign manager for York Centre Progressive Conservative candidate Michael Cohen in the 1984 Canadian federal election. She later organized a "Tory Gala" event in Woodbridge prior to the 1988 federal election. By 1991, she was a spokeswomen for the United States of America's consulate in Toronto.

Electoral record
Election	Division	Party	Votes	%	Place	Winner
1981 provincial	York South	Progressive Conservative	7,628		3/4	Donald C. MacDonald, New Democratic Party
provincial by-election, 4 November 1982	York South	Progressive Conservative	4,376	17.87	3/5	Bob Rae, New Democratic Party
