= Maria Augimeri =

Canadian politician

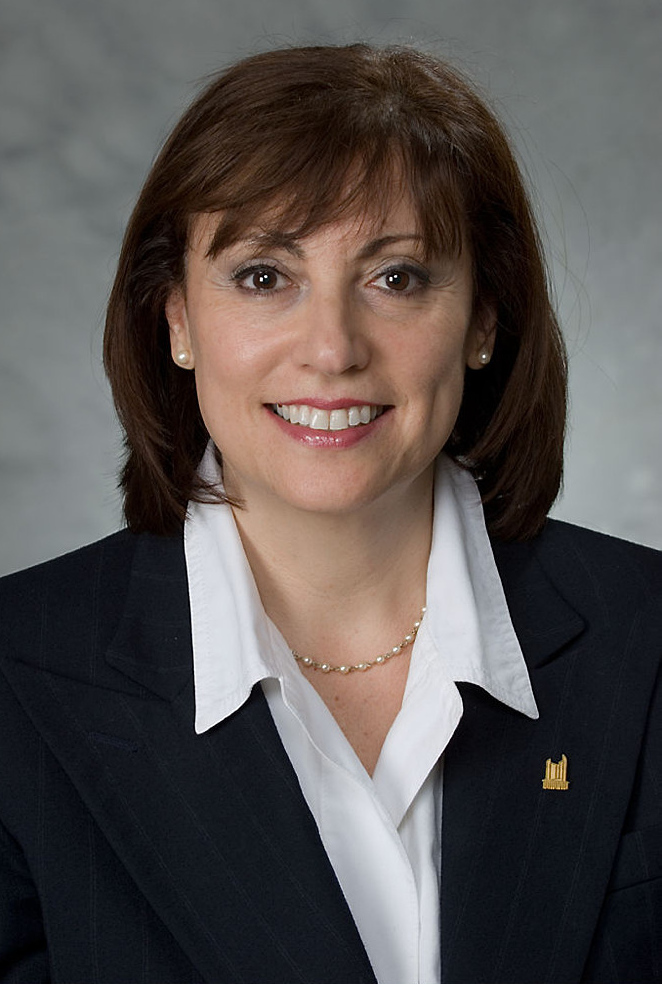
- Augimeri in 2008

Toronto City Councillor for (Ward 9) York Centre
- In office December 1, 2000 – December 1, 2018
- Preceded by: Ward Created
- Succeeded by: James Pasternak

Chair of the Toronto Transit Commission
- In office February 19, 2014 – November 30, 2014
- Preceded by: Karen Stintz
- Succeeded by: Josh Colle

Toronto City Councillor for (Ward 7) Black Creek
- In office January 1, 1998 – December 1, 2000
- Preceded by: Ward Created
- Succeeded by: Ward Abolished

Metro Toronto City Councillor for Black Creek
- In office December 1, 1988 – January 1, 1998
- Preceded by: Ward Created
- Succeeded by: City Amalgamated

North York City Councillor for Ward 5
- In office December 1, 1985 – December 1, 1988
- Succeeded by: Anthony Perruzza

Personal details
- Born: 1954 (age 71–72) Italy
- Party: New Democratic Party
- Spouse: Odoardo Di Santo
- Occupation: Social Anthropologist
- Website: mariaaugimeri.com

Maria Augimeri (/ˌɔːdʒɪˈmɛəri/ AW-jim-AIR-ee, Italian: [maˈriːa audʒiˈmɛːri]; born c. 1954) is a Canadian politician. From 1985 to 2018, she served as a local politician in Toronto, holding office as a school board trustee, and as a council member in North York, Metropolitan Toronto, and on Toronto City Council. In 2019, Augimeri stood as the New Democratic candidate for the riding of Humber River-Black Creek.

== Background ==
Born in Italy, Augimeri moved to Canada with her family at the age of 2. Before entering politics, she was a Social Anthropologist at York University. She has written three books on the Italian-Canadian community and is also a published poet.

== Politics ==
She first entered politics as a school trustee, and was elected to the city council of North York in 1985. She ran for the Ontario New Democratic Party in the 1987 provincial election in the riding of Downsview which her husband, Odoardo Di Santo, held for ten years before losing in the 1985 election. She lost to Liberal Laureano Leone by 174 votes.

Augimeri was elected to the Metro Toronto council in 1988, and remained on that council until the creation of the new city of Toronto in 1997. She was elected councillor to the new city council three times. She was known for promoting environmental awareness and cultural issues.

She was endorsed for re-election by the Toronto Star newspaper in 2003.

The local weekly newspaper Now Magazine also gave her an endorsement in 2000.

On August 10, 2008, a massive propane explosion in Augimeri's ward destroyed a propane distribution facility which caused the evacuation of thousands of residents. Augimeri cut short a summer vacation in Italy and returned to Toronto to assist with the situation. During a press conference, she became involved in a heated discussion with Tony Di Santo, head of the local ratepayer's group. She said, "If people have problems of a partisan nature they should not be using the death of a firefighter... So shut up!" Later she apologized for losing her temper.

=== 2010 municipal election ===
The 2010 Toronto municipal election was held on October 25. Augimeri won by an 89-vote margin (0.7%) over local businessman Gus Cusimano. Augimeri thanked her supporters the following day on October 26, 2010, when she said, "I know a lot of the community voted for me because they know I'm the one to protect community interests."

Cusimano later announced that he would challenge the results. The matter was heard in court on March 29, 2011. The judge ruled that there were enough irregularities in the 2010 voting that the election should be held again. Initially the city's legal staff said they would be appealing the decision but on May 13 it was announced that the city would not launch an appeal. City Clerk Uli Watkiss said in a statement, "The decision to proceed with a by-election and resolve this matter as quickly as possible is in the best interest of the public, the individuals directly affected, and the workings of Council." The mayor's office supported the decision. Rob Ford's press secretary Adrienne Batra said, "Obviously the mayor supported (Cusimano) during the general election and once the byelection gets under way he will be fully supporting him again."

On May 16, Augimeri announced that she would be appealing the decision herself. Augimeri told media, "The clerk’s advice not to appeal does harm to taxpayers as well as to the integrity of our electoral system." On August 4, the city reversed its decision and decided to join the appeal which was held in September 2011. On December 19, the court ruled in Augimeri's favour. A three judge panel ruled that although 300 ballots were unsigned by electoral officers the people voting were very likely eligible to vote and that this would have no effect on the election. In a related judgement, they also ruled that Cusimano incorrectly voted in the Ward 9 election because he lived in another riding. They decided that no further action was necessary.

Augimeri was appointed Chair of the Toronto Transit Commission in February 2014 upon the resignation of Karen Stintz to run for Mayor of Toronto in the 2014 Toronto election winning appointment over Josh Colle, Stintz's preferred successor.

=== 2014 municipal election ===
In the 2014 election, Augimeri again faced Cusimano, though defeated him by a larger margin (42.74% to 28.37%).

=== 2018 Municipal Election ===
Following the election of Augimeri's former council colleague Doug Ford as Premier of Ontario, Ford's Progressive Conservative government passed legislation that reduced the number of seats on Toronto City Council from 47 to 25 immediately before the city's scheduled election. The legislation, referred to as the Better Local Government Act, merged wards being contested by Augimeri and another council colleague, James Pasternak. Augimeri lost to Pasternak by over 2000 votes, blaming the reduction in council seats for her loss and noting that she would have won in her old ward.

Augimeri served as the chairperson of the Toronto and Region Conservation Authority (TRCA) Board of Directors until February 2019. In July 2019, Augimeri was replaced on the TRCA by a citizen appointee.

=== 2019 Federal Election ===
In the October 21, 2019 Federal Election, Maria Augimeri was unable to unseat the long time Liberal incumbent in the Humber River-Black Creek riding, Judy Sgro. Ms. Sgro won with 22,983 votes, Ms. Augimeri with the NDP was a distant second at 7,126.

== Election results ==
=== Federal ===
2019 Canadian federal election: Humber River—Black Creek
Party	Candidate	Votes	%	±%	Expenditures
Liberal	Judy Sgro	23,187	61.1	-5.81	$93,410.00
New Democratic	Maria Augimeri	7,198	19.0	+8.06	$18,120.64
Conservative	Iftikhar Choudry	6,164	16.3	-3.96	$3,300.00
Green	Mike Schmitz	804	2.1	+0.47	none listed
People's	Ania Krosinska	402	1.1	–	none listed
United	Stenneth Smith	114	0.3	-	$0.00
Marxist–Leninist	Christine Nugent	89	0.2	-0.36	$0.00
Total valid votes/expense limit		37,958	100.0		
Total rejected ballots		503			
Turnout		38,461	56.8		
Eligible voters		67,656			
Liberal hold		Swing		-6.94	
Source: Elections Canada

=== Provincial ===
1987 Ontario general election: Downsview
Party	Candidate	Votes	%	±%
Liberal	Laureano Leone	11,832	46.80	+2.88
New Democratic	Maria Augimeri	11,658	46.11	+3.06
Progressive Conservative	Drew McCreadie	1,788	7.07	−5.94
Total valid votes		25278	100.00	

=== Municipal ===
Results of the October 22, 2018 Toronto - Ward 6 - York Centre Councillor Election
Candidate	Popular vote			Expenditures
Candidate	Votes	%	±%	Expenditures
James Pasternak (Incumbent)	11,559	47.61%	-57.78%	$67,212.21
Maria Augimeri (Incumbent)	9,223	37.99%	-4.75%	$66,209.39
Louise Russo	2,726	11.23%	-	$23,323.98
Edward Zaretsky	771	3.17	-	-^{1}
Total votes	24,279			
Registered voters				
^{1} These candidates did not submit official Financial Statements and are, therefore, ineligible to run in the 2022 Municipal election Note: All Toronto Municipal Elections are officially non-partisan. Note: Candidate campaign colours are based on the prominent colour used in campaign items (signs, literature, etc.) and are used as a visual differentiation between candidates.
Sources: City of Toronto, "Election Results"

2014 Toronto election, Ward 9
Candidate	Votes	%
Maria Augimeri	6,373	42.74%
Gus Cusimano	4,230	28.37%
Anthony Fernando	3,367	22.58%
Danny Quattrociocchi	562	3.77%
Ances Hercules	248	1.66%
Wilson Basantes	130	0.87%
Total	14,910	100%

2010 Toronto election, Ward 9
Candidate	Votes	%
Maria Augimeri	5,452	44.3
Gus Cusimano	5,363	43.6
Gianfranco Amendola	1,082	8.8
Wilson Basantes	259	2.1
Stefano Picone	142	1.2
Total	12,298	100

2006 Toronto election, Ward 9
Candidate	Votes	%
Maria Augimeri	7,256	77.6
Vlad Protsenko	2,100	22.4
Total	9,356	100

2003 Toronto election, Ward 9
Candidate	Votes	%
Maria Augimeri	7,898	74.1
Anna Oppedisano	1,061	9.9
Richard Baldachino	779	7.3
Annmarie Robb	487	4.5
Domenic D'Abruzzo	422	4.2
Total	10,647	100

2000 Toronto election, Ward 9
Candidate	Votes	%
Maria Augimeri	8,698	72.3
Anna Oppedisano	2,816	23.4
Richard Baldachino	504	4.3
Total	12,018	100

1997 Toronto municipal election: Councillor, Ward Seven (two members elected)
Candidate	Votes	%
Maria Augimeri	11,243	28.01
Peter Li Preti	9,747	24.28
Maria Rizzo	8,850	22.05
Anthony Perruzza	6,347	15.81
Anna Stella	2,961	7.38
Jeanelle Julien	523	1.30
Abdulhaq Omar	467	1.16
Total valid votes	40,138	100.00

== Works ==
- Italian-Canadians, a cross section. 1978. National Congress of Italian-Canadians. Ottawa.
- Calabrese folklore. 1985. National Museums of Canada. Ottawa.
