= Humber River—Black Creek =

Humber River—Black Creek may refer to:

- Humber River—Black Creek (federal electoral district), federal riding in Toronto, Ontario, Canada
- Humber River—Black Creek (provincial electoral district), provincial riding in Toronto, Ontario, Canada
- Ward 7 Humber River—Black Creek, municipal ward in Toronto, Ontario, Canada
