= Perruzza =

Perruzza is an Italian surname. Notable people with the surname include:

- Anthony Perruzza (born 1959/60), Canadian politician
- Jordan Perruzza (born 2001), Canadian soccer player
