= Canadian House of Commons Standing Committee on International Trade =

Parliamentary committees on International Trade

The Standing Committee on International Trade (CIIT) is a committee in the House of Commons of Canada. It focuses on international trade. The committee was established in the 39th Parliament, having split off from the Standing Committee on Foreign Affairs and International Trade.

== Studies ==
- Canada-Central America Four Free Trade Agreement Negotiations
- Canada's Trade Policy
- Canada-U.S. Trade and Investment Issues and the Security and Prosperity Partnership of North America (SPP)
- Canadian International Trade Tribunal: Dumped and subsidized import and domestic producers
- softwood lumber
- Trade Agreement between Canada and South Korea
- WTO

== Membership ==
As of the 45th Canadian Parliament:

Party	Member	District
Liberal	Judy Sgro, chair	Humber River—Black Creek, ON
Bloc Quebecois	Simon-Pierre Savard-Tremblay, vice chair	Saint-Hyacinthe—Bagot—Acton, QC
Conservative	Adam Chambers, vice chair	Simcoe North, ON
Liberal	Peter Fonseca	Mississauga East—Cooksville, ON
Conservative	Jason Groleau	Beauce, QC
Liberal	Matt Jeneroux	Edmonton Riverbend, AB
Liberal	Linda Lapointe	Rivière-des-Mille-Îles, QC
Liberal	Steeve Lavoie	Beauport—Limoilou, QC
Conservative	Jacob Mantle	York—Durham, ON
Liberal	Yasir Naqvi	Ottawa Centre, ON

== Subcommittees ==
- Subcommittee on Agenda and Procedure (SCII)
