= Laureano Leone =

Canadian politician (1928–2026)

Ontario MPP
- In office 1987–1990
- Preceded by: Joseph Cordiano
- Succeeded by: Anthony Perruzza
- Constituency: Downsview

Personal details
- Born: September 11, 1928 Rocca Pia, L'Aquila, Italy
- Died: September 15, 2026 (aged 98)
- Party: Liberal

Laureano Leone (September 11, 1928 – September 15, 2026) was a Canadian politician. He was a Liberal member of the Legislative Assembly of Ontario from 1987 to 1990.

== Background ==
Leone was educated at Liceo Classico "Ovidio" of Sulmona in Abruzzo, and at the Detroit Institute of Technology. He also served as vice-chair of the Ontario Place Corporation, and as president of the National Congress of Italian Canadians and the Canadian Ethnocultural Council. He has received a Gold Medal (Award of Merit) from the city of Toronto for "community involvement", and was appointed an Officer of the Order of Canada on April 22, 1982.

Leone died on September 15, 2026, at the age of 98.

== Career ==
Leone ran for the Ontario legislature in the 1981 provincial election, but finished third against New Democrat Ed Philip in the riding of Etobicoke. He ran a second time in the riding of Downsview in the 1987 provincial election and defeated NDP candidate Maria Augimeri by 174 votes. He served as a backbench supporter of David Peterson's government for the next three years.

The Liberals were defeated by the NDP in the 1990 provincial election. Leone's seat was a top NDP target, and he lost to NDP candidate Anthony Perruzza by over 5,000 votes.

He was later named an honorary consul of Canada in Sulmona, Italy.
