= Annamarie Castrilli =

Canadian politician

Ontario MPP
- In office 1995–1999
- Preceded by: Anthony Perruzza
- Succeeded by: Riding abolished
- Constituency: Downsview

Chair of the University of Toronto Governing Council
- In office 1993–1995
- Preceded by: Robert James McGavin
- Succeeded by: F. Anthony Comper

Vice-Chair of the University of Toronto Governing Council
- In office 1989–1993
- Preceded by: John R. Gardner
- Succeeded by: F. Anthony Comper

Personal details
- Born: Naples, Italy
- Party: Liberal, 1995-1999; Conservative, 1999
- Education: University of Toronto (BA, MA, PhD)
- Occupation: Lawyer

Annamarie Castrilli is a former politician, lawyer, educator and rights advocate in Ontario, Canada.

== Background ==
Castrilli was educated at the University of Toronto, receiving a Bachelor of Arts degree from St. Michael's College in 1969, a Master of Arts degree in 1970, and a Ph.D. in 1977. She subsequently attended Osgoode Hall Law School, receiving an LL.B. in 1984. She began her law career with the firm of Harries, Hauser, Loudon & Syron from 1985 to 1989 and was a Tax Partner with Bratty and Partners in 1990. From 1991 to 1995, she ran a private practice as a corporate lawyer.

Castrilli also served on the Governing Council of the University of Toronto from 1989 to 1995 (including two years as its chair), was a trustee with the Sunnybrook Hospital from 1993 to 1995, and was a director of the Royal Ontario Museum, also from 1993 to 1995. She was a founding member of the Italian Canadian Women's Alliance in 1976, and of the Women's Intercultural Council in 1988.

Her other achievements include serving as National President of the National Congress of Italian Canadians; President of the Universal Youth Foundation; Member of the Canada 21 Council; Member of the Ontario Lieutenant Governor's Board of Review; a Director of the Legal Education Action Fund Foundation; member of Canadian Friends of Hebrew University; a Director of North York Branson Hospital; a Director of The John Cabot (1997) 500th Anniversary Corporation; a Director of the Integrated Growth Fund; Chair of the Canadian Centre for Italian Culture and Education; a Director and then Chair of the Association of Chairs of Colleges and Universities; Member of the Board of Presidents, Canadian Ethnocultural Council; founding member and then President of the Women's Intercultural Network; Vice-Magister, Phi Delta Phi, Osgoode Inn; a Director of The Canadian Stage Company; Governor of the YMCA; founder and member of the Advisory Board of Amani Canada, an organization dedicated to supporting the work of Amani, which runs homes and schools for street children in Tanzania, Africa.

During her mandate as President of the National Congress of Italian Canadians she led the fight to have the Government of Canada acknowledge the injustice done to Italian Canadians during World War II. In 1990 at an evening organized by the National Congress of Italian Canadians, Prime Minister Brian Mulroney apologized for the internment of Italian Canadians during World War II and other acts of injustice directed at them.

Before entering politics, she had written a great deal on multiculturalism, women's issues, constitutional, civil and human rights. She had also been involved in the constitutional debate in Canada. She was a member of the National Coalition on the Constitution; Member of the Council for Canadian Unity; a member of the Federal Task Force on Multiculturalism; a member of the Premier of Ontario's Advisory Group on the Constitution (Charlottetown Accord) and Vice-Chair of the Ontario Canada Committee (the “Yes Committee”) in the Charlottetown Referendum.

== Politics ==
In the provincial election of 1995, Castrilli was elected as a Liberal in the northwest Toronto riding of Downsview, defeating incumbent New Democrat Anthony Perruzza. The general election was won by the Progressive Conservatives, and Castrilli became the Opposition Critic for Colleges and Universities, also serving as Opposition Critic for Women's Issues Critic to the Attorney-General. She was subsequently appointed Chair of the Standing Committee on Social Development and a member of the Tripartite Legislative Committee of the Ontario Government on the Calgary Constitutional Accord, overseeing the Calgary Accord constitutional referendum in Ontario.

When Lyn McLeod resigned as Liberal leader in 1996, Castrilli initially entered the race to succeed her, ultimately giving her support to eventual winner Dalton McGuinty. (See Ontario Liberal Leadership Conventions.)

Castrilli initially planned to run as a Liberal in the 1999 provincial election, but was defeated for the party's nomination in York Centre by fellow caucus member Monte Kwinter. The Progressive Conservative government had previously reduced the number of constituencies from 130 to 103, forcing several incumbent Members of Provincial Parliament (MPPs) to compete against one another for renomination.

On the last sitting day of the legislature, Castrilli crossed the floor to sit as a Progressive Conservative. She won the PC nomination in the Parkdale—High Park constituency, and lost to Liberal MPP Gerard Kennedy in the general election. Kennedy and Castrilli had both been candidates for the Liberal party leadership in 1996.

== Later life ==
She was appointed by Premier Mike Harris as the director of "Partnership with Ontarians", an office created to promote the province for international business.

In the federal election of 2004, Castrilli supported Conservative Party candidate Michael Mostyn. Later in the year, she was co-chair of Jim Flaherty's unsuccessful bid to lead the provincial Tories.

She is also the founding partner of Castrilli Law, a director of SEADAC Strategic Consultants Inc., a director of the Ontario Association of Former Parliamentarians and the Chair of the Educational Foundation of the Ontario Association of Former Parliamentarians.
