= Sergio Marchi (politician) =

Canadian politician

The Honourable Sergio Marchi PC

Member of Parliament for York West
- In office 1984–1999
- Preceded by: James Fleming
- Succeeded by: Judy Sgro

Personal details
- Born: May 12, 1956 (age 70) Buenos Aires, Argentina
- Party: Liberal
- Profession: Urban planner

Sergio Marchi, PC (born May 12, 1956), is a Canadian politician and former diplomat, who served as a federal Liberal Member of Parliament and cabinet minister and, later, as an ambassador.

== Biography ==
Marchi was born in Argentina to an Italian family who subsequently emigrated to Canada.

He first entered politics at the municipal level, where he was elected Alderman for Ward 1 in North York (now part of Toronto) in 1982. He was subsequently elected to the House of Commons of Canada in the 1984 election as the Liberal Member of Parliament (MP) for the Toronto-area riding of York West.

When the Liberals came to power in the 1993 election, Prime Minister Jean Chrétien brought Marchi into the Canadian Cabinet as Minister of Citizenship and Immigration. He also served as Minister of the Environment and Minister of International Trade in 1997.

Marchi left politics in 1999 and was appointed as Canadian ambassador to the World Trade Organization, and the UN Agencies, in Geneva. He served one term as Chairman of the WTO's ruling council.

In 2005, it was reported in the media that Marchi might challenge incumbent David Miller for the Toronto mayoralty in the municipal election in 2006. Marchi said only that he was talking with people.

After leaving the diplomatic world, in February 2006, Marchi joined the Toronto law firm of Lang Michener LLP as a senior advisor, and also became President of the Canada China Business Council, and Chairman of the Canadian Services Coalition.

Marchi then took up a second tour in Geneva, to pursue a private sector opportunity, and established his own consultancy, the Marchi Group.

In February 2015, Marchi returned to Canada, where he was appointed President and CEO of the Canadian Electricity Association, headquartered in Ottawa.

In 2025, Marchi released his memoir, Pursuing a Public Life: How to Succeed in the Political Arena.

== Electoral record ==
1997 Canadian federal election: York West
Party	Candidate	Votes	%	±%
Liberal	Sergio Marchi	21,254	73.6	-6.2
New Democratic	Lombe Chinkangala	2,853	9.9	+6.5
Reform	Ken Freeman	2,598	9.0	-1.7
Progressive Conservative	Richard Donovan	2,165	7.5	+2.8
Total valid votes		28,870	100.0	

1993 Canadian federal election: York West
Party	Candidate	Votes	%	±%
Liberal	Sergio Marchi	25,356	79.8	+20.2
Reform	Bruce A. Castleman	3,385	10.7	-8.4
Progressive Conservative	Marguerite Bebluk	1,506	4.7	-14.3
New Democratic	Rosanne Giulietti	1,074	3.4	-14.8
Natural Law	Claudio Paolini	209	0.7	
Marxist–Leninist	Jean-Paul Bédard	164	0.5	
Abolitionist	Ljiljana Medjedovic	82	0.3	
Total valid votes		31,776	100.0	

1988 Canadian federal election: York West
Party	Candidate	Votes	%	±%
Liberal	Sergio Marchi	19,936	59.6	+15.0
Progressive Conservative	Elizabeth Smith	6,368	19.1	-11.8
New Democratic	Alice Lambrinos	6,088	18.2	-3.8
Libertarian	Roma Kelembet	498	1.5	+0.7
Independent	Sherland R. Chhangur	270	0.8	
Independent	Gary Robert Walsh	145	0.4	
Communist	Jack C. Sweet	119	0.4	0.0
Total valid votes		33,424	100.0	

1984 Canadian federal election: York West
Party	Candidate	Votes	%	±%
Liberal	Sergio Marchi	17,629	44.6	-12.2
Progressive Conservative	Frank Di Giorgio	12,218	30.9	+12.0
New Democratic	Bruno Pasquantonio	8,718	22.0	-1.5
Libertarian	Dusan Kubias	335	0.8	+0.3
Independent	Anna Esposito	279	0.7	
Green	Jutta I. Keylwerth	238	0.6	
Communist	Jack C. Sweet	147	0.4	+0.3
Total valid votes		39,564	100.0	
