= James Fleming (York West MP) =

Canadian politician (1939–2023)

The Honourable James Sydney Clark Fleming PC

Member of Parliament for York West
- In office 1972–1984
- Preceded by: Philip Givens
- Succeeded by: Sergio Marchi

Personal details
- Born: October 30, 1939 Kitchener, Ontario, Canada
- Died: February 15, 2023 (aged 83)
- Party: Liberal
- Profession: Journalist

James Sydney Clark Fleming PC (October 30, 1939 – February 15, 2023) was a Canadian broadcaster and politician.

Fleming was a news reporter for several Toronto radio stations, eventually becoming co-anchor of CHFI morning news, which was simulcast on both CHFI-FM and what was then CHFI-AM. He was the newscaster on Bright and Early on CTV, Canada's first TV network morning news and public affairs show. The show aired in the 1966-67 television season and was not renewed. He also hosted a number of CTV public affairs specials including an interview with John Lennon during his and Yoko Ono's Give Peace A Chance tour of Canada.

Fleming entered politics and was elected to the House of Commons of Canada in the 1972 election as the Liberal Member of Parliament for York West riding in the Toronto area. He was elected chair of the Ontario Liberal caucus by his peers. He served as parliamentary secretary to the Minister of Communications from 1975 to 1976, and then as parliamentary secretary to the Minister of the Environment.

Following the 1980 election, Fleming was named to the cabinet of Prime Minister Pierre Trudeau as Minister of State for Multiculturalism. As minister, he was responsible for ensuring multiculturalism was included in the drafting of the Canadian Charter of Rights and Freedoms. He also won cabinet approval for the creation of a special parliamentary Committee on Race Relations, had his department sponsor a national Conference on Race Relations and the Law, and provided government support for a national conference on the challenges faced by immigrant women.

Fleming was dropped from cabinet in August 1983. He was offered and appointment to the Canadian Senate but declined and did not run in the 1984 election.

Fleming returned to work in radio and wrote a column for the Toronto Sun.

Fleming died on February 15, 2023, at the age of 83.

== Electoral record ==
1980 Canadian federal election: York West
Party	Candidate	Votes	%	±%
Liberal	James Fleming	21,385	56.8	+9.7
New Democratic	Elio Costa	8,884	23.6	-3.4
Progressive Conservative	Don Cleveland	7,101	18.8	-6.0
Libertarian	Scott Hughes	194	0.5	-0.1
Communist	Nan McDonald	85	0.2	-0.2
Marxist–Leninist	Dagmar M. Rappold	29	0.1	-0.1
Total valid votes		37,678	100.0	
lop.parl.ca

1979 Canadian federal election: York West
Party	Candidate	Votes	%	±%
Liberal	James Fleming	18,410	47.0	-5.9
Progressive Conservative	Robert Michener	10,572	27.0	+1.1
New Democratic	Elio Costa	9,712	24.8	+5.7
Libertarian	Dan A. Kornitzer	246	0.6	
Communist	Gordon Flowers	151	0.4	+0.1
Marxist–Leninist	Dagmar M. Rappold	54	0.1	0.0
Total valid votes		39,145	100.0	

1974 Canadian federal election: York West
Party	Candidate	Votes	%	±%
Liberal	James Fleming	28,075	52.9	+13.4
Progressive Conservative	John Hanna	13,734	25.9	-0.7
New Democratic	Freda Hawkins	10,139	19.1	-13.9
Independent	Jim Laxer^{1}	674	1.3	
Independent	Thomas Frazer	215	0.4	
Communist	George Harris	134	0.3	
Marxist–Leninist	Christine A. Nugent	71	0.1	
Total valid votes		53,042	100.0	
Source: lop.parl.ca^{1} Movement for an Independent Socialist Canada

1972 Canadian federal election: York West
Party	Candidate	Votes	%	±%
Liberal	James Fleming	22,270	39.5	-5.3
New Democratic	Val Scott	18,639	33.1	-2.5
Progressive Conservative	Clem Nusca	14,997	26.6	+8.3
Social Credit	David Horwood	237	0.4	
Independent	John Bizzell	167	0.3	
Independent	Sean Daly	84	0.1	
Total valid votes		56,394	100.0	
