= Charlie Riina =

Polish-Canadian model, actress and activist

- Born: Ania Krosinska; Poland
- Modeling information
- Height: 5 ft 8 in (1.73 m)
- Hair color: Brunette
- Eye color: Brown
- Agency: http://shaffer-roff.com/
- Website: charlieriina.com

Charlie Riina (born Ania Krosinska) is a Polish-born Canadian model, actress and activist.

Riina moved to Canada at a young age.

== Career ==
Riina was twice Miss Hawaiian Tropic, and was also crowned Miss Toronto.

After appearing on the cover of Playboy magazine (United States) in 2011, she has been featured twice on Playboy's online version, and she has appeared on the cover of Playboy's Poland, Slovakia, Hungary editions. Riina earned the title of "Playmate" (featured as the centerfold in the magazine) on more than one occasion, and she was named "Playmate of the Year" for Slovakia in 2016.

In 2015, Riina was featured in GQ magazine, Esquire magazine, and FHM, including a multiple-page feature in the special international edition "Girls of FHM".

In 2016, she was featured in Maxim magazine, and was also featured as Sports Illustrated's "Lovely Lady of the Day".

In 2017, Riina was featured in Lifestyle for Men magazine.

Riina's acting credits include The Handmaid's Tale (2017) and All-In (2012).

== Politics ==
Riina has been active in conservative politics in the Toronto area under her given name, Ania Krosinska.

In 2016, Riina stood in a provincial by-election under the name Ania Krosinska in the riding of in the Scarborough-Rouge River with the minor right-wing Trillium Party. Riina placed last with 36 votes (0.14%).

In 2019, Riina stood for federal office, contesting the riding of Humber River--Black Creek with the right-wing Peoples Party of Canada. Riina placed 5 out of 7 candidates with 402 votes (1.1%).

== Electoral record ==
=== Federal ===
2019 Canadian federal election: Humber River—Black Creek
| Party | Candidate | Votes | % | ±% | Expenditures |
|---|---|---|---|---|---|
| Liberal | Judy Sgro | 23,187 | 61.1 | -5.81 | $93,410.00 |
| New Democratic | Maria Augimeri | 7,198 | 19.0 | +8.06 | $18,120.64 |
| Conservative | Iftikhar Choudry | 6,164 | 16.3 | -3.96 | $3,300.00 |
| Green | Mike Schmitz | 804 | 2.1 | +0.47 | none listed |
| People's | Ania Krosinska | 402 | 1.1 | – | none listed |
| United | Stenneth Smith | 114 | 0.3 | - | $0.00 |
| Marxist–Leninist | Christine Nugent | 89 | 0.2 | -0.36 | $0.00 |
| Total valid votes/expense limit | | 37,958 | 100.0 | | |
| Total rejected ballots | | 503 | | | |
| Turnout | | 38,461 | 56.8 | | |
| Eligible voters | | 67,656 | | | |
| Liberal hold | | Swing | | -6.94 | |
Source: Elections Canada

=== Provincial ===
Ontario provincial by-election, September 1, 2016 Resignation of Bas Balkissoon
| Party | Candidate | Votes | % | ±% |
|---|---|---|---|---|
| Progressive Conservative | Raymond Cho | 9,693 | 38.58 | +10.92 |
| Liberal | Piragal Thiru | 7,264 | 28.91 | -9.79 |
| New Democratic | Neethan Shan | 6,883 | 27.40 | -3.91 |
| Independent | Queenie Yu | 582 | 2.32 | |
| Green | Priyan De Silva | 217 | 0.86 | -0.51 |
| Libertarian | Allen Small | 146 | 0.58 | |
| None of the Above | Above Znoneofthe | 135 | 0.54 | -0.42 |
| Freedom | Wayne Simmons | 76 | 0.30 | |
| People's Political Party | Dwight McLean | 56 | 0.22 | |
| Pauper | John Turmel | 37 | 0.15 | |
| Trillium | Ania Krosinska | 36 | 0.14 | |
| Total valid votes | | 25,125 | 100.00 | |
| Progressive Conservative gain from Liberal | | Swing | | +10.36 |
