= Mario Gentile =

Canadian politician (born 1948/49)

Mario Gentile (b. 1948 or 1949) is a former municipal politician in Toronto, Ontario, Canada. He served as a councillor and city controller in North York, and was also a member of the Metropolitan Toronto council. His political career ended with a criminal conviction in 1994.

== Early life and career ==
Gentile was born in Apulia, in the south east of Italy, and moved to Canada as a young adult. After his arrival there he worked as a welder before moving into selling insurance, building up a strong network of clients in the Italian-Canadian community. He left the insurance business in 1979 to open a travel agency.

== Municipal politician ==
Gentile was elected to represent North York's second ward in 1976, following a failed bid in 1974. He was the first person of Italian-Canadian background to serve on the North York council. He also received an appointment to the Metro Toronto council in 1980, after an unsuccessful attempt in 1978. He remained a ward councillor in North York until early 1988, when he was appointed to replace the late Esther Shiner on the city's Board of Control. He had also re-appointed to Metro Council in 1982 and 1985.

Gentile sought election to the Metro Board of Police Commissioners in December 1984, but lost to Art Eggleton. He later served as chairman of the Metro works committee.

Gentile was affiliated with the Liberal Party and the Progressive Conservative Party at different times in his career. He announced his intention to seek the Progressive Conservative nomination in Downsview for the 1985 provincial election, but withdrew before nomination day.

Gentile was generally on the right wing of council. He was one of only three North York councillors to oppose a resolution which called for a boycott of South Africa for its apartheid policies in 1986, arguing that the measure was beyond the scope of a municipal council. He later opposed efforts to make municipal titles gender-neutral, and said that he still wanted to be recognized as an "alderman" when his title was formally changed to "councillor". He was a vocal critic of Sunday shopping extensions in 1988. Like Esther Shiner, whom he replaced on the Board of Control, Gentile supported extending the Spadina Expressway into downtown Toronto.

Gentile indicated in 1988 that he wanted to run for Mayor of North York at some point in the future, but would wait for incumbent mayor Mel Lastman to retire. He was an ally of Lastman on council, and once described him as "unbeatable".

Toronto's political system was restructured in 1988, as the regional Boards of Control were eliminated and the direct election of Metro councillors introduced. Gentile won an easy victory over Angelo Natale to represent North York's Humber ward on Metro, and was re-elected without opposition in 1991. He sought an appointment to the Metro Executive in 1988, but was unsuccessful. In January 1989, Gentile was appointed as chair of the board of governors for Exhibition Place. In April 1991, he recommended that the city work with the private firm Metrex Centre Inc. to create an international trade centre on the Exhibition grounds.

Gentile criticized certain Ontario municipalities for declaring themselves officially unilingual in 1990, and brought forward a successful motion which re-confirmed Metro's support for official bilingualism in Canada. He described the trend toward English-only municipalities as "bigotry" targeted at minority language groups.

In 1989, he was the victim of a break-in where a burglar took $10,000 in cash and $50,000 worth of property from his house. In early 1992, Gentile argued that fellow councillor Norman Gardner should not be charged after shooting a would-be robber his family-owned bakery. He argued that Gardner, a friend of several years, would not use a firearm carelessly.

He continued to oppose employment equity policies in 1993.

== Arrest and conviction ==
Criminal charges were laid against Gentile in late 1991, following his acclamation to city council but before the actual election. He was charged with five counts of municipal corruption, two charges of breach of trust, and five counts of accepting a secret commission. Gentile spoke to the media on the day the charges were laid, and said that he looked forward to a full exoneration. He was quoted as saying, "My conscience is clear ... My hand was not shaking when I signed the arrest papers with the police". Following an expansion of the criminal probe in 1992, he was charged with an additional one count of breach of trust, five counts of municipal corruption and five counts of accepting payoffs. He again denied the charges. Gentile continued to serve on Metro council following the charges.

Nine of the charges against Gentile were dismissed in March 1993. In May of the same year, a judge ruled that he would stand trial for two counts of breach of trust and nine counts of receiving secret commissions. During the resulting trial, it was revealed that Gentile had accepted several gifts from jailed developer Lou Charles over a period of several years. Charles denied that there was anything improper about the gifts, and said that he considered Gentile to be like "a son". Gentile acknowledged receiving the gifts, but said Charles was neither promised nor received preferential treatment in return.

In June 1994, Gentile was found guilty of one count of breach of trust and seven counts of receiving commissions. He continued to protest his innocence, although he later acknowledged that he had made errors in judgement in his relationship with Charles. After some hesitation, he announced his resignation from council on August 10, 1994. In September, Gentile was sentenced to two years in prison and fined $92,000. He was also found guilty of four offences under the Income Tax Act in November 1994, for failure to declare almost $200,000 in gifts from Charles. He was fined $58,648.49. One day after this conviction, Gentile pleaded guilty to a further charge of breach-of-trust relating to a 1987 trip to Las Vegas paid for by a firm that had just received a contract for garbage disposal in North York. He was given day parole in May 1995.

Gentile considered running for municipal council again in 1997, but withdrew before the vote. He was presented with a ceremonial key to the city of North York by Mel Lastman in October 1997, just prior to the city's amalgamation into the new City of Toronto.

In February 2000, he announced that he would be a candidate for Toronto City Council's twelfth ward in the municipal election to be held later in the year. Mel Lastman described his decision as "unfortunate," adding that Gentile was making a mockery of the election. He finished third against Frank Di Giorgio.
