= Peter Li Preti =

Toronto City Councillor for (Ward 8) York West
- In office December 1, 2000 – November 30, 2006
- Preceded by: Ward established
- Succeeded by: Anthony Perruzza

Toronto City Councillor for (Ward 7) - Black Creek
- In office January 1, 1998 – November 30, 2000
- Preceded by: Ward established
- Succeeded by: Ward abolished

North York City Councillor for Ward 3
- In office June 1985 – December 31, 1997
- Preceded by: Claudio Polsinelli
- Succeeded by: Ward abolished

Personal details
- Born: 1951 or 1952 (age 74–75)
- Profession: Psychologist

Peter Li Preti (born 1951 or 1952) was a city councillor in Toronto, Ontario, Canada, who represented one of the two York West wards from 1985 to 2006.

== Background ==
Li Preti received a B.A. and M.A. at the University of Toronto and went on to complete a Masters of Education in School Psychology and Clinical Counselling. He later achieved a Doctorate in Clinical Psychology, and practised as a psychometrist. Li Preti is founder and president of the Family and Individual Psychoneurological Assessment Centre.

== North York city councillor ==
Li Preti was appointed to fill a vacancy on North York City Council in 1985 when former alderman Claudio Polsinelli ran for a seat in the provincial legislature. Representing the troubled Jane and Finch, he campaigned for development in the area, including extending the Spadina subway. He also argued that the media was biased against the region, and attempted to set up a fund that would sue for libel any media outlet that spoke negatively of the area.

== Federal politics ==
Prior to the 1993 federal election, Li Preti had sought the Liberal Party nomination in the York Centre riding. However, Liberal leader Jean Chrétien directly appointed Art Eggleton to run in the seat. Besides Li Preti and his supporters, the appointment was criticized by several high profile Toronto Liberals including Joe Volpe, Dennis Mills, and John Nunziata. Allegations of racism against Italian-Canadians were also levelled. After battling Chrétien in the media and in the courts, Li Preti eventually chose to run as an independent, branding himself an "independent Liberal" using the Liberal colour red, and promising voters he would ask to join the Liberal caucus in House of Commons if elected. Li Preti came under some criticism for potentially misleading some voters as to his affiliation with the party. Unlike the pro-choice Eggleton, he took an anti-abortion position. He emphasized his support for industrial development in many of the CFB Downsview lands in the riding that were being decommissioned. Li Preti came in a distant second, winning 3,918 votes to Eggleton's 27,150.

== Toronto city councillor ==
In 1997 when North York was merged with Toronto and the other parts of Metro to form the new "megacity", he was elected to the new Toronto City Council in the 1997 municipal elections. He was also elected in 2000 and 2003 elections.

In the 2006 municipal election he sought re-election against former North York colleague Anthony Perruzza. Several incidents occurred during advanced polling on the weekend of November 4–5, 2006, leading to Li Preti and Perruzza accusing each other of dirty campaigning and the breaking of numerous elections. Perruzza beat him by 579 votes. The contest was repeated in the 2010 municipal election with Peruzza prevailing by 352 votes.

Following his loss, Li Preti was found to have cheated in his 2010 election campaign. A forensic audit ordered by the City of Toronto’s Compliance Audit Committee determined that Li Preti had, contrary to Ontario’s Municipal Elections Act, accepted 46 corporate contributions and overspent his campaign spending limit by $3,065 or 13% (subscription required).

== Election results ==
2010 Toronto election, Ward 8
Candidate	Votes	%
Anthony Perruzza	4,724	41.5
Peter Li Preti	4,372	38.4
Antonius Clarke	1,487	13.1
Arthur Smitherman	268	2.4
Naseeb Husain	243	2.1
John Gallagher	129	1.1
Ramnarine Tiwari	117	1.0
Gerardo Miniguano	53	0.5
Total	11,393	100

Unofficial results as of October 26, 2010 03:55 am

2006 Toronto municipal election: Councillor, Ward Eight
Candidate	Votes	%
Anthony Perruzza	4,738	45.70
(x)Peter Li Preti	4,159	40.1
Hau Dang Tan	734	7.08
Garry Green	371	3.58
Ramnarine Tiwari	193	1.86
Abdulhaq Omar	173	1.67
Total valid votes	10,368	100.00
