= Ward 7 Humber River—Black Creek =

Municipal council district in Toronto, Ontario, Canada

- Constituency for the Toronto City Council
- Location of Ward 7 in Toronto
- City: Toronto
- Population: 108,035 (2016)

Current constituency
- Created: 2018
- Councillor: Anthony Perruzza
- Community council: North York
- Created from: Ward 7 York West; Ward 8 York West
- First contested: 2018 election
- Last contested: 2026 election
- Ward profile: www.toronto.ca/ward-7-humber-river-black-creek/

Ward 7 Humber River—Black Creek is a municipal electoral division in Toronto, Ontario, Canada that has been represented in the Toronto City Council since the 2018 municipal election. It was last contested in 2026, with Anthony Perruzza elected councillor.

== Boundaries ==
On August 14, 2018, the Government of Ontario redrew municipal boundaries via the Better Local Government Act, 2018, S.O. 2018, c. 11 - Bill 5. This means that the 25 provincial electoral districts and the 25 municipal wards in Toronto currently share the same geographic borders.

Defined in legislation as:

Consisting of that part of the City of Toronto described as follows: commencing at the intersection of the northerly limit of said city with Keele Street; thence southerly along said street to Grandravine Drive; thence generally westerly along said drive to Black Creek; thence generally southeasterly along said creek to Sheppard Avenue West; thence westerly along said avenue to Jane Street; thence southerly along said street to Highway No. 401; thence westerly along said highway to the Humber River; thence generally northwesterly along said river to the northerly limit of said city; thence easterly along said limit to the point of commencement.

== History ==
=== 2018 Boundary Adjustment ===
Toronto municipal ward boundaries were significantly modified in 2018 during the election campaign. Ultimately the new ward structure was used and later upheld by the Supreme Court of Canada in 2021.

The current ward is an amalgamation of the old Ward 7 York West (western section), the old Ward 8 York West (eastern section).

=== 2018 municipal election ===
Ward 7 Humber River—Black Creek was first contested during the 2018 municipal election. Ward-8 incumbent Anthony Perruzza, ran against Ward 11 incumbent-Giorgio Mammoliti, and six other candidates. Perruzza was ultimately elected with 36.80 per cent of the vote.

== Geography ==
Humber River—Black Creek is part of the North York community council.

Ward 7 is bound on the west by the Humber River, and on the east by Keele Street. The northern boundary is Steeles Avenue (the city limit), and the southern boundary is Grandravine Drive, Black Creek, Sheppard Avenue, Jane Street and Highway 401.

== Councillors ==
Council term	Member	
Council term	Ward 7 York West	Ward 8 York West
2000–2003	Giorgio Mammoliti	Peter Li Preti
2003–2006	Giorgio Mammoliti	Peter Li Preti
2006–2010	Giorgio Mammoliti	Anthony Perruzza
2010–2014	Giorgio Mammoliti	Anthony Perruzza
2014–2018	Giorgio Mammoliti	Anthony Perruzza
	Ward 7 Humber River—Black Creek	
2018–2022	Anthony Perruzza	
2022–2026	Anthony Perruzza	
2026–2030	Anthony Perruzza	

== Election results ==
2026 Toronto municipal election

Candidate	Votes	%	minus
Anthony Perruzza (X)	15,947	66.38	5.08 ▲
Amanda Coombs	6,097	25.38	9.31 ▲
Lorna Antwi	1,979	8.24	–

2022 Toronto Municipal Election

Candidate	Vote	%
Anthony Perruzza (X)	8,707	61.30
Christopher Mammoliti	3,215	22.63
Amanda Coombs	2,282	16.07

2018 Toronto municipal election, Ward 7 Humber River—Black Creek
Candidate	Votes	Vote share
Anthony Perruzza	8,336	36.80%
Giorgio Mammoliti	5,625	24.83%
Deanna Sgro	4,512	19.92%
Tiffany Ford	3,187	14.07%
Amanda Coombs	445	1.96%
Winston La Rose	247	1.09%
Kerry-Ann Thomas	153	0.68%
Kristy-Ann Charles	147	0.65%
Total	22,652	100%
Source: City of Toronto

== See also ==
- Municipal elections in Canada
- Municipal government of Toronto
- List of Toronto municipal elections
