= Odoardo Di Santo =

Canadian politician (born 1934)

Ontario MPP
- In office 1975–1985
- Preceded by: Vern Singer
- Succeeded by: Joseph Cordiano
- Constituency: Downsview

Personal details
- Born: June 25, 1934 (age 91) Rocca Pia, Italy
- Party: New Democrat
- Spouse: Maria Augimeri
- Occupation: Paralegal

Odoardo Di Santo (born June 25, 1934) is a politician and administrator in Ontario, Canada. He served in the Legislative Assembly of Ontario from 1975 to 1985, as a member of the New Democratic Party (NDP).

== Background ==
Di Santo was born in Rocca Pia, Italy, and educated at the University of Rome. In Rome, Di Santo was a professional journalist as well as press secretary for the Italian minister of industry and commerce. He was a member of the Family Services Association of Metro Toronto in 1974–1975, and was an advisor to the Board of Community Workers at George Brown College. Di Santo was also a founding member as well as a federal executive on the Congress of Italian-Canadians in this period. He was also a founding member of the Italian-Canadian Benevolent Corporation. He is married to Toronto city councillor Maria Augimeri.

== Politics ==
He was elected to the Ontario legislature in the 1975 provincial election, defeating Liberal candidate Mike Spensieri by 68 votes in Downsview as part of an NDP breakthrough in Toronto's Italian community. He was re-elected by a greater margin in the 1977 election, and defeated future federal cabinet minister Joseph Volpe by 653 votes in the 1981 election. He supported Bob Rae for the party leadership in 1982.

Di Santo was narrowly defeated in the 1985 election, losing to Liberal candidate Joseph Cordiano by 221 votes.

== Later life ==
After the election, the Liberals and NDP signed a two-year pact which ended forty-two years of Progressive Conservative rule. After leaving the legislature, Di Santo was appointed director of the Office of the Worker Adviser.

The New Democratic Party won a majority government under Bob Rae's leadership in the 1990 provincial election, and Di Santo was appointed as chair of Ontario Workers' Compensation Board in 1991. During his tenure as chair, he implemented progressive policies, such as the non-rebuttable presumption that workers exposed to asbestos in the workplace be compensated for their injuries or illnesses - a novelty at the time. In 1994, Rae transferred Di Santo to the Liquor License Board of Ontario.

In 1992, Di Santo was president and founder of Casa Abruzzo, a non-profit for independent seniors.

He campaigned for the House of Commons of Canada in the 1997 federal election, but finished third against independent candidate John Nunziata in York South—Weston.
