= Drew McCreadie =

Drew McCreadie (born 1967) is a Vancouver, British Columbia writer and comedian. He is a past winner of Best Male Improvisor in Canada. McCreadie wrote and directed a short film The Valet, that won him The Most Promising Director of a Canadian Short Film at the Vancouver International Film Festival. He co-wrote an episode of Casper Scare School (credited as Andrew McCreadie) with co-writer Ian Boothby.

He was a member of Urban Improv improvisation and Canadian Content sketch troupe, whose members have/do include The Simpsons comic book writer Ian Boothby, Comedy Inc. star Roman Danylo and Air Farce actress Penelope Corrin. He has performed with improv and sketch comedy company The Second City onboard NCL Cruiseline. As a member of the sketch group "Canadian Content", McCreadie can be heard on the group's three albums Official Bootleg, Sorry, and Canuxploitation.

He is the author of several books including an instructional book titled You Will Never Be Funny: An Introduction to Improvised Comedy, a satirical self-help book GO GET HELP!, and a comedic novel A Test Case of Life.

McCreadie also plays electric guitar, and has performed as a studio musician on hiphop artist UNDA's album Tomorrow Never Comes, and on The Sailing Conductor's Album AAA (Thousand Miles Away). He is one half of the 'wank jazz' duo Knoodle (with John Murphy) who have released an album, the digital download of which is $7,000 (although all tracks are free individually). He has also released several albums of original music including What You Get, Living Like a Hobo, But With Money, and The Out Zone.

In 2011, he moved to Thailand, and joined a Bangkok-based improv comedy company Improv Bangkok.

Before moving to Vancouver, McCreadie ran for provincial government in Ontario in the 1987 general election as the Progressive Conservative candidate in the electoral district of Downsview. He also ran a controversial campaign to head the student union in his second year of studies at Toronto's York University and won a term as President of the York Student Federation (YSF) in 1987–1988. McCreadie served as President of his highschool, Cawthra Park Secondary School, in 1985–1986.
