= Anthony Perruzza =

Canadian politician (born 1959/60)

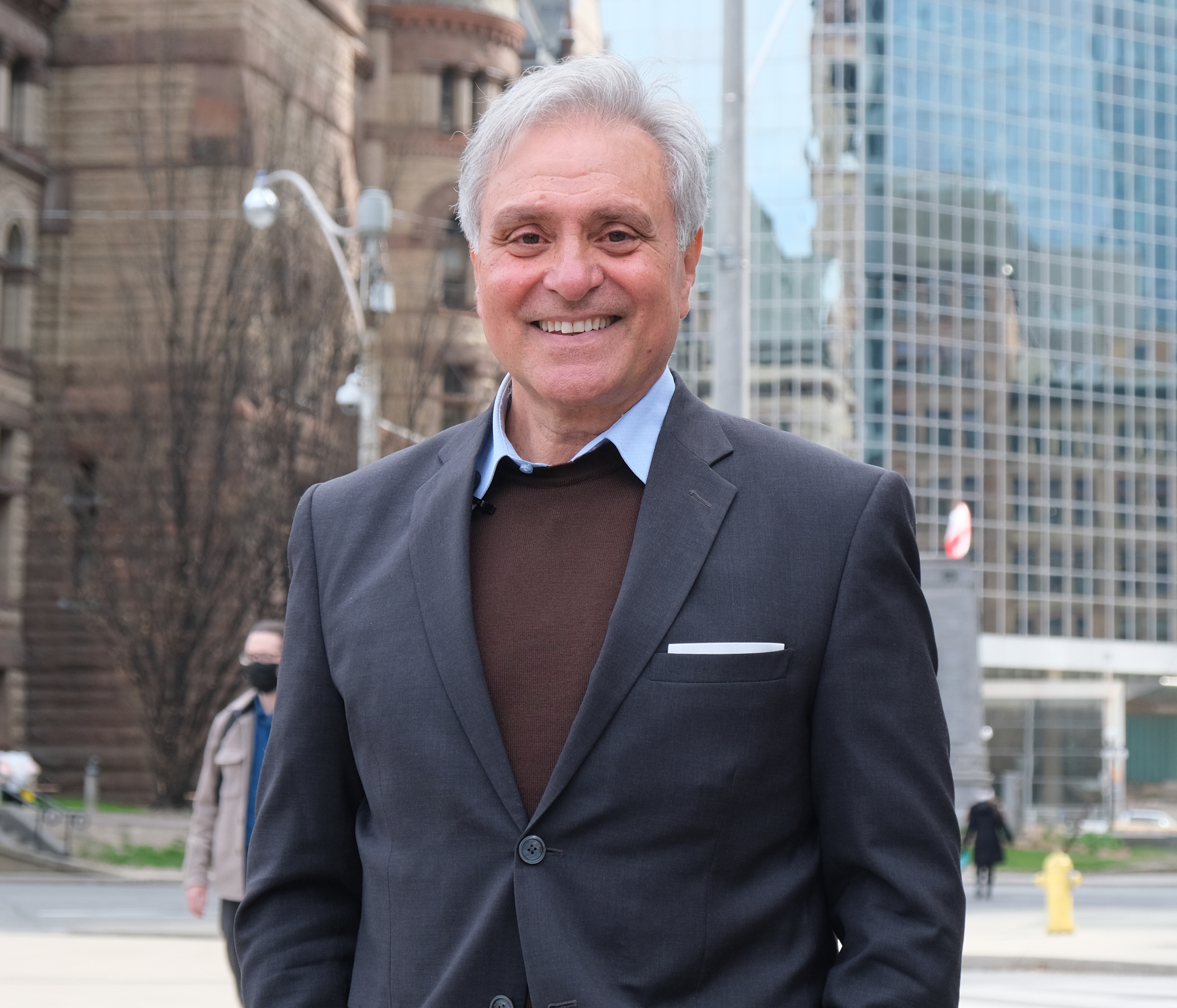
- Perruzza in 2023

Toronto City Councillor for Ward 7 Humber River—Black Creek
- Incumbent
- Assumed office December 1, 2018
- Preceded by: Ward created

Toronto City Councillor for Ward 8 York West
- In office December 1, 2006 – December 1, 2018
- Preceded by: Peter Li Preti
- Succeeded by: Ward dissolved

Member of Provincial Parliament for Downsview
- In office September 6, 1990 – June 7, 1995
- Preceded by: Laureano Leone
- Succeeded by: Annamarie Castrilli

North York City Councillor for Ward 5
- In office December 1, 1988 – December 1, 1990
- Preceded by: Maria Augimeri
- Succeeded by: Claudio Polsinelli

Metro Toronto Separate School Trustee for Ward 15
- In office December 1, 1985 – December 1, 1988
- Preceded by: Tony Nigro
- Succeeded by: Rick Morelli

Personal details
- Born: 1959 or 1960 (age 66–67) Italy
- Party: Independent (Municipal politicians are elected on a non-partisan basis in Toronto)
- Other political affiliations: New Democratic
- Website: perruzza.ca

Anthony Perruzza (/pəˈruːtsə/ pə-ROOT-sə, Italian: [perˈruttsa]; born 1959 or 1960) is a Canadian politician who has served on Toronto City Council since 2006. He currently represents Ward 7 Humber River—Black Creek. Perruzza was a North York councillor from 1988 to 1990, and served in the Legislative Assembly of Ontario from 1990 to 1995 as a member of the New Democratic Party (NDP). Perruzza was a candidate for mayor of Toronto in the 2023 by-election, placing tenth.

== Early life ==
Perruzza moved to Canada at age nine, and was raised in a working-class family in North York. He became a carpenter in his teens and paid his way through university. He studied history and political science at York University.

== Political career ==
He first campaigned for the North York city council in a November 1984 by-election for the city's first ward. A newspaper report from the campaign lists him as a twenty-six-year-old businessman and part-time student. Perruzza supported property tax cuts and the creation of a local recreation centre. He lost to Mario Sergio in a crowded field of candidates.

=== School trustee ===
Perruzza campaigned for a seat on the Metro Toronto Separate School Board (Catholic school board) in the 1985 municipal election, and narrowly defeated incumbent trustee Tony Nigro to win Ward 15. Early newspaper reports actually indicated that Nigro was the winner, before the final polling data was received.

In February 1986, Perruzza informed the media that board members were secretly considering cutbacks of up to $4.7 million to school various programs. He said he was making the information available because "the public should be given an opportunity to voice their concerns before the cuts are made". Some trustees criticized his decision. Perruzza later spoke against a board decision to prevent public nurses from teaching sex education in separate schools, and urged Catholic grade schools to accept non-Catholic students, describing existing bans as discriminatory.

=== North York councillor ===
After serving one term as a trustee, Perruzza campaigned a second time for the North York City Council in the 1988 municipal election. The election was marked by an unusual controversy, as one of his opponents was caught trying to throw away 161 Perruzza election signs at York University at 3:30 in the morning. Perruzza was elected without difficulty in the city's fifth ward, and became the only New Democrat on the new council.

Perruzza criticized some development initiatives proposed by North York Mayor Mel Lastman, including a plan to build condominiums on land owned by York University. He accused his council colleagues of shirking their responsibility to provide affordable housing, and spoke against Lastman's effort to institute a mandatory fee for North York municipal candidates, describing the plan as a "price tag on democracy that will favor incumbents". He was appointed to the North York Board of Health in 1989.

In early 1990, Perruzza recommended that North York license and regulate its previously-illegal rooming houses and basement apartments. He argued that the city had an obligation to provide protection to tenants and improve living conditions, but could not do so as long as the dwellings had no legal status. He opposed an 8.4 per cent property tax increase in the same period, and suggested that the city transfer $11.7 million from its planned performing arts centre to make up the necessary operational funds. He argued that developers were being given tax breaks, while residents were required to contribute more at the onset of a recession.

=== Member of Provincial Parliament ===
Perruzza campaigned for the Ontario legislature in the 1990 provincial election, challenging Liberal incumbent Laureano Leone in Downsview. One of Perruzza's main campaign promises was to fight the decentralization of government services, which had resulted in the loss of more than 1,400 government jobs from the riding. He also called for market value property tax assessment in Toronto, so as to provide substantial tax reductions for many of his residents. Perruzza defeated Leone as the NDP won the election and formed a majority government.

Perruzza's election to the provincial legislature meant that he was forced to relinquish his seat on council. He criticized North York councillors for choosing to appoint his replacement, rather than calling a by-election. When it became obvious that no by-election would take place, Perruzza called for Mike Foster to be appointed to his seat. The council instead chose Claudio Polsinelli, a defeated Liberal candidate. Some North York councillors accused Perruzza of billing the city for stationery and business cards for use in his provincial campaign. Perruzza denied this, acknowledging that he ordered a significant amount of paper in 1990 but saying that none of it went toward his provincial campaign.

Perruzza and fellow MPP George Mammoliti supported a fight led by community residents to rebuild the York Woods Library Theatre in 1992. The following year, he announced his support for a compromise Metro Toronto tax reform plan that reflected the interests of both downtown and North York residents. In 1994, he pushed for greater accountability in the social housing trade. Late in his term, Perruzza supported the construction of a new community centre on Jane Street near Grandravine.

On June 9, 1994, Perruzza was one of twelve New Democratic Party MPPs to vote against Bill 167, legislation that would have provided same-sex couples with rights and obligations (including family benefits) equal to opposite-sex common law couples. The NDP had officially endorsed the bill, but allowed the issue to be decided by "free vote". The bill was defeated by a vote of 68-59. If the twelve dissenting New Democratic Party MPPs had voted for the motion, it would have passed.

Perruzza held five parliamentary assistant positions between 1990 and 1995. The NDP lost the 1995 provincial election, and Perruzza was beaten by Liberal candidate Annamarie Castrilli in Downsview.

=== Return to municipal politics ===
Perruzza returned to municipal politics after his provincial defeat. With the amalgamation of North York into the City of Toronto, he campaigned for the new city's seventh ward council seat in the 1997 municipal election. He was endorsed by the Toronto Star newspaper, but finished fourth in the two-member ward.

He campaigned for Toronto City Council's redistributed eighth ward, which includes the Jane and Finch area, in the 2000 municipal election. He was endorsed by the Toronto Star, the Canadian Union of Public Employees and the Ontario Public Service Employees Union. He was narrowly defeated by Peter Li Preti.

Perruzza challenged Li Preti again in the 2003 municipal election, charging that his opponent was negligent in defending the rights of tenants. He was again endorsed by the Toronto Star. Li Preti was re-elected by a reduced margin.

Perruzza challenged Li Preti a third time in the 2006 municipal election. He called for a licensing system for landlords, and focused on community safety issues.

Several incidents occurred during advanced polling on the weekend of November 4–5, 2006, leading to Perruzza and Li Preti accusing one another of dirty campaigning and the breaking of numerous election and criminal laws. Among other claims, each candidate accused staff from the opposing campaign of interfering with elections staff, campaigning illegally at polling locations and intimidating their opponent's voters. No criminal charges were laid by police. However, in a completely unprecedented move, the City of Toronto hired off-duty police officers at a cost of approximately $23,200 to guard all 40 voting locations in the ward on election day to assure that voters would remain safe and free from harassment.

Perruzza defeated Li Preti on election day, winning the Ward Eight seat by a margin of about 5 per cent. He is an ally of Toronto Mayor David Miller, who was re-elected over challenger Jane Pitfield.

==== On council ====
After the 2006 election, Perruzza was appointed to serve on the Licensing and Standards Committee, the Toronto Transit Commission and the audit committee. He was also named vice-chair of the North York Community Council. Perruzza has reiterated his call for a licensing system for landlords, and supports increased public transit in Toronto's York Region. He openly supports LGBT rights, and has shown this in his support of The 519 Church Street Community Centre.

He formerly served on the 2010 to 2014 Executive Committee and was the Chair of the Community Development and Recreation Committee in 2013 and 2014.

In 2015 Perruzza launched DUKE Heights Business Improvement Area, which worked to revitalize local businesses and attract new investment to the area. Perruzza has been committed to improving public spaces in his ward. He worked to revitalize local parks, including partnering with multiple stakeholders to revitalize Driftwood Parkette in 2016. Perruzza was a strong advocate for improving public transit in Toronto. He supported the construction of the Toronto-York Spadina Subway Extension, which brought subway service to his ward.

In 2020, after Metrolinx reneged on a long held promise to hand over land at the Maintenance and Storage Facility of the Finch West LRT for a community hub in the Jane-Finch community, Perruzza voiced his concerns to the executives of Metrolinx and the media over the broken promise. After much pressure from Perruzza, other local politicians and community, Metrolinx retracted their statement and promised to make the land available at a nominal cost.

Perruzza, who’s ward includes Toronto’s most diverse and lowest income neighbourhoods, served as the City of Toronto’s Poverty reduction advocate from 2018 to 2022. In his role he advocated for more affordable transit for low income families.

Through his position on Toronto City Council, Perruzza currently sits on the following committees and Boards: Etobicoke York Community Council, Infrastructure and Environment Committee, Toronto and Region Conservation Authority, Exhibition Place Board of Governors, Hockey Hall of Fame Board of Directors.

In 2026, Perruzza's measure to create a city-run grocery store pilot program passed council.

=== 2023 mayoral by-election ===
On April 12, 2023, Perruzza announced his campaign for mayor of Toronto in the 2023 by-election, releasing a statement that, if elected, he would oppose increases in property taxes, transit fares and user fees. He also said he would negotiate with the federal and provincial governments to secure stable funding. Perruzza finished tenth among 102 candidates, receiving 3,025 votes (0.42%). The election was won by Olivia Chow.

== Personal life ==
Perruzza and his wife Keyla are raising their two children in North York. They share their home with their elderly parents.

== Electoral record ==
2026 Toronto municipal election, Ward 7 Humber River—Black Creek
Candidate	Votes	%	minus
Anthony Perruzza (X)	15,947	66.38	5.08 ▲
Amanda Coombs	6,097	25.38	9.31 ▲
Lorna Antwi	1,979	8.24	–

2022 Toronto municipal election, Ward 7 Humber River—Black Creek
Candidate	Votes	Vote share
Anthony Perruzza	8,707	61.30%
Chris Mammoliti	3,215	22.64%
Amanda Coombs	2,282	16.06%
Total	14,204	100%
Source: City of Toronto

2018 Toronto municipal election, Ward 7 Humber River—Black Creek
Candidate	Votes	Vote share
Anthony Perruzza	8,336	36.80%
Giorgio Mammoliti	5,625	24.83%
Deanna Sgro	4,512	19.92%
Tiffany Ford	3,187	14.07%
Amanda Coombs	445	1.96%
Winston La Rose	247	1.09%
Kerry-Ann Thomas	153	0.68%
Kristy-Ann Charles	147	0.65%
Total	22,652	100%
Source: City of Toronto

2014 Toronto election, Ward 8
Candidate	Votes	%
Anthony Perruzza	8,705	71.10%
Arthur Smitherman	1,326	10.83%
Suzanne Narain	852	6.96%
Princess Boucher	524	4.28%
Antonio Vescio	431	3.52%
Thomas Barclay	406	3.32%
Total	12,244	100%

2010 Toronto election, Ward 8
Candidate	Votes	%
Anthony Perruzza	4,724	41.464%
Peter Li Preti	4,372	38.374%
Antonius Clarke	1,487	13.052%
Arthur Smitherman	268	2.352%
Naseeb Husain	243	2.133%
John Gallagher	129	1.132%
Ramnarine Tiwari	117	1.027%
Gerardo Miniguano	53	0.465%
Total	11,393	100%

2006 Toronto municipal election: Councillor, Ward Eight
Candidate	Votes	%
Anthony Perruzza	4,738	45.70
(x)Peter Li Preti	4,159	40.1
Hau Dang Tan	734	7.08
Garry Green	371	3.58
Ramnarine Tiwari	193	1.86
Abdulhaq Omar	173	1.67
Total valid votes	10,368	100.00

2003 Toronto municipal election: Councillor, Ward Eight
Candidate	Votes	%
(x)Peter Li Preti	4,670	52.53
Anthony Perruzza	4,220	47.47
Total valid votes	8,890	100.00

2000 Toronto municipal election: Councillor, Ward Eight
Candidate	Votes	%
(x)Peter Li Preti	5,363	56.49
Anthony Perruzza	4,131	43.51
Total valid votes	9,494	100.00

1997 Toronto municipal election: Councillor, Ward Seven (two members elected)
Candidate	Votes	%
Maria Augimeri	11,243	28.01
Peter Li Preti	9,747	24.28
Maria Rizzo	8,850	22.05
Anthony Perruzza	6,347	15.81
Anna Stella	2,961	7.38
Jeanelle Julien	523	1.30
Abdulhaq Omar	467	1.16
Total valid votes	40,138	100.00

Electors could vote for two candidates.
The percentages are determined in relation to the total number of votes.

1995 Ontario general election: Downsview
Party	Candidate	Votes	%	±%	Expenditures
Liberal	Annamarie Castrilli	9,142	39.48	+4.88	$36,676.53
New Democratic	Anthony Perruzza	8,782	37.92	–18.65	$36,600.54
Progressive Conservative	Frank Ellis	4,444	19.19	+12.97	$8,755.28
Independent	Donato De Dominicis	572	2.47	–	$3,816.31
Green	Tiina Leivo	217	0.94	–	$1,046.57
Total valid votes		23,157	98.14		
Total rejected, unmarked and declined ballots		439	1.86	+0.27	
Turnout		23,596	63.90	–2.18	
Eligible voters		36,926			
Liberal gain from New Democratic		Swing		+11.77	
Source: Elections Ontario

1990 Ontario general election: Downsview
Party	Candidate	Votes	%	±%
New Democratic	Anthony Perruzza	13,440	56.58	+10.46
Liberal	Laureano Leone	8,219	34.60	–12.21
Progressive Conservative	Christopher Smith	1,477	6.22	–0.86
Libertarian	David Kenny	619	2.61	–
Total valid votes		23,755	98.41	
Total rejected, unmarked and declined ballots		383	1.59	+0.77
Turnout		24,138	66.08	+3.03
Eligible voters		36,528		
New Democratic gain from Liberal		Swing		+11.33
Source: Elections Ontario

1988 Toronto municipal election: North York Councillor, Ward Five
Candidate	Votes	%
Anthony Perruzza	5,207	50.65
Frank Crudo	1,967	19.13
Bruno Rea	1,557	15.14
John Butcher	951	9.25
Charles Olito	599	5.83
Total valid votes	10,281	100.00

46 out of 47 polls reporting.

1985 Toronto municipal election: Metro Toronto Separate School Board, Ward Fifteen
Candidate	Votes	%
Anthony Perruzza	1,999	33.80
(x)Tony Nigro	1,940	32.80
Ralph Paonessa	1,130	19.10
A. Renato Lavalle	846	14.30
Total valid votes	5,915	100.00

Toronto municipal by-election, November 12, 1984: North York Councillor, Ward One
Candidate	Votes	%
Mario Sergio	2,685	.
Ted Wray	1,139	.
Frank Esposito	.	.
Ralph Frascino	.	.
Nick Iamonico	.	.
Paul Leli	.	.
Cal Osmond	.	.
Anthony Perruzza	.	.
Mario Reda	.	.
Jack Sweet	.	.
Camilo Tiqui	.	.
