= Downsview (electoral district) =

Former provincial electoral district in Ontario, Canada

Ontario electoral district

Defunct provincial electoral district
- Legislature: Legislative Assembly of Ontario
- District created: 1963
- District abolished: 1996
- First contested: 1963
- Last contested: 1995

Demographics
- Census division: Toronto
- Census subdivision: Toronto

Downsview was a provincial riding in Ontario, Canada. It was created for the 1963 provincial election, and was retained until redistribution in 1999. Downsview was located in North York, which was previously part of Metropolitan Toronto and is now part of the city of Toronto. It was formed from part of the original riding of York Centre. In 1996 it was merged into a newly reconstituted riding of the same name.

For most of its history, Downsview was a hotly contested marginal seat between the Liberals and the New Democratic Party. Its final representative, however, was a Progressive Conservative: Annamarie Castrilli was elected as a Liberal in 1995, but crossed parties on the last sitting day of the legislature before the 1999 election.

The riding's demographics and boundaries shifted throughout its existence. In the 1960s, it consisted of the area of the borough of North York between Bathurst Street and Keele Street. During this period, the riding had a large Jewish community, representing about 40% of the population. In the 1975 election, the eastern, predominantly Jewish section of the riding was redistributed to the riding of Wilson Heights and the riding became predominantly Italian. Odoardo Di Santo, elected as a New Democrat in 1975, was one of the first three Italian-Canadians to serve in the Ontario legislature.

== Members of Provincial Parliament ==
Downsview
| Assembly | Years | Member | Party |
|---|---|---|---|
Created from part of York Centre riding in 1963
| 27th | 1963–1967 | Vern Singer | Liberal |
| 28th | 1967–1971 | Vern Singer | Liberal |
| 29th | 1971–1975 | Vern Singer | Liberal |
| 30th | 1975–1977 | Odoardo Di Santo | New Democratic |
| 31st | 1977–1981 | Odoardo Di Santo | New Democratic |
| 32nd | 1981–1985 | Odoardo Di Santo | New Democratic |
| 33rd | 1985–1987 | Joseph Cordiano | Liberal |
| 34th | 1987–1990 | Laureano Leone | Liberal |
| 35th | 1990–1995 | Anthony Perruzza | New Democratic |
| 36th | 1995–1999 | Annamarie Castrilli | Liberal |
| 36th | 1999–1999 | Annamarie Castrilli | Progressive Conservative |
Sourced from the Ontario Legislative Assembly
Merged into York Centre riding after 1999

== Electoral results ==
1995 Ontario general election
| Party | Candidate | Votes | % | ±% | Expenditures |
|---|---|---|---|---|---|
| Liberal | Annamarie Castrilli | 9,142 | 39.48 | +4.88 | $36,676.53 |
| New Democratic | Anthony Perruzza | 8,782 | 37.92 | –18.65 | $36,600.54 |
| Progressive Conservative | Frank Ellis | 4,444 | 19.19 | +12.97 | $8,755.28 |
| Independent | Donato De Dominicis | 572 | 2.47 | – | $3,816.31 |
| Green | Tiina Leivo | 217 | 0.94 | – | $1,046.57 |
| Total valid votes | | 23,157 | 98.14 | | |
| Total rejected, unmarked and declined ballots | | 439 | 1.86 | +0.27 | |
| Turnout | | 23,596 | 63.90 | –2.18 | |
| Eligible voters | | 36,926 | | | |
| Liberal gain from New Democratic | | Swing | | +11.77 | |
Source: Elections Ontario

1990 Ontario general election
| Party | Candidate | Votes | % | ±% |
|---|---|---|---|---|
| New Democratic | Anthony Perruzza | 13,440 | 56.58 | +10.46 |
| Liberal | Laureano Leone | 8,219 | 34.60 | –12.21 |
| Progressive Conservative | Christopher Smith | 1,477 | 6.22 | –0.86 |
| Libertarian | David Kenny | 619 | 2.61 | – |
| Total valid votes | | 23,755 | 98.41 | |
| Total rejected, unmarked and declined ballots | | 383 | 1.59 | +0.77 |
| Turnout | | 24,138 | 66.08 | +3.03 |
| Eligible voters | | 36,528 | | |
| New Democratic gain from Liberal | | Swing | | +11.33 |
Source: Elections Ontario

1987 Ontario general election
| Party | Candidate | Votes | % | ±% |
|---|---|---|---|---|
| Liberal | Laureano Leone | 11,832 | 46.81 | +2.88 |
| New Democratic | Maria Augimeri | 11,658 | 46.12 | +3.06 |
| Progressive Conservative | Drew McCreadie | 1,788 | 7.07 | –5.94 |
| Total valid votes | | 25,278 | 99.18 | |
| Total rejected ballots | | 209 | 0.82 | +0.17 |
| Turnout | | 25,487 | 63.05 | –2.42 |
| Eligible voters | | 40,423 | | |
| Liberal hold | | Swing | | –0.09 |
Source: Elections Ontario

1985 Ontario general election
| Party | Candidate | Votes | % | ±% |
|---|---|---|---|---|
| Liberal | Joseph Cordiano | 11,234 | 43.92 | +7.78 |
| New Democratic | Odoardo Di Santo | 11,013 | 43.06 | +3.96 |
| Progressive Conservative | Vincent Stabile | 3,329 | 13.02 | –11.75 |
| Total valid votes | | 25,576 | 99.35 | |
| Total rejected ballots | | 167 | 0.65 | +0.02 |
| Turnout | | 25,743 | 65.47 | +7.05 |
| Eligible voters | | 39,321 | | |
| Liberal gain from New Democratic | | Swing | | +1.91 |
Source: Elections Ontario

1981 Ontario general election
| Party | Candidate | Votes | % | ±% | Expenditures |
|---|---|---|---|---|---|
| New Democratic | Odoardo Di Santo | 8,644 | 39.10 | –6.00 | $14,984 |
| Liberal | Joe Volpe | 7,991 | 36.14 | +10.42 | $17,106 |
| Progressive Conservative | Ross Charles | 5,475 | 24.76 | –2.45 | $15,229 |
| Total valid votes | | 22,110 | 99.37 | | |
| Total rejected ballots | | 141 | 0.63 | –0.23 | |
| Turnout | | 22,251 | 58.42 | –6.65 | |
| Eligible voters | | 38,086 | | | |
| New Democratic hold | | Swing | | –8.21 | |
Source: Elections Ontario

1977 Ontario general election
| Party | Candidate | Votes | % | ±% |
|---|---|---|---|---|
| New Democratic | Odoardo Di Santo | 10,194 | 45.10 | +8.20 |
| Progressive Conservative | Sam Stabile | 6,152 | 27.22 | +0.70 |
| Liberal | Joe DeAngelis | 5,814 | 25.72 | –10.87 |
| Libertarian | Michael Little | 251 | 1.11 | – |
| Independent | Doreen Leitch | 193 | 0.85 | – |
| Total valid votes | | 22,604 | 99.14 | |
| Total rejected ballots | | 196 | 0.86 | +0.27 |
| Turnout | | 22,800 | 65.07 | –0.47 |
| Eligible voters | | 35,039 | | |
| New Democratic hold | | Swing | | +3.75 |
Source: Elections Ontario

1975 Ontario general election
| Party | Candidate | Votes | % | ±% |
|---|---|---|---|---|
| New Democratic | Odoardo Di Santo | 8,091 | 36.90 | +3.60 |
| Liberal | Michelangelo Spensieri | 8,023 | 36.59 | –15.67 |
| Progressive Conservative | Barbara Greene | 5,814 | 26.51 | +12.06 |
| Total valid votes | | 21,928 | 99.41 | |
| Total rejected ballots | | 130 | 0.59 | –0.40 |
| Turnout | | 22,058 | 65.54 | –2.88 |
| Eligible voters | | 33,656 | | |
| New Democratic gain from Liberal | | Swing | | +9.63 |
Source: Elections Ontario

1971 Ontario general election
| Party | Candidate | Votes | % | ±% |
|---|---|---|---|---|
| Liberal | Vernon Singer | 17,140 | 52.25 | +15.70 |
| New Democratic | Murray Chusid | 10,921 | 33.29 | –3.17 |
| Progressive Conservative | Lorraine Deane | 4,740 | 14.45 | –11.45 |
| Total valid votes | | 32,801 | 99.01 | |
| Total rejected ballots | | 328 | 0.99 | –0.69 |
| Turnout | | 33,129 | 68.42 | +9.53 |
| Eligible voters | | 48,419 | | |
| Liberal hold | | Swing | | +9.44 |
Source: Elections Ontario

1967 Ontario general election
| Party | Candidate | Votes | % | ±% |
|---|---|---|---|---|
| Liberal | Vernon Singer | 8,876 | 36.56 | –1.57 |
| New Democratic | Murray Chusid | 8,855 | 36.47 | +1.09 |
| Progressive Conservative | Max H. Sheeter | 6,290 | 25.91 | –0.59 |
| Independent | Sonnee Cohen | 260 | 1.07 | – |
| Total valid votes | | 24,281 | 98.32 | |
| Total rejected ballots | | 415 | 1.68 | –0.13 |
| Turnout | | 24,696 | 58.90 | +7.88 |
| Eligible voters | | 41,932 | | |
| Liberal hold | | Swing | | –1.33 |
Source: Elections Ontario

1963 Ontario general election
| Party | Candidate | Votes | % | ±% |
|---|---|---|---|---|
| Liberal | Vernon Singer | 7,335 | 38.13 | – |
| New Democratic | Alan Borovoy | 6,807 | 35.38 | – |
| Progressive Conservative | David Vanek | 5,097 | 26.49 | – |
| Total valid votes | | 19,239 | 98.19 | |
| Total rejected ballots | | 354 | 1.81 | – |
| Turnout | | 19,593 | 51.02 | – |
| Eligible voters | | 38,406 | | |
| Liberal pickup new district. | | | | |
Source: Elections Ontario

== See also ==
- List of Ontario provincial electoral districts
- Canadian provincial electoral districts
