= Rocca Pia =

- Comune
- Comune di Rocca Pia
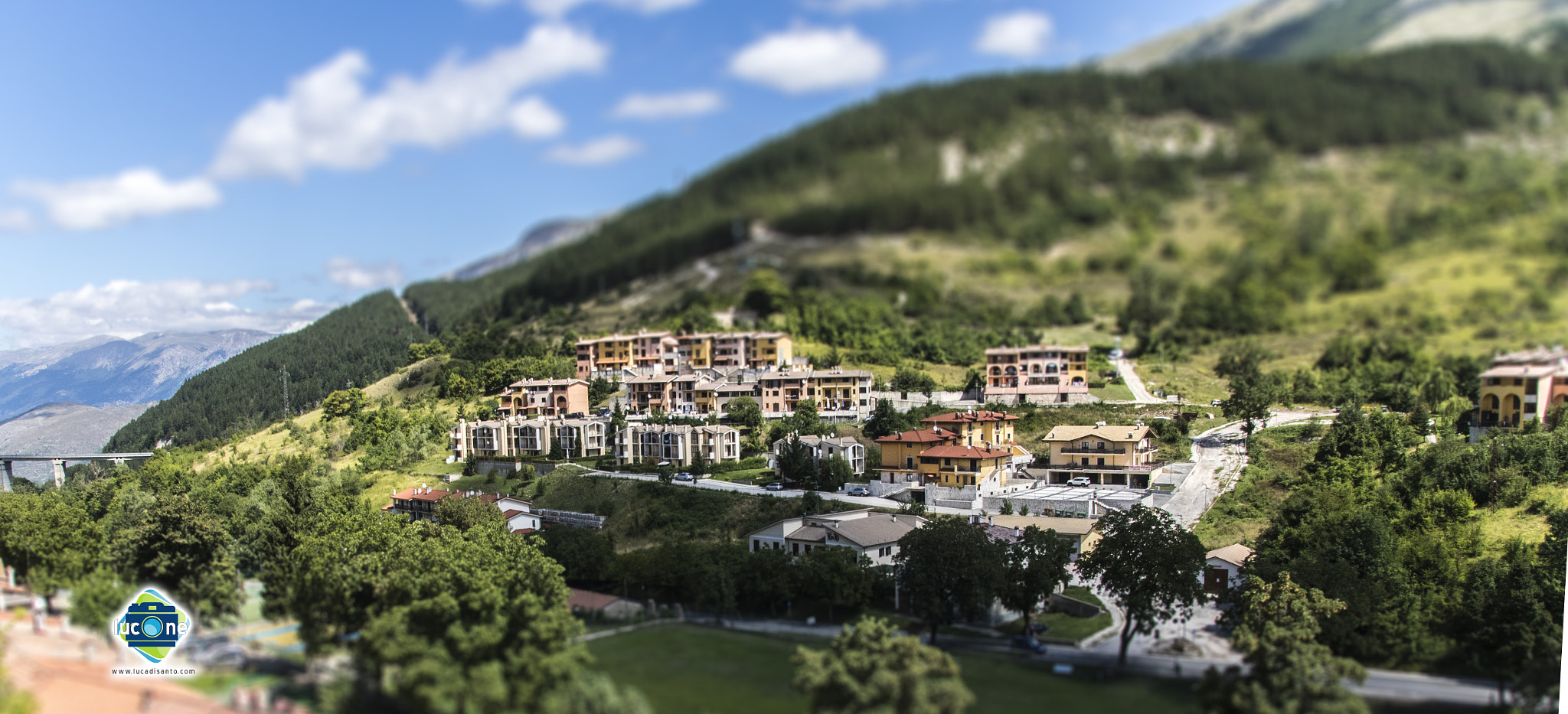

- Location within Italy Location within Abruzzo
- Coordinates: 41°56′4″N 13°58′40″E
- Country: Italy
- Region: Abruzzo
- Province: L'Aquila (AQ)
- Frazioni: Pescocostanzo, Pettorano sul Gizio, Rivisondoli, Scanno

Government
  - Mayor: Mauro Leone

Area
  - Total: 44.96 km^{2} (17.36 sq mi)
- Elevation: 1,050 m (3,440 ft)

Population (31 March 2017)
  - Total: 171
  - Density: 3.80/km^{2} (9.85/sq mi)
- Demonym: Roccolani
- Time zone: UTC+1 (CET)
  - Summer (DST): UTC+2 (CEST)
- Postal code: 67030
- Dialing code: 0864
- ISTAT code: 066083
- Saint day: 19 March
- Website: Official website

Rocca Pia is a comune and town in the Province of L'Aquila in the Abruzzo region of Italy. Its territory extended up to the level of the Cinquemiglia Plain.
