= Humber River—Black Creek (federal electoral district) =

Federal electoral district in Ontario, Canada

Coordinates: 43.7569°N 79.5267°W

Ontario electoral district
- Interactive map of riding boundaries from the 2004 federal election

Federal electoral district
- Legislature: House of Commons
MP
Judy Sgro
Liberal
- District created: 2015
- First contested: 2015
- Last contested: 2025
- District webpage: profile, map

Demographics
- Population (2021): 111,593
- Electors (2021): 66,067
- Area (km²): 30.61
- Pop. density (per km²): 3,645.6
- Census division: Toronto
- Census subdivision: Toronto

Humber River—Black Creek is a federal electoral district in Toronto, Ontario, Canada, that has been represented in the House of Commons of Canada from 2015. Prior to the 2015 election, the riding was known as York West. The former name reflects the riding is in the former Township of York which is within the City of Toronto.

As per the 2016 Census, Humber River—Black Creek is the City of Toronto riding with the highest percentage of people belonging to the Latin American (9.5%) and Southeast Asian (8.9%) communities. It is also the City of Toronto riding with the highest percentage of people of Jamaican (8.5%) and Vietnamese (8.0%) ethnic origins. At the same time, it is one of only two (2) City of Toronto ridings (besides Etobicoke Centre), where Italian is the largest ethnic community (12.8%).

== Geography ==
The district includes the northwest corner of the former city of North York. It includes the neighbourhoods of Humber Summit, Humbermede, Humberlea, York University Heights, Jane and Finch and the extreme western part of Downsview.

It consists of the part of the City of Toronto bounded on the north by the northern city limit, and on the east, south and west by a line drawn from the city limit south along Keele Street, west along Grandravine Drive, southeast along Black Creek, west along Sheppard Avenue West, south along Jane Street, west along Highway 401, and northwest along the Humber River to the northern city limit.

== Demographics ==
According to the 2021 Canadian census

Languages: 44.3% English, 7% Spanish, 6.1% Vietnamese, 5.8% Italian, 3.9% Tagalog, 2.1% Urdu, 1.8% Punjabi, 1.6% Yue, 1.4% Tamil, 1.2% Portuguese, 1.1% Assyrian Neo-Aramaic, 1.1% Gujarati
Religions: 58.9% Christian (32.6% Catholic, 3.4% Pentecostal, 1.7% Christian Orthodox, 1% Anglican), 15.2% No religion, 10.5% Muslim, 7.1% Hindu, 6.1% Buddhist, 1.7% Sikh
Median income (2020): $31,400
Average income (2020): $37,240

Ethnic origins: Italian 10.2%, Vietnamese 8.1%, Filipino: 7.3%, Indian 5.9%, Jamaican 5.3%, Canadian 5.2%, African 4.6%, Chinese 4%, Guyanese 2.5%, Pakistani 2.3%

Panethnic groups in Humber River—Black Creek (2011−2021)
Panethnic group	2021		2016		2011	
Panethnic group	Pop.	%	Pop.	%	Pop.	%
African	27,375	24.62%	24,565	22.8%	24,110	22.43%
European (Note: Statistic includes all persons that did not make up part of a visible minority or an indigenous identity.)	23,735	21.34%	27,345	25.38%	29,575	27.51%
Southeast Asian (Note: Statistic includes total responses of "Filipino" and "Southeast Asian" under visible minority section on census.)	20,195	18.16%	15,515	14.4%	12,360	11.5%
South Asian	15,295	13.75%	15,285	14.19%	17,200	16%
Latin American	9,975	8.97%	10,245	9.51%	9,815	9.13%
Middle Eastern (Note: Statistic includes total responses of "West Asian" and "Arab" under visible minority section on census.)	3,710	3.34%	3,515	3.26%	3,995	3.72%
East Asian (Note: Statistic includes total responses of "Chinese", "Korean", and "Japanese" under visible minority section on census.)	3,320	2.99%	4,285	3.98%	4,515	4.2%
Indigenous	500	0.45%	605	0.56%	295	0.27%
Other/multiracial (Note: Statistic includes total responses of "Visible minority, n.i.e." and "Multiple visible minorities" under visible minority section on census.)	7,100	6.38%	6,365	5.91%	5,630	5.24%
Total responses	111,200	99.65%	107,725	99.71%	107,490	99.35%
Total population	111,593	100%	108,037	100%	108,198	100%
Notes: Totals greater than 100% due to multiple origin responses. Demographics based on 2012 Canadian federal electoral redistribution riding boundaries.

== History ==
Humber River—Black Creek's former name York West was one of the oldest electoral district names in the country. York West was one of the original electoral districts at Canadian Confederation prescribed in the British North America Act, and it traced its origin even further, all the way to Upper Canada. While there was indeed a Member of Parliament for York West in each parliament from 1867 to 1904 and again from 1917 to 2015, the electoral districts represented by the MPs before the 1970s had little connection to this electoral district beyond the former name. York West as a federal electoral district was entirely situation in Etobicoke from 1935 to 1968. Therefore, the MPs that represented York West during that era did not represent the communities that are in present day Humber River—Black Creek at all.

The York West federal electoral district had been situated in the general area of Humber River—Black Creek since 1979. Three MPs for York West, all former Liberal cabinet ministers, have been substantially represented the communities of Humber River—Black Creek: James Fleming, Sergio Marchi, and current MP Judy Sgro, who has been representing this electoral district since 1999.

The electoral boundaries of York West were last changed by Representaton Order 2003, which took effect at the 2004 federal election. The same boundaries had been maintained by Humber River—Black Creek since then.

== Members of Parliament ==
This riding has elected the following members of Parliament:

Parliament	Years	Member	Party
York West
28th	1968–1972	Philip Givens	Liberal
29th	1972–1974	James Fleming	Liberal
30th	1974–1979	James Fleming	Liberal
31st	1979–1980	James Fleming	Liberal
32nd	1980–1984	James Fleming	Liberal
33rd	1984–1988	Sergio Marchi	Liberal
34th	1988–1993	Sergio Marchi	Liberal
35th	1993–1997	Sergio Marchi	Liberal
36th	1997–1999	Sergio Marchi	Liberal
36th	1999–2000	Judy Sgro	Liberal
37th	2000–2004	Judy Sgro	Liberal
38th	2004–2006	Judy Sgro	Liberal
39th	2006–2008	Judy Sgro	Liberal
40th	2008–2011	Judy Sgro	Liberal
41st	2011–2015	Judy Sgro	Liberal
Humber River—Black Creek
42nd	2015–2019	Judy Sgro	Liberal
43rd	2019–2021	Judy Sgro	Liberal
44th	2021–2025	Judy Sgro	Liberal
45th	2025–present	Judy Sgro	Liberal

=== Current member of Parliament ===
The riding is represented by Judy Sgro in the House of Commons of Canada.

== Former boundaries ==
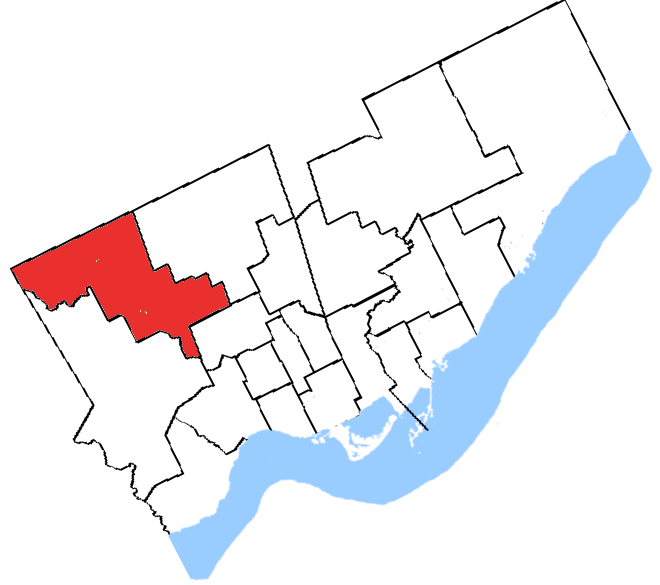
1966 to 1976

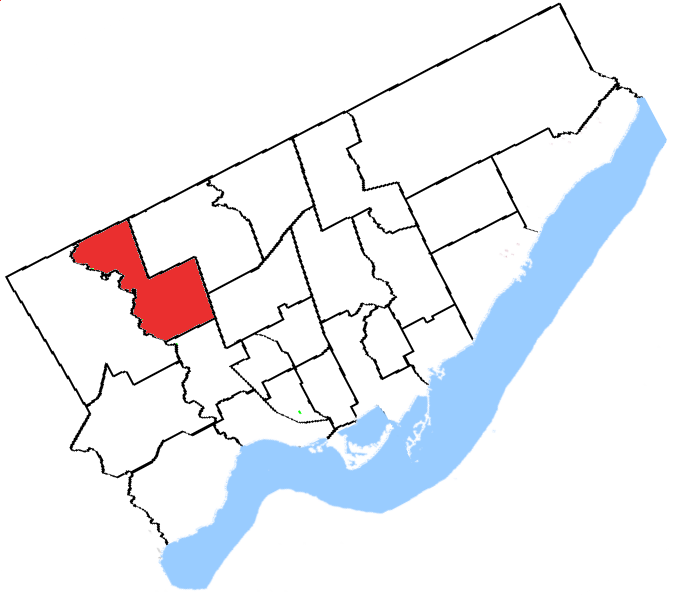
1976 to 1987

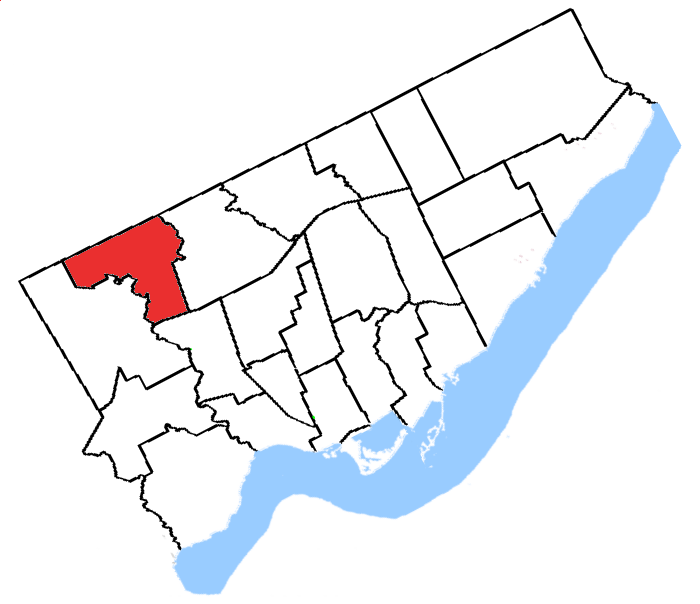
1987 to 1996

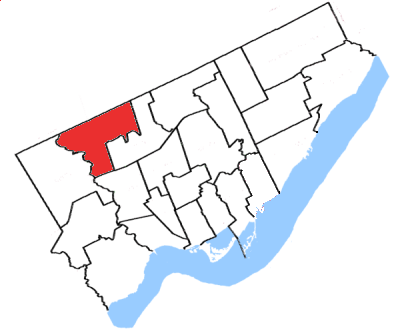
1996 to 2003

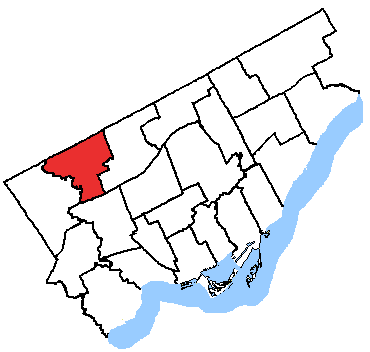
2003 to 2015

== Election results ==
=== Humber River—Black Creek, 2015-present ===
2025 Canadian federal election
Party	Candidate	Votes	%	±%	Expenditures
Liberal	Judy Sgro	21,357	55.6	–5.15	
Conservative	Bijay Paudel	13,745	35.8	+18.49	
New Democratic	Matias de Dovitiis	2,449	6.4	–10.02	
People's	Marek Jasinski	621	1.6	–2.31	
Communist	Jeanne McGuire	226	0.6	N/A	
Total valid votes/expense limit		38,398	98.7	+0.4	
Total rejected ballots		507	1.3	-0.4	
Turnout		38,905	56.1	+7.2	
Eligible voters		69,316			
Liberal hold		Swing		–11.82	
Source: Elections Canada

2021 Canadian federal election
Party	Candidate	Votes	%	±%	Expenditures
Liberal	Judy Sgro	19,533	60.69	-0.40	$54,150.61
Conservative	Rinku Shah	5,599	17.40	+1.16	none listed
New Democratic	Matias De Dovitiis	5,279	16.40	-2.56	$36,826.81
People's	Raatib Anderson	1,258	3.91	+2.85	$6,216.88
Green	Unblind Tibbin	388	1.21	-0.91	$0.00
Marxist–Leninist	Christine Nugent	130	0.40	+0.17	$0.00
Total valid votes/expense limit		32,187	98.28	–	$104,982.06
Total rejected ballots		562	1.72	–	
Turnout		32,749	48.93	-7.92	
Eligible voters		66,934			
Liberal hold		Swing		-0.78	
Source: Elections Canada

2019 Canadian federal election
Party	Candidate	Votes	%	±%	Expenditures
Liberal	Judy Sgro	23,187	61.1	-5.81	$93,410.00
New Democratic	Maria Augimeri	7,198	19.0	+8.06	$18,120.64
Conservative	Iftikhar Choudry	6,164	16.3	-3.96	$3,300.00
Green	Mike Schmitz	804	2.1	+0.47	none listed
People's	Ania Krosinska	402	1.1	–	none listed
United	Stenneth Smith	114	0.3	-	$0.00
Marxist–Leninist	Christine Nugent	89	0.2	-0.36	$0.00
Total valid votes/expense limit		37,958	100.0		
Total rejected ballots		503			
Turnout		38,461	56.8		
Eligible voters		67,656			
Liberal hold		Swing		-6.94	
Source: Elections Canada

2015 Canadian federal election
Party	Candidate	Votes	%	±%	Expenditures
Liberal	Judy Sgro	23,995	66.91	+19.92	$81,660.40
Conservative	Kerry Vandenberg	7,228	20.16	-1.93	$60,649.16
New Democratic	Darnel Harris	3,851	10.74	-17.11	$3,291.83
Green	Keith Jarrett	584	1.63	+0.01	–
Marxist–Leninist	Christine Nugent	201	0.56	–	–
Total valid votes/expense limit		35,859	100.00		$196,402.78
Total rejected ballots		333	0.92	–	
Turnout		36,192	59.34	–	
Eligible voters		60,994			
Liberal hold		Swing		+10.92	
Source: Elections Canada

=== York West, 1917–2015 ===
2011 Canadian federal election: York West
Party	Candidate	Votes	%	±%	Expenditures
Liberal	Judy Sgro	13,030	47.0	-12.4	
New Democratic	Giulio Manfrini	7,721	27.8	+9.1	
Conservative	Audrey Walters	6,122	22.1	+5.4	
Green	Unblind Tibben	450	1.6	-3.6	
Christian Heritage	George Okoth Otura	231	0.8	–	
Canadian Action	Arthur Smitherman	170	0.6	–	
Total valid votes/expense limit		27,724	100.0		
Total rejected ballots		267	1.0	+0.2	
Turnout		27,991	48.2	-0.1	
Eligible voters		57,287	–	–	

2008 Canadian federal election: York West
Party	Candidate	Votes	%	±%	Expenditures
Liberal	Judy Sgro	16,997	59.4	-4.4	$35,514
New Democratic	Giulio Manfrini	5,363	18.7	+4.6	$12,354
Conservative	Kevin Nguyen	4,773	16.7	-1.9	$12,960
Green	Nick Capra	1,488	5.2	+2.2	$1,557
Total valid votes/expense limit		28,621	100.0	$77,457	
Total rejected ballots		219	0.8		
Turnout		28,840	48.3		

2006 Canadian federal election: York West
Party	Candidate	Votes	%	Expenditures
Liberal	Judy Sgro	21,418	63.78	$48,741.93
Conservative	Parm Gill	6,244	18.59	$71,005.65
New Democratic	Sandra Romano Anthony	4,724	14.07	$8,845.73
Green	Nick Capra	1,002	2.98	$1,692.18
Independent	Axcel Cocon	192	0.57	$1,801.61
Total valid votes		33,580	100.00	
Total rejected ballots		261		
Turnout		33,841	57.90	
Electors on the lists		58,450		

2004 Canadian federal election: York West
Party	Candidate	Votes	%	±%
Liberal	Judy Sgro	17,903	64.7	-12.6
New Democratic	Sandra Romano Anthony	4,228	15.2	+6.0
Conservative	Leslie Soobrian	3,120	11.2	+0.5
Christian Heritage	Joseph Grubb	1,580	5.7	
Green	Tim McKellar	824	3.0	
Total valid votes		27,655	100.0	

Note: Conservative vote is compared to the total of the Canadian Alliance vote and Progressive Conservative vote in 2000 election.

2000 Canadian federal election: York West
Party	Candidate	Votes	%	±%
Liberal	Judy Sgro	19,737	77.3	+3.1
Alliance	Munish Chandra	2,724	10.7	+7.9
New Democratic	Julia McCrea	2,361	9.2	+1.5
Marijuana	G. Marcello Marchetti	537	2.1	
Marxist–Leninist	Amarjit Dhillon	175	0.7	
Total valid votes		25,534	100.0	

Note: Canadian Alliance vote is compared to the Reform vote in 1997 election.

Canadian federal by-election, November 15, 1999: York West
Party	Candidate	Votes	%	±%
Liberal	Judy Sgro	10,034	74.2	+0.5
Progressive Conservative	Elio Di Iorio	1,721	12.7	+5.2
New Democratic	Julia McCrea	1,054	7.8	-2.1
Reform	Enzo Granzotto	377	2.8	-6.2
Canadian Action	Stephen Burega	242	1.8	
Green	Henry Zeifman	101	0.7	
Total valid votes		13,529	100.0	
Liberal hold		Swing		+1.3
By-election due to the appointment of Sergio Marchi as Canadian Ambassador to the World Trade Organization

1997 Canadian federal election: York West
Party	Candidate	Votes	%	±%
Liberal	Sergio Marchi	21,254	73.6	-6.2
New Democratic	Lombe Chinkangala	2,853	9.9	+6.5
Reform	Ken Freeman	2,598	9.0	-1.7
Progressive Conservative	Richard Donovan	2,165	7.5	+2.8
Total valid votes		28,870	100.0	

1993 Canadian federal election: York West
Party	Candidate	Votes	%	±%
Liberal	Sergio Marchi	25,356	79.8	+20.2
Reform	Bruce A. Castleman	3,385	10.7	-8.4
Progressive Conservative	Marguerite Bebluk	1,506	4.7	-14.3
New Democratic	Rosanne Giulietti	1,074	3.4	-14.8
Natural Law	Claudio Paolini	209	0.7	
Marxist–Leninist	Jean-Paul Bédard	164	0.5	
Abolitionist	Ljiljana Medjedovic	82	0.3	
Total valid votes		31,776	100.0	

1988 Canadian federal election: York West
Party	Candidate	Votes	%	±%
Liberal	Sergio Marchi	19,936	59.6	+15.0
Progressive Conservative	Elizabeth Smith	6,368	19.1	-11.8
New Democratic	Alice Lambrinos	6,088	18.2	-3.8
Libertarian	Roma Kelembet	498	1.5	+0.7
Independent	Sherland R. Chhangur	270	0.8	
Independent	Gary Robert Walsh	145	0.4	
Communist	Jack C. Sweet	119	0.4	0.0
Total valid votes		33,424	100.0	

1984 Canadian federal election: York West
Party	Candidate	Votes	%	±%
Liberal	Sergio Marchi	17,629	44.6	-12.2
Progressive Conservative	Frank Di Giorgio	12,218	30.9	+12.0
New Democratic	Bruno Pasquantonio	8,718	22.0	-1.5
Libertarian	Dusan Kubias	335	0.8	+0.3
Independent	Anna Esposito	279	0.7	
Green	Jutta I. Keylwerth	238	0.6	
Communist	Jack C. Sweet	147	0.4	+0.3
Total valid votes		39,564	100.0	

1980 Canadian federal election: York West
Party	Candidate	Votes	%	±%
Liberal	James Fleming	21,385	56.8	+9.7
New Democratic	Elio Costa	8,884	23.6	-3.4
Progressive Conservative	Don Cleveland	7,101	18.8	-6.0
Libertarian	Scott Hughes	194	0.5	-0.1
Communist	Nan McDonald	85	0.2	-0.2
Marxist–Leninist	Dagmar M. Rappold	29	0.1	-0.1
Total valid votes		37,678	100.0	
lop.parl.ca

1979 Canadian federal election: York West
Party	Candidate	Votes	%	±%
Liberal	James Fleming	18,410	47.0	-5.9
Progressive Conservative	Robert Michener	10,572	27.0	+1.1
New Democratic	Elio Costa	9,712	24.8	+5.7
Libertarian	Dan A. Kornitzer	246	0.6	
Communist	Gordon Flowers	151	0.4	+0.1
Marxist–Leninist	Dagmar M. Rappold	54	0.1	0.0
Total valid votes		39,145	100.0	

1974 Canadian federal election: York West
Party	Candidate	Votes	%	±%
Liberal	James Fleming	28,075	52.9	+13.4
Progressive Conservative	John Hanna	13,734	25.9	-0.7
New Democratic	Freda Hawkins	10,139	19.1	-13.9
Independent	Jim Laxer^{1}	674	1.3	
Independent	Thomas Frazer	215	0.4	
Communist	George Harris	134	0.3	
Marxist–Leninist	Christine A. Nugent	71	0.1	
Total valid votes		53,042	100.0	
Source: lop.parl.ca^{1} Movement for an Independent Socialist Canada

1972 Canadian federal election: York West
Party	Candidate	Votes	%	±%
Liberal	James Fleming	22,270	39.5	-5.3
New Democratic	Val Scott	18,639	33.1	-2.5
Progressive Conservative	Clem Nusca	14,997	26.6	+8.3
Social Credit	David Horwood	237	0.4	
Independent	John Bizzell	167	0.3	
Independent	Sean Daly	84	0.1	
Total valid votes		56,394	100.0	

1968 Canadian federal election: York West
Party	Candidate	Votes	%	±%
Liberal	Philip Givens	20,416	44.8	-2.9
New Democratic	Val Scott	16,204	35.6	+12.7
Progressive Conservative	Wes Boddington	8,344	18.3	-11.2
Independent	Norman Gunn	442	1.0	
Communist	William Kashtan	155	0.3	
Total valid votes		45,561	100.0	

For results of York West prior to 1968, see York West (electoral district).

== See also ==
- List of Canadian electoral districts
- Historical federal electoral districts of Canada
