= List of members of the Order of Ontario =

The following is a full list of members of the Order of Ontario, both past and current, in order of their date of appointment.

== Members ==
=== 1987 ===
- John Black Aird – 23rd Lieutenant Governor of Ontario
- Aline Akeson – poverty activist
- J. M. S. Careless – historian
- Hon. William G. Davis – Premier of Ontario (1971–1985)
- Celia Franca – founder of National Ballet of Canada
- Harry Gairey – civil rights activist
- Duncan Gordon
- Roger Guindon – university administrator
- Dianne Harkin – founder of Women for the Survival of Agriculture
- Cleeve Horne – portrait painter and sculptor
- Benjamin Sinclair Johnson – sprinter
- Franc Joubin – prospector and geologist
- Johnny Lombardi – pioneer of multicultural broadcasting in Canada
- Clifford McIntosh – public speaker, author and founder of the Quetico Centre
- Oskar Morawetz – composer
- John Polanyi – Nobel laureate
- Al Purdy – poet
- James Swail – researcher and developer of assistive devices for the blind
- Bessie Touzel – social worker and teacher
- Whipper Billy Watson – professional wrestler, supporter of children's charities

=== 1988 ===
- Alex Baumann – competitive swimmer, Olympic medalist
- June Callwood – journalist, author and social activist
- Floyd Chalmers – editor, publisher and philanthropist
- Robertson Davies – novelist, playwright, critic, journalist, professor, founding Master of Massey College
- Reva Gerstein – first woman Chancellor of the University of Western Ontario (1992–96)
- Charlotte Lemieux – teacher and public servant
- Walter Frederick Light – business executive
- Gordon Lightfoot – singer and songwriter
- Dennis McDermott – trade unionist, Canadian Director of the United Auto Workers (1968–78), and president of the Canadian Labour Congress (1978–86)
- Pauline McGibbon – 22nd Lieutenant Governor of Ontario
- Don Moore – activist and immigration advocate
- Bernice Noblitt – President of the Federated Women's Institute of Canada, women's rights activist and teacher
- John C. Parkin – architect
- Beryl Potter – activist for the rights of people with disabilities
- John Josiah Robinette – lawyer
- Murray Ross – founding president of York University
- Robert B. Salter – Orthopedic surgeon and professor
- John Weinzweig – composer

=== 1989 ===
- Louis Applebaum – composer
- John W. H. Bassett – publisher, media baron
- Dorothy Beam – advocate for the rights of the Deaf
- Leonard Birchall – decorated RCAF pilot (World War II)
- Violet Blackman – black rights activist
- Morley Callaghan – author & playwright
- Paul Charbonneau – priest and founder of Brentwood Recovery Home
- Charles George Drake – neurosurgeon
- Anne Gribben – nurse and labour activist
- James Ham – engineer, administrator and President of the University of Toronto
- Kenneth Hare – climatologist
- Daniel Iannuzzi – broadcaster
- Norman Jewison – film director, producer, actor and founder of the Canadian Film Centre
- Basil Johnston – Anishinaabe writer & storyteller
- Cliff Lumsdon – world champion marathon swimmer
- Janet Murray – nun, educator and hospital administrator
- Laure Rièse – educator; first female faculty member to obtain a PhD from University of Toronto
- Harry Thode – geochemist, nuclear chemist, and academic administrator
- Eberhard Zeidler – architect

=== 1990 ===
- James Archibald – veterinary surgeon, organ transplant pioneer
- Margaret Atwood – writer
- John Bailey – physician and community organizer
- Maxwell Enkin – refugee advocate
- Maureen Forrester – contralto
- Ursula Franklin – metallurgist, research physicist, author and educator
- George R. Gardiner – businessman, philanthropist and co-founder of the Gardiner Museum
- Stanley Grizzle – trade union activist
- Karen Kain – dancer
- Vicki Keith – marathon swimmer
- Wilbert Keon – heart surgeon, scientific researcher
- Dr. Robert McClure – surgeon, missionary, Moderator of the United Church of Canada (1968–71), social activist
- Roland Michener – 20th Governor General of Canada
- Roderick Moran – paediatric dentist and organizer of specialized care clinics for disabled children
- Brian Orser – figure skater (Olympic medallist/world champion)
- Clifford Pilkey – trade union leader
- Wilfrid Sarazin
- Herbert Smith – engineer and educator
- Kathleen Taylor – the first woman to chair the board of a major Canadian bank
- Jean Woodsworth – social worker, women's and seniors' rights activist

=== 1991 ===
- Gerald Barbeau
- John Basmajian – scientist
- Elisabeth Bednar
- Agnes Benidickson – first female chancellor of Queen's University
- Liona Boyd – classical guitarist
- Clara Bernhardt – writer, poet and composer
- A. J. Casson – artist, member of the Group of Seven
- Clifford Chadderton – veteran (World War II), CEO of The War Amps
- Frances Dafoe – figure skater, World Champion and Olympic medallist
- Dora de Pedery-Hunt – artist, designer of coins for Royal Canadian Mint
- John Craig Eaton – businessman
- John Robert Evans – pediatrician, academic, businessperson, civic leader, founding dean of McMaster University Faculty of Medicine
- Timothy Findley – author & playwright
- Mary Lou Fox
- Wilbur Howard – minister, the first black person to graduate from Emmanuel College and be ordained in the United Church of Canada
- William Goldwin Carrington Howland – lawyer, judge and former Chief Justice of Ontario
- Greta Kraus – Harpsichordist, pianist and teacher
- Sim Fai Liu – doctor and founder of the Mon Sheong Foundation
- Veronica O'Reilly
- Tom Patterson – founder of Stratford Festival of Canada
- Walter Pitman – president of Ryerson Polytechnical Institute (1975–80)
- Annabel Slaight – teacher, environmentalist and co-founder of OWL
- Arthur Solomon
- Louis Temporale – sculptor
- George Rutherford Walker
- Lois Miriam Wilson – first female Moderator of the United Church of Canada (1980–82)

=== 1992 ===
- Lincoln Alexander – 24th Lieutenant Governor of Ontario
- Bromley Armstrong – civil rights leader
- Boris Berlin – pianist, music educator, arranger, and composer
- Pierre Berton – author, journalist, TV personality
- Suzanne Rochon-Burnett – first aboriginal person in Canada to own and operate a private commercial radio station
- Linda Crabtree – writer, advocate and founder of CMT International
- Stefan Dupré – economist, teacher and administrator
- William Hutt – actor
- Germain Lemieux – folklorist and teacher
- Arthur Martin – justice of the Court of Appeal for Ontario
- Doris McCarthy – artist
- Terry Meagher – human rights and labour activist
- Raymond Moriyama – architect
- Fraser Mustard – physician and scientist
- Oscar Peterson – jazz pianist
- Serafina Petrone – writer, educator and philanthropist
- Nancy Pocock – activist, advocate for refugees and artist
- Harry Rasky – documentary film producer
- Judith Simser – teacher and advocate for the deaf
- Rose Wolfe – Chancellor of the University of Toronto (1991–1997)

=== 1993 ===
- Roberta Bondar – astronaut
- Pat Capponi – author and advocate for mental health issues and poverty issues
- Jean-Gabriel Castel – law professor and Professor Emeritus at Osgoode Hall Law School
- Tirone David – cardiac surgeon
- Colin diCenzo
- Budhendra Doobay – cardiologist, heart surgeon and philanthropist
- Grace Hartman – first female mayor of Sudbury
- Daniel G. Hill – civil servant, human rights specialist, and Black Canadian historian
- Thomas Hill – curator, writer, art historian, artist, actor, producer and traditional eskanye singer
- Karl Kaiser – wine maker and ice wine pioneer
- Murray Koffler – businessman and philanthropist
- Benjamin Lu – chemical engineering professor and Professor Emeritus at University of Ottawa
- Abbyann Lynch – teacher and ethics consultant
- Lois Marshall – concert soprano
- Isabel McLaughlin – artist
- Gunther Plaut – author
- Paul Rekai – doctor and co-founder of Central Hospital
- Mary Stuart – administrator and volunteer
- William Tamblyn – engineer, administrator and first President of Lakehead University
- Shirley Van Hoof
- Donald J.P. Ziraldo – wine maker and ice wine pioneer

=== 1994 ===
- Prasanta Basu – ophthalmologist, researcher and director of the Eye Bank of Canada (1955-1991)
- Joan Chalmers – philanthropist
- Martin Connell – businessman and philanthropist
- Elsie Cressman – missionary and midwife
- Lorna deBlicquy – aviator and Canada's first woman Civil Aviation Flight Inspector
- Selma Edelstone
- Nicholas Goldschmidt – conductor, first music director of the Royal Conservatory Opera School (University of Toronto)
- Martha Henry – actress
- Conrad Lavigne – media executive
- Donald C. MacDonald – politician
- Flora MacDonald – politician
- Edwin Mirvish – businessman, philanthropist and theatrical impresario
- Alice Munro – writer
- Phil Nimmons – jazz clarinetist, composer, bandleader
- Ted Nolan – hockey player and coach
- George Pedersen – president of University of Western Ontario (1985 to 1994)
- Ronald Satok – artist
- Nelles Silverthorne – pediatrician, researcher and vaccine pioneer
- Elizabeth Thorn
- Bryan Walls – dental surgeon, historian and author

=== 1995 ===
- Doris Anderson – author, journalist, women's rights activist
- Tim Armstrong – public policy advisor, legal counsel and author
- Harry Arthurs – lawyer, academic, labour law scholar
- Douglas Bassett – media executive
- Thomas Beck – entrepreneur and philanthropist
- Laurent Belanger – entrepreneur and administrator
- Marlene Castellano – teacher and researcher
- Shirley Carr – labour leader, first woman president the Canadian Labour Congress.
- Angela Coughlan – internationally ranked competitive swimmer, Olympic medallist
- Corinne Devlin – gynecologist and teacher
- Robert Filler – surgeon and researcher
- Ted Hargreaves – businessman and charitable fundraiser
- Elmer Iseler – conductor of the Toronto Mendelssohn Choir, founder of the Festival Singers of Canada and the Elmer Iseler Singers
- Heather Johnston – first lay woman president of the Canadian Council of Churches
- Vim Kochhar – former senator and co-founder of Rotary Cheshire Homes
- Linda Lundström – fashion designer
- Lloyd Perry – lawyer
- Natavarlal Shah – physician, co-founder of the Sikh Education Research Centre and co-founder of the Mount Carmel Home
- William Somerville – public servant and administrator

=== 1996 ===
- Avie Bennett – businessman and philanthropist
- Huguette Burroughs – journalist and public servant
- Herbert Carnegie – hockey player
- Jesse Davidson & John Davidson – co-founders of the charity Jesse's Journey
- Clifford R. Evans – labour leader
- Gregory Evans – judge
- Ellen Louks Fairclough – first female member of the Canadian federal Cabinet
- Amber Foulkes
- Charles Godfrey – physician, professor and former MPP
- Kamala-Jean Gopie – political activist
- Chris Hadfield – astronaut
- Tommy Hunter – country singer
- Arlette Lefebvre – child psychologist at the Hospital for Sick Children
- Jeffrey Wan-shu Lo
- Janet Lunn – children's writer
- Trisha Romance – artist
- Etienne Saint-Aubin – lawyer
- Ezra Schabas – musician, educator and author
- Al Waxman – actor
- William Wilkinson
- Doreen Wicks – humanitarian

=== 1997 ===
- John Brooks – founder of the John Brooks Community Foundation and Scholarship Fund
- François Chamberland
- Audrey Cole – activist for people with disabilities
- John Colicos – actor
- William Coyle – aerospace pioneer
- Leslie Dan – businessman
- Michael de Pencier – entrepreneur, environmental investor and publisher
- Jack Diamond – architect, founding director of the Master of Architecture program at the University of Toronto
- Charles Dubin – judge
- Ralph Ellis – filmmaker, documentarian and administrator
- Larry Grossman – politician
- Elizabeth Bradford Holbrook – portrait sculptor
- Abbyann Lynch – medical ethicist
- Ron Ianni – lawyer, teacher and President of the University of Windsor
- Roy Laine
- Moon Lum
- Kathleen Mann – teacher and choir director
- Judith Meeks
- Nancy Raeburn
- Jack Rabinovitch – philanthropist and founder of the Giller Prize
- Richard Rohmer – writer
- Bob Rumball – pastor and advocate for the deaf and those with special needs
- Nalini Stewart – administrator
- Paul Tsai

=== 1998 ===
- Marion Anderson – Aboriginal band councillor
- Bluma Appel – philanthropist, arts patron
- Jean Ashworth Bartle – Founder and director of the Toronto Children's Chorus
- Allan Leslie Beattie – lawyer, former chairman of the board for the Hospital for Sick Children
- Irene Broadfoot – community activist
- Norman Campbell – television director & producer, playwright
- Armando Felice DeLuca – community activist
- Claire O. Dimock – community activist
- Ydessa Hendeles – Founder, director and curator of the Ydessa Hendeles Art Foundation and Grand Founder of the Art Gallery of Ontario (AGO)
- Dr. Kenneth C. Hobbs – physician, international humanitarian
- Hal Jackman – business leader, philanthropist, 24th Lieutenant Governor of Ontario, Chair of the Ontario Arts Council and Chancellor of the University of Toronto
- Maureen Kempston Darkes – President and General Manager of General Motors Canada Ltd. and community activist
- Marvelle Koffler – Founder of the Marvelle Koffler Breast Centre at Mount Sinai Hospital and the Koffler Centre for the Arts
- Dr. Lap Cheung Lee – community activist
- Andrée Lortie – advocate for the Francophone community
- Knowlton Nash – journalist
- Alfred U. Oakie – pioneer in traffic safety
- Lloyd Seivright – activist
- Masami Tsuruoka – sports figure
- Thomas Leonard Wells – politician

=== 1999 ===
- William Blake – Community activist
- Doris Boissoneau – Ojibwe language activist
- Paul Michel Bosc – Wine-maker
- Mavis Elaine Burke – Educator, advocate for early childhood education and community activist
- Clarice Chalmers – Philanthropist
- Keshav Chandaria – philanthropist
- Susan Charness – disability-rights activist
- Sam John Ciccolini – entrepreneur and philanthropist
- Esther Farlinger – charity fundraiser
- Victor Feldbrill – violinist, orchestral conductor and champion of Canadian music
- Dr. James Ferguson – medical researcher
- Maxwell Goldhar – businessman, philanthropist
- Doris Lau – financial adviser, charity fundraiser, goodwill ambassador for Ontario and scholarship sponsor
- Eileen McGregor – community activist
- Winnie "Roach" Leuszler – first Canadian to swim the English Channel, sportswoman
- Alice King Sculthorpe – community activist
- Dr. Bette Stephenson – physician, founding member of the College of Family Physicians of Canada, former Ontario Progressive Conservative MPP and cabinet minister
- Hin Cheung Tam – community activist
- Gordie Tapp – entertainer
- Anthony Toldo – industrialist, philanthropist, bicyclist
- Lisette Véron-Rainu – children's activist
- Ken Watts – Founder of the Ontario Collegiate Drama Festival

=== 2000 ===
- Danielle Allen and Normand Pellerin – educators
- Maggie Atkinson – Lawyer and AIDS activist
- Marilyn Brooks – Fashion designer and philanthropist
- Nickie Cassidy – activist on behalf of sufferers of multiple sclerosis
- Ernie Checkeris – Educator and activist, Chancellor of Thorneloe University, Sudbury
- George A. Cohon – Chicago-born lawyer; founder/senior chairman of McDonald's Restaurants of Canada; philanthropist
- Lloyd Dennis – educator
- William Andrew Dimma – businessman and educator
- Kildare Dobbs – writer, journalist
- Joyce Fee – educator and community activist
- Dr. Robert Freedom – physician, professor and author
- Donald H. Harron – journalist, author and actor
- Jane Jacobs – U.S.-born naturalized Canadian author; Toronto-based urban philosopher
- Stephan Lewar – venture capitalist, financier and philanthropist
- Janet MacInnis – fundraiser and volunteer
- Frank Miller – politician (former Premier of Ontario)
- Betty Oliphant – founder of the National Ballet School of Canada
- J. Robert S. Prichard – educator, author and former President of the University of Toronto
- Joseph Radmore – athlete, member of the Canadian Paralympic Team
- Margaret M. Risk – nurse
- Haroon Siddiqui – journalist, columnist
- Dr. Calvin Stiller – physician
- Donald A. Stuart – gold and silversmith
- Dr. Lap-Chee Tsui – molecular geneticist; Vice-Chancellor of the University of Hong Kong
- Irving Ungerman – entrepreneur, boxer and activist

=== 2001 ===
- Richard M. Alway – President/Vice-Chancellor of St. Michael's College, promoter of Catholic-Anglican dialogue in Canada
- Gwen M. Boniface – first female Ontario Provincial Police Commissioner
- Rita Burak – public servant
- Danielle Campo – athlete, member of the Canadian Paralympic Team
- Michael "Pinball" Clemons – President and former player of the Toronto Argonauts
- Ken Danby – artist
- Terry Daynard – researcher, teacher
- Terrence J. Donnelly – fundraiser for cardiac research and development
- Gail J. Donner – Dean of the Faculty of Nursing at the University of Toronto; Executive Director of the Registered Nurses Association of Ontario
- Fredrik Stefan Eaton – businessman, community volunteer
- C. Dennis Flynn – elected official, fundraiser, community volunteer and war veteran
- Prof. Dr. Nicolas D. Georganas – pioneer in multimedia medical communications and telelearning
- Helen Haddow – community activist
- Paul Kells – workplace safety advocate
- Jake Lamoureux – Volunteer with young people
- Alexina Louie – composer of classical music
- Lewis W. MacKenzie, Major General (Retired) – Ontario Director of ICROSS Canada, the International Community for the Relief of Starvation and Suffering
- Signe and Robert McMichael – builders and donors of the McMichael Canadian Art Collection of Group of Seven paintings in Kleinburg
- Dusty Miller – patron of the arts, artistic director of the Cambrian Players
- David Mirvish – leader in the development and promotion of the visual arts in Ontario
- Peter Nesbitt Oliver – historian
- James S. Redpath – Chancellor of Nipissing University
- Dr. Donald T. Stuss – clinical psychologist, neuropsychologist and behavioural neuroscientist
- Bhausaheb Ubale – human rights activist
- Dr. Carin Wittnich – University of Toronto professor and researcher
- Madeline Ziniak – Vice-president and executive producer of CFMT television, promoter of multiculturalism

=== 2002 ===
- Peggy Baker – dancer, choreographer and teacher; founder of the Toronto-based Dancemakers
- James Bartleman – Lieutenant Governor of Ontario
- Marilyn Bell DiLascio – first person to swim Lake Ontario (1954)
- David Blackwood – artist
- Frederick M. Catzman – lawyer
- Austin Clarke – author, teacher, mentor, writer-in-residence at the University of Toronto; recipient of the 2002 Giller Prize
- Barbara Chilcott – actress
- Mario Cortellucci – fundraiser
- Patricia Freeman Marshall – community activist
- Irving R. Gerstein – businessman, philanthropist
- Joan Goldfarb – teacher of adults with disabilities
- Walter Gretzky – Ambassador for the Canadian National Institute for the Blind and the Heart and Stroke Foundation of Canada and father of Wayne Gretzky
- Phyllis M. Grosskurth – Professor emerita and Fellow, Massey College, University of Toronto; 1965 winner of the Governor General's Award for non-fiction
- Dr. Raymond O. Heimbecker – cardiovascular surgeon
- Patrick John Keenan – volunteer
- Tom Kneebone – actor, playwright
- Burton Kramer – graphic designer
- Dr. Benson Lau – physician and teacher
- J. Douglas Lawson – Vice-Chairman of the Ontario Arts Council
- Rhéal Leroux – Volunteer, former president of the Festival Franco-Ontarien
- Dr. William K. Lindsay – surgeon and professor
- Joan Murray – art historian, former director of the Robert McLaughlin Gallery in Oshawa
- Dr. Mark J. Poznansky – President and Scientific Director of the Robarts Research Institute
- Dr. Joanna Santa Barbara – physician, national president of the Physicians for Global Survival
- Thomas H. B. Symons – founder of Trent University and its president and vice-chancellor (from 1961–72)
- Lela Wilson – artists' rights activist

=== 2003 ===
- Joseph J. Barnicke – businessman and philanthropist
- John Kim Bell – musician, promoter of Aboriginal culture
- Col. Archibald J. D. Brown – businessman, community activist
- Dorothy Ellen Duncan – Executive Director of The Ontario Historical Society, teacher, curator
- Julian Fantino – police officer, former Chief of Police for London, York Region and Toronto; Ontario's Commissioner of Emergency Management; now Commissioner of the Ontario Provincial Police
- Mary Germain – community activist
- Dr. Avis E. Glaze – teacher, administrator, writer and international educator
- Dr. Benjamin Goldberg – psychiatrist
- Doris Grinspun – Executive Director of the Registered Nurses' Association of Ontario (RNAO)
- George Gross – Corporate Sports Editor of Sun Media Corporation
- Macklin Hancock – pioneer in urban planning, urban design and landscape architecture
- Ryan Hreljac – elementary school student, committed to raising funds for clean water and sanitation projects around the world since the age of six
- Dr. Frederic Jackman – psychologist
- Laura Louise Legge – lawyer, community activist
- Helen Lu – volunteer, organizer and fundraiser for charitable organizations in Toronto
- Dr. Donald Mackay – Professor of Environmental and Resource Studies at Trent University, and director of the Canadian Environmental Modelling Centre
- Hon. Jack Marshall – Second World War veteran, Member of Parliament, Senator, and activist
- Anna Porter – writer, book publisher
- Hon. Robert Keith Rae – Member of Parliament, former Premier of Ontario, lawyer
- Eric Wilfrid Robinson – promoter of adult education
- Diane Simard Broadfoot – community activist
- Joan Thompson – volunteer
- Rita Tsang – businesswoman
- Hon. Mabel Van Camp – judge; first woman on the Supreme Court of Ontario
- Mike Weir – golfer; first Canadian to win the Masters Golf Tournament
- Kirk Albert Walter Wipper – environmentalist, heritage conservationist and fitness advocate (died 2011)
- William John Withrow – former director of the Art Gallery of Ontario (AGO)

=== 2004 ===
- Dr. Tyseer Aboulnasr – engineer
- Jeff Adams – Paralympian and world champion in wheelchair sports
- Mohammad Azhar Ali Khan – journalist, multiculturalism expert
- Diana Alli – outreach worker
- Patricia Ann Arato – aphasia care volunteer
- Dr. Robin F. Badgley – sociologist, founder of Department of Behavioural Science at the University of Toronto
- Iain Baxter& – conceptual artist
- Louise Binder – speaker on HIV/AIDS issues
- Richard Bradshaw – director of the Canadian Opera Company
- Leonard A. Braithwaite – lawyer and former MPP
- Dr. Inez Elliston – educator, community volunteer
- Adele Fifield – director of "The War Amps"
- Joan Francolini – community volunteer
- Sheldon Galbraith – figure skating coach
- Dr. Allan Gross – Professor of Surgery, Faculty of Medicine, University of Toronto
- Andrea Hansen – violinist
- Joyce Ann Lange – advocate for the hearing impaired
- Delores Lawrence – leading female entrepreneur and philanthropist
- René J. Marin – respected Francophone jurist
- David McGirr – community volunteer in Northern Ontario
- Anthony Pawson – scientist known for research of signal transduction in cells
- Kim Phuc Phan Thi – Vietnamese napalm victim
- John Rochon – marksman
- Chandrakant Shah – public health educator
- Gordon Surgeoner – entomologist specializing in insect transmitted diseases
- Galen Weston – businessman in food services sector
- Reverend Monsignor Lawrence Anthony Wnuk – outreach worker to the Polish community
- James Young – former Chief Coroner
- Margaret Zeidler – architect

=== 2005 ===
- Naomi Alboim – public servant
- Ron Barbaro – community service
- Harold Brathwaite – educator
- Boris Brott – conductor (Hamilton Philharmonic Orchestra)
- Donald Carr – lawyer
- Brian Desbiens – educator
- Thomas Dignan – Aboriginal healthcare advocate
- Deborah Ellis – children's author, human rights advocate
- Hughes Eng – community service
- Brenda L. Gallie – Expert in the treatment of retinoblastoma
- Dorothy Griffiths – researcher, educator
- William A. Harshaw – fundraiser for Parkinson's disease
- John Honderich – former editor and publisher, Toronto Star
- Leon Katz – engineer, medical inventor
- Gisèle Lalonde – educator
- Mike Lazaridis – founder, Research in Motion; inventor, BlackBerry
- Beatrice Levis – advocate for social justice
- Nancy Lockhart – Chair, Ontario Science Centre
- Ernest McCulloch – pioneer in stem cell biology
- Lillian McGregor – teacher of aboriginal languages
- Sher Ali Mirza – engineer
- Ratna Omidvar – former president, Ontario Council of Agencies Serving Immigrants
- Sandra Rotman – philanthropist
- Mark Starowicz – broadcaster, journalist
- Marlene Streit – professional golfer
- Ronald W. Taylor – physician in sports medicine; team physician to the Toronto Blue Jays
- James Till – pioneer in stem cell biology
- John Walker Whiteside – assistant crown attorney
- Moses Znaimer – broadcaster

=== 2007 ===
- Thomas J. Bitove – businessman, community activist
- John Richard Bond – University of Toronto astrophysicist and cosmologist
- Bernice and Rolland Desnoyers – foster parents for children and youth since 1960
- Peter J. George – economist, author, President and Vice Chancellor of McMaster University in Hamilton and Chair of the Council of Ontario Universities
- Christopher A. Harris – cofounder of the Ottawa-Carleton Immigrant Services Organization, the National Capital Alliance on Race Relations and the Jamaican Ottawa Community Association
- Peter Herrndorf – Broadcasting executive
- Rebecca F. Jamieson – First Nations activist
- Max Keeping – Ottawa media personality
- M. David Lepofsky – disability activist
- Dr. Tak W. Mak – biomedical scientist
- J. William McConkey – University of Windsor professor
- Dr. Roderick R. McInnes – University of Toronto professor and senior scientist with the Hospital for Sick Children
- R. Roy McMurtry – former Chief Justice of Ontario and Attorney General of Ontario
- Lorraine Monk – author, photographer, and artist
- Albert Kai-Wing Ng – graphic designer and creator of graphic design accreditation
- Adeena Niazi – helping newcomers settle in Canada
- Gordon M. Nixon – President/CEO of the Royal Bank of Canada
- Margaret Helen Ogilvie – Chancellor's Professor of Law at Carleton University
- Eva Olsson – Holocaust survivor
- Marlene Ann Pierre – Aboriginal activist
- Dr. Frances A. Shepherd – University of Toronto professor
- Janice Gross Stein – scholar, academic
- Paul-François Sylvestre – novelist, researcher and mentor
- William Thorsell – Director/CEO of the Royal Ontario Museum
- Dr. David Walde – Director of the Oncology Program
- Dr. Paul Walfish – University of Toronto professor and senior consultant

=== 2008 ===
- Dr. Michael Baker – physician, cancer researcher
- Dr. Sheela Basrur – Former Chief Medical Officer of Ontario
- George Brady – human rights advocate, public speaker and Auschwitz survivor
- Jack Chiang – journalist, community service
- Tony Dean – Secretary of the Cabinet, credited with improving the Ontario Public Service
- Mary Dickson – lawyer, educator and advocate for people with disabilities
- Noel Edison – Artistic Director of the Elora Festival and the conductor of the Toronto Mendelssohn Choir
- Frank Fernandes – Toronto businessman and volunteer
- Jean-Robert Gauthier – for his work in advancing French-language education
- Sam George – Native Canadians' rights activist
- Heather Gibson – educator specializing in American Sign Language (ASL)
- Robert A. Gordon – served as president of Humber College
- Gordon Gray – philanthropist
- Susan Hoeg – community service on behalf of the Georgina Island Chippewas
- Claude Lamoureux – served as president and CEO of the Ontario Teachers' Pension Plan
- Patrick Le Sage – served as Chief Justice for the Ontario Superior Court of Justice
- Dr. Joe MacInnis – physician, scientist and undersea explorer
- Dr. David MacLennan – biomedical scientist, expert in biochemistry, genetics and physiology of muscle function
- Lorna Marsden – served as President of York University and of Wilfrid Laurier University, and a former senator.
- David Peterson – former Premier of Ontario
- Ed Ratushny – expert on the Canadian judiciary
- Rosemary Sadlier – author and president of the Ontario Black History Society
- Dr. Fuad Sahin – for his contributions to community service; founder of the International Development and Relief Foundation.
- Barbara Ann Scott-King – Olympic champion figure skater in 1948
- Ellen Seligman – for contributions to publishing and support of Canadian authors
- Peter Silverman – broadcaster and consumer advocate
- David Smith – philanthropist
- Ted Szilva – originator and developer of the Big Nickel Project
- Mary Welsh – for 35 years of community and civic contributions

=== 2009 ===
- Constance Backhouse – legal scholar and historian
- Dr. Philip Berger – physician and leader in the fields of urban medicine, addiction, homelessness and HIV/AIDS care
- Lawrence Bloomberg – businessman and philanthropist
- Lesley Jane Boake – educator and founder of Canine Opportunity, People Empowerment
- Dr. Helen Chan – clinical oncologist
- Peter Crossgrove – businessman and charity fundraiser
- Mike DeGagné – community leader and advocate for Aboriginal peoples
- Levente Diosady – a leader in the field of food process engineering
- Fraser Dougall – media owner and philanthropist
- Jacques Flamand – writer and promoter of Franco-Ontarian literature
- Jean Gagnon – an advocate for the health and safety of workers
- Paul Godfrey – Chair of Metro Toronto (1973–1984), businessman
- Peter Godsoe – businessman
- Ovid Jackson – provincial politician
- Dr. Kellie Leitch – orthopaedic pediatric surgeon; Assoc. Professor of Medicine, University of Toronto
- Gerry Lougheed, Jr. – funeral director and volunteer
- Diana Mady Kelly – theatre director and teacher of dramatic arts
- Naseem Mahdi – spiritual leader
- Dr. Samantha Nutt – Executive Director, War Child Canada
- Dr. James Orbinski – physician; Associate Professor of Medicine, University of Toronto; President of Médecins Sans Frontières (1998–2001)
- Bonnie Patterson – former president of Ryerson University
- Shirley Peruniak – park naturalist and conservationist
- Alice Porter – nurse and missionary
- Ken Shaw – news anchor (CTV) and philanthropist
- Janet Stewart – lawyer and philanthropist
- Shirley Thomson – civil servant
- George Turnbull – expert in financial services and philanthropist
- Dr. Mladen Vranic – physician and researcher
- Dr. Anne-Marie Zajdlik – physician and female AIDS activist

=== 2010 ===
- Suhayya Abu-Hakima – technology entrepreneur and volunteer
- Russell Bannock – fighter pilot and Second World War commander
- Gail Beck – child and adolescent psychiatrist and champion of the HPV public immunization program
- Joseph Chin – medical pioneer and a leader in the prevention and treatment of prostate cancer
- Lynn Factor – social worker
- Gerald Fagan – choral conductor, teacher and mentor
- Nigel Fisher – former president of UNICEF Canada
- Jacques Flamand
- Lillie Johnson – Ontario's first black director of public health
- Ignat Kaneff – developer and philanthropist
- Mobeenuddin Hassan Khaja – founder of the Association of Progressive Muslims of Ontario and Canada
- Elizabeth Ann Kinsella – founder of the Youville Centre
- Huguette Labelle – civil servant and the first woman to lead the Red Cross in Canada
- Elizabeth Le Geyt – writer and birdwatcher
- Clare Lewis – former Crown attorney and judge
- Louise Logue – expert advisor in the field of crime prevention
- Gordon McBean – scientist and environmentalist
- Wilma Morrison – educator, historian and founder of the Niagara Black History Association
- James Orbinski
- Coulter Osborne – lawyer and former associate chief of justice
- Chris Paliare – civil litigator
- Gilles G. Patry – consultant, researcher, and a university administrator
- Dave Shannon – lawyer
- Molly Shoichet – researcher
- Howard Sokolowski – leader in the home building industry and philanthropist
- Edward Sonshine – entrepreneur and philanthropist
- Reginald Stackhouse – author, retired politician and co-founder of Centennial College
- David Staines – scholar, professor, literary critic and writer
- Martin Teplitsky – mediator-arbitrator, Lawyer and founder of the Lawyers Feed the Hungry program
- Dave Toycen – president and CEO of World Vision Canada
- John Ronald Wakegijig – launched a mental health program for First Nations youth and established Rainbow Lodge
- Elizabeth Hillman Waterston – researcher and writer

=== 2011 ===
- Peter Adams – politician, professor and volunteer
- Dr. Anna Banerji – helped create the Immigrant Health and Infectious Disease Clinic and the Canadian Refugee Health Conference
- Dr. Sandra E. Black – cognitive neurologists specializing in stroke and dementia
- Paul Cavalluzzo – Lawyer, Senior Partner, Cavalluzzo Shilton McIntyre Cornish LLP, Barristers and Solicitors
- Catherine Colquhoun – volunteer
- David Crombie – three-term mayor of Toronto
- Nathalie Des Rosiers – legal expert
- Marcel Desautels – philanthropist
- Sara Diamond – artist and president of OCAD University
- Charles Garrad – archaeologist, historian, and scholar
- Peter Gilgan – developer and philanthropist
- Frank Hayden – created Special Olympics International
- Donald Jackson – world gold medalist in male figure skating
- Zeib Jeeva – founding member of the Nelson Mandela Children's Fund
- Howard McCurdy – scientist, civil rights activist and MPP
- Arthur McDonald – physicist
- Noella Milne – lawyer and volunteer
- Suzanne Pinel – French-language educator and television personality
- Ucal Powell – head of Ontario's Carpenter's Union
- Barbara Reid – children's author and illustrator
- Alison Rose – documentary filmmaker and reporter
- Linda Schuyler – co-creator and executive producer of the Degrassi television franchise
- Dr. Louis Siminovitch – geneticist
- Rahul Singh – founder of GlobalMedic
- Connie Smith – journalist, television host and teacher
- The Honourable Ray Stortini – retired Superior Court Judge
- John Tory – lawyer, business leader, community activist, broadcaster and former MPP

=== 2012 ===
- Dr. Izzeldin Abuelaish – physician, human rights and peace activist
- Michael Burgess – actor and singer
- Mark Cohon – commissioner of the Canadian Football League
- Glen Cook – businessman and restored and preserved the historic Puce River Black Community Cemetery
- Stephen Cook – computer scientist
- Phyllis Creighton – chair of the Ontario Mental Health Foundation and the Addiction Research Foundation's clinical institute
- Michael Davies – businessman and philanthropist
- Ronald Deibert – director of the Citizen Lab at the University of Toronto's Munk School of Global Affairs
- Dr. Rory Fisher – headed the Department of Extended Care at Sunnybrook Hospital in Toronto for almost 20 years
- Anne Golden – administrator
- Joan Green – Toronto Board of Education's first female CEO
- Dr. Vladimir Hachinski – neurologist and teacher
- John D. Honsberger – lawyer
- Dr. Shafique Keshavjee – thoracic surgeon and world leader in lung transplantation
- Fr. Joseph MacDonald – founder of Poverello Charities Ontario
- Don MacKinnon – advocate of Ontario's energy industry
- Deepa Mehta – filmmaker and women's rights activist
- Vincent Pawis – Native Inmate Liaison Officer
- Sr. Helen Petrimoulx – advocate for refugees
- The Honourable Sydney Robins – Supreme Court of Ontario judge
- Dr. Gail Robinson – psychiatrist, professor and advocate, she co-founded Canada's first rape crisis centre
- Mamdouh Shoukri – president and vice-chancellor of York University
- Barry Smit – professor and climate change researcher
- Brian Stewart – reporter and foreign correspondent
- Frank Tierney – teacher and founder of the Borealis Press and Tecumseh Press

=== 2013 ===
- Irving Abella – scholar and historian
- Dr. Mohit Bhandari – orthopaedic surgeon and researcher
- Paul Burston – public servant
- George E. Carter – lawyer and the first Canadian-born Black judge
- Ellen Campbell – founder and CEO of the Canadian Centre for Abuse Awareness
- Penny Collenette – leader and innovator
- Ronald Common – President of Sault College
- Paul Corkum – physicist and the father of attosecond science
- David Cronenberg – filmmaker
- Alvin Curling – first Black Speaker of the Ontario Legislature
- Allison Fisher – Executive Director of Wabano Centre for Aboriginal Health
- Claude Gingras – former chair of the Fondation Franco-Ontarienne
- Avvy Yao Yao Go – lawyer
- Piers Handling – Director and CEO of the Toronto International Film Festival
- Paul Henderson – hockey player and mentor
- Justin Hines – singer, songwriter and founder of Justin Hines Foundation
- Ronald Jamieson – former Senior Vice President of Aboriginal Banking at BMO Financial Group
- Jeanne Lamon – Music Director of Toronto's Tafelmusik Baroque Orchestra
- Frances Noronha – civil servant
- Lyn McLeod – former leader of the Ontario Liberal Party
- Diane Morrison – former Executive Director of the Mission, an Ottawa homeless shelter
- Steve Paikin – journalist and television host
- Dr. James Rutka – pediatric neurosurgeon and researcher
- Adel Sedra – engineering scholar, professor and administrator
- Toby Tanenbaum – philanthropist and volunteer

=== 2014 ===
- Mary Anne Chambers – Cabinet Minister and MPP
- Ming-Tat Cheung – cardiologist and medical researcher
- Michael Dan – neurosurgeon and philanthropists
- Don Drummond – economist
- Rick Green – performer, writer and advocate for people with ADD
- Patrick Gullane – head and neck surgeon
- Joseph Halstead – civil servant and administrator
- Alis Kennedy – Métis leader
- Sylvie Lamoureux – teacher, scholar, and academic
- Gilles LeVasseur – lawyer, economist and professor
- Gary Levy – founding Director of the Multi-Organ Transplant Program at Toronto General Hospital
- Sidney B. Linden – former Chief Justice of the Ontario Court of Justice
- Barbara MacQuarrie – advocate for women's rights
- Eva Marszewski – founder and Executive Director of Peacebuilders International
- Marilyn McHarg – Co-founder and former Executive Director of the Canadian branch of Doctors Without Borders/Médécins Sans Frontières
- Hans Messner – scientist and physician
- James Murray – philanthropist
- Robert Nixon – former Minister of Finance and leader of the Ontario Liberal Party
- Dhun Noria – surgical pathologist
- Maryka Omatsu – retired Ontario Court Justice and Canada's first Asian-Canadian female judge
- Charles Pachter – artist
- John Ralston Saul – writer and lecturer
- Najmul Siddiqui – entrepreneur, community leader and philanthropist
- Jeffrey Turnbull – physician, humanitarian and Medical Director of Ottawa Inner City Health
- Dolores Wawia – pioneer in native education
- David Williams – Canadian astronaut, physician and scientist
- Warren Winkler – former labour lawyer, mediator and Chief Justice of Ontario

=== 2015 ===
- Hugh Allen – Surgeon and Specialist in Obstetrics and Gynecology
- Susan Bailey – Nurse, Teacher and Pioneer in Palliative care
- Isabel Bassett – Former Ontario Cabinet Minister and MPP
- Monica Elaine Campbell – Pioneer in the Development of Palliative Care Services for the Deaf in Ontario
- Dennis Chippa – Community Leader and Humanitarian
- Wendy Craig – Professor of Psychology at Queen's University and Expert on the Prevention of Bullying
- Gordon Cressy – Former Politician, Public Servant, Humanitarian, Mentor and Youth Advocate
- Madeline Edwards – Community Advocate and Founding Member of the Congress of Black Women of Mississauga and Area Chapter
- Hoda ElMaraghy – Professor and Director of the Intelligent Manufacturing Systems Centre at the University of Windsor
- Robert Fowler – Critical Care Physician at Sunnybrook Health Sciences Centre and Associate Professor of Medicine and Critical Care Medicine at the University of Toronto
- Herbert Gaisano – Professor and Researcher at the University of Toronto's Faculty of Medicine and Gastroenterologists
- John Gignac – Veteran Fire Captain
- June Girvan – Founder of the J'Nikira Dinqinesh Education Centre in Ottawa
- Beverley Gordon – Founding CEO of The Safehaven Project for Community Living
- Richard Gosling – community leader and youth advocate
- Stephen Goudge – Former Judge in the Court of Appeal for Ontario
- Anton Kuerti – Concert Pianist and Composer
- Rita Letendre – Painter, Muralist and Printmaker
- Jackie Maxwell – Artistic Director of the Shaw Festival
- Errol Mendes – Professor of Law at the University of Ottawa, Author and Advocate for the Universal Application of Human Rights
- Julian Nedzelski – Ear, Nose and Throat Specialist and Head and Neck Surgeon at the Sunnybrook Health Sciences Centre and a Pioneer of Cochlear Implants in Ontario
- Mike Parkhill – Founder of SayITFirst
- René Pitre – Business Leader and Advocate of French Language Culture, Community and Education in Ontario
- Donna Trella – Founder of Reach for the Rainbow
- Stanley Zlotkin – A Nutrition Specialist and Researcher at The Hospital for Sick Children

=== 2016 ===
- Peter A. Adamson – Surgical Specialist in Otolaryngology
- Mehran Anvari – Surgical Robotics Pioneer
- Donovan Bailey – Track and Field Icon
- Jennifer Bond – Professor of Law and Human Rights Advocate
- Angèle Brunelle – Advocate for Northwest Ontario's Francophone Community
- Ronald F. Caza – Lawyer and Defender of Francophone Linguistic Rights
- Anthony Kam Chuen Chan – Pediatric Hematologist and Scientist
- Ethel Côté – Entrepreneur, Volunteer and Community leader
- Jim Estill – Entrepreneur and Philanthropist
- Carol Finlay – Anglican Priest and Education Advocate
- Cheryl Forchuk – Scholar in the Fields of Homelessness, Poverty and Mental Health
- Dorothée Gizenga – International Development Expert and Human Rights Advocate
- Shirley Greenberg – Lawyer and Women's Rights Advocate
- Robert Pio Hajjar – Motivational Speaker
- Greta Hodgkinson – Prima Ballerina
- Dorothy Anna Jarvis – Pediatrician
- Lisa LaFlamme – Broadcast Journalist
- M.G. Venkatesh Mannar – Expert in Food Science Technologies and Nutrition
- Ernest Matton (Little Brown Bear) – Community Capacity Builder and Spiritual Ambassador
- Dennis O'Connor – former Associate Chief Justice of Ontario
- David Pearson – Professor and Promoter of Science Communication
- Fran Rider – Women's Hockey Advocate
- Beverley Salmon – Anti-Racism and Community Activist
- Hugh Segal – Public Servant
- Helga Stephenson – Arts Administrator and Human Rights Activist
- Margo Timmins – Vocalist

=== 2017 ===
- Dr. Upton Allen – pediatric infectious disease specialist
- Daniel Aykroyd – actor and entrepreneur
- Dr. Alan Bernstein – cancer researcher and research leader
- Dr. David Cechetto – neuroscientist and director of international medical development projects
- Dr. Peter Chang – lawyer and psychiatrist
- The Honourable Sandra Chapnik – lawyer and judge
- Dr. Tom Chau – biomedical engineer
- Dr. Dorothy Cotton – psychologist and mental health advocate
- Peter Dinsdale – Anishinaabe community leader
- Leslie Fagan – singer and promoter of Canadian music
- Michael Geist – scholar and public intellectual
- Shashi Kant – professor of forest resource economics
- Myrtha Lapierre – retired nursing professor
- Floyd Laughren – former MPP and Finance Minister
- Michael Lee-Chin – entrepreneur and philanthropist
- Gail Nyberg – former Daily Bread Food Bank executive director and former school trustee
- Dr. Dilkhush Panjwani – psychiatrist
- Elder Geraldine Robertson – educator and advocate for residential school survivors
- Allan Rock – former politician and UN Ambassador
- Robert J. Sawyer – celebrated science-fiction author
- Sandra Shamas – writer, performer and comedian
- Elizabeth Sheehy – criminal law, scholar
- Ilse Treurnicht – CEO and advocate for women and innovation

=== 2018 ===
- Jean Augustine – politician and social justice advocate
- Salah Bachir – businessman and philanthropist
- Dr. Sue Carstairs – veterinarian and conservationist
- Ralph Chiodo – entrepreneur and philanthropist
- Dr. Zane Cohen – colorectal surgeon
- Dwayne De Rosario – soccer player
- Michele DiEmanuele – CEO and public servant
- Philip Epstein – lawyer, scholar in family law
- Dr. Aaron Fenster – biomedical physicist
- Mark Freiman – lawyer, public servant and former Deputy Attorney General of Ontario
- Emmanuelle Gattuso – philanthropist
- Mary Gordon – social entrepreneur, educator and child advocate
- Edward Greenspon – journalist
- Spider Jones – sports journalist, author and member of the Canadian Boxing Hall of Fame
- Neal Jotham – animal welfare advocate
- Dalton McGuinty – provincial politician and former Premier of Ontario 2003-2013
- Peter Menkes – businessman
- Janice O'Born – entrepreneur and philanthropist
- Cheryl Perea – child advocate
- Dr. Lyne Pitre – physician and educator
- Col. A. Britton (Brit) Smith – philanthropist

=== 2019 ===
- Melanie Adrian – law professor at Carleton University
- Roland Armitage – former Ontario politician and Member of the Canadian Horse Racing Hall of Fame
- Dr. Allan Carswell – physicist
- Helen Ching-Kircher – businesswoman and philanthropist
- John Colangeli – CEO of Lutherwood and Lutherwood Child and Family Foundation
- Nancy Coldham – businesswoman and philanthropist
- Sean Conway – former Ontario Cabinet Minister under David Peterson
- Clare Copeland – former Chair of Toronto Hydro
- Barbara Croall – composer and musician
- Lisa Farano – charity executive
- Geoffrey Fernie – biomedical engineer
- Dr. Allan Fox – neuroscientist
- John Freund – author and peace activist
- Susan Hay – journalist
- Dr. John Jennings – historian
- Dr. Marlys Koschinsky – Biochemistry Professor
- James W. Leech – former head of the Ontario Teachers' Pension Plan
- Audrey Loeb – law professor
- Dani Reiss – President and CEO of Canada Goose Incorporated
- Janis Rotman – philanthropist
- Linda Silver Dranoff – lawyer
- Joan Sutton Straus – journalist

=== 2020 ===
- Daniel Allen – public servant
- Dr. Joseph Raymond Buncic – physician at The Hospital for Sick Children
- Michael DeGasperis – property developer and philanthropist
- Dr. Raymond Desjardins – atmospheric scientist
- Ernest Eves – former Premier of Ontario 2002-2003
- Hershell Ezrin – public servant
- Carlo Fidani – businessman and philanthropist
- Karen Goldenberg – occupational therapist
- Michael Deane Harris – former Premier of Ontario 1995-2002
- Ellis Jacob – President and CEO of Cineplex Entertainment
- Dr. Jing Jiang – engineering professor at the University of Western Ontario
- Dr. Shana O. Kelley – professor at the University of Toronto
- Dr. André Lapierre – linguistics professor at the University of Ottawa
- Dale Lastman – lawyer
- André M. Levesque – soldier
- Dr. Peter Liu – cardiologist
- Hazel McCallion – former Mayor of Mississauga 1978-2014
- Arden McGregor – humanitarian
- Janet McKelvy – philanthropist
- George McLean – artist
- Hon. Rosemary Moodie – Senator
- Hon. Robert W. Runciman – former Senator 2010-2017
- Dr. Marilyn Sonley – pediatric oncologist
- Ahmad Reza Tabrizi – philanthropist
- Hon. Karen M. Weiler – former judge

=== 2021 ===
- Payam Akhavan - human rights lawyer
- Walter Arbib - co-founder of SkyLink Aviation
- Teresa Cascioli - former CEO of Hamilton’s Lakeport Brewing
- George Chuvalo - heavyweight boxing champion
- Angela Cooper Brathwaite - nurse
- Aimée Craft - researcher, professor, and author
- Stephen Diamond - philanthropist
- Nishan Duraiappah - Chief of Police for Peel Region
- Mitch Frazer - attorney
- Leo Goldhar - philanthropist
- Steve (Suresh) Gupta - businessman
- Elise Harding-Davis - museum curator and professor
- Armand P. La Barge - President of the Ontario Association of Chiefs of Police
- Sandra Laronde - artist
- Dave Levac - former Member of Provincial Parliament
- David McKay - CEO of the Royal Bank of Canada
- Barbara Morrongiello - doctor
- Lori Nikkel - CEO of Second Harvest
- Rose M. Patten - banker
- Christina Petrowska-Quilico - pianist
- Robert Poirier - former chair of Billy Bishop Toronto City Airport
- Kevin Smith - hospital administrator
- Joan VanDuzer - creator of the Harbinger Foundation
- Sara Waxman - author and journalist

=== 2022 ===
- Dyane Adam - commissioner of official languages
- Cindy Adams - Executive Director of Scientists in School
- Jordan Bitove - owner of Torstar
- Vanessa Burkoski - former Chief Nursing Officer of Ontario
- Dr. Michael Cheng - child psychiatrist
- Dianne Cunningham - former Member of Provincial Parliament
- Andre De Grasse - athlete and Olympic Gold Medalist
- Rhoda Howard-Hassmann - human rights scholar
- Dr. David J. Jenkins - researcher and professor
- Christina Jennings - producer
- Dr. Mohamed Lachemi - researcher and educator
- Eric Lindros - ice hockey player
- Arthur Lockhart - educator
- Lorin MacDonald - human rights lawyer
- Christine Nesbitt - speed skater and Olympic medalist
- Dr. Beverley A. Orser - physician and scientist
- Pauline Shirt - indigenous educator
- Dr. Frank Silver - neurologist
- Dr. John P. Smol - environmental researcher
- Dr. David Tannenbaum - physician
- Biagio Vinci - owner of Biagio and founder of social service programs
- Dr. Ajay Virmani - CEO
- Dr. Padraig Warde - oncologist
- Dr. MaryLynn West-Moynes - educator
- Marva Wisdom - Senior Fellow at the Munk School of Global Affairs
- Elizabeth Witmer - former Member of Parliament

=== 2023 ===
- Jay Aspin - educator and former Member of Parliament
- John M. Beck - founder of Aecon Group
- Jo-Anne Clarke - geriatrician
- Hon. David Collenette - former Member of Parliament and cabinet minister
- Claire Crooks - psychologist and researcher
- Julie Di Lorenzo - President of Mirabella Development Corp
- John English - author and former Member of Parliament
- Lee Errett - surgeon and professor
- Gervan Fearon - educator
- Patrick Foran - CTV Consumer Alert reporter and author
- Blake C. Goldring - entrepreneur and philanthropist
- Herbert Ho Ping Kong - doctor and educator
- Blake Hutcheson - CEO of Toronto-based OMERS
- Michael Latner - CEO of Shiplake Properties
- Bernard Leduc - CEO of Ottawa’s Hôpital Montfort
- Joy MacDermid - researcher
- Dwayne Morgan - creator of Up From The Roots Entertainment
- Florence Ngenzebuhoro - CEO of the Centre Francophone du Grand Toronto
- Hazelle Palmer - CEO of Sherbourne Health
- Fred Possmayer - researcher
- Peter Simon - President of The Royal Conservatory of Music
- Gary Slaight - CEO of Slaight Communications
- George Trusler - surgeon
- Raquel Urtasun - co-founder the Vector Institute
- Bhavana Varma - CEO of United Way of Kingston

=== 2024 ===
- Zanana Akande - former provincial Cabinet Minister
- Martin Antony - doctor and researcher
- Hon. Todd L. Archibald - former judge of the Ontario Superior Court of Justice
- Lise Bourgeois - teacher and entrepreneur
- Rudolph Bratty - founding partner of Brattys LLP
- Marilyn Denis - television and radio host
- Nick Di Donato - entrepreneur
- Brian Dunne - CEO of PHSS Support Services
- Diane Dupuy, CM - founder of Famous PEOPLE Players
- Jeremy Freeman - oncologist
- Vivek Goel, CM - public health researcher
- Brian Gover - lawyer
- Margery Holman - educator
- Royson James - journalist
- Kevin Junor, MMM, CD - military Captain
- Catherine Karakatsanis - engineer
- Winston Kassim, CM - executive at RBC
- Danielle Lussier - educator
- Alejandro Marangoni, OC, FRSC - researcher
- Mina Mawani - CEO of Dixon Hall
- Howard Ovens - researcher
- Jeanne-Lucille Pattison - curator of the McMichael Gallery
- Poonam Puri - governance advisor
- Elizabeth Richer - Indigenous social services
- Jean Seely - researcher
- Walied Soliman - lawyer
- Juliana Sprott - Chief Giving Officer of The Sprott Foundation
- Jennifer Suess - lawyer
- Joseph Vitale - founder of Italpasta

=== 2025 ===
- Ahmad Attia - CEO of Gestalt Communications
- Cameron Bailey - CEO of Toronto International Film Festival
- Arron Barberian - Restaurateur, Philanthropist, Accessibility Advocate
- Jean-Robert Bernier, Major-General (Retd) - Former Canada’s Surgeon General and Former chief medical adviser for NATO
- John B.W. Carmichael - Former Member of Parliament
- Dr. Jamaica Cass - Physician and Indigenous Health Advocate
- Don Cherry - Former ice hockey player, coach, and television commentator
- Donette Chin-Loy Chang - Philanthropist
- Dr. Robert James Cusimano - Cardiac surgeon
- Dr. Philip J. Devereaux - Physician and researcher (perioperative care)
- Dr. Morris Freedman - Physician and researcher (dementia care)
- Jacques Frémont - Former President and Vice-Chancellor of the University of Ottawa
- Dr. Kathleen Gartke - Orthopedic surgeon
- Professor Amanda Grzyb - Scholar in genocide studies
- Zabeen Hirji - former CHRO of Royal Bank of Canada and Founder Purposeful Third Act
- Elder Shirley Horn - First Chancellor of Algoma University
- Dr. Bernard Lawless - Trauma surgeon and researcher
- Nathan Leipciger - Holocaust survivor and human rights advocate
- David MacNaughton - Professional advisor and former Canadian Ambassador to the United States
- Joe Mancinelli - Trade union activist
- Claudette McGowan - CEO of Protexxa
- Tracy Moore - Canadian broadcaster and advocate
- Edward Rogers - Executive Chair of Rogers Communications
- Richard Rooney - co-founder of Burgundy Asset Management
- Dr. John L. Semple - Reconstructive surgeon
- Nancy Mei Chun Siew - Heritage preservationist
- Stephen J. R. Smith - co-founder of First National Financial
- Hon. George Strathy - Former Chief Justice of Ontario
- J. David Wake, KC - Former Associate Chief Justice of the Ontario Court of Justice and former Integrity Commissioner
- Dr. Mary Wells - Dean of Engineering at the University of Waterloo

=== 2026 ===
- Ahmad Attia - CEO
- Cameron Bailey - CEO of the Toronto International Film Festival
- Arron Barberian - accessibility advocate
- Major-General (Retd) Jean-Robert Bernier, OMM, CD - doctor
- John B.W. Carmichael - former Member of Parliament
- Jamaica Cass - doctor
- Don Cherry - broadcaster
- Donette Chin-Loy Chang - philanthropist
- Robert James Cusimano - doctor
- Philip J. Devereaux - doctor
- Morris Freedman - doctor
- Jacques Frémont - educator
- Kathleen Gartke - doctor
- Amanda Grzyb - educator
- Zabeen Hirji, MSM - philanthropist
- Shirley Horn - educator
- Bernard Lawless - doctor
- Nathan Leipciger, CM - human rights advocate
- David MacNaughton - diplomat
- Joe Mancinelli - union organizer
- Claudette McGowan, CM - entrepreneur
- Tracy Moore - broadcaster
- Edward Rogers - entrepreneur
- Richard Rooney - philanthropist
- John L. Semple - doctor
- Nancy Mei Chun Siew - organizer
- Stephen J. R. Smith - entrepreneur
- The Honourable George Strathy - judge
- J. David Wake, KC - judge
- Mary Wells - engineer
