= Marlys =

Marlys or Marlis is a women's given name. It is the name of:

- Marlys Edwardh (born 1950), Canadian lawyer
- Marlis Hochbruck (born 1964), German mathematician
- Marlys Koschinsky (born 1959), Canadian cardiovascular researcher
- Marlys Millhiser (1938–2017), American mystery author
- Marlis Spescha (born 1967), Swiss skier
- Marlis Petersen (born 1968), German opera singer
- Marlys West, American poet and writer

== See also ==
- Marlys, recurring character in the comics of Lynda Barry
