= Bernice Redmon =

First Black Canadian public health nurse

Bernice Isobel Redmon was a Canadian nurse. She was the first Black public health nurse in Canada.

== Early life and education ==
Bernice Redmon was born on October 28, 1917, in Toronto, Ontario, to George Nathaniel Carnegie and Jane Adina Mitchell, who emigrated from Jamaica in 1912. Raised in the northern suburbs of Toronto, she was one of nine children. Her family was the only Black family in the community.

During the 1940s, Black Canadians were systematically barred from enrolling in Canadian nursing schools due to an unwritten racial exclusion policy.The Registered Nurses' Association of Ontario sought to maintain a predominantly white nursing workforce.

Redmon moved to the United States, where educational opportunities were more accessible for Black students. She enrolled at St. Philip Hospital Medical College in Virginia, earning her nursing diploma in 1945. Initially studying for three years, she later received a scholarship to complete an additional year of study, earning a qualification in public health nursing.

== Career ==
On June 23, 1945, Bernice I. Carnegie Redmon became the first Canadian-born Black registered nurse in Canada. She faced difficulties finding employment due to racial discrimination in the healthcare system.

Eventually, she secured a position with the Nova Scotia Department of Health, where she practiced public health nursing. Before she began, she had to wait three months for the Board of Directors’ approval. Later in her career, she was appointed to the Victorian Order of Nurses, making her the first Black woman to hold this position in Canada.

== Advocacy and legacy ==
By the late 1950s, more Black women were employed in Ontario hospitals.Her contributions increased Black representation in healthcare and influenced organizations such as the Canadian Black Nurses Alliance (CBNA), which works to ensure inclusivity in the field.

Redmon died of lung cancer on October 23, 1993.
