= Warren Winkler =

Canadian jurist and former Chief Justice of Ontario

The Honourable Warren Winkler OC OOnt KC

Chief Justice of Ontario
- In office 2007–2013
- Preceded by: Roy McMurtry
- Succeeded by: George Strathy

Regional Senior Justice of the Ontario Superior Court of Justice for the Toronto Region
- In office 2004–2007
- Succeeded by: Edward Then

Personal details
- Born: December 10, 1938 (age 87) Virden, Manitoba
- Education: Brandon University; Osgoode Hall Law School

Warren Keith Winkler, OC, OOnt, KC (born December 10, 1938) is a Canadian jurist and a former Chief Justice of Ontario. Appointed by Prime Minister Stephen Harper on June 1, 2007, Winkler was previously Regional Senior Judge of the Ontario Superior Court of Justice for the Toronto Region. Winkler reached the mandatory retirement age of 75 on December 10, 2013, and has since retired as the Chief Justice of Ontario. He served as Chair of the Order of Ontario Advisory Council. Mr. Winkler is now a Member Arbitrator at Arbitration Place in Toronto.

== Legal career ==
Born in Virden, Manitoba, Winkler grew up in Pincher Creek, Alberta. He received a Bachelor of Arts degree in 1959 from Brandon University, a Bachelor of Laws degree in 1962 and a Master of Laws degree in 1964 from the Osgoode Hall Law School. He was called to the Bar of Ontario in 1965 and was created a Queen's Counsel in 1977. He was a partner in the law firm of Winkler, Filion & Wakely and practiced labour law on behalf of management. He was appointed to the Ontario Court of Justice (General Division) in 1993 and appointed Regional Senior Judge for Toronto Region in March 2004. He succeeded Roy McMurtry as Chief Justice in 2007.

== Public statements ==
Winkler is known as an outspoken critic of the cost and delays in the justice system and has given numerous speeches on this topic.

== Honours ==
In 2007, he was awarded an honorary degree from Brandon University.

In 2012, he was awarded an honorary PhD from York University.

He was appointed into the Order of Ontario in 2014.

On June 30, 2016, Winkler was named an Officer of the Order of Canada by Governor General David Johnston for "his contributions to the advancement of Canadian labour law and for making the justice system more effective and accessible as a former Chief Justice of the Ontario Court of Appeal."

Legal offices
Preceded by Roy McMurtry	Chief Justice of Ontario; 2007—2013	Succeeded by George R. Strathy
