= Raymond Moriyama =

Canadian architect (1929–2023)

Raymond Moriyama CC OOnt FRAIC
- Moriyama, c. 1948-49
- Born: October 11, 1929; Vancouver, British Columbia, Canada
- Died: September 1, 2023 (aged 93); Toronto, Ontario, Canada
- Education: University of Toronto; McGill School of Architecture
- Occupation: Architect
- Children: 5
- Awards: Governor General's Award in Visual and Media Arts; RAIC Gold Medal; Queen Elizabeth II Golden Jubilee Medal
- Practice: Moriyama & Teshima Architects
- Buildings: Canadian War Museum; Ottawa City Hall; Bata Shoe Museum; Scarborough Civic Centre

Raymond Junichi Moriyama CC OOnt FRAIC (October 11, 1929 – September 1, 2023) was a Canadian architect.

The private practice in Toronto he co-founded with Ted Teshima, Moriyama & Teshima Architects, was renowned for designing many major buildings across the world, including the Canadian War Museum and the Canadian Embassy in Tokyo. Moriyama's focus was on humane architecture with the pursuit of true ideals, democracy, and unanimity of all people.

== Early life and education ==
Born in Vancouver, British Columbia, Raymond Moriyama suffered burns across his back and all over his arm as a four-year-old and was sometimes teased about his scars. During the eight months he spent bedridden after the accident, he saw an architect coming and going from a nearby construction site "with a blueprint under his arm and a pipe in his mouth." Moriyama decided then and there that he would become an architect.

Moriyama's father was an outspoken pacifist who was arrested and imprisoned for his activism. Moriyama was then twelve; his mother, who was pregnant at the time, was left with him and his two sisters to run the family hardware store. Shortly after, Moriyama and his family were forced out of Vancouver and confined to the Bay Farm internment camp in the Slocan Valley of British Columbia during World War II. Japanese Canadians on the West Coast were classified as security threats, in a policy similar to that of the United States. Moriyama said these years were influential in his later career.

Moriyama described his experiences in internment camps as miserable. During this time, his mother experienced a miscarriage, which Moriyama grieved as the loss of a potential younger brother. He looked for a place for escape and solitude, and decided to build a treehouse outside of camp as a lookout point. He made friends with Canadian farmers who supplied him with lumber and tools to build. Moriyama describes his experience of finding escape as such:

In despair, I decided to bathe in the Slocan River on the other side of a little mountain away from the camp. The water was glacial, but it was better than hot tears. To see who might be coming, I built an observation platform. Soon I found myself wanting to build my first architectural project, a tree house, without being found out by the RCMP. I used just an axe as a hammer, an old borrowed saw, six spikes, some nails, a rope, and mostly branches and scraps from the lumberyard. It was hard work building it by myself, and it was a lesson in economy of material and means

That tree house, when finished, was beautiful. It was my university, my place of solace, a place to think and learn.

After the war, his family reunited with his father and they resettled in Hamilton, Ontario, where he attended Westdale Secondary School and worked in a pottery factory. Ambidextrous, Moriyama was able to finish his piecework quickly, and his bosses allowed him to use his extra time to study for school.

During his years in university, Moriyama ran into his childhood friend Sachi from Vancouver, and the two began dating. They married in 1954, and together had five children, including two sons who also become architects, Ajon and Jason Moriyama.

Moriyama received a Bachelor of Architecture degree from the University of Toronto in 1954, and a Master of Architecture degree in civic and town planning from the School of Architecture at McGill University in 1957.

After he retired in 2003, Moriyama's sons, Ajon and Jason, became principals at Moriyama & Teshima Architects. In 2013, Ajon Moriyama founded Ajon Moriyama Architect, which takes on independent work in Toronto.

== Career ==
Moriyama's first large project as an independent architect was the Ontario Science Centre in Toronto, with design starting in 1964, the building being finished in 1969.

After years of working independently as an architect, Moriyama established his Toronto-based firm in 1958 and in 1970 was joined by Ted Teshima and is now Moriyama & Teshima Architects. Some of their notable early projects include the Scarborough Civic Centre from 1973, and the Metropolitan Toronto Reference Library from 1977. Both of these projects won Governor General's Medals. Moriyama has been heavily involved in bringing a Japanese cultural influence to Western society. He is a part of the Japanese Order of the Rising Sun, as well as the Order of Ontario. Many of Moriyama's architectural awards recognize his excellency in materiality, landscape, and urban design. Some of his core values as an architect involve the principles of designing for human scale and human functionality. Ted Teshima retired in 2006, and died in 2016.

In 1999, Moriyama was the key architect for designing of the National Museum of Saudi Arabia in Riyadh.

From 2001 to 2007, Moriyama served as the Chancellor of Brock University in St Catharines, Ontario. He has designed several buildings at Brock University from the 1970s onwards.

In 2012 he created a $200,000 endowment with the Royal Architectural Institute of Canada called the Moriyama RAIC International Prize.

Moriyama retired in 2003. He died in Toronto on September 1, 2023, at the age of 93.

== Honours ==
In 1985, Moriyama was made an Officer of the Order of Canada (OC) and promoted to Companion of the same order (CC) in 2008. He was also inducted into the Order of Ontario in 1992.

In 1997, he received the RAIC Gold Medal, Canadian Architecture's highest honour.

In 2003, Moriyama was made a member of the Order of the Rising Sun, 4th class, a Japanese award given in recognition for his services to Japanese culture in Canada.

In 2007, he was honoured with a postage stamp by Canada Post featuring his design for the Ontario Science Centre.

In 2009, Moriyama was one of nine laureates to receive a Governor General's Award in Visual and Media Arts.

In 2010, he won the Sakura Award, for his impact and dedication in the promotion of Japanese culture worldwide.

In 2012, Moriyama received a Queen Elizabeth II Diamond Jubilee Medal. He also created a $200,000 endowment with the Royal Architectural Institute of Canada called the Moriyama RAIC International Prize.

In June 2013, Moriyama received an honorary doctorate from the University of Calgary.

== Notable projects ==
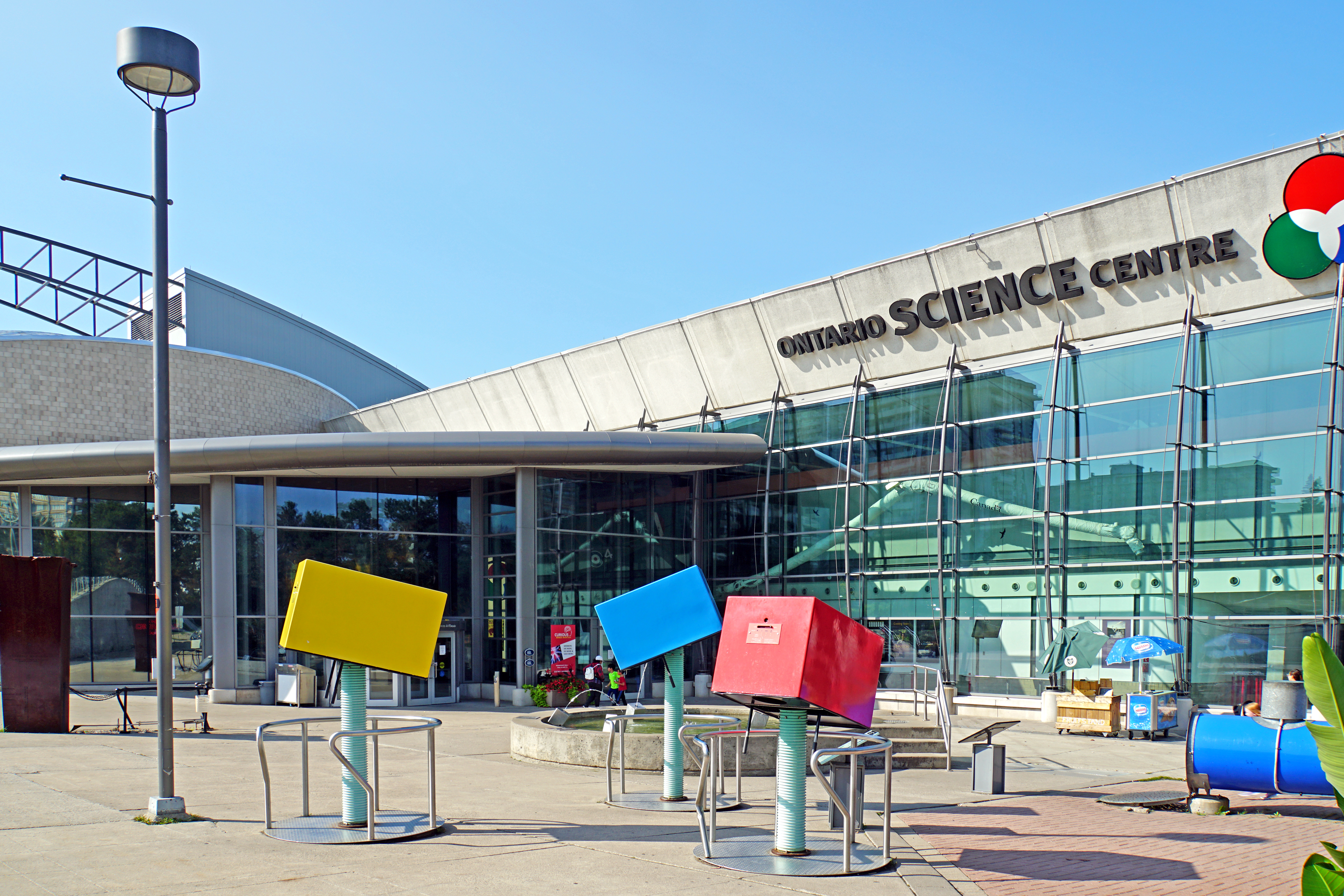
Ontario Science Centre in Toronto, Ontario.

=== Ontario Science Centre, Toronto ===
The Ontario Science Centre was Moriyama's first large-scale project as an independent architect. Until its closure in June 2024 it functioned as a place for visitors to experiment hands-on with installations. He had it built in 1969, incorporating Confuciuan philosophies into the design, building on the ideas of tactile and experiential learning.

The glass facade of the front entrance had a large, exposed steel cable structure. This immediately involved visitors experiencing the engineering and science behind architecture, an example of experiential learning in itself. The interior leant itself to flexibility, with large open spaces fit for various installations, exhibits, and large crowds.

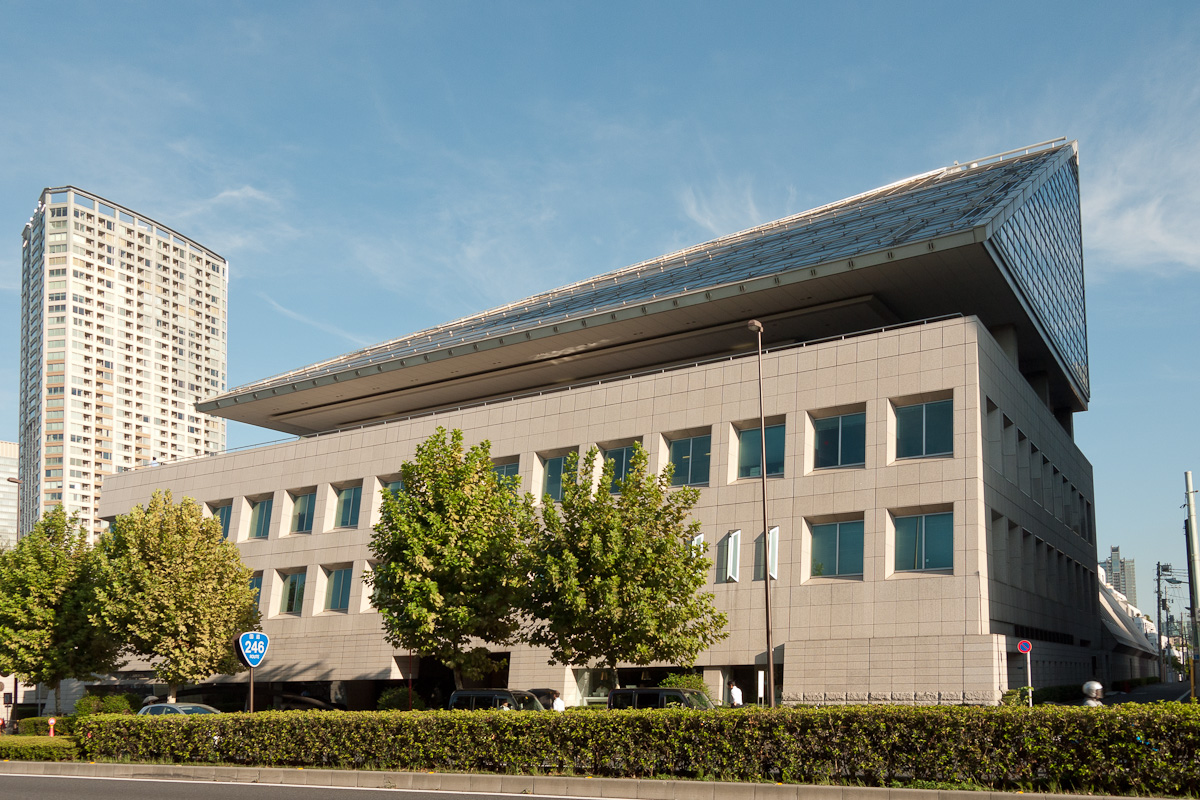
The Canadian Embassy in Akasaka, Tokyo, Japan.

=== Canadian embassy, Tokyo ===
Moriyama designed the Canadian embassy in Tokyo during his time with Moriyama & Teshima. Built in 1991, the prominent concept of this building is the "tree house", inspired by Moriyama childhood years spent in Japanese internment camps. His intention was to enable a place of social connection and welcoming for all those visiting the Embassy: Moriyama replicated the feeling of youthfulness and magic of the treehouse he first built while in camp. Its form resembles that of a temple. On the lower half, a large solid mass of concrete includes deep set windows, and above it, an asymmetrical glass peaked roof creates a light, sculptural contrast. Adjacent to the building is the Akasaka Imperial Grounds and the Takahashi Memorial Park. The building was limited in the amount of shadows it was allowed to cast over the park, a restriction that led to its final shape.

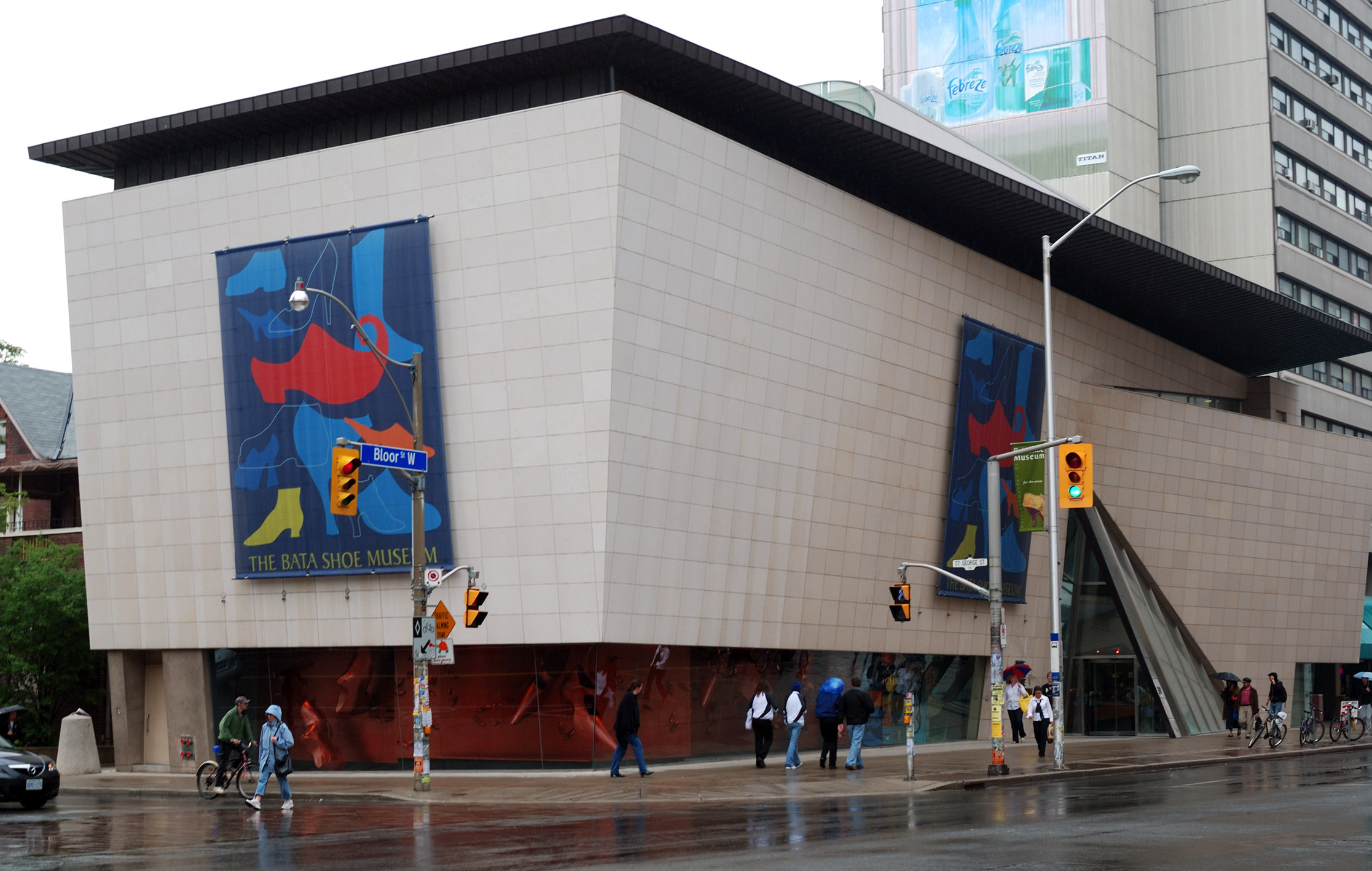
The Bata Shoe Museum in Toronto, Ontario

=== Bata Shoe Museum, Toronto ===
Moriyama & Teshima designed the Bata Shoe Museum. Built in 1995, it is recognizable by its angled trapezoidal limestone walls, and pyramid-like glazing on the front face. Its interior reflects the angularity of the outside, with large open spaces for exhibitions with tilted walls; this interior is mostly wood, with "floating" display boxes using hidden supports, similar to the grand wooden staircase in the room's centre.

This project won the City of Toronto Urban Design Award of Excellence in 1997.

== Other projects ==
- Limberlost Place, George Brown College (2022)
- Canadian Port of Entry at the Gordie Howe International Border Crossing, Gordie Howe International Bridge (under construction as of 2022)
- Toronto French School additions (2015)
- Canadian War Museum (2005)
- National Museum of Saudi Arabia in Riyadh (1999)
- Seneca College's Seneca@York campus Stephen E. Quinlan Building in Toronto (1999)
- John Labatt Visual Arts Centre, The University of Western Ontario, London, Ontario (1993)
- Ottawa City Hall (1990)
- North York Central Library (1987)
- Canada Centre Building (1985)
- Whitby Town Hall, Whitby, Ontario (1975)
- Science North, Sudbury, Ontario (1984)
- Museum London in London, Ontario (1980)
- Peterborough Public Library, Peterborough, Ontario (1980)
- Toronto Reference Library (1977)
- Lester B. Pearson Collegiate Institute (1977)
- Albert Campbell Collegiate Institute (1976)
- Burnhamthorpe Library and Burnhamthorphe Library Theatre (now Maja Prentice Theatre), Mississauga (1976)
- Scarborough Civic Centre (1973)
- William G. Davis Building, University of Toronto Mississauga (1973)
- L'Amoreaux Collegiate Institute (1971)
- John McCrae Senior Public School, Scarborough, Ontario (1969)
- Health Services Building, University of Waterloo (1968)
- Minota Hagey Residence, University of Waterloo (1968) (Ontario Masons' Council Relations Award)
- Harvest Bible Chapel, Markham (1967)
- Civic Garden Centre (now Toronto Botanical Garden), Toronto (1965)
- Japanese Canadian Cultural Centre (1963)
- Japanese Tea House and Used Equipment Centre a 28 Valleyanna Drive, Toronto (1960, only tea house remains)

== Gallery ==
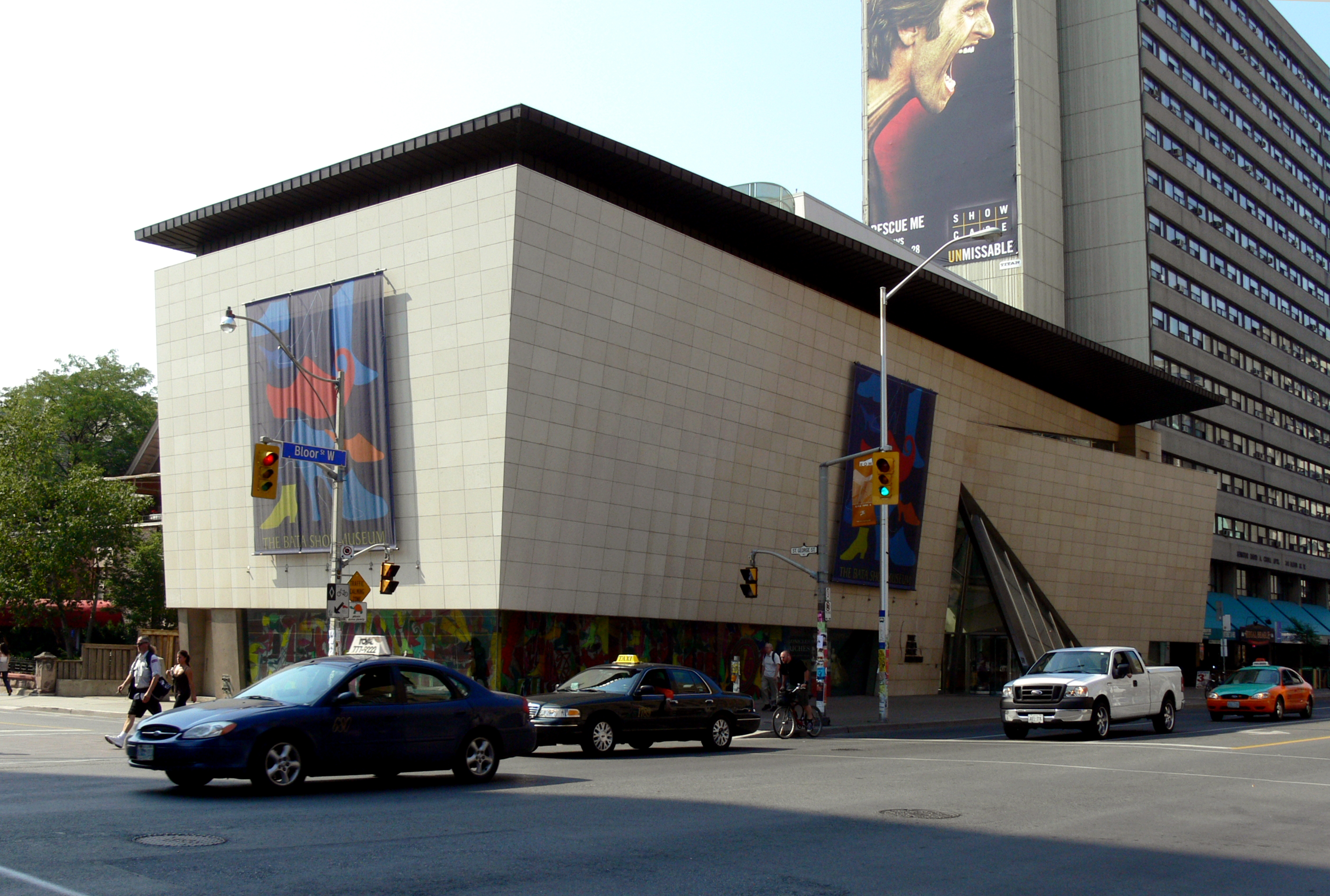
Bata Shoe Museum, (1991) Toronto, Ontario

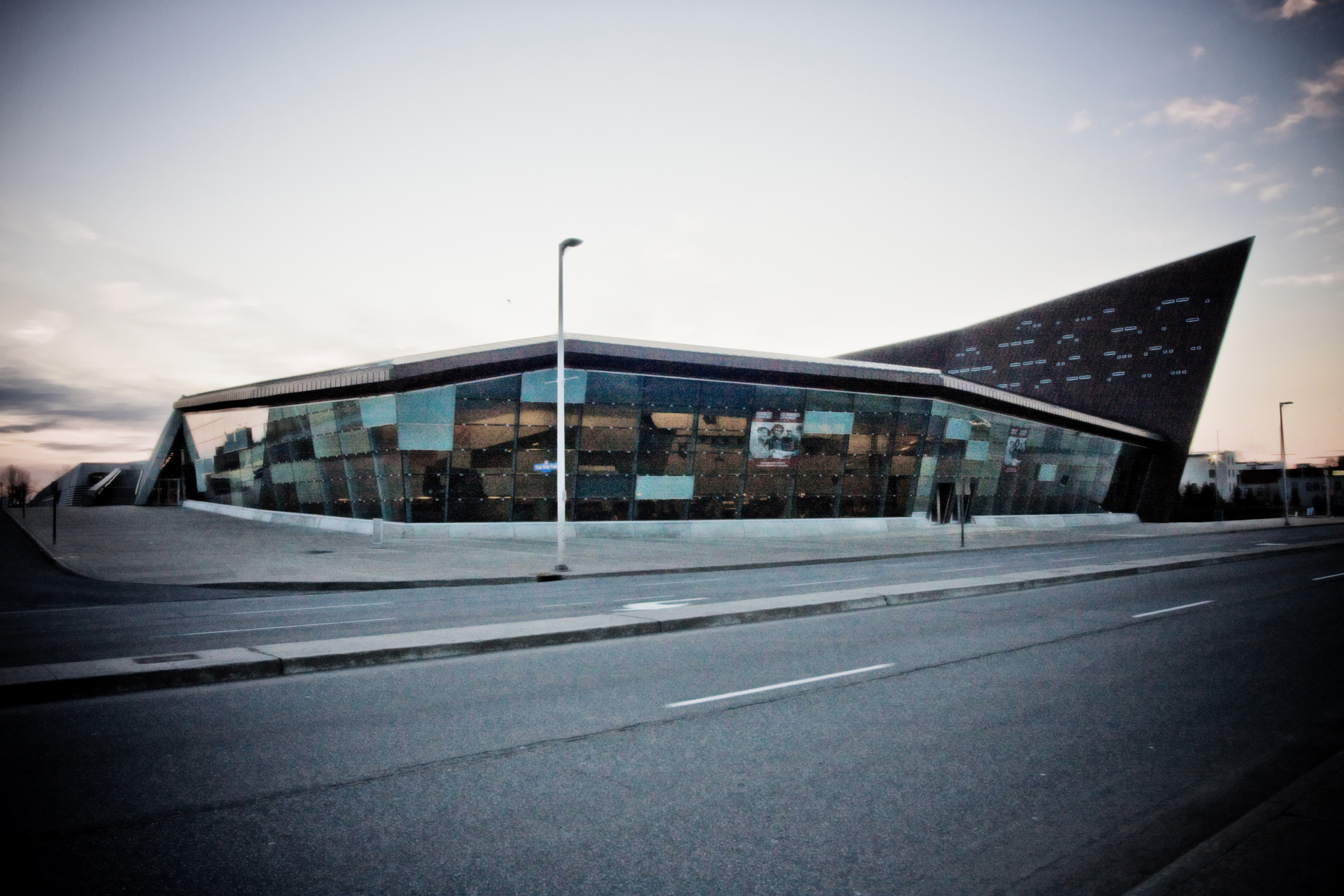
Canadian War Museum Ottawa (2005)

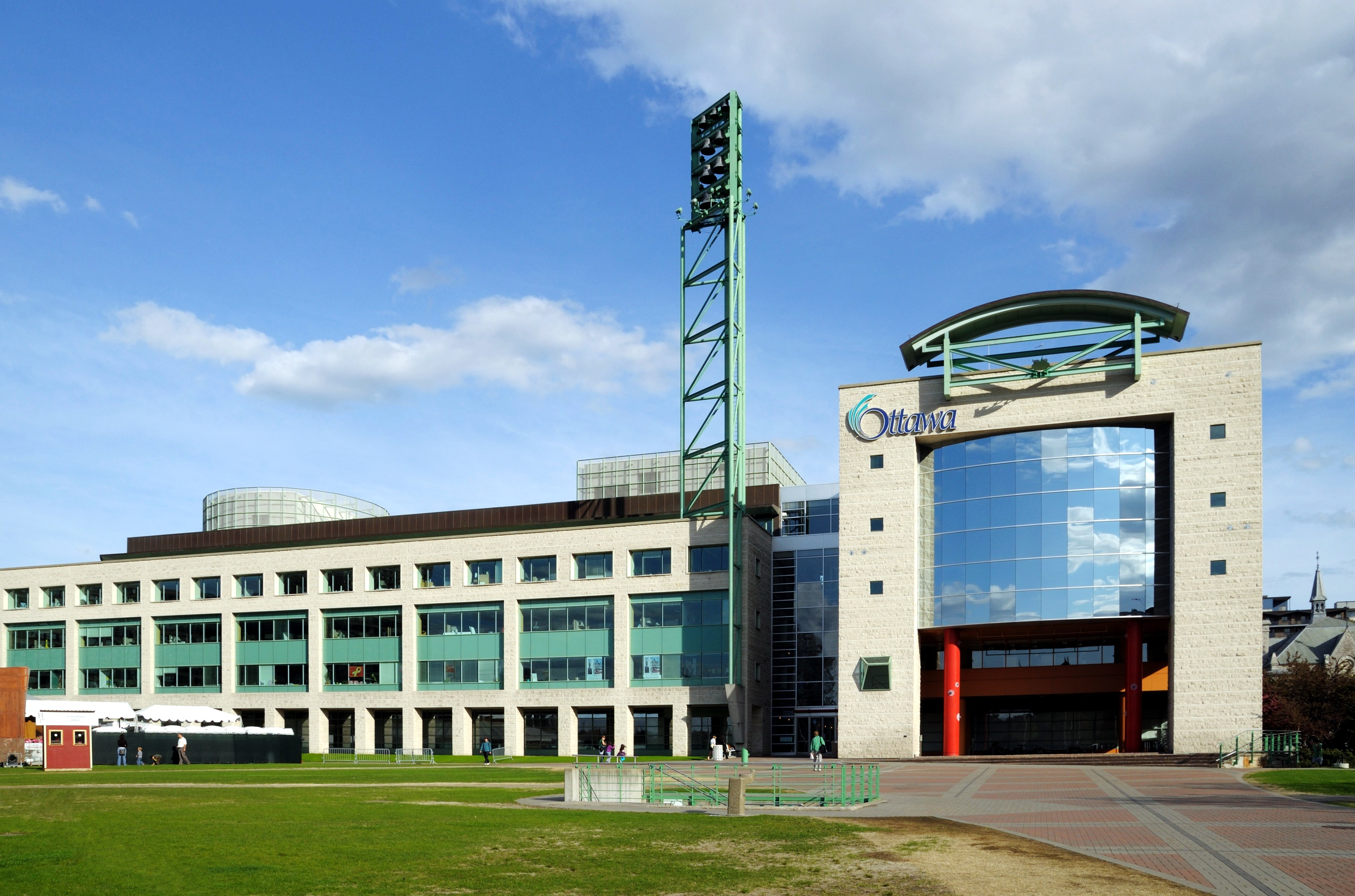
Ottawa City Hall (1990)

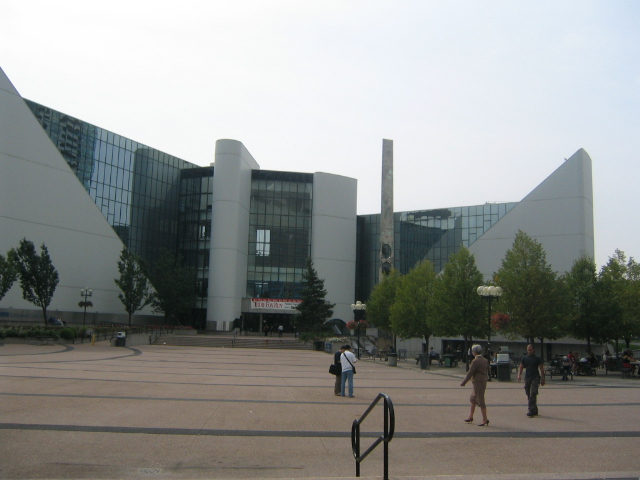
Scarborough Civic Centre (1973), Scarborough, Ontario

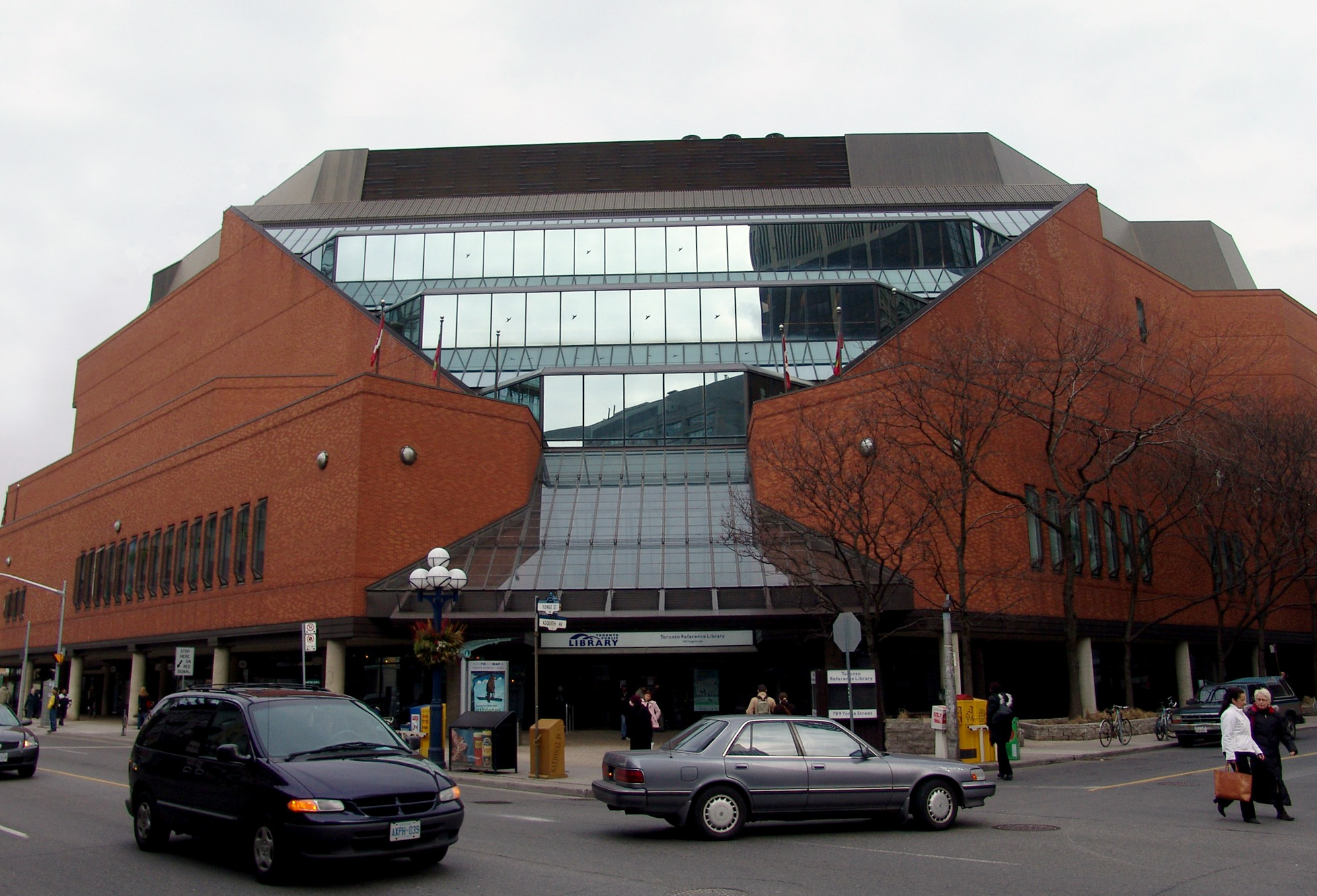
Toronto Reference Library (1977)

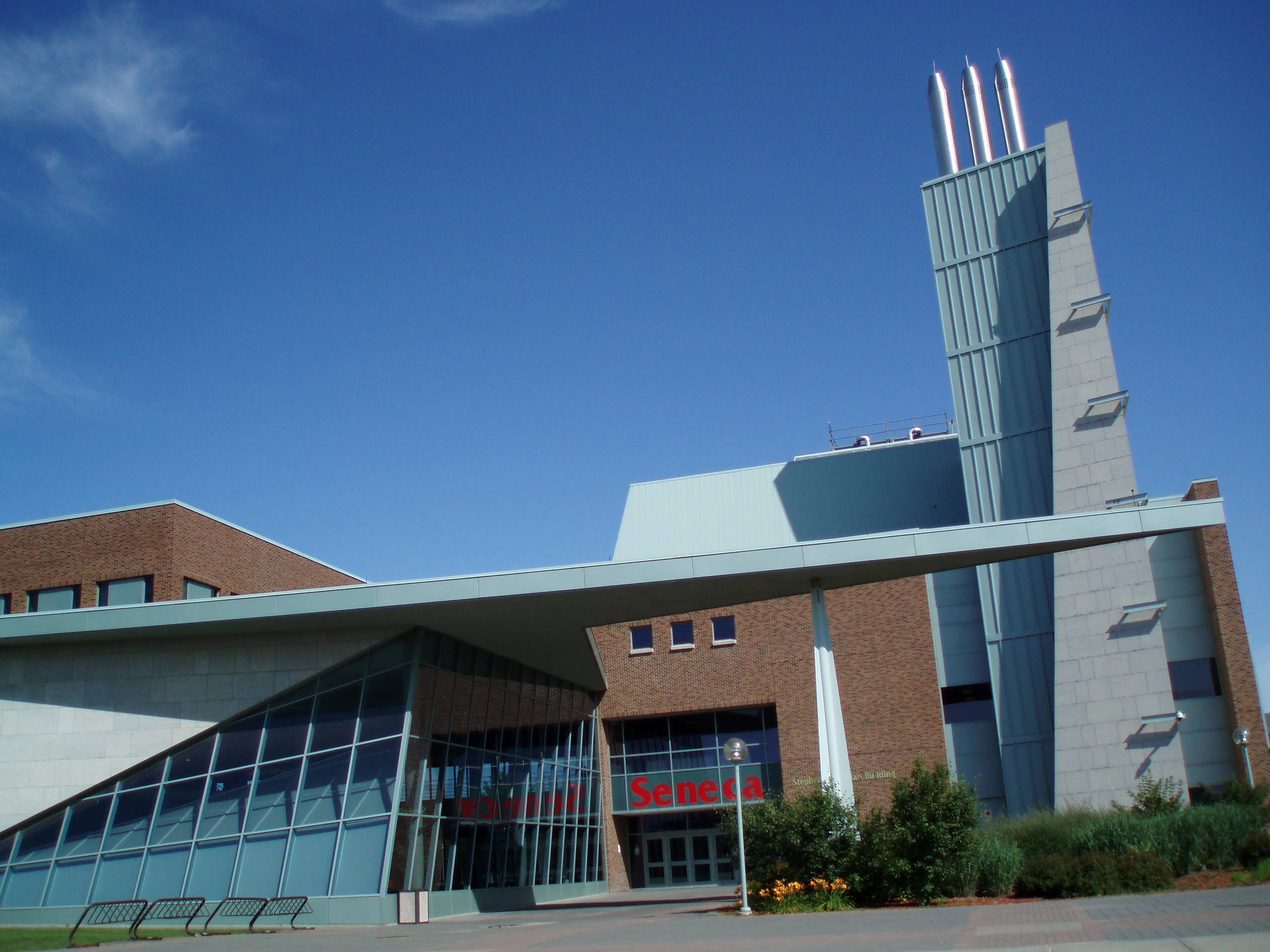
Seneca@York Campus, Toronto (1999)

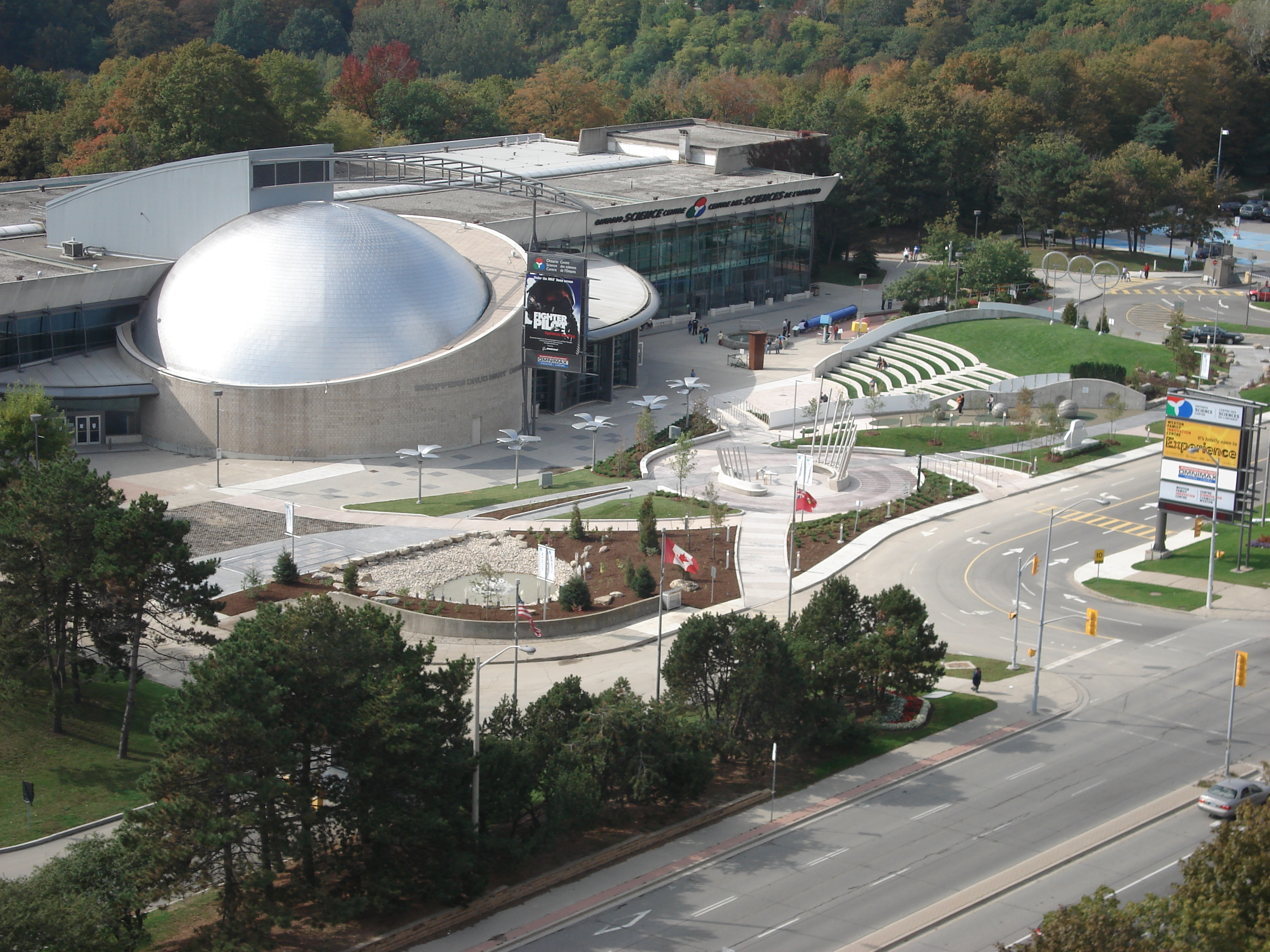
Ontario Science Centre, Toronto (1964)

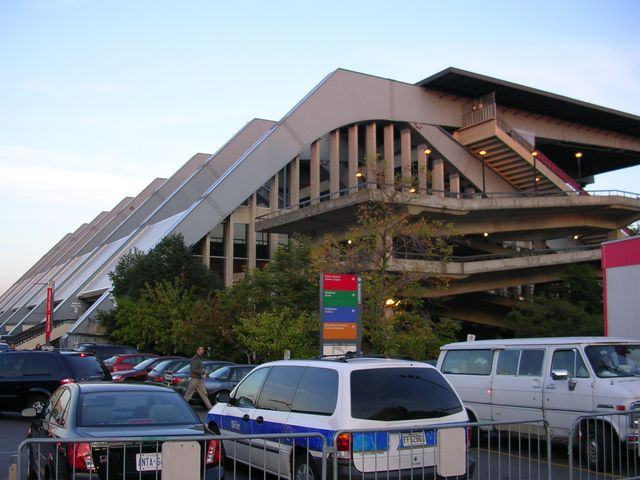
Ottawa Civic Centre (1968)

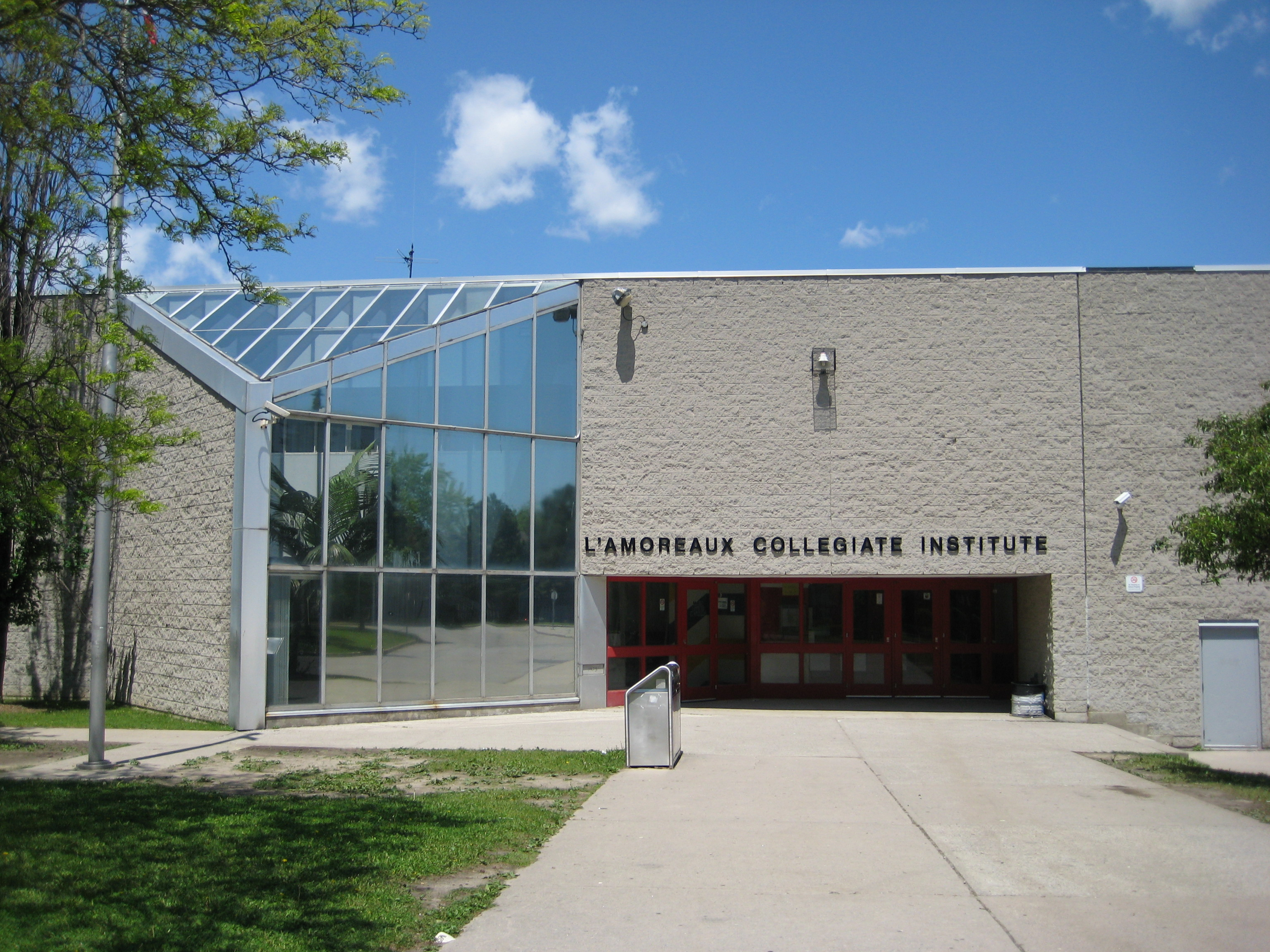
L'Amoreaux Collegiate Institute Scarborough, Ontario, (1973)

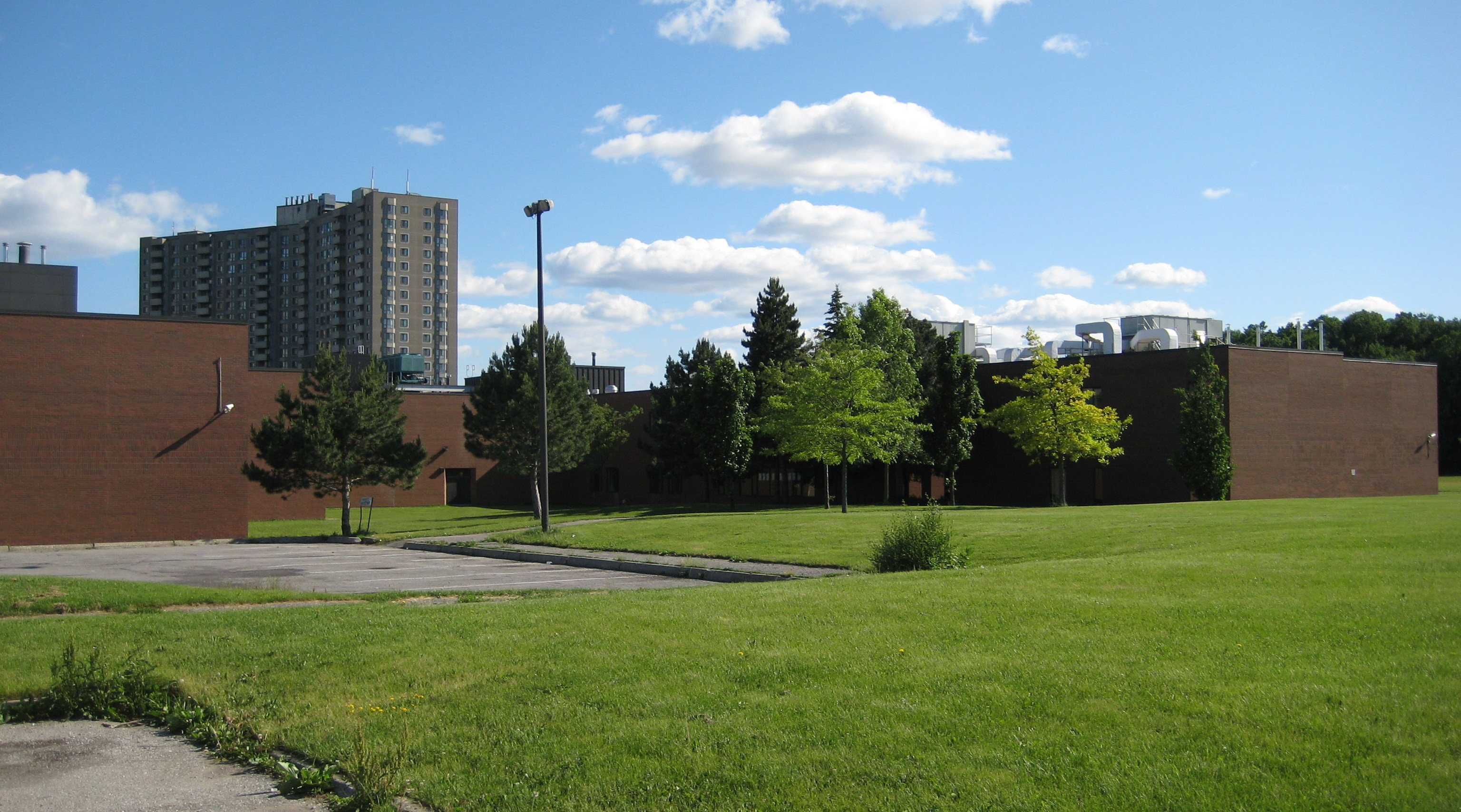
Albert Campbell Collegiate Institute Scarborough, Ontario, (1976)

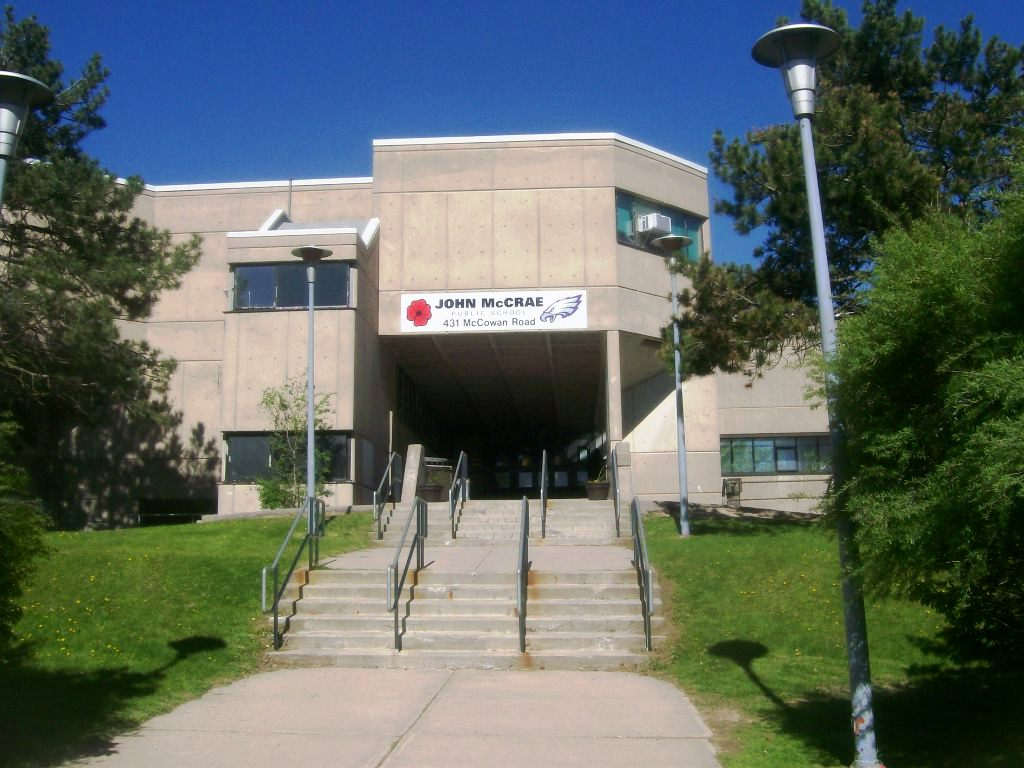
John McCrae (Senior) Public School Scarborough, Ontario, (1969)

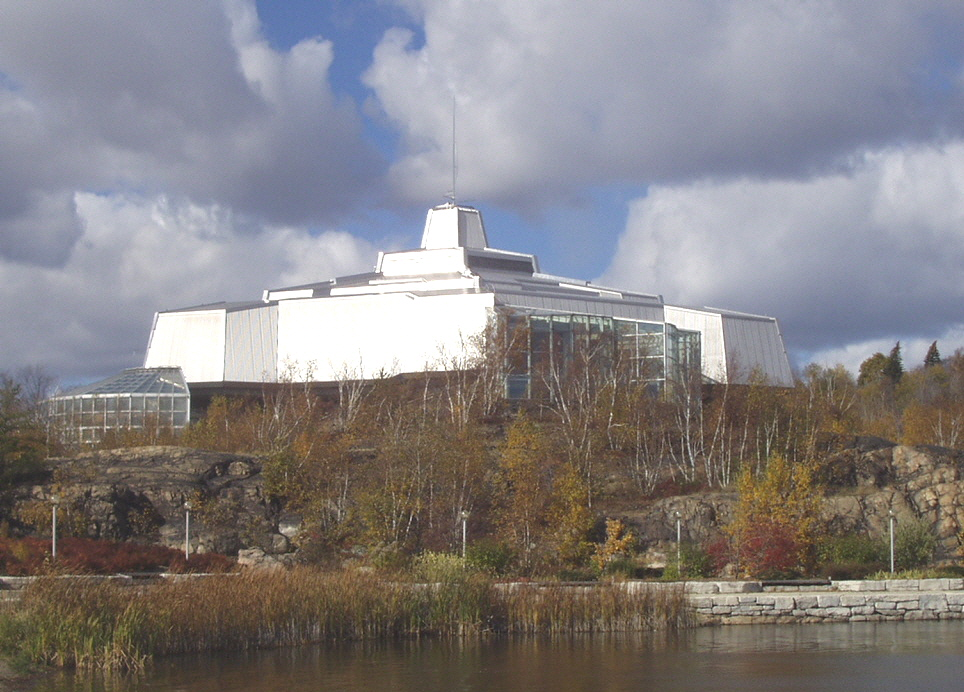
Science North in Sudbury, Ontario, (1980)

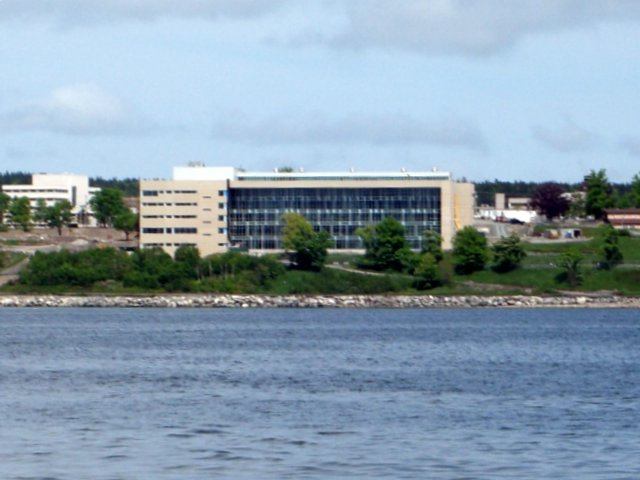
Nova Scotia Community College Waterfront Campus (with Barrie and Langille Architects)

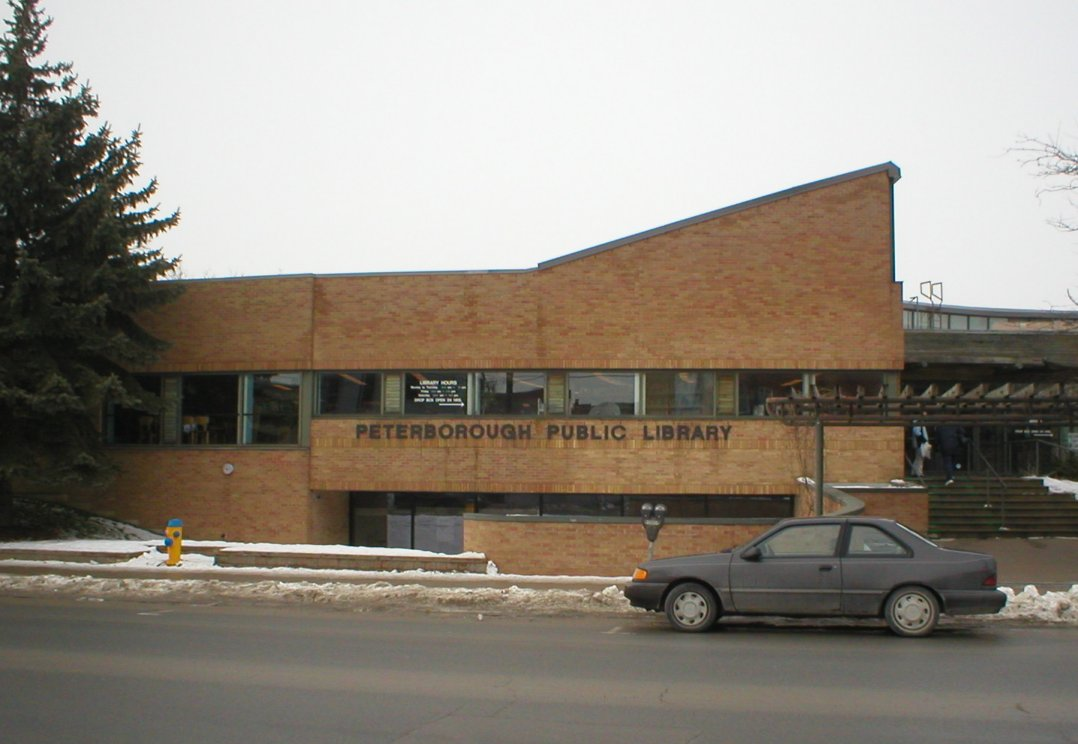
Peterborough Public Library, (1980) Peterborough, Ontario

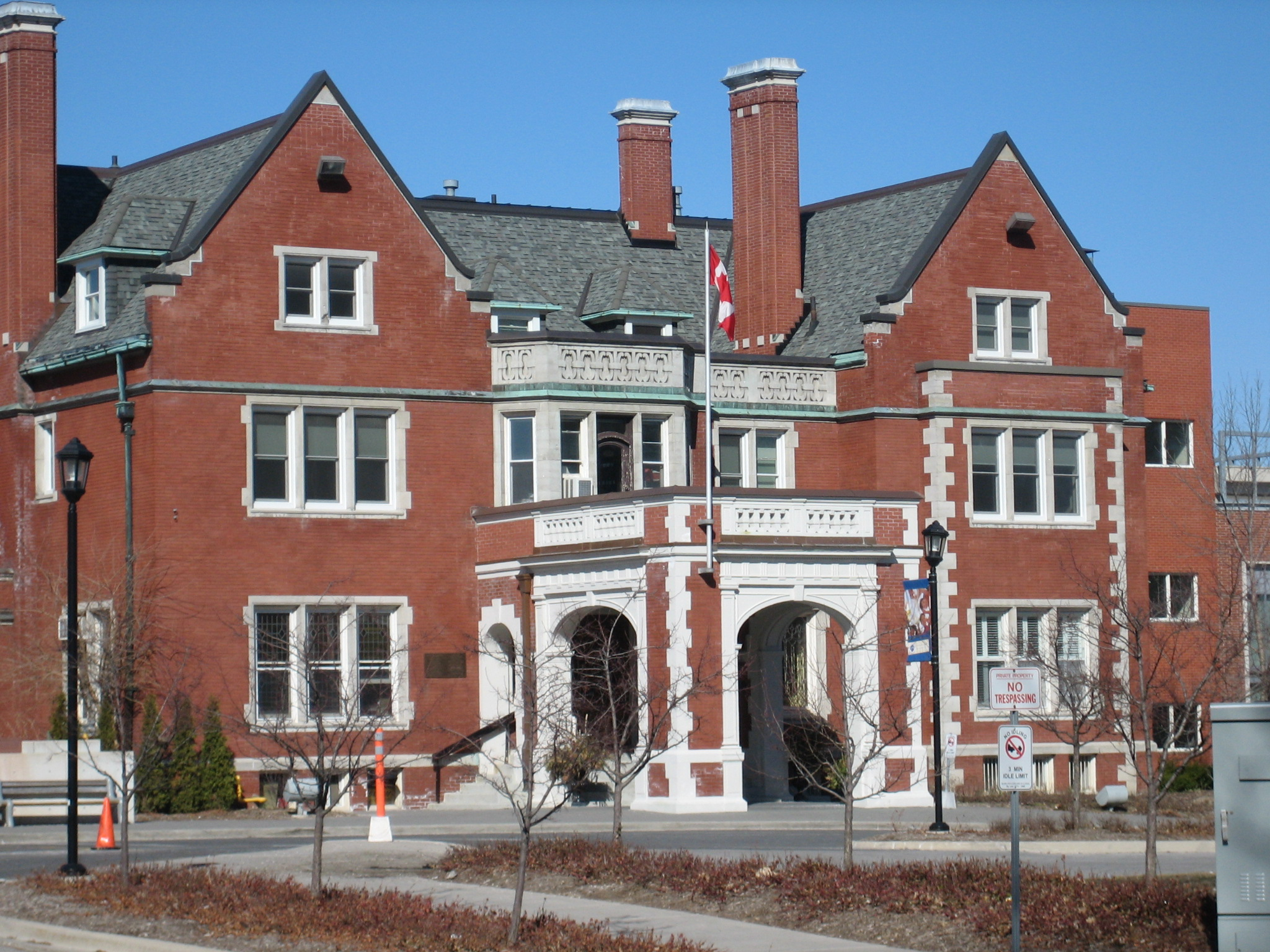
Toronto French School - new additions

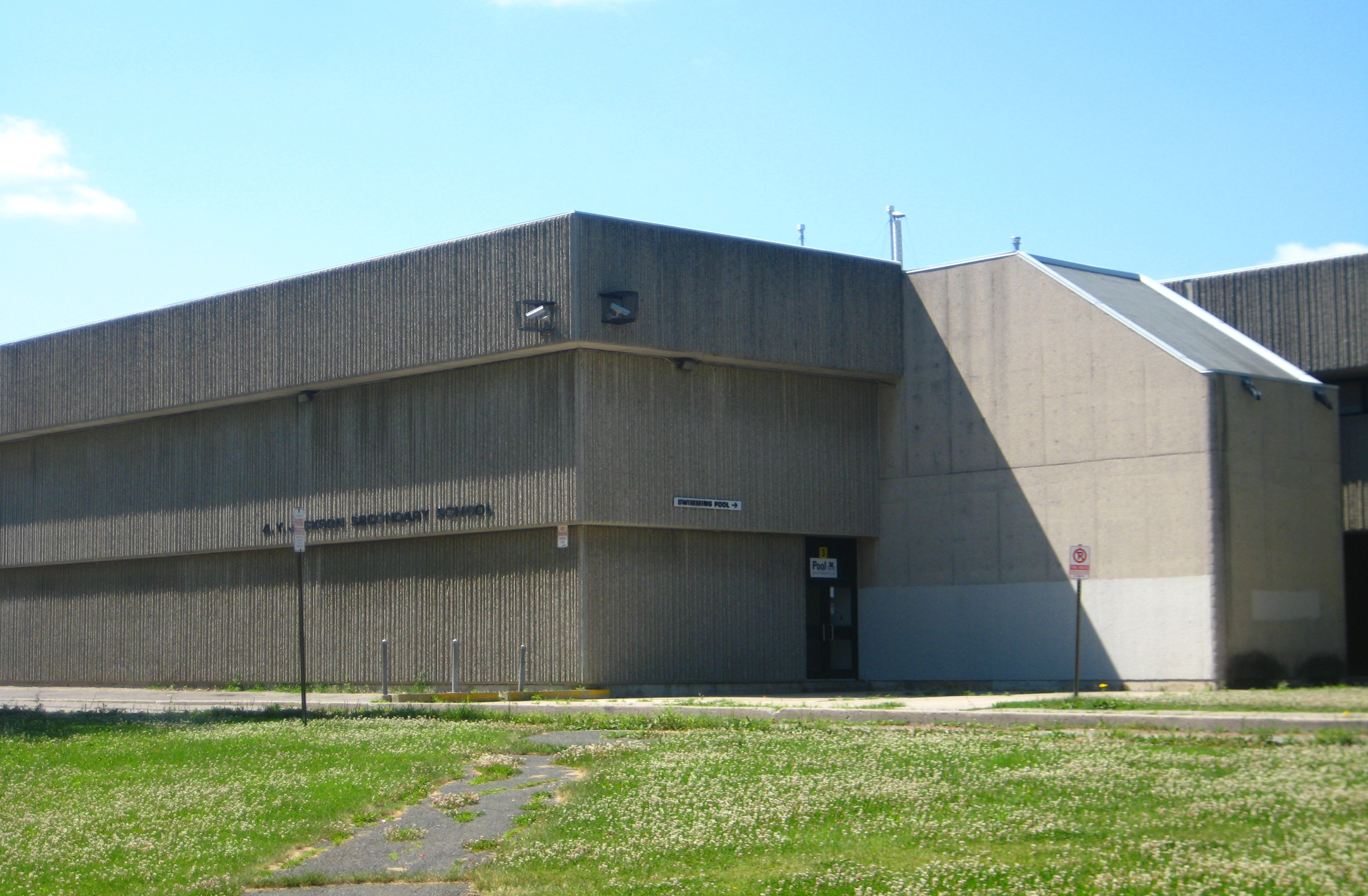
A.Y. Jackson Secondary School, (1970) North York, Ontario
