= Zabeen Hirji =

Tanzanian-Canadian banker (born 1960)

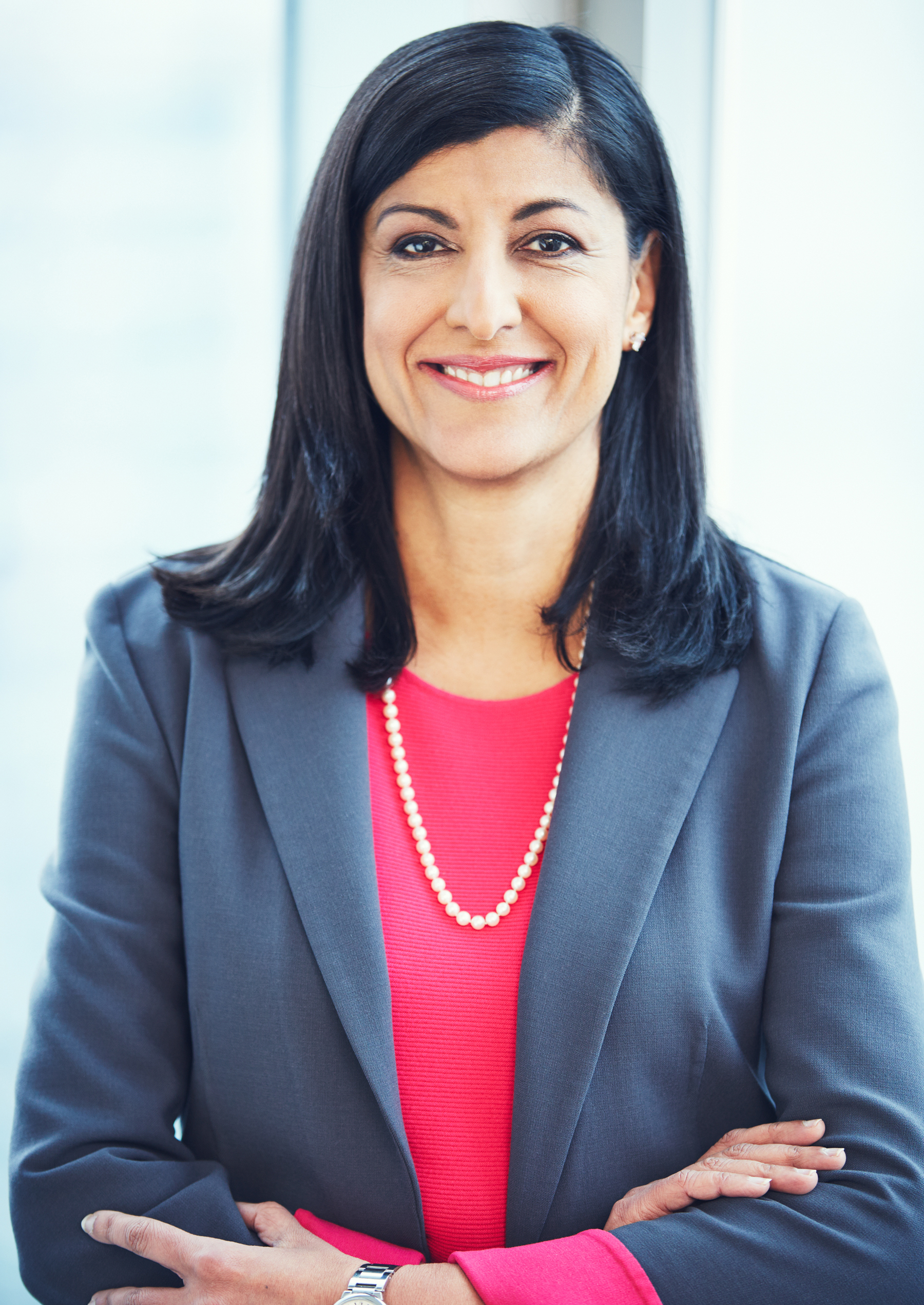
- Zabeen Hirji in 2015
- Born: 1960 (age 64–65); Tanganyika Territory (present-day Tanzania)
- Education: MBA, Simon Fraser University
- Occupation(s): Chief Human Resources Officer, RBC 2007-2017
- Years active: Purposeful Next Act 2018 - present
- Employer: Royal Bank of Canada
- Spouse: Dr. Mark Nowaczynski (1986 - 2013)
- Website: Zabeen Hirji Official Website

Zabeen Hirji (born 1960) is a former Chief Human Resources Officer (CHRO) and a former member of the Royal Bank of Canada (RBC) Group Executive in Toronto from 2007 to 2017.

A native of Tanzania, she immigrated to Vancouver in 1974 and began working at the RBC as a teller in 1977. Hirji held a variety of positions across different departments and became CHRO in 2007.

Hirji is an advocate and spokesperson for diversity and inclusion in Canadian business.

== Early life and education ==
Zabeen Hirji was born in Tanzania to parents of Indian and South Asian origin. Her father died in an automobile accident. She immigrated with her mother to Vancouver, Canada when she was 14. She earned her MBA at Simon Fraser University, British Columbia in 1994, submitting the thesis, "A Strategic Analysis of a Toronto Family Medicine Practice". In 1997, she completed the Advanced Human Resources Executive Program at the Ross School of Business, University of Michigan.

== Career ==
Hirji began working for the Royal Bank of Canada as a teller while attending university part-time in 1977. Over the next two decades, she advanced in positions in retail banking, training, operations, credit card operations, and human resources.

From 1994 to 1997, she was the Regional Manager of Card Services for Central Canada. In 1997, she was appointed vice president of human resources, and in 2001, she became senior vice president.

In 2007, she was promoted to Executive Vice President and Chief Human Resources Officer, giving her global responsibility for nearly 79,000 employees in 50 countries. Along with senior management, she developed initiatives to increase diversity and inclusion in hiring and talent management. She also became responsible for branding, communications, and corporate citizenship.

=== Diversity advocate ===
In 2001, Hirji led the founding of the RBC's Diversity Leadership Council, a global initiative that brings together senior business executives from many fields. Hirji introduced a Diversity Dialogues Reciprocal Mentoring Program, which pairs senior managers with junior employees from minority backgrounds for mutual encouragement, as well as "hidden bias" training. According to Hirji, the RBC "actively targets recent immigrants, women entrepreneurs, Canadian Aboriginals, the gay and lesbian community and people with disabilities".

== Affiliations ==
She is a fellow of the Institute of Canadian Bankers, a co-chair of the Toronto Region Immigrant Employment Council, director of Greater Toronto CivicAction Alliance, director of the Mosaic Institute, and a member of the DiverseCity Steering Committee. In 2005, she was named a fellow of Centennial College.

== Honors and awards ==
Hirji was listed in the 2001 edition of Who's Who in Canadian Business and the 2009 edition of Canadian Who's Who.

In 2010, she was honored as Corporate Executive of the Year by the Indo-Canada Chamber of Commerce.

Hirji was named one of the Top 25 Women of Influence by the Women of Influence organization in 2011 and 2014. She was inducted into that organization's Canada's Most Powerful Women: Top 100 Hall of Fame in 2012.

In 2014, she received the Catalyst Canada honour for her work championing the advancement of women and minorities in Canadian business.

In 2016, Hirji was granted Canada's Meritorious Service Medal for advancing diversity and inclusion, and the Outstanding Alumni Award for Professional Achievement from Simon Fraser University.

In 2017, she received the Ivey Business School Lifetime Achievement Award in HR Industry by Canadian HR Awards.

In 2025, Hirji received an Honorary Doctor of Laws Degree from Trent University.
