= Margaret M. Risk =

Canadian nurse

Margaret M. Risk is a Canadian nurse who was awarded The Order of Ontario in 2000.

Created in 1986 by Ontario's then Lieutenant Governor Lincoln Alexander, the award is the most prestigious official honour in the province. The Order recognizes the highest level of individual excellence and achievement in any field, but is not awarded for acts of bravery.

Risk died on September 27th, 2026, at the age of 90.
