= Trisha Romance =

Canadian painter and illustrator

- Trisha Romance
- Born: 1951 (age 74–75); Hamburg, New York
- Education: Sheridan College
- Known for: painting, illustration
- Movement: Americana, American scene painting
- Spouse: Gary Peterson
- Awards: Order of Ontario, Canadian Artist of the Year
- Website: TrishaRomance.com

Trisha Romance is an American-born Canadian painter and illustrator of popular realistic and idyllic subjects.

== Works ==
Romance's work commonly features domestic settings, family events, and holiday scenes, "ideal[s] in family life", reminiscent of artists in the American Scene Painting tradition.

She showed her first work, "Speaking of Spring" work in 1978.

An oversize book of her illustrations, The World of Trisha Romance, was published by Studio, a Penguin imprint, in 1992. It contains 130 full-color reproductions of Romance's paintings, many of which had not previously been published. She is also the author of A Star for Christmas, a children's book published in 2007 by Tundra Press.

Many of Romance's works are available as reproduction prints using the giclée process, and on posters and collectible plates.

=== Romance Inn project ===
In 2010, Romance proposed creating the Romance Inn on the grounds of the former Randwood estate in Niagara-on-the-Lake, which would consist of a 100-room lodging facility and restaurant, as well as a cultural centre with studio space available where "guests may explore their creative talents and be inspired by their own creations". The proposal met with some opposition from local residents, and evenly divided the town council — the proposal only received approval when the mayor cast the deciding vote in favour. Though the plan was approved, the project never got off the ground.

== Awards, honors, and media appearances ==
Romance is a member of the Order of Ontario (since 1996), the province's highest honour. She also is a winner of the Canadian Artist of the Year Award in 1995, 1996, 1997, and 1998.

She carried the Olympic Torch through Niagara-on-the-Lake during the relay leading up to the 2010 Winter Olympics in Vancouver, British Columbia.

Romance has been featured on Fred Anderton's "You Asked" series on CHCH News, on 100 Huntley Street's Full Circle, and on 'Person 2 Person with Paula Todd', a TV Ontario interview program.

== Personal life ==
Romance was born in Hamburg, New York in 1951.

She moved to Canada in 1969 to attend Sheridan College in Oakville, Ontario, where she received a degree in design and illustration.

Along with her children and her husband, Gary Peterson, who is also her manager and promoter, Romance lives in Niagara-On-The-Lake in Southern Ontario, Canada, where she also maintains a gallery of her works.
