= Anna Banerji =

Canadian academic + doctor

Anna Banerji M.D. O. Ont.
- Education: University of Toronto; Harvard School of Public Health McGill University Ottawa University
- Occupations: Infectious and tropical disease physician; pediatrician; public health specialist
- Organization(s): Founder and chair, North American Refugee Health Conference (Canadian), founder and chair, Indigenous Health Conference
- Known for: COVID-19 commentary in Canadian news, advocacy for Indigenous and refugee populations
- Honours: Order of Ontario, 2012; Diamond Jubilee Medal, 2012 Peter Henderson Bryce Award 2019

Anna Banerji M.D., O. Ont. is a Toronto infectious disease doctor, tropical disease specialist, pediatrician, public health specialist, academic, and activist. She is the founder and chair of both the North American Refugee Health Conference in Canada and the Indigenous Health Conference, and the co-founder of the Society of Refugee Healthcare Providers. She was awarded the Dr Peter Bryce Henderson for her advocacy for Indigenous children.

== Education ==
Banerji studied Arts and Science at the University of Toronto from 1983 to 1985. In 1989, she graduated from the University of Toronto as a Doctor of Medicine. She completed a pediatric residency at Children's Hospital of Eastern Ontario, University of Ottawa from 1992 to 1995, then Infectious Diseases at McGill University from 1995 to 1997. Subsequently she completed a clinical research fellowship while studying Tropical Medicine in 1998.

She obtained a Masters of Public Health from Harvard School of Public Health in 2003, where she was selected as promising graduate to represent HSPH for the Harvard Gazette for the class of 2003.

== Academic career ==
From 2007 to 2016, Banerji was an assistant professor at University of Toronto's Faculty of Medicine, specialising in infectious and tropical disease and pediatrics. She is currently an associate professor at both the University of Toronto's Dalla Lana School of Public Health and the University of Toronto's Temerty Faculty of Medicine.

She has spent almost three decades advocating for equity for Indigenous children, including the RSV antibody palivizumab, and for better housing, access to clean water and solutions to food insecurity. Banerji published a series of papers that showed that infants in Nunavut have the highest global rate of Respiratory syncytial virus (RSV). She did economic analyses to show that it was cheaper to give the RSV antibody palivizumab than to pay for hospitalization. Following a petition ("Provide #FairMedicine to protect Inuit babies from RSV deaths") with almost a quarter of a million signatures at change.org, the National Advisory Committee on Immunization’s (NACI) decided to recognize the increased risk for RSV admissions among Indigenous infants and prioritize them for the vaccine.

Banerji has been working with refugee populations for most of her career, and created refugee children's clinics when there was a surge of Syrian refugees and more recently Afghan refugees. She is the founder and chair of the North American Refugee Health Conference in Canada, which occurs on alternate years. She is the co-founder of the Society of Refugee Healthcare Providers, and was the first chair of the board from 2015 to 2022. She is the founding Executive Director of the new not-for-profit North American Refugee Health Conference Inc.

== Advocacy ==
Throughout the COVID-19 pandemic Banerji was regularly quoted in Canadian media speaking about the connections between COVID-19 and child mental health, how to safely navigate family gatherings, the importance of COVID-19 vaccines, COVID-19 vaccine mandates, and the need for better public policy. She was very involved in addressing COVID-19 in Indigenous communities in Ontario, including petitioning for more resources, being part of the Nishnawabe Aski Nation Covid-19 Task-force, and spending five weeks vaccinating First Nations Indigenous youth in Northern Ontario.

She was the recipient of the Dr. Peter Henderson Bryce Award in 2019.

In addition to being a physician and an human rights advocate, Banerji used to be a clown during medical school, and has made animal balloons for children around the world including in Africa, Haiti after the earthquake, and recently in remote First Nations communities. She is commonly referred to as "Dr. Balloon".

== Awards ==
- Top 25 Women of Influence, 2024
- Order of Ontario, 2012
- Diamond Jubilee Medal, 2012
- Ontario Pediatrician of the Year, as selected by the Ontario Pediatric Alliance 2022
- Arbor Award, University of Toronto 2022
- Pillars of the Pandemic Award 2022
- Dr. Peter Henderson Bryce Award by the First Nations Child & Family Caring Society 2019

== Family ==
Banerji has a daughter who was born in 2000. She adopted a son from Nunavut, Nathan Banerji-Kearney, who died in 2018 by suicide, aged 14. Banerji, with friends, set up two scholarships in her son's name for Indigenous medical students, and has advocated for improving access to mental health services, especially for Indigenous youth.
