= Marion Anderson (politician) =

Canadian politician

Marion Anderson O.Ont
- Born: c. 1914
- Occupation: politician
- Awards: Order of Ontario

Marion Anderson, O.Ont (born c. 1914, date of death unknown) was a Canadian politician. In 1950, she became the first woman to serve as a First Nations band councillor in Ontario.

== Life ==
An Anisininew from the Big Trout Lake band in Kenora District, Anderson worked as a midwife and was renowned for her hunting, fishing and trapping skills. She also represented the community on the Northern Nishnawbe Education Council and walked 75 kilometres to Bearskin Lake to represent the community at meetings.

== Awards ==
Anderson was awarded the Order of Ontario in 1998.
