= Jim Redpath =

Canadian mining engineer (1936–2025)

James Stockton Redpath (September 24, 1936 – August 2, 2025) was a Canadian mining engineer and Nipissing University's first chancellor from 1994 to 2002.

== Life and career ==
Redpath was raised in Val-d'Or, Quebec, and attended McGill University, graduating with a degree in mining engineering. He founded his engineering firm, J.S. Redpath, in 1962 in Val-d'Or, which has since evolved into an international company with billion-dollar revenue. In 1975, Redpath was awarded the Engineering Medal by the Professional Engineers Ontario.

Redpath was named Nipissing University's inaugural chancellor in 1994, a role he held until 2002.

Redpath died from complications of Parkinson's disease in St. John's, Newfoundland and Labrador, on August 2, 2025, at the age of 88.
