= Registered Nurses' Association of Ontario =

Canadian nursing organization

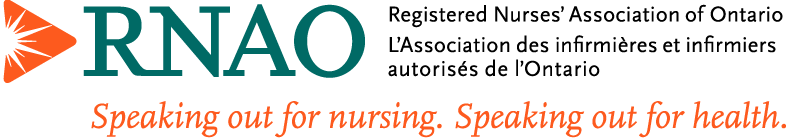

The Registered Nurses’ Association of Ontario (RNAO) is the professional association representing registered nurses, nurse practitioners and nursing students in the province of Ontario, Canada. RNAO provides a strong and credible voice for the nursing profession to influence and promote healthy public policy.

== Strategic directions ==
RNAO's strategic directions are to:

- Engage with registered nurses, nurse practitioners and undergraduate nursing students to stimulate membership and promote the value of belonging to their professional organization.
- Advance the role and image of nurses as members of a vital, knowledge-driven, caring profession, and as significant contributors to health.
- Speak out on emerging issues that impact on nurses and the nursing profession, health and health care.
- Influence healthy public policies to positively impact the determinants of health, supporting Medicare and strengthening a publicly funded, not-for-profit health-care system.

== Organizational structure ==
=== General membership ===
General membership helps determine the direction of the association through various mechanisms, including the submission, revision and passing of resolutions to the Annual General Meeting, voting on various governance issues, as well as committees, surveys, feedback, etc. The membership is composed of registered nurses, nurse practitioners, and nursing students representing all roles and areas of nursing practice.

=== Board of directors ===
The RNAO Board of Directors (BOD) operates as a policy-oriented governing board. The board governs on behalf of the association's membership and provides strategic leadership. The board sets RNAO's strategic direction through its Ends, and the resolutions passed at the Annual General Meeting.

=== The Assembly ===
The functions of the assembly are to:

- exchange information relevant to the conduct of business of the association and its chapters/regions without chapters.
- provide a regional perspective to the board of directors.
- make recommendations to the Board of Directors.

=== Geographical organization ===
RNAO is divided into 12 geographical regions, which are defined according to its bylaws. These regions promote activities focusing on issues specific to their communities. RNAO is organized in chapters/regions without chapters, which allow all members to have a voice in a democratic organization, become proactive, develop a local community and represent RNAO at the local level.

=== Interest Groups ===
RNAO's interest group structure is a vehicle for expertise in a range of clinical and/or functional aspects of health care. Interest groups concern themselves with the nursing profession from a specialty focus, and provide specialized expert input into association activities. The interest groups are ambassadors of the Home Office and the Board of Directors on specialty matters, and they allow for a two-way flow of information between members in specialty areas of the profession, and RNAO.

== Best Practice Guidelines program ==
The Best Practice Guidelines Program enables the development of evidence-based guidelines covering a variety of nursing and health-care topics, including both clinical and healthy work environment guidelines. As part of the program, RNAO has developed international partnerships in Canada, Jamaica, Chile, Colombia, Belgium, Spain, Italy, South Africa, China, and Australia to support guideline implementation, guideline evaluation and capacity building.

Clinical Best Practice Guidelines Program
The Clinical Nursing Best Practice Guidelines Program was launched in 1999 when RNAO, in partnership with the Ontario Ministry of Health and Long-Term Care, embarked on a multi-year project to develop, implement, evaluate the uptake of evidence-based guidelines. This initiative includes resources for education and support for uptake and sustainability.
Healthy Work Environments Best Practice Guidelines
In July 2003, RNAO commenced the development of evidence-based best practice guidelines aimed at creating a healthy work environment for nurses. This was achieved with funding from the Ontario Ministry of Health and Long-Term Care, working in partnership with Health Canada's Office of Nursing Policy.

=== Best Practice Spotlight Organizations (BPSOs) ===
Launched in 2003, the Best Practice Spotlight Organizations (BPSO) program supports health-care and academic organizations to implement and evaluate RNAO's best practice guidelines over a three-year period.

=== BPSO Host Model (International) ===
The RNAO BPSO host model is an extension of the BPSO Program focusing on international expansion. Generally, BPSO Hosts act as liaisons between RNAO and BPSOs in a specific country or region. The BPSO host is responsible for all aspects of the BPSO program, from selecting the BPSO organizations in their area to reporting progress back to RNAO.

=== Nursing Best Practice Research Centre (NPBRC) ===
The Nursing Best Practice Research Centre is a collaboration between researchers and educators at the University of Ottawa and RNAO. The centre strives to bring the best knowledge to nursing and health care to enhance practice and improve health and system outcomes.

== Publications and reports ==
=== SARS unmasked ===
RNAO played a central role in supporting the nursing community during the Severe Acute Respiratory Syndrome (SARS) outbreak of 2003. RNAO delivered a formal request to then Premier Ernie Eves asking the Government of Ontario to order an independent commission of inquiry under the Public Inquiries Act into the SARS outbreak. In response, Premier Eves announces an independent investigation into the outbreak, which fell short of a full public inquiry.

=== The 70 per cent Solution ===
In 2005 RNAO released The 70 per cent Solution report, which showed that government efforts to increase full-time work for RNs were starting to pay off, but the goal of having 70% of all RNs working full time would not be met without more policy changes.

=== Primary Solutions for Primary Care ===
This 2012 report lays out a blueprint to maximize and expand the role of primary care nurses.

=== Enhancing Community Care for Ontarians (ECCO) ===
First released in 2012 and next in 2014, this report called on the government to make the health system more efficient, cost-effective, and responsive to the public’s needs. To make this happen, the report asserts the health system must be anchored within primary care. Released in 2020, ECCO 3.0 provides recommendations for health system that respond to the COVID-19 pandemic, with particular emphasis on incorporating long-term care.

=== Coming Together, Moving Forward: Building the Next Chapter of Ontario’s Rural, Remote and Northern Nursing Workforce ===
In 2015, nearly two million Canadians lived in rural, remote and northern settings, yet these communities have difficulties recruiting and retaining nurses. To address the health needs of Ontarians living in these areas, RNAO created the Rural, Remote and Northern Area – Nursing Task Force. Their report was released later in the year.

=== Mind the Safety Gap in Health System Transformation: Reclaiming the Role of the RN ===
This 2016 report calls on government to create and interprofessional health human resource (HHR) plan for Ontario as Ontario moves toward a transformed health system. It contains eight recommendations for a transparent, evidence-based, and engaged process.

=== Registered Nurse Journal ===
An award-winning magazine, Registered Nurse Journal is one of very few publications in the province aimed specifically to nursing professionals.
