= George Strathy =

Canadian judge

George R. Strathy is a Canadian jurist who was the Chief Justice of Ontario from 2014 to 2022.

George R. Strathy was born in Toronto, Ontario. He graduated from the University of Toronto Faculty of Law in 1974. Before joining the bench, he worked as a litigator with a specialty in maritime law and transport law.

He was appointed to the Court of Appeal for Ontario on April 25, 2013, and he became the chief justice of Ontario on June 13, 2014. Previously, he served as a judge of the Superior Court of Justice.
