= Marlys Koschinsky =

Canadian cardiovascular researcher

- Born: 1959 (age 66–67)
- Spouse: Michael Boffa

Academic background
- Education: BSc, 1982, University of Winnipeg; PhD, Biochemistry, 1988, University of British Columbia
- Thesis: Characterization of the human ceruloplasmin cDNA and gene (1989)

Academic work
- Institutions: Robarts Research Institute; University of Windsor; Queen's University at Kingston

Marlys Laverne Koschinsky (born 1959) OOnt FCAHS is a Canadian cardiovascular researcher. As of 2015, she is the executive director at the University of Western Ontario's Robarts Research Institute. Koschinsky formally served as Dean of the Faculty of Science at the University of Windsor.

== Early life and education ==
Koschinsky was born in 1959. She graduated with her Bachelor of Science degree in 1982 from the University of Winnipeg and was subsequently awarded the Chancellor's gold medal for highest standing in the 4-year science program. Following this, Koschinsky completed her PhD in biochemistry at the University of British Columbia. In 1988, Koschinsky began her postdoctoral research in the Cardiovascular Research Group at Genentech in San Francisco.

== Career ==
Following her post-doctoral work, Koschinsky became the first female research professor at Queen's University at Kingston in biochemistry. During the 1996–97 academic year, she was the co-recipient of the Mihran and Mary Rasmajian Award for excellence in research. Throughout her tenure at Queen's, Koschinsky accepted a 5-year scholarship from the Heart and Stroke Foundation of Canada and a 10-year Career Investigator award from the Heart and Stroke Foundation of Ontario. Prior to leaving Queen's, Koschinsky served as director of the Cardiac, Circulatory & Respiratory Research Program and Head of the Department of Physiology. She eventually left to become the Dean of the Faculty of Science at the University of Windsor.

During her tenure at the University of Windsor, Koschinsky became involved in outside organizations around the city including serving as vice-chair of the board of directors for WEtech Alliance and Chair of the Windsor-Essex Mission Committee. She was also a member of the steering committee for the South West Academic Health Network. Koschinsky remained as Dean of the Faculty of Science until 2015 when she accepted the position of executive director at the University of Western Ontario's Robarts Research Institute. As a result of her research into cardiovascular disease and the study of related risk factors, she was named a 2020 Fellow of the Canadian Academy of Health Sciences. The following year, Koschinsky was named a Member of the Order of Ontario.

== Personal life ==
Koschinsky is married to Michael Boffa.
