= Cawthra =

Cawthra is a surname. Notable people with the surname include:

- John Cawthra (1789–1851), merchant, distiller and political figure in Upper Canada
- Joseph Cawthra (1759–1842), Canadian merchant and politician
- Joseph Hermon Cawthra (1886–1957), British sculptor
- John Philip Cawthra, birth name of Gypie Mayo (1951–2013), British musician
- Mark Cawthra (born 1961), British musician
- William Cawthra (1801–1880), the eldest son of Joseph Cawthra, patriarch of the Cawthra family in Toronto, Ontario, Canada

== See also ==
- Cawthra family of Toronto, famous for its business, social and cultural contributions to the city
- Cawthra Park Secondary School, a public high school in Mississauga, Ontario, Canada
