= Adamson Estate =

Estate in Mississauga, Ontario, Canada

Coordinates: 43.562°N 79.567°W

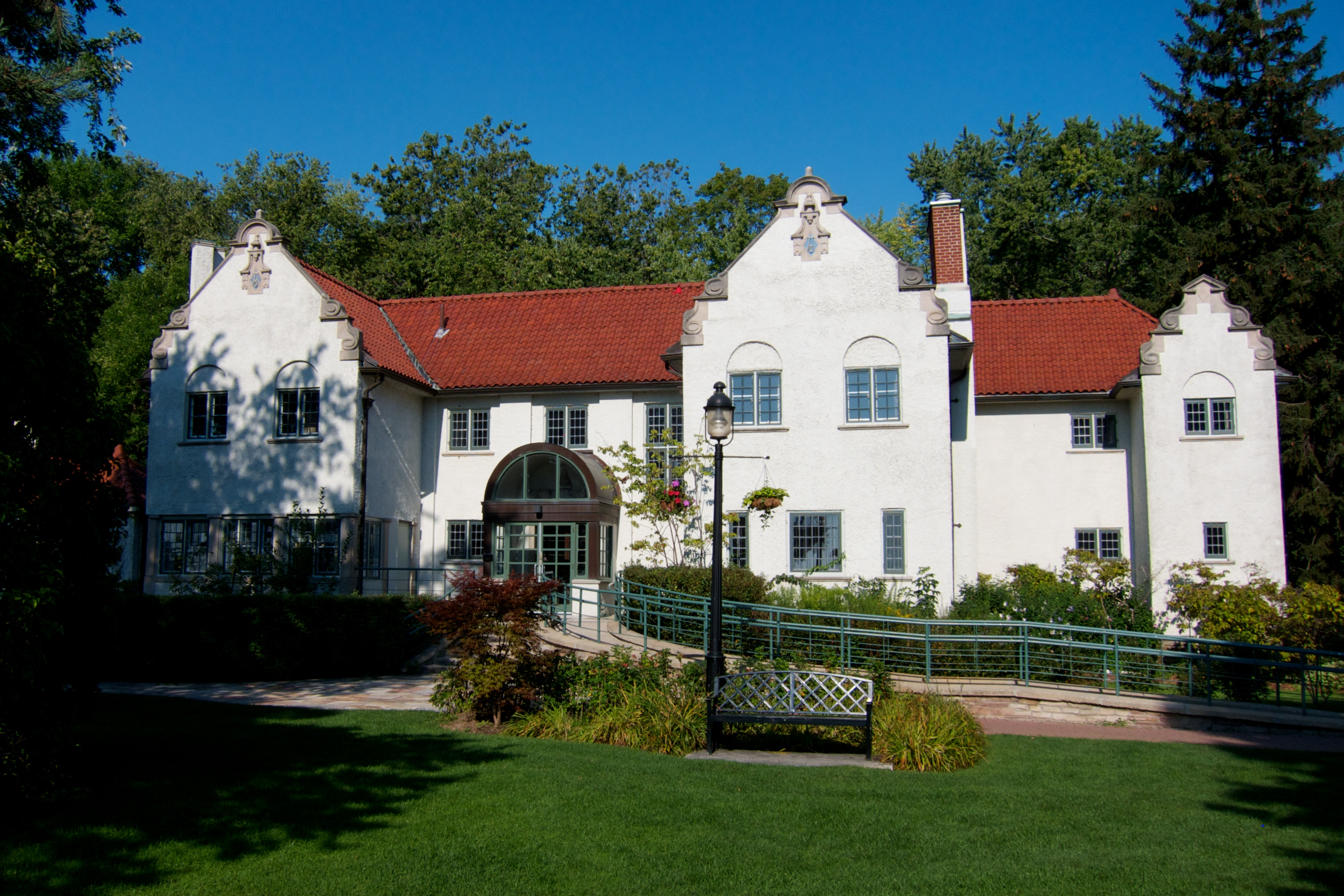
Adamson Estate, Lakeview, Mississauga

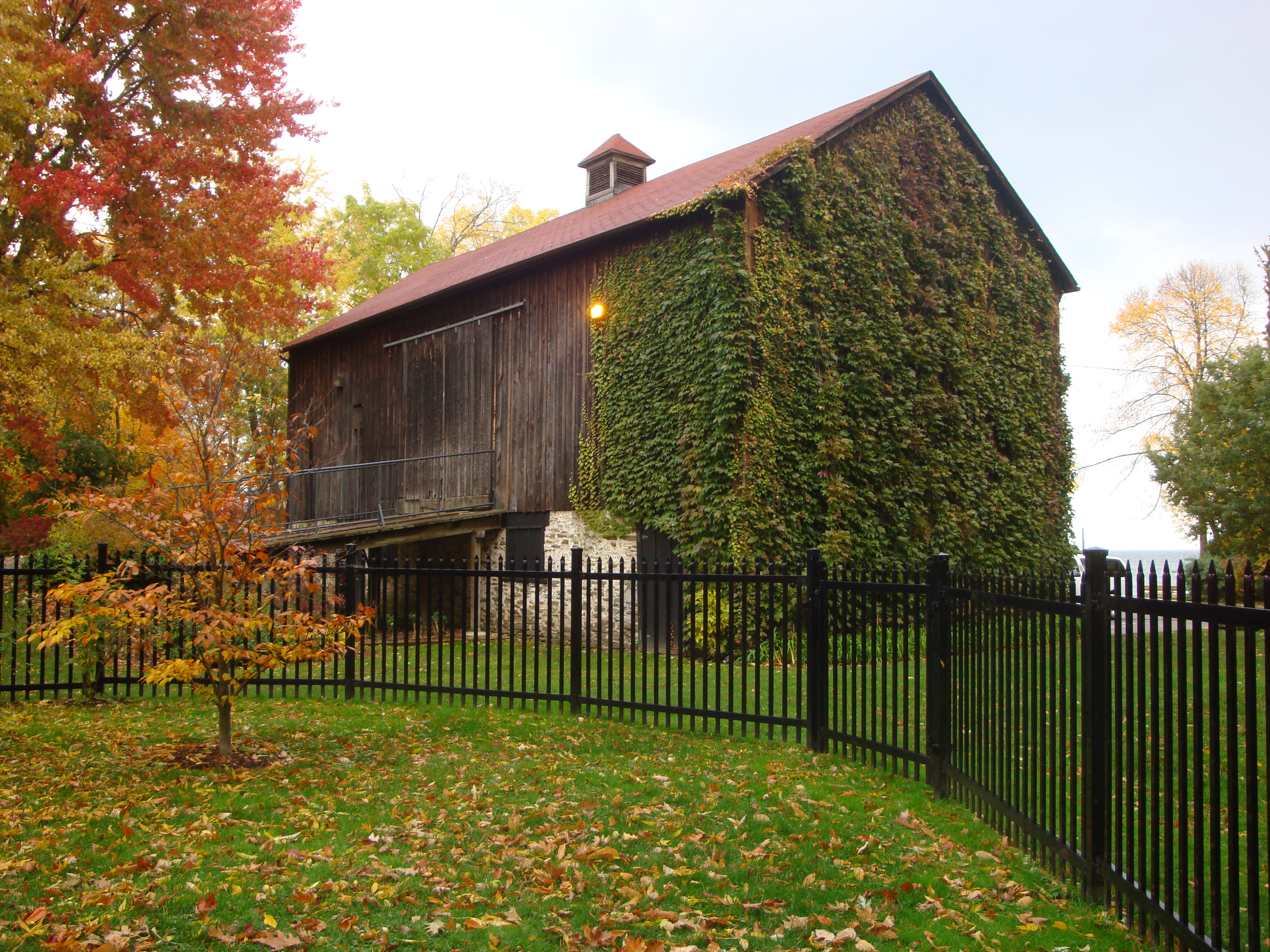
Adamson Estate barn

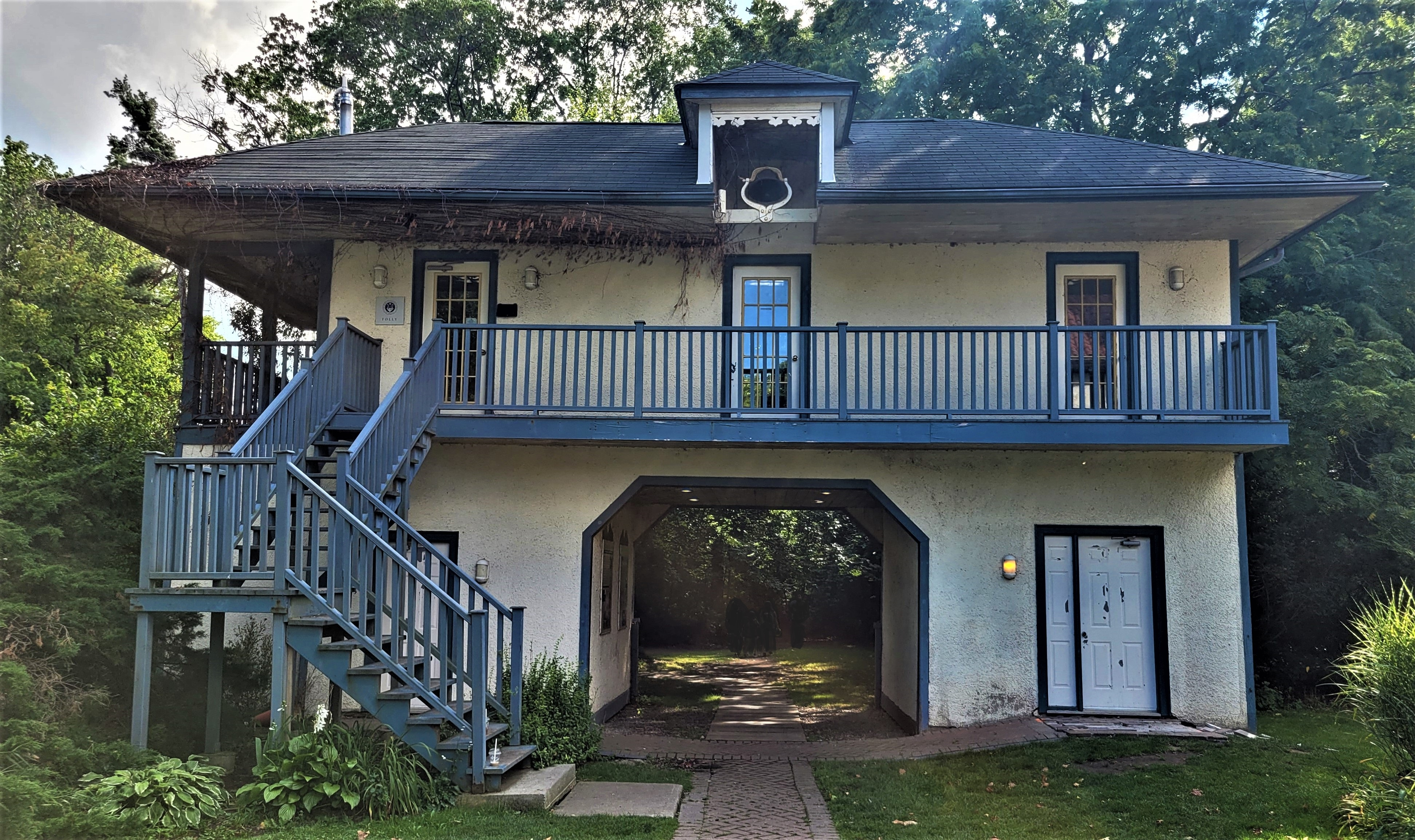
Adamson Estate, Gatehouse

The Adamson Estate, which forms the eastern boundary of the Port Credit neighbourhood of Mississauga, Ontario, was purchased from the family of Agar Adamson by Credit Valley Conservation Authority in 1975 upon the urging of the local ratepayers group known as Project H21 after a proposed real estate development which would have changed the character of the neighbourhood. It is now a public park on the Waterfront Trail. It was recognized as a Historic Place in 1978.

== History ==
The land on which the property is built was acquired by Joseph Cawthra in 1809. The farmland, which came to be known as the Grove Farm, was granted to Agar Adamson and Mabel Cawthra as a wedding gift.

Agar Adamson, born on Christmas Day 1865, was the grandson of William Agar Adamson an influential Toronto clergyman. He married into the Cawthra family whose legacy in Peel lives on through the Cawthra Estate located near the intersection of the Cawthra Road and the Queen Elizabeth Way. Their legacy comes from supplying eastern white pine logs for ship masts in the British Royal Navy. He served under General Arthur Currie. Insights into his time at war may be seen in the CBC series The Great War which features Talbot Papineau, another of the four Canadians featured in the book.

Agar Adamson designed and built the Belgian-style mansion on this land in 1919, after returning from the wartime service in France. In 1943, his son Anthony Adamson added a home for himself on the property. The estate was acquired by the Credit Valley Conservation Authority in 1975.

== Architecture ==
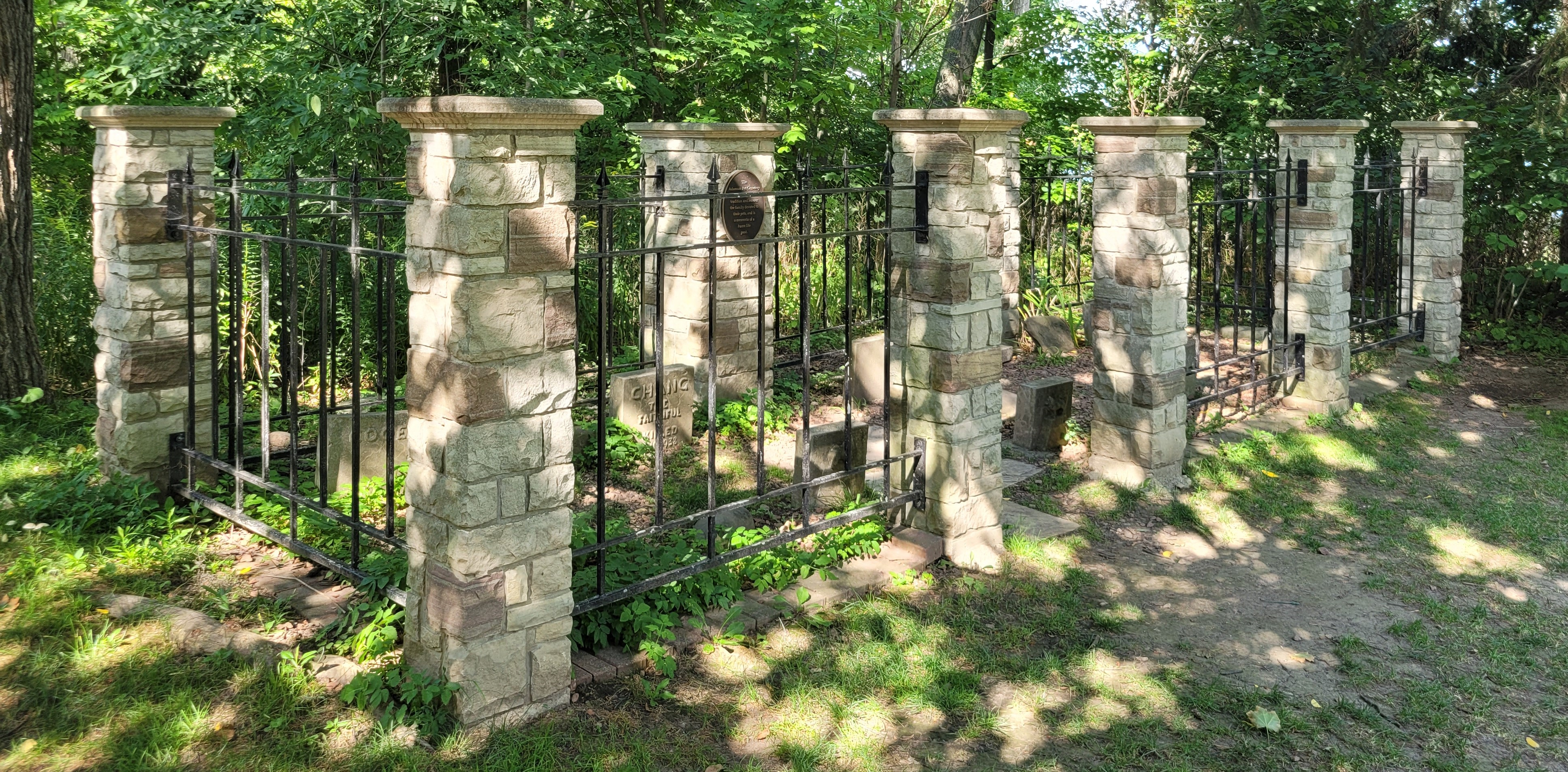
Adamson Estate, Pet Cemetery

The architecture of the main house, often thought to be Spanish is actually Flemish architecture, one of the areas in the European theatre in which Agar fought during the First World War.

One of the treasures of the Adamson Estate are the great eastern white pine, the provincial tree of Ontario, which remain on the site and are ties to the heritage of the Adamson/Cawthra families and that of the early development of Toronto Township, Peel County, now known largely as Mississauga, Region of Peel.

Another element of interest is the family pet cemetery which has been recently surrounded by a wrought iron fence with stone pillars and memorial plaque.

== Today ==
The old mansion of the Adamson Estate is now leased to the City of Mississauga to operate as a public park.
