= Cawthra family =

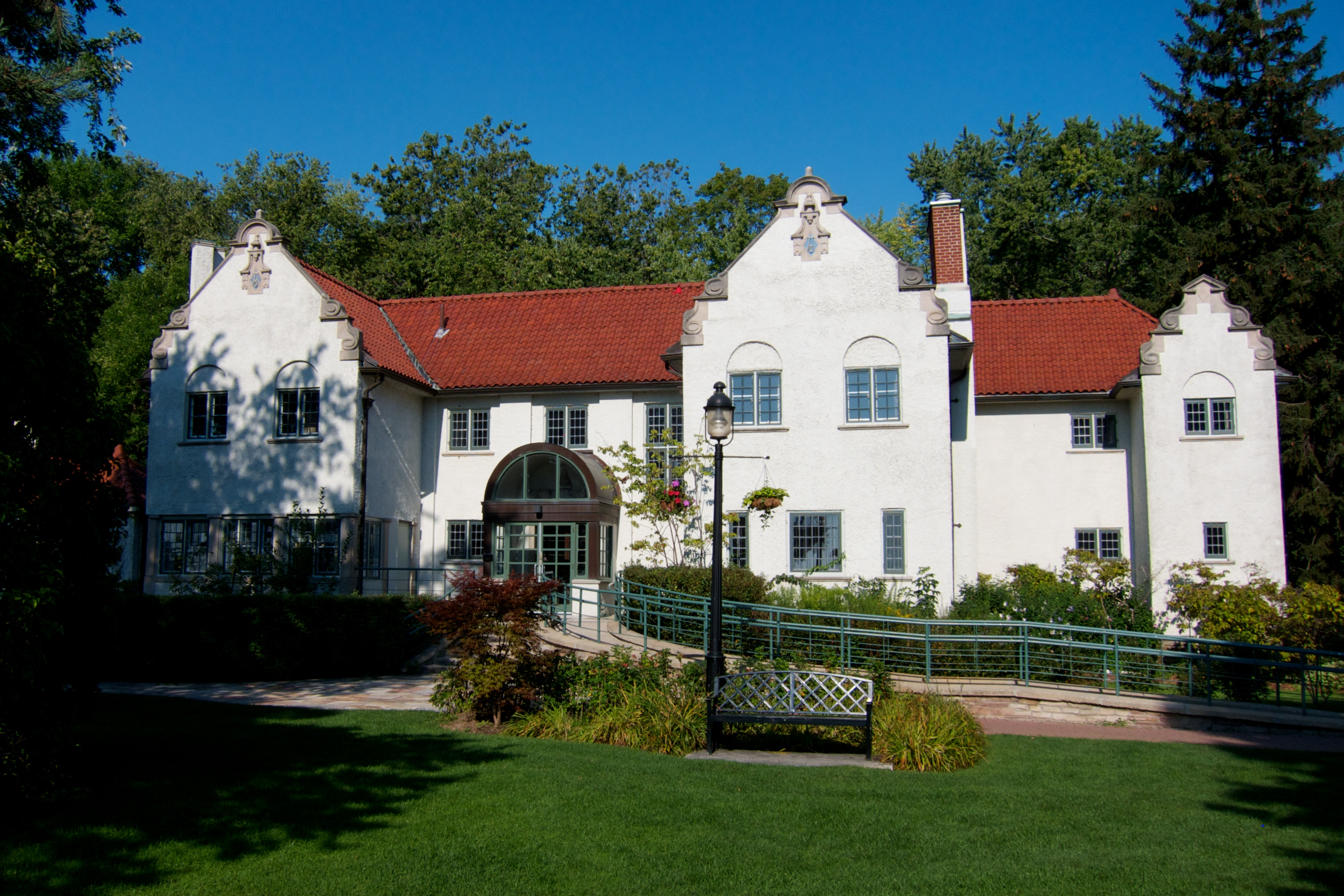
The Adamson Estate is built on land acquired by Joseph Cawthra in 1809. The land was granted to Agar Adamson and Mabel Cawthra as a wedding gift.

The Cawthra family of Toronto was famous for its business, social and cultural contributions to the city. It is one of the oldest families in Toronto, and many descendants of the family's founder, Joseph Cawthra, continue to play significant roles in Toronto society.

== History ==
Joseph Cawthra migrated to Canada from Yorkshire in 1803. In 1809, he acquired a large parcel of land along the Ontario lakeshore and the Credit River, near the present-day Port Credit. The narrow dirt road that cut through his property is now the Cawthra Road in Mississauga. Sometime later, the Cawthra family moved to the Town of York, where William Cawthra acquired several properties. One such property on Lot 19 Concession 3 on Yonge Street would later become Mount Pleasant Cemetery, Toronto.

== Notable members ==
- Joseph Cawthra - the family's founder in Canada
  - William Cawthra - expanded on his inheritance and contributed to the political and civic growth of Toronto; son of Joseph Cawthra
  - John Cawthra - soldier in the War of 1812 and first MP for Simcoe County; son of Joseph Cawthra
- Mabel Cawthra Adamson (1871–1943) - painter and decorator; wife of Agar Adamson daughter of John Cawthra
  - Agar Rodney Adamson (1901–1954) - mining engineer and Progressive Conservative MP for York West (1940–1954); son of Mabel Cawthra Adamson and Agar Adamson
  - Anthony Patrick Cawthra Adamson (1906–2002) - historian, architect and author; son of Mabel Cawthra Adamson and Agar Adamson
- Latham Cawthra Burns (1930–2015) - honorary chairman of BMO Nesbitt Burns; son of Latham Burns Sr. (c. 1906–1936) and grandson of Herbert D. Burns (chairman of the Bank of Nova Scotia)
  - Cawthra Burns - Toronto socialite and equestrienne; daughter of Latham Cawthra Burns
