= Thornton–Smith Building =

Building in Toronto, Ontario, Canada

The Thornton–Smith Building
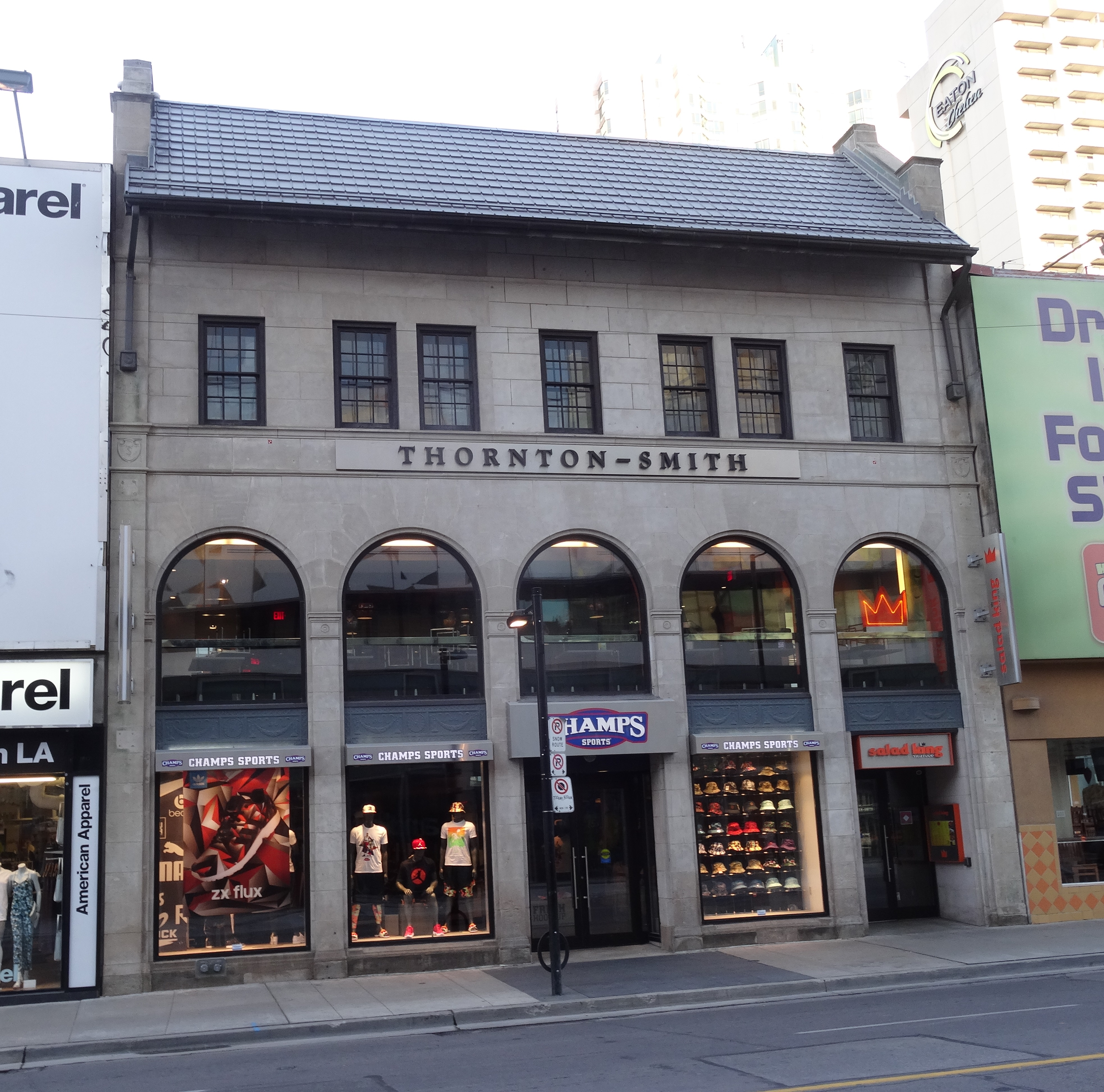
- View of facade from East side of Yonge Street facing West
- Interactive map of the The Thornton–Smith Building area

General information
- Architectural style: Neoclassical, Beaux-Arts
- Location: 340 Yonge Street; Toronto, Ontario, Canada
- Coordinates: 43.6576479°N 79.3817284°W

Design and construction
- Architect: John M. Lyle

The Thornton–Smith Building, located at 340 Yonge Street, is a prominent heritage building in the heart of downtown Toronto, Ontario, Canada. Since the completion of the building in the twenties, Yonge Street has seen many transformations. While tenants in the building have reflected these changes, the Thornton–Smith Building itself has remained true to its original architecture.

The building was designed in 1922 by John M. Lyle (1872-1945) for The Thornton–Smith Company, a British antique and interior design firm. Lyle, who was one of the pre-eminent architects in Canada at the time, was very vocal about the proliferation of false shopfronts and unregulated billboards on Yonge Street. Through The Thornton–Smith Building he was given the opportunity to inject an architectural gem amongst much less distinguished buildings in the increasingly crowded Yonge Street retail corridor. In 1926 his design received the first gold medal awarded by the Ontario Association of Architects, along with recognition in international architectural journals in London and New York.

Today, Thornton–Smith is a very vibrant building and is occupied on the main floor by Champs Sports, an international retailer and on the second floor by Salad King, a Toronto “landmark” that has been serving Thai food in the neighbourhood for over 20 years. A new heritage event venue named the Aperture Room opened in April 2015 to bring some of the history back to this part of Yonge Street.

== Yonge Street ==
=== Growth of Yonge Street retail ===
In the early 20th century, downtown Yonge Street was dominated by important Victorian-era retail properties, most notably the Eaton's and Simpsons stores at Yonge Street and Queen Street West. These huge department stores were surrounded by smaller commercial properties, a mix of building styles and materials in various states of repair with awnings and signage jutting out over the busy sidewalk. The result was a cramped streetscape which assaulted the senses as retailers clamoured for pedestrians’ attention.

The mid-20th century saw major changes to the appearance of Yonge Street as landmark buildings were demolished, modern structures added, and construction begun on the Yonge Line of the Toronto Transit Commission’s subway system. From 1949-54, subway construction crews dug tunnels underneath Yonge Street, closing portions of the street as work progressed and blocking pedestrian and vehicle access. These interruptions, combined with the relocation of many Toronto residents from downtown to suburban communities following World War II, meant that Yonge Street businesses saw a decline in customer traffic. The post-war period saw a shift from traditional clothing and housewares retailers on Yonge Street towards live music and adult entertainment establishments, capitalizing on the availability of space, transit-accessible location, proximity of Toronto’s existing nightlife and entertainment venues, and the relaxation of obscenity laws in Canada during the 1960s. “Taverns became strip clubs, bookstores branched into adult materials, and entrepreneurs opened erotic massage parlours,” giving Yonge Street a seedy reputation amongst Torontonians.

The late 20th century saw the gradual revitalization of the downtown Yonge Street area, led by the opening of major retail spaces and formal organization of local businesses. The Toronto Eaton Centre opened in 1977, bringing the shopping mall from the suburbs to the downtown core and driving daytime shopping traffic to the area once more. Starting in the 1960s, three stores in particular served as retail anchors on Yonge Street, pulling shoppers north of Dundas Street: Sam the Record Man (1961), A&A Records (1974), and the World’s Biggest Bookstore (1980). Growing interest in revitalizing downtown Yonge Street resulted in the creation of the Downtown Yonge Business Improvement Area (2001), giving local business owners a chance to collaborate and advocate together for improvements to Yonge Street.

=== Yonge Street as gathering place ===
The presence of major retailers has consistently drawn shopping, pedestrian, and tourist traffic to the downtown Yonge Street area, making it natural gathering space for celebration, protest, and community-building. Businesses along Yonge Street have borne witness to major social, political, and community events since the mid-19th century, including military parades (during World War I and World War II), Royal visits, victory celebrations (after the Second Boer War, Armistice Day, V-E Day, and V-J Day), student protests, marathons, cultural heritage parades (including annual Caribana, Santa Claus Parade, Festival of India, and St. Patrick’s Day parades), and civil rights activism (Pride Week events, and the 1992 Yonge St. Riot). Downtown Yonge Street has also been at the center of celebrations of Canadian and Toronto sports teams such as when Canada won the Olympic Gold Medal in 2010 and when the Blue Jays won the World Series in 1992.

The role of Yonge Street as a major North-South thoroughfare, centre of retail activity, and inclusion in numerous annual parade routes contributed to the push to develop community space, starting in the 1970s. From 1971-74, portions of Yonge Street were closed to form a pedestrian mall. The Downtown Yonge Business Improvement Area association led the creation of Yonge-Dundas Square on the southeast corner of Yonge Street and Dundas Street East, providing a public venue to feature live performances and public events. The square has hosted concerts, live sporting events, film screenings, art installations, vigils, and festivals, as well as become an unofficial gathering place for Torontonians in times of celebration following local sports victories. Often referred to as “Toronto’s Times Square,” Yonge-Dundas Square has ensured a constant spotlight on the Downtown Yonge area.

=== Music on Yonge ===
With the growth of Yonge Street as a commercial centre by the early 20th century, live entertainment venues began opening along the street in order to capitalize on the near-constant crowds of pedestrians and vehicles. These venues included Massey Hall (opened in 1893 and renovated in 1933), Loew’s Yonge Street Theatre (opened 1913, today the Elgin and Winter Garden Theatres), Pantages Theatre (opened 1920, today the Ed Mirvish Theatre), the Eaton’s College Street location (opened 1930, today College Park), The Brown Derby (1949), Le Coq d’Or (1950s), and the Zanzibar Tavern (opened in 1960).

The music scene along Yonge Street in the 1950s and 60s was furnished by a number of changes to both the law and the local area. The formalization of the Liquor Licensing Board of Ontario in 1947 meant that drinking and live entertainment could occur in the same venue. Located at Yonge St. and Gould St. since 1948 (directly across from 340 Yonge Street), the Ryerson Polytechnical Institute brought young students to the area in large numbers, and became a degree-granting institution in 1971. In venues like The Hawk’s Nest, The Colonial Tavern, The Sapphire Tavern, Club Blue Note, and Club 888, the R&B-inflected Toronto Sound was refined by rock bands such as Ronnie Hawkins and the Hawks (later The Band), Jack London and the Sparrows (later Steppenwolf), and the Mynah Birds. Gordon Lightfoot was also a regular performer at Steele’s Tavern, between A&A’s and Sam the Record Man.

With the push for the revival of downtown Yonge Street in the early 2000s, live musical performances became a regular occurrence in order to draw people to the area. Concerts, often sponsored the HMV store at 333 Yonge Street, included Alice Cooper (1991), Green Day (1997), and Red Hot Chili Peppers (1999). Live performances were later moved south to Yonge-Dundas Square, growing in scale and attracting musicians from all genres. More recently, Lady Antebellum, Serena Ryder, Julie Black and the Tragically Hip have performed concerts at Yonge-Dundas Square. These performances have brought thousands of spectators to the area and often shut down portions of Yonge Street, adding to the reputation of the downtown Yonge area as an ongoing outdoor venue and cultural hotspot.

== Description of building ==
The Thornton–Smith Building sits on the west side of Yonge Street in downtown Toronto, south of Elm Street. Its facade features five two-storey showroom windows surmounted by arches made of stone voussoirs, with pilasters in between each window. The capital of each pilaster column features a small circular medallion. The size and prominence of the windows, combined with a row of seven sash windows on the third storey, emphasize the overall thinness of the facade. The use of a metal substructure to carry the weight of the building allowed for a flat facade surface, on which natural light could play. The facade is covered with light-grey ashlar Indiana limestone, with decorative metal window spandrels, and architraves delineating the first and second floors. A steep ornamental roof of interlocking tiles overhangs the front of the building.

The building at 340 Yonge Street demonstrated a restrained use of Classical architectural elements - the arch, the architrave, the pilaster, and the medallion - in contrast to the “meanness” of the surrounding streetscape, with “its proliferation of false shopfronts... defaced by unregulated billboard and store signage, all hidden behind electrical and streetcar poles and wires.”

== Historical significance ==
=== Architecture ===
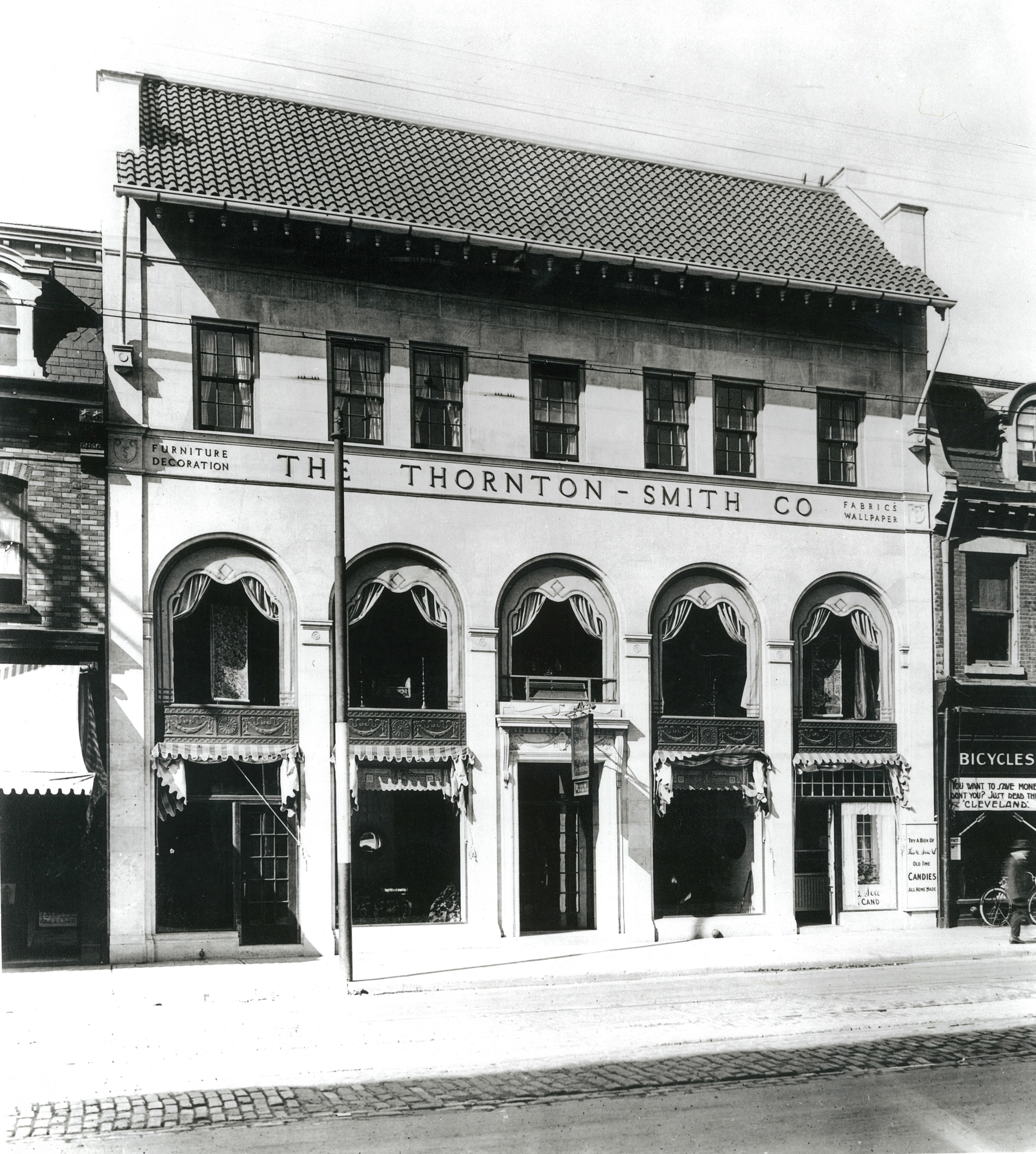
The Thornton–Smith Building, view from Yonge Street, c.1925

The Thornton–Smith Building was designed by Irish-born architect John M. Lyle, a leader in the Toronto architecture profession and champion of the neoclassical Beaux-Arts style. Having grown up in Hamilton, Ontario, Lyle studied architecture at Yale University and at the École des Beaux-Arts in Paris, France. Upon graduation in 1896, he worked for architectural firms Howard & Cauldwell and Carrere & Hastings in New York City In 1905, Lyle returned to Toronto design and build the Royal Alexandra Theatre on King Street. This prominent commission enabled him to establish his own practice, Atelier Lyle.

Lyle helped disseminate Beaux-Arts Classicism through his commissions. While the style peaked in America prior to the First World War, many younger Canadian architects championed the use of Beaux-Arts well into the 1920s - Lyle was considered a leader amongst this faction of professionals. His style grew to incorporate floral and faunal motifs inspired by the Post-Impressionist style of Canadian painters The Group of Seven.

In 1926, the Ontario Association of Architects held an exhibition of members’ post-war works, at which Lyle exhibited drawings for the Thornton–Smith Building along with two other structures. Deemed “the finest work on view at the present convention,” the Lyle won first place in the commercial category and the OAA’s first gold medal award for his work on the Thornton–Smith Building.

The building became a featured portfolio accomplishment for Lyle, who later designed the Commemorative Arch at the Royal Military College in Kingston, Ontario, Union Station in Toronto, Ontario, and the Thomas B. McQuesten High Level Bridge in Hamilton, Ontario.

=== Thornton–Smith Company ===
The opening of the Thornton–Smith Company was led by painter and decorator Mabel Cawthra Adamson (1871-1943), member of the prominent Cawthra family of Toronto. Adamson studied at the Guild of Handicrafts under Charles Robert Ashbee (1863-1942) while living in England from 1902-3, a centre of the British-led Arts and Crafts design movement. Upon her return to Canada in 1903, she co-founded and was elected the first president of the Society of Arts and Crafts in Canada. Later renamed the Canadian Society of Applied Art, the group made a conscious effort to provide the individual names of artisans featured in annual exhibitions in order to foster appreciation of Canadian craftspeople and manufacturers.

In 1903, Adamson established the first Canadian branch of the Thornton–Smith Company, to capitalize on the popularity of Arts and Crafts furnishings within Toronto’s consumer market. The Company’s first art director was Scottish-born decorator Peter Charles Browne. The Thornton–Smith Company sold fabrics, drapery, carpets, windows, mosaics, custom-designed furniture, period reproduction furniture, and electric fixtures. Along with providing interior design services for individual clients and architects, and specialized in the decoration of churches and theatres

Through connections made by Adamson’s husband, Agar Adamson (1865-1929), the Company was hired to furnish the Senate Chamber in Ottawa in 1904. This much-publicized refurbishment was followed by a commission in 1906-7 to decorate the new Royal Alexandra Theatre in Toronto under architect John M. Lyle. Adamson’s family provided key legal and financial support for the growth of the Thornton–Smith Company, with her husband Agar serving as titular head of the firm. In 1921, Mabel Adamson’s brother William Herbert (“Bertie”) Cawthra hired Lyle’s firm, Atelier Lyle, to design and build a new location for the Thornton–Smith Company at 340 Yonge Street

=== Prominent tenants ===
When The Thornton–Smith Building opened in 1922, the northerly entrance of the building was leased to Laura Secord Chocolates. The confectionery company, founded by Frank P. O’Connor in 1913, had opened its first retail location just a few doors north at 350 Yonge Street but relocated to 340 Yonge Street as can be seen in a photo taken in the 1920s.

During the 1950s the Thornton–Smith Building housed Allen Stores Limited, which occupied both 340 and 346 Yonge Street. The department store sold women’s wear and home furnishings, and was considered a discount alternative to Eaton’s.

In 1966, brothers Jack and Ken Rutherford moved their growing photography store, The Toronto Camera Exchange, from Church Street to the new location at 340 Yonge Street. Started by their father George Rutherford in 1946, the company quickly became a major Canadian photographic supplier with stores and a mail-order business which reached photographers across the country. The Toronto Camera Centre at 340 Yonge Street occupied all four floors of the Thornton–Smith Building, and became Canada’s largest photographic store.

Since the mid-1990s, a number of other prominent businesses have occupied The Thornton–Smith Building, including Foot Locker, an international retailer and Reilly’s Restaurant & Bar a well-known pub in the neighbourhood which hosted many successful events over the years including Ryerson Pub Nights.

Today, Thornton–Smith is a very vibrant building and is occupied on the main floor by Champs Sports, an international retailer and on the second floor by Salad King, a Toronto “landmark” that has been serving Thai food in the neighbourhood for over 20 years.

The third floor is home to a newly renovated, loft-like event space called the Aperture Room. Named and designed with the building and neighbourhood's history in mind, the space features exposed brick, hardwood floors, plaster ceilings and three large skylights. The open floor plan can accommodate 120 seated guests, and up to 180 reception-style for a wide variety of events including cocktail receptions, business events, weddings or concerts.

== Heritage recognition ==
The Thornton–Smith Building is one of the few surviving early 20th-century buildings on the west side of Yonge Street between Dundas Street East and Gould Street. North of Gould, 362A Yonge Street (c.1914) is also identified on the City’s heritage inventory. Most of the remaining building stock which represented the early 20th century development of Yonge Street as the City’s “main street” has been replaced or concealed by large billboard signs.

On March 15, 1974, the Thornton–Smith Building was added to Inventory of Heritage Properties maintained by the former City of Toronto, making it a listed heritage building.
