= Cawthra House =

- Location within Toronto

General information
- Coordinates: 43°38′57″N 79°22′46″W

Cawthra House is the name of two of three homes associated with the Cawthra family in the Greater Toronto Area.

== William Cawthra House ==
The first Cawthra house was a mansion completed in 1853 for businessman William Cawthra by architect Joseph Sheard and William Irving.

The Toronto residence was one of several properties of the influential Cawthra family in Toronto. It became a branch of Molsons Bank in 1885, then a Sterling Bank from 1908 and finally home to Canada Life Assurance Company from 1926 until 1929.

Attempts to preserve the house failed and by 1949 it was demolished to make way for the Bank of Nova Scotia Building, now part of Scotia Plaza.

== John Cawthra House ==
The second house was built for John Cawthra (1789–1851) in 1830 as a home and retail store. It is still standing at 262 Main Street North in Newmarket, Ontario.

== Cawthra-Elliot Estate ==
The Cawthra-Elliot Estate was built on land once part of Joseph Cawthra’s land holdings, in the Cawthra Park area in the City of Mississauga to the west.

The Cawthra-Elliot Estate is a Georgian Revivalist home built by W. L. Somerville for Grace Cawthra, daughter of Henry Cawthra and granddaughter of John Cawthra, in 1925-1926. The estate lands were once part of Joseph Cawthra’s 200 acres Crown grant in 1808. Following the death of Grace Cawthra-Elliot the home is now owned by the City of Mississauga.

Bricks from Joseph Cawthra House were repurposed for a garden wall.

== See also ==
- Canada Life Building - successor to Joseph Cawthra House as Canada Life Head office in Toronto.
