= Bank & Baron =

Pub in a provincially designated heritage building in Calgary, Alberta

- Location in Calgary
- Former names: Bank of Nova Scotia Building
- Alternative names: The Bank and Baron P.U.B.

General information
- Type: Former bank, now pub and event venue
- Architectural style: Modern Classical with Art Deco detailing
- Location: Calgary, Alberta, Canada, 125 8 Avenue SW
- Coordinates: 51.045318°N 114.064596°W
- Current tenants: Bank and Baron P.U.B.
- Construction started: 1930
- Completed: 1930

Design and construction
- Architect: John M. Lyle
- Designations: Provincial Historic Resource (27 February 1981)

The Bank & Baron is a pub and events venue in downtown Calgary, Alberta, occupying the former Bank of Nova Scotia building at 125 8 Avenue SW. The one storey main banking hall and street facade date to 1930 and stand on Stephen Avenue. The building is recognized by Alberta as a Provincial Historic Resource.

== History ==
=== Origins ===
The Bank of Nova Scotia entered the Alberta market during the economic growth of the early twentieth century, opening branches across the province to serve expanding commerce and energy development. In Calgary, the bank acquired a prominent site on 8 Avenue SW, within the city’s principal retail and financial corridor. In 1929 it commissioned John M. Lyle to design a new main branch building. Despite the economic downturn of the Great Depression, construction proceeded and the building opened in 1930.

=== Bank use ===
For several decades the branch served as a regional headquarters. Its high-ceilinged banking hall with skylight and stone finishes reflected the bank’s emphasis on stability and prestige. The location remained in continuous operation until the mid 1970s, when the Bank of Nova Scotia relocated to the newly developed Scotia Centre tower complex.

=== Later tenants ===
Following the move, the property saw a period of underuse. In subsequent decades it accommodated restaurants, clubs and entertainment venues, with reported tenants including the Cha Cha Palace in the early 1980s, Rococo Restaurant and later The Bank nightclub. Heritage designation by the province in 1981 ensured that key exterior and interior elements were preserved through adaptive reuse.

=== Adaptation as pub and event space ===
In 2012 TMAC Pub and Restaurant Group leased the building and undertook a retrofit balancing hospitality functions with conservation requirements. The Bank & Baron P.U.B. opened on 14 February 2014, retaining the original banking hall as its main bar and event space. The venue is used for weddings, corporate receptions and community gatherings; the site as a year-round 5,000 sq ft venue with capacity for up to 600 guests.

== Architecture and heritage ==
The exterior is a composition in Modern Classical style with Canadian motifs, designed by architect John M. Lyle. Relief panels depict regional themes including agriculture, ranching and commerce; bronze balconets and fluted pilasters structure the upper bays. Interior elements identified in heritage records include a high banking hall with skylight, coffered ceilings, stone and marble finishes, and murals with Canadian themes. The building contributes to the historic streetscape of Stephen Avenue.

== Tourism ==
The Bank and Baron is considered a heritage site and appears on walking tours organized by the City of Calgary and Heritage Calgary. The venue serves tourists as both a dining experience and a historic interior accessible to visitors, contributing to the draw of the Stephen Avenue National Historic Site. The building is part of Calgary’s broader strategy of linking hospitality and heritage assets to downtown visitor experiences.

== See also ==
- Stephen Avenue
