= Winnie Leuszler =

Canadian swimmer

Personal information
- Born: February 3, 1926 Port Credit, Ontario, Canada
- Died: May 1, 2004 (aged 78) Surrey, British Columbia, Canada

Sport
- Sport: Swimming

Winnifred "Winnie" Frances Roach-Leuszler, O.Ont (February 3, 1926 – May 1, 2004) was a Canadian long distance swimmer. A long distance swimmer of international acclaim, she started swimming when she as a child and later became the first Canadian to swim the English Channel.

== Early life ==
Leuszler was born February 3, 1926, in Port Credit, Ontario. She started swimming when she was three years old. At nine years of age, she won her first medal as a competitive swimmer. She would go on to win local, provincial, national, North American, and international medals throughout her career.

In 1944, she was labeled Canada's All Round Athlete of the year. That same year she joined the Women's Corp and was dominating Army, Navy and Air Forces sporting championships. In 1946, while three months pregnant, she won the 5 mile World Swimming Championship and while four months pregnant in 1949 she was second in the same event.

On August 16, 1951, she became the first Canadian to swim the English Channel. She came home to a ticker tape parade in Toronto.

In 1954, she entered the swim across Lake Ontario with Marilyn Bell but was forced from the event due to problems with her guide boat. In the 1950s, she was lured into baseball and in 1957 she was Canada's first female baseball umpire.

In 1996, she was inducted into the Canadian Forces Sports Hall of Fame. In 1999 she received the Order of Ontario and was inducted into the Ontario Swimming Hall of Fame.

She died in Surrey, British Columbia, on May 1, 2004.
