= Agar Rodney Adamson =

Canadian politician (1901–1954)

Rodney Adamson

Member of Parliament for York West
- In office 1940–1954
- Preceded by: John Streight
- Succeeded by: John Hamilton

Personal details
- Born: November 8, 1901 Toronto, Ontario, Canada
- Died: April 8, 1954 (aged 52) Moose Jaw, Saskatchewan, Canada
- Party: Conservative; Progressive Conservative
- Spouse(s): Rosamund Lazier (1930–1943); Cynthia Jacqueline Oakley (1947–1954)
- Relations: Agar Adamson, father Mabel Cawthra, mother Anthony Adamson, brother
- Children: 2
- Occupation: Mining engineer

Military service
- Allegiance: Canadian
- Branch/service: Royal Air Force, 1918; Canadian Army, 1940–1945
- Rank: Lieutenant
- Unit: Lorne Scots

Agar Rodney Adamson (November 8, 1901 – April 8, 1954) was a Canadian politician. He was a Progressive Conservative member of the House of Commons of Canada who represented the riding of York West from 1940 to 1954. He died in a plane crash in 1954.

== Biography ==
Adamson was born in Toronto, Ontario, in 1901. He was the son of Agar Adamson, who commanded Princess Patricia's Canadian Light Infantry from 1916 to 1918 during World War I. His mother was Mabel Cawthra, a wealthy heiress, artist and decorator. He attended Ridley College in St. Catharines and later Magdalene College in Cambridge, England. At the age of 17, he enlisted in the Royal Air Force and served as a pilot in 1918 in the last year of World War I. He was trained as a mining engineer and worked for Brazilian Traction in South America and Ontario Hydro.

He was elected as a Conservative to represent York West, a riding to the west of Toronto that would eventually become Mississauga. Shortly after he was elected he took leave from parliament to serve overseas in the army with the Lorne Scots regiment. He served with the regiment for two years as an intelligence officer. In 1942 he transferred to a headquarters unit in London, England where he served for the rest of the war. In 1947 he married Cynthia Jacqueline Oakley whom he had met in Banff on a skiing trip. Previously he had been married to Rosamund Lazier but that marriage ended in divorce. He and Cynthia raised two sons.

After the war, he returned to his role as M.P. He was re-elected in 1945, 1949 and 1953. He and his wife died in a TCA plane crash near Moose Jaw, SK, on April 8, 1954. He was 52.

== Electoral record ==
1953 Canadian federal election: York West
Party	Candidate	Votes	%	±%
Progressive Conservative	Agar Rodney Adamson	12,228	41.5	+3.4
Liberal	Robert M. Campbell	10,262	34.8	-2.3
Co-operative Commonwealth	Charles Hibbert Millard	6,569	22.3	-2.5
Labor–Progressive	Harry Hunter	417	1.4	
Total valid votes		29,476	100.0	

1949 Canadian federal election: York West
Party	Candidate	Votes	%	±%
Progressive Conservative	Agar Rodney Adamson	19,184	38.1	-3.1
Liberal	Kenneth Thompson	18,689	37.1	+0.9
Co-operative Commonwealth	Murray S. Kernighan	12,498	24.8	+4.7
Total valid votes		50,371	100.0	

1945 Canadian federal election: York West
Party	Candidate	Votes	%	±%
Progressive Conservative	Agar Rodney Adamson	14,703	41.2	-3.4
Liberal	Chris. J. Bennett	12,947	36.2	-6.0
Co-operative Commonwealth	Murray S. Kernighan	7,183	20.1	+6.9
Labor–Progressive	Alexander Whyte Welch	886	2.5	-97.5
Total valid votes		35,719	100.0	

1940 Canadian federal election: York West
Party	Candidate	Votes	%	±%
Conservative	Agar Rodney Adamson	12,788	44.6	+12.9
Liberal	Chris. J. Bennett	12,117	42.2	+10.3
Co-operative Commonwealth	David Lewis	3,787	13.2	-6.4
Total valid votes		28,692	100.0	

Note: "National Government" vote is compared to Conservative vote in 1935 election.
