= Mabel Cawthra =

Canadian painter and decorator

Mabel Cawthra Adamson
- Born: Mabel Cawthra; 1871; Lucerne, Switzerland
- Died: 1943 (aged 71–72); Port Credit, Ontario, Canada
- Occupations: Painter and decorator
- Known for: Arts & crafts decoration

Mabel Cawthra Adamson (1871–1943) was a Canadian painter and decorator, who was active in the Arts and Crafts movement in Toronto.

== Early years ==
Mabel Cawthra was born in Lucerne, Switzerland, in 1871. The Cawthra family were wealthy Canadian merchants, described by her son Anthony Adamson as the "Astors of Upper Canada". They owned a huge amount of property in the western part of Toronto. She attended the Victorian Era Ball on 28 December 1897 hosted by the Governor General and the Countess of Aberdeen at the new Militia Armory in Toronto. The ball celebrated Queen Victoria's diamond jubiliee, and proceeds went to the Victorian Order of Nurses. Mabel dressed as Madame Recamier, as depicted in a portrait by Jacques-Louis David. She married Agar Adamson, also from a patrician Upper Canada family, on 15 November 1899.

== Married life ==
Soon after their marriage Agar Adamson was sent to Halifax, Nova Scotia, to serve with the Royal Canadian Regiment of Infantry. Adamson was anxious to serve in the Second Boer War (1899–1902). In March 1900 he used his connections to obtain a position with Lord Strathcona's Horse. He reached South Africa early in June 1900.

After seeing action, Adamson fell ill and was sent as an invalid first to England, then in March 1901 to Canada. He made another attempt to see action, returning to South Africa in 1902, but the war had ended when he arrived.

Mabel became involved with the Arts and Crafts movement in England. In 1902–1903 she studied at Charles Robert Ashbee's Guild of Handicrafts in Chipping Campden in the Cotswalds. The school was known for enamel and metal working. It was also known for woodcarving and cabinetmaking, but Mabel probably focused on silversmithing, jewelry and enameling.

Mabel Cawthra Adamson became the first president of the Society of Arts and Crafts of Canada in 1903 after she returned from England. The vice president was George Agnew Reid, but more than half the members were women. The goals were "the encouragement of original design and its individual expression, to promote this object by holding Exhibitions of original Canadian work, the names of the designer and executant being always given; by occasional loan exhibits; by lectures; and by rendering the literature on the subject of handicraft accessible to those who are interested.

The first exhibition of the Society of Arts and Crafts of Canada was held at the Art Gallery on King Street in 1904. Fifteen of Mabel Adamson's pieces were exhibited, including a necklace, pendant and brooch.

Mabel founded the Canadian franchise of the Thornton-Smith Company, a British interior design firm, in 1905. The Thornton-Smith Company was headquartered at The Thornton-Smith Building, an award-winning Neoclassical building on Toronto's Yonge Street. Agar Adamson was made nominal head of the franchise. The W & E Thornton-Smith Company decorated several theaters and churches in Toronto.

Mabel was accomplished as an artist and craftswoman, and as an art collector. She used her inherited fortune and the income from her interior design company to support the arts. Mabel was a founding member of the Heliconian Club. This club, founded in 1909, is an association of women involved in the arts and letters based in Toronto.

During World War I Agar Adamson became a captain in the Princess Patricia's Canadian Light Infantry, and commanded the regiment from 1916 to 1918. Mabel helped the war effort in London and worked with civilian refugees behind the lines in Belgium when she became ill. Adamson resigned, ostensibly so he could be with her, but in fact because he was suffering from nervous exhaustion.

Mabel soon recovered, but Adamson now became affected by posttraumatic stress disorder, causing depression and lack of judgement. The marriage broke down, although there was no divorce.

== World War One ==
During World War One, Mabel Cawthra Adamson distinguished herself in service of Belgian civilians trapped behind fighting lines. She first joined the Belgian Soldier's Fund, and founded the Belgian Canal Boat Fund with fellow Canadian, Mrs. Kathryn Innis-Taylor in May 1915. The original aim of this fund was to make use of the existing canal network in Belgium to deliver humanitarian aid to civilians by barge because access to many communities by land was rendered impossible by fighting. Due to German occupation and the inability to obtain visas, The Fund was never able to acquire a barge. However, the Belgian Canal Boat Fund opened an orphanage and school located in Veurne, Belgium.

The school was known locally as "The Hut", and housed 370 Belgian children, provided education, and fed an additional 300 local families. When shelling and air raids frequently took place, everyone would shelter in trenches located behind the school. By the end of the war, The Belgian Canal Boat Fund raised $1,642,104 in cash, and $1,512,800 in supplies.

== Later years ==
Mabel Cawthra Adamson represented the Canadian Society of Applied Arts on the board of the Ontario College of Art (OCA) from 1912 to around 1920, with a gap during World War I (1914–1918), when she was out of the country. She donated a kiln to the OCA. In 1930, her pottery was exhibited at the Canadian National Exhibition in the Graphic Art Building. In 1934, she became a director of the Handcrafts Association of Canada. The Handcrafts Association had put on a successful exhibition at the Ridpath Galleries on Yonge Street. Eaton's offered the group floor space on the main floor of its store on College Street. Mabel Adamson and other wealthy women subscribed $2,000 to "a guarantee against loss fund". The association presented itself as an affiliate of the Canadian Handicrafts Guild.

Mabel Cawthra Adamson died in Port Credit, Ontario, in 1943. Her son Agar Rodney Adamson (1901–1954) was federal member of Parliament for York West from 1940 to 1954. Her second son Anthony Patrick Cawthra Adamson (1906–2002) was an architect, associate professor of town planning at the University of Toronto, chairman of the Ontario Arts Council, designer of Upper Canada Village, and a member of the Order of Canada.
