= John M. Lyle =

Canadian architect

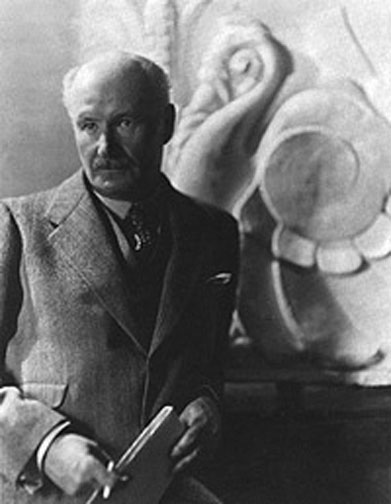
- Born: 13 November 1872; Connor, County Antrim, Ireland
- Died: 20 December 1945 (aged 73); Toronto, Ontario, Canada
- Education: Yale University
- Occupation: Architect
- Practice: Atelier Lyle 1906–1943
- Buildings: Royal Alexandra Theatre
- Projects: Worked on many Dominion Bank branches in Toronto 1911–1937
- Design: Royal Alexandra Theatre, Bank of Nova Scotia head office

John MacIntosh Lyle (13 November 1872 – 20 December 1945) was an Irish-Canadian architect, designer, urban planner, and teacher active in the late 19th century and into the first half of the 20th century. He was a leading Canadian architect in the Beaux Arts style and was involved in the City Beautiful movement in several Canadian cities. In the 1920s, he worked to develop his vision of a uniquely Canadian style of architecture.

== Biography ==
Lyle was born in Connor, County Antrim, Ireland on 13 November 1872. He came to Canada as a young child in 1878 and grew up in Hamilton, Ontario, where his father, Rev. Dr. Samuel Lyle, was minister of Central Presbyterian Church. Lyle attended the Hamilton School of Art. He trained as an architect at Yale University, enrolling in the École des Beaux-Arts, in Paris, France, in 1894. Following his graduation, he found work in 1896 with the New York architectural partnership of Howard & Cauldwell. Lyle subsequently became an associate with the New York firm of Carrère and Hastings—with which he was involved in the design of the New York Public Library Main Branch (Fifth Avenue at 42nd St., 1897)—and became a member of the Society of Beaux-arts Architects.

In 1904, John Lyle designed and supervised the construction of the main building (now named Rogers House) at Pickering College at 16945 Bayview Avenue in Newmarket, Ontario.

Lyle returned to Canada in 1905 to begin work on the Royal Alexandra Theatre in Toronto, Ontario. In 1906, he established his own company, Atelier Lyle, in Toronto.

During the 1920s, Lyle strove to develop a uniquely Canadian architectural style, incorporating traditional designs from the English and French colonial periods and stone, metal, plaster, fresco, glass and mosaic floral and faunal motifs inspired by the Canadian Post-Impressionist painters known as the Group of Seven.

In 1926, the Ontario Association of Architects awarded Lyle its Gold Medal of Honour for his design of the Thornton-Smith Building (1922) on Yonge Street in Toronto. Two years later, he was elected a Fellow of the Royal Institute of British Architects. From 1941 to 1944, he served as president of the Art Gallery of Ontario.

Most of Lyle's projects were in Toronto and other parts of Ontario (and mostly for banks, especially Dominion Bank), but completed projects in New Brunswick, Alberta, Nova Scotia. He submitted proposals for competition for two buildings in United States (1 in Providence, RI and another Chicago), but he did not win either one.

John M. Lyle died in Toronto on 20 December 1945.

Lyle's best-known contribution is Royal Alexandra Theatre, completed in 1907 in the Beaux-Arts style. It was renovated in 1963 and remains one of the city's valued arts venues.

Lyle designed the granite and Indiana limestone Memorial Arch at the Royal Military College of Canada, whose two large bronze tablets bear the names of the ex-cadets who gave their lives for their country in World War I. The stone was laid by Governor-General of Canada, Viscount Byng, of Vimy, CGB KCMG MVO 25 June 1923; Nominal rolls of Cadets and Staff, pamphlets concerning the Arch, the RMCC Review of May 1923, Canadian coins and stamps and the Roll of Honour of the College are in a sealed copper box.

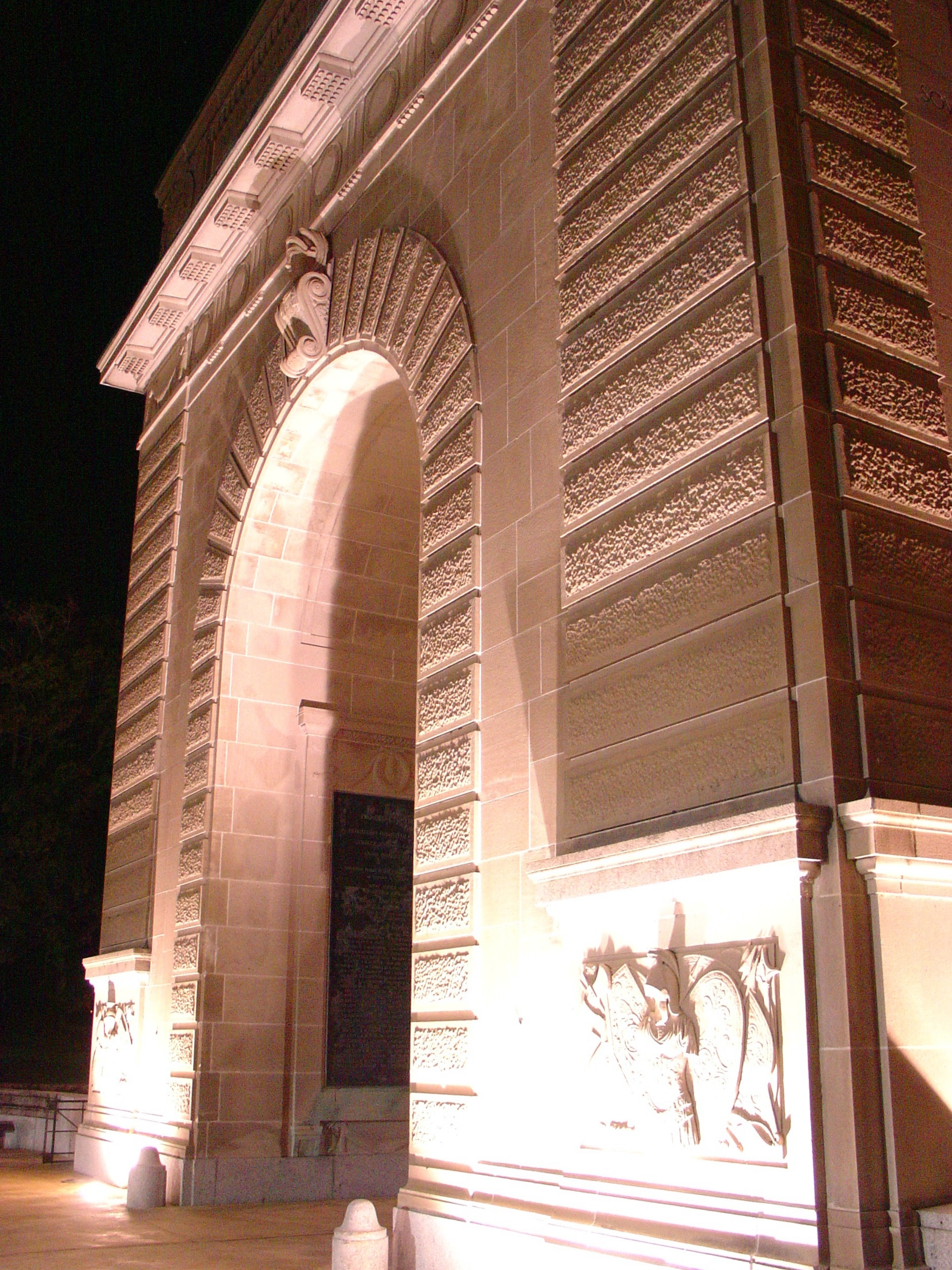
Royal Military College of Canada Memorial Arch

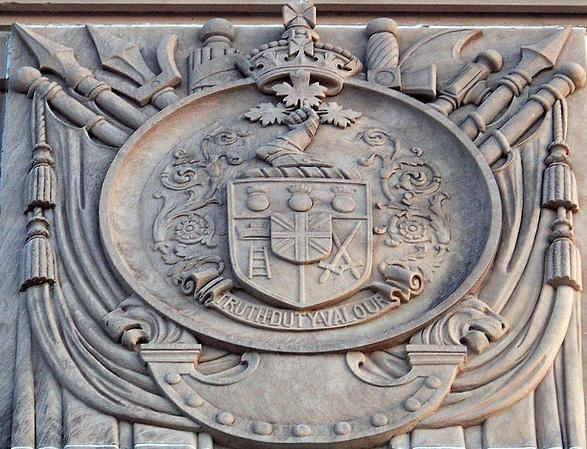
Royal Military College of Canada Arms detail on the Memorial Arch

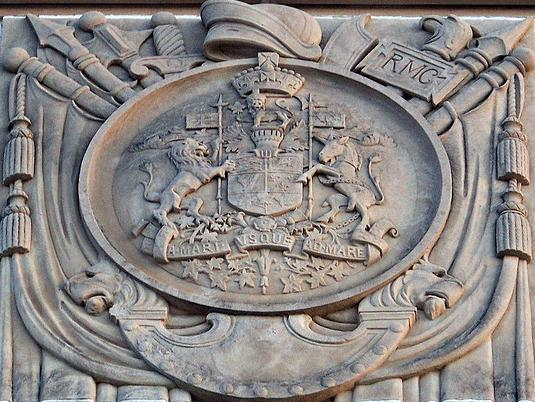
Canadian Coat of Arms detail on Memorial Arch (by John M Lyle) Royal Military College of Canada

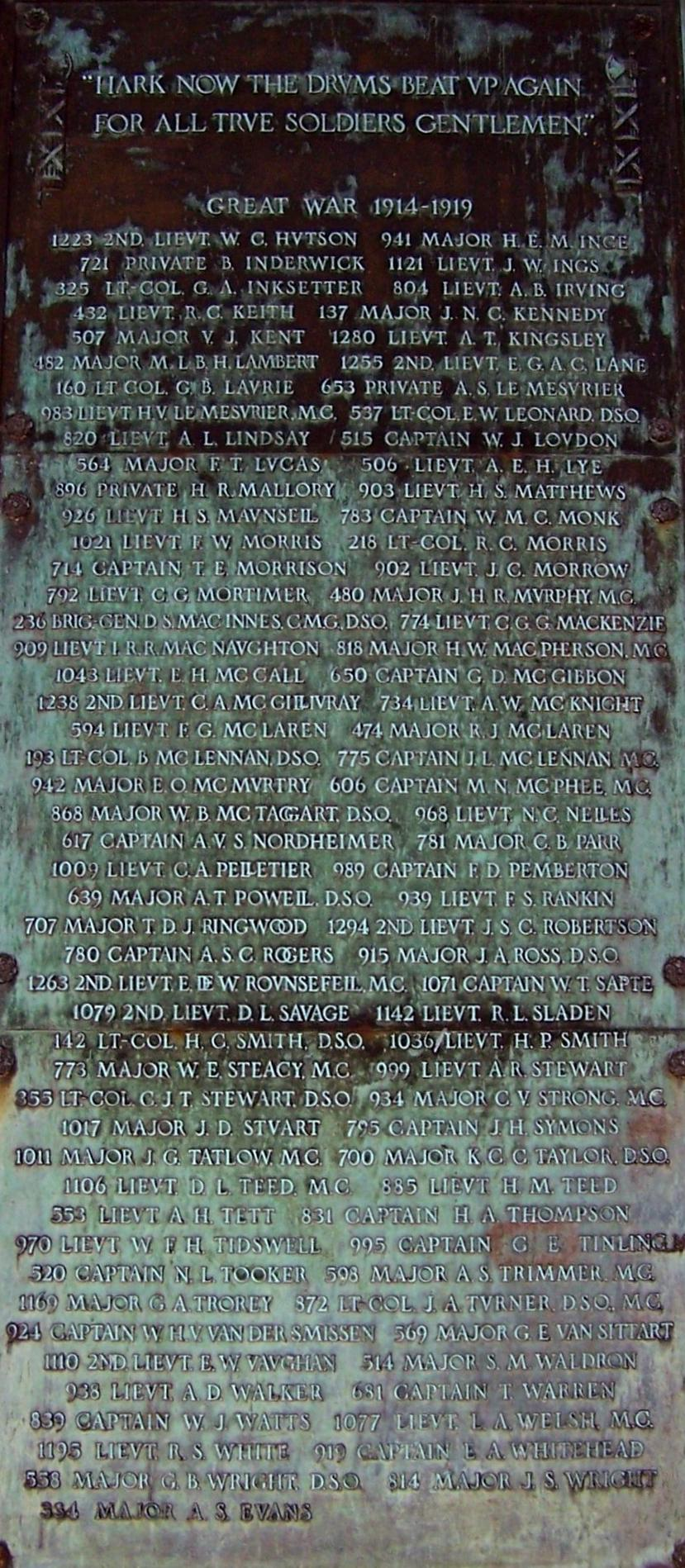
Royal Military College of Canada plaque on Memorial Arch to Great War 1914–1919

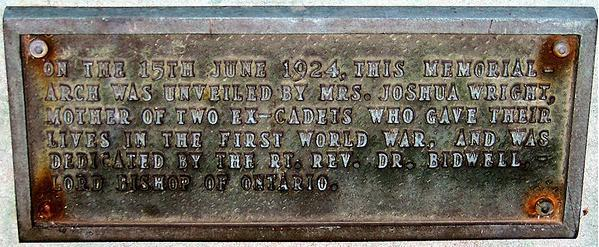
Memorial Arch plaque unveiling Royal Military College of Canada

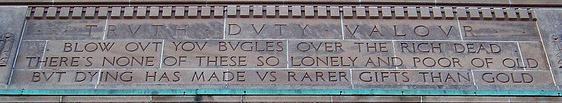
Blow out your bugles, detail on Memorial Arch (by John M Lyle) at Royal Military College of Canada

== Works ==
| Project | Location | Dates | Notes | Source | Image |
|---|---|---|---|---|---|
| Royal Alexandra Theatre | 284 King Street West, Toronto | 1907 | Beaux Arts | W | |
| Central Presbyterian Church | Hamilton, Ontario | 1908 | Beaux-Arts | | |
| Cobalt railway station | Cobalt, Ontario | 1910 | | | |
| John B. Maclean House | 7 Austin Terrace, Toronto | 1911 | Georgian Revival. Built for John Bayne Maclean. Facade retained (remaining structure demolished; was altered after 1950) during conversion to townhouses in 2011. | | |
| Maclean Publishing Building | Toronto | 1913 | Demolished | | |
| John Lyle Studio | Toronto | 1920 | Beaux-Arts. All but facade demolished to make way for One Bedford condos in 2006. | | |
| The Thornton-Smith Building | 340 Yonge Street, Toronto | 1922 | Beaux-Arts. Lyle won the Ontario Association of Architects' Gold Medal of Honour for this building in 1926. | | |
| Commemorative Arch | Royal Military College of Canada, Kingston, Ontario | 1923 | Beaux-Arts | | |
| Bank of Nova Scotia | 125 Sparks Street, Ottawa | 1923 | Beaux-Arts | | |
| Union Station | Front Street West, Toronto | 1915–1927 | In the Beaux-Arts style, Canada's most monumental railway station. G.A. Ross and R.H. Macdonald, Hugh Jones (CPR), and John M. Lyle. | W | |
| Gage Park Memorial Fountain | Gage Park, Hamilton | 1927 | Beaux-Arts | | |
| Bank of Nova Scotia | 125 8 Avenue SW, Calgary | 1929 | Beaux-Arts | | |
| Bank of Nova Scotia head office and Halifax main branch | 1709 Hollis Street, Halifax, Nova Scotia | 1929–1931 | Beaux-Arts (A rare example of Renaissance inspired structure) | | |
| Runnymede Library | Toronto | 1930 | A branch of the Toronto Public Library. Incorporates elements of English and French colonial architecture in Canada and uses Canadian imagery for ornamentation. | | |
| Cowan House | 174 Teddington Park Avenue, Lawrence Park, Toronto | 1931 | Tudor Revival. Built for industrialist Frederick Cowan. | | |
| Whitney Hall | University College, Toronto | 1930–31 | Georgian Revival university residence. | | |
| Thomas B. McQuesten High Level Bridge | Hamilton, Ontario | 1932 | Beaux-Arts monumental entrance bridge to the city of Hamilton, characteristic of the City Beautiful movement. | | |
| Bank of Nova Scotia head office | Toronto | 1951 | Designed in 1928 and built after Lyle's death to a modified design. | | |
