= Agar Adamson =

Canadian military officer (1865–1929)

Agar Adamson DSO
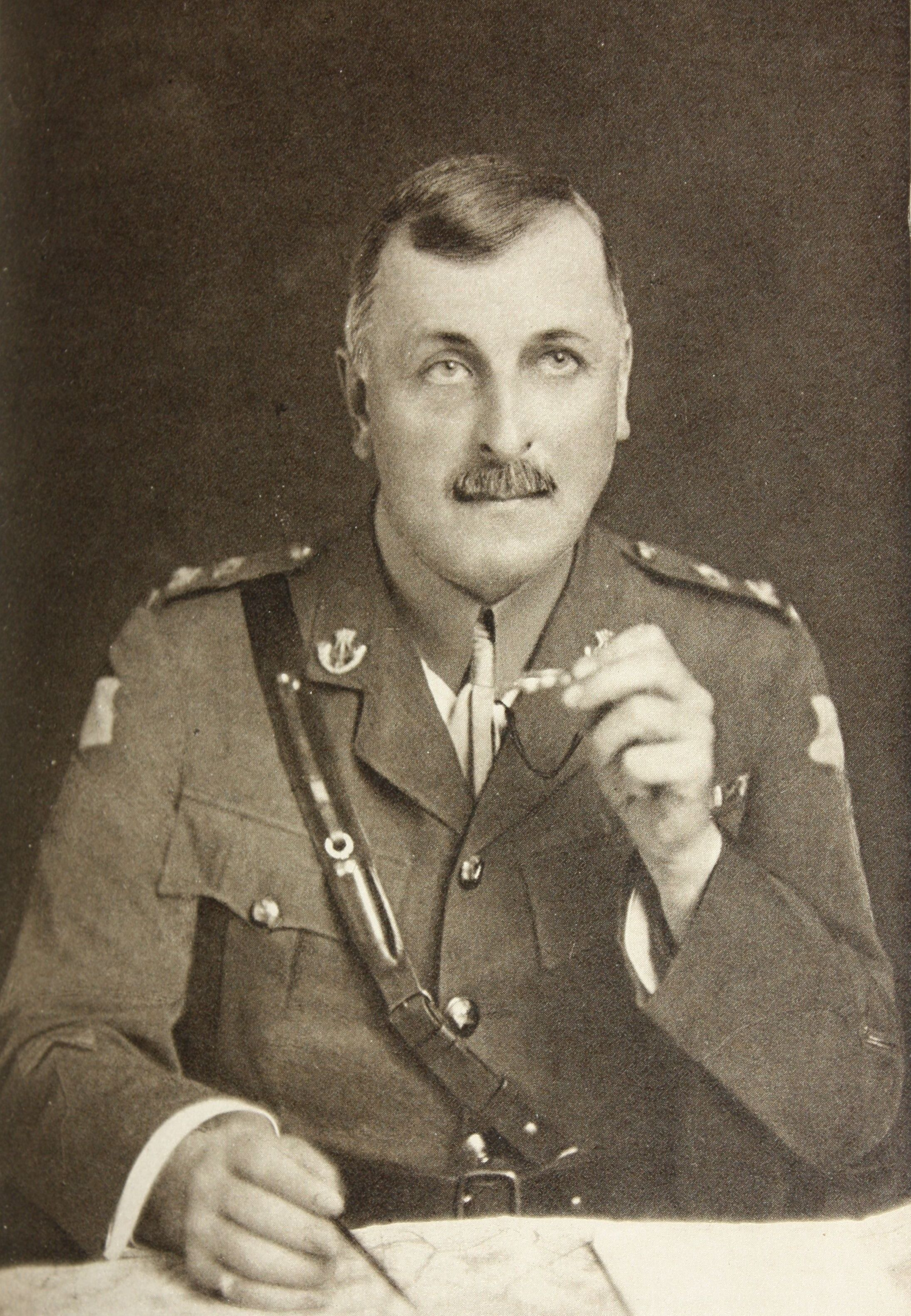
- Lieutenant-colonel Adamson c.1917
- Born: 25 December 1865; Ottawa, Canada West (now Canadian Capital Region, Ontario)
- Died: 21 November 1929 (aged 63); London, England
- Resting place: Trinity Anglican Church Cemetery, Port Credit, Ontario
- Occupations: Civil servant, soldier
- Known for: Commander of the Princess Patricia's Canadian Light Infantry
- Military Service
- Allegiance: Canada
- Branch: Canadian Militia; Canadian Expeditionary Force
- Service years: 1893 - 1903; 1914 - 1917
- Rank: 2nd Lieutenant; Captain; Lieutenant-Colonel
- Units: Governor General's Foot Guards; 3rd (Special Service) Battalion, RCRI; Lord Strathcona's Horse; 6th Canadian Mounted Rifles; Princess Patricia's Canadian Light Infantry
- Conflicts: Second Boer War: Battle of Wolve Spruit; Occupation of Machadodorp; First World War: Second Battle of Ypres (WIA); Battle of Mont Sorrel; Battle of Vimy Ridge; Battle of Passchendaele (WIA)

Agar Stewart Allan Masterton Adamson DSO (25 December 1865 – 21 November 1929) was a Canadian soldier who commanded the Princess Patricia's Canadian Light Infantry from 1916 to 1918, during World War I. Born into a well-connected Upper Canadian family, he married the Toronto heiress Mabel Cawthra. He fought in the Second Boer War and in World War I. Adamson served with distinction in the Second Boer War, where he recommended Sergeant Arthur Herbert Lindsay Richardson for the Victoria Cross. During World War I, he was awarded the Distinguished Service Order for conspicuous bravery and led his regiment in significant battles including Vimy Ridge and Passchendaele before resigning his command due to health issues. After the war, he designed and built a Belgian-style mansion in Lakeview, Ontario, before moving to France in 1921. Adamson died on November 21, 1929, from complications following an experimental airplane crash in the Irish Sea.

== Early years ==
Agar Stewart Allan Masterton Adamson was born in Ottawa on 25 December 1865. He was the second and last son of James Adamson and Mary Julia Derbishire. He came from a well-connected Upper Canada family. His paternal grandfather was William Agar Adamson, an Anglo-Irish parson who came to Canada in 1840 and was chaplain to the Governor, Lord Sydenham. His maternal grandfather was Stuart Derbishire, who came to Canada in 1838 as a confidential agent of Lord Durham and was the first elected representative for Bytown (now Ottawa) for the Province of Canada. His father was a lawyer in Ottawa and clerk of the Senate of Canada.

Adamson had a privileged childhood and was educated at the private Trinity College School in Port Hope, Ontario. He then studied in Corpus Christi College, Cambridge, originally planning to enter the church. He was an excellent athlete, played field sports and rowed, and won the Newmarket Stakes on his own horse. He did not obtain a degree.

After returning to Canada, on 4 February 1890 Adamson became a junior clerk of the Senate. He threw himself into the social life of Ottawa. In 1893, he obtained a commission as 2nd lieutenant in the Number 4 Company of the Governor General's Foot Guards, a militia regiment. He had reached the rank of captain of militia by 1899. Most of his military duties were ceremonial. On 15 November 1899, he married Ann Mabel Cawthra (1871–1943) in Toronto. She was an heiress and a talented artist, with an independent personality. They had two sons.

His wife's family owned a huge amount of property in the western part of Toronto.

== Second Boer War ==
After his marriage Adamson was transferred to Halifax, Nova Scotia, to serve with the 3rd (Special Service) Battalion, Royal Canadian Regiment of Infantry. This unit had been thrown together quickly so that the regular garrison in Halifax, the Leinster Regiment, could be released for other duties. Adamson was anxious to serve in the Second Boer War (1899–1902). In March 1900 he used his connections to obtain a position with Lord Strathcona's Horse as a lieutenant in charge of a group of fifty soldiers who were to be sent to South Africa to replace casualties. He left Halifax in late April 1900. He met his draft in Ottawa, left with them on 30 April 1900 for Montreal, and sailed for England the next day.

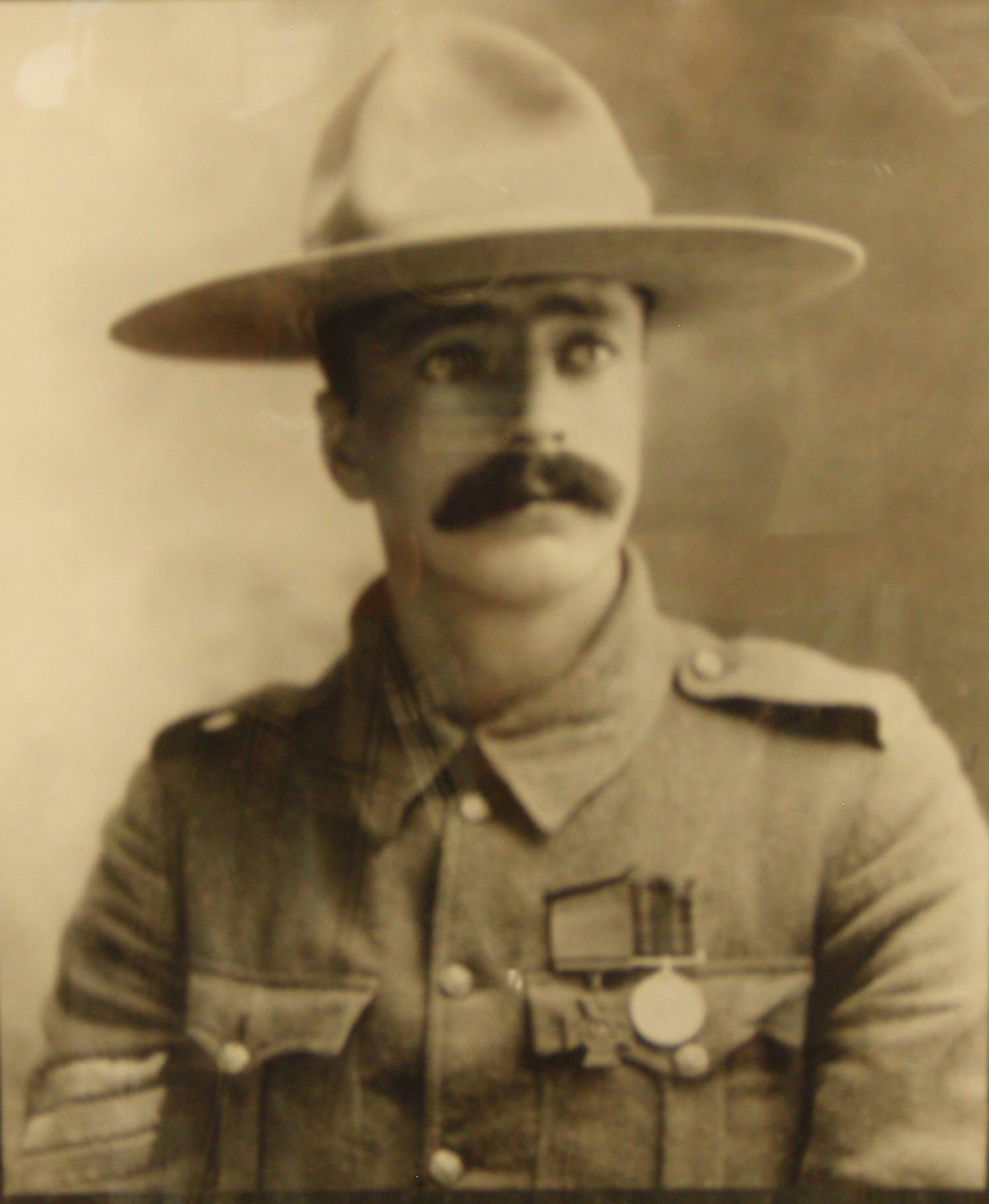
Arthur Herbert Lindsay Richardson, awarded a Victoria Cross at Adamson's recommendation

The small group, most with little or no real military experience, traveled without incident via Liverpool and London to Cape Town. They reached South Africa early in June 1900. After a stay at Maitland camp, they sailed via Port Elizabeth and East London for Durban, Natal, to join the Natal Field Force led by General Redvers Buller. Adamson's troop saw action on 5 July 1900 at Wolve Spruit, where Sergeant Arthur Herbert Lindsay Richardson showed conspicuous bravery in rescuing a wounded man in face of a group of advancing Boers. After the skirmish Adamson recommended Richardson for a Victoria Cross, which was awarded. Adamson proved to be a natural leader, and was mentioned in dispatches. He was one of the first to enter Machadodorp.

Adamson fell ill in November 1900 and was sent back to England to recover. In March 1901, he was found unsuitable for further service and was sent back to Canada. Unable to settle down, in late March 1902 Adamson petitioned for a command and was appointed a junior Captain in the 6th Regiment, Canadian Mounted Rifles. By the time he returned to South Africa in May 1902 the war had ended. He wrote to his wife from Durban expressing his disappointment. A few weeks later he was ordered to return home.

== Later career ==
Adamson was unable to obtain a post as a regular officer in a British regiment after the war. He also failed in an attempt at farming, and in 1903, the Adamsons returned to Canada. In 1904, Grove Farm in Lakeview, Ontario, was granted to the Cawthras. In 1905, Adamson left the Senate and moved to Toronto, where he became nominal head of the Canadian franchise of the Thornton-Smith Company, a British decorating firm. His wife had established the franchise.

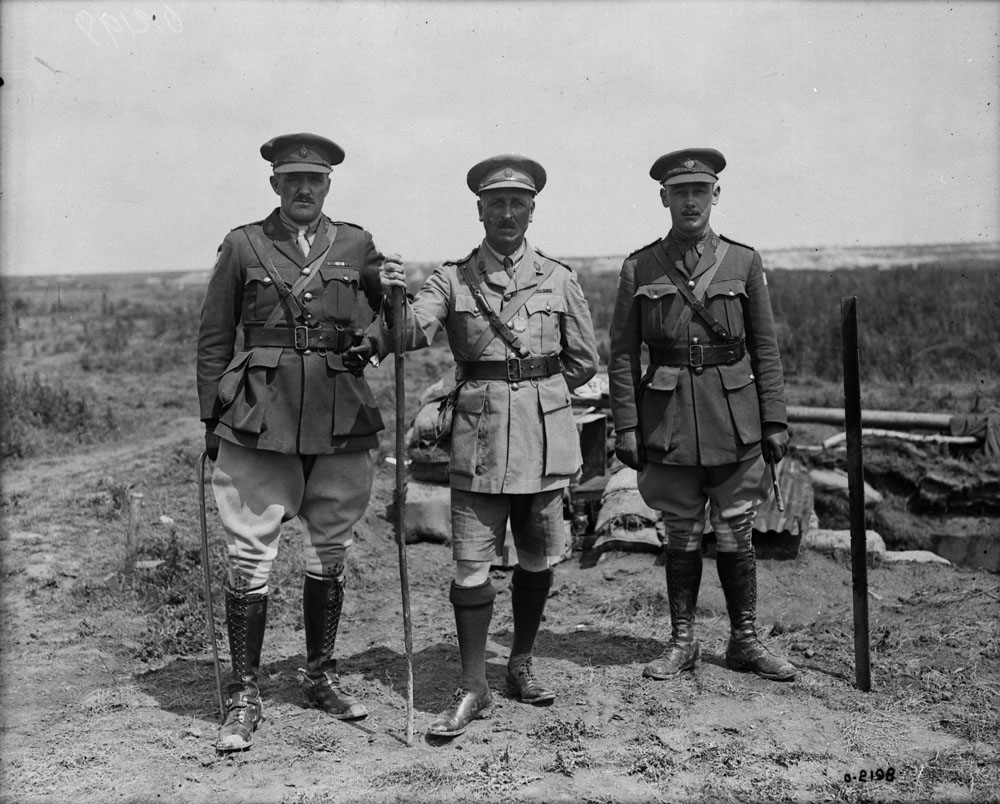
Commanding officers of the Princess Patricia's Canadian Light Infantry at Passchendaele, November 1917. Colonel Agar Adamson, the CO of the PPCLI, is likely in the center, with the officer on the right being Lieutenant Colonel Charles James Townshend Stewart, the unit's CO in 1918.

With the outbreak of World War I (1914–1918) Adamson immediately went to Ottawa and volunteered to serve, despite his age of 48 and poor vision in one eye. He used his connections to obtain a post as a captain in the Princess Patricia's Canadian Light Infantry, and reached England with this regiment in October 1914. He wrote daily letters to his wife during his three years in the trenches. They give a vivid and honest account of his war experiences. He was awarded the Distinguished Service Order for conspicuous bravery. He was wounded in the shoulder, but returned to his regiment in early 1916, and on 31 October 1916 was appointed regimental commander and promoted to lieutenant-colonel. Under his leadership the regiment fought with distinction at Vimy Ridge and Passchendaele.

In 1917, Adamson caught trench fever and spent a week in hospital. Later he was back in hospital to recover from mustard gas. He was forced to wear a monocle to supplement his good eye, and even with that had difficulty moving around the trenches at night. He had to resign. He wrote to his wife "The brigadier was very nice about it. Whoever is in command should be full of health and youth." Adamson was 52 when he resigned his command. The stated reason was his wife's poor health, but the real reason was his own nervous exhaustion.

== Last years ==
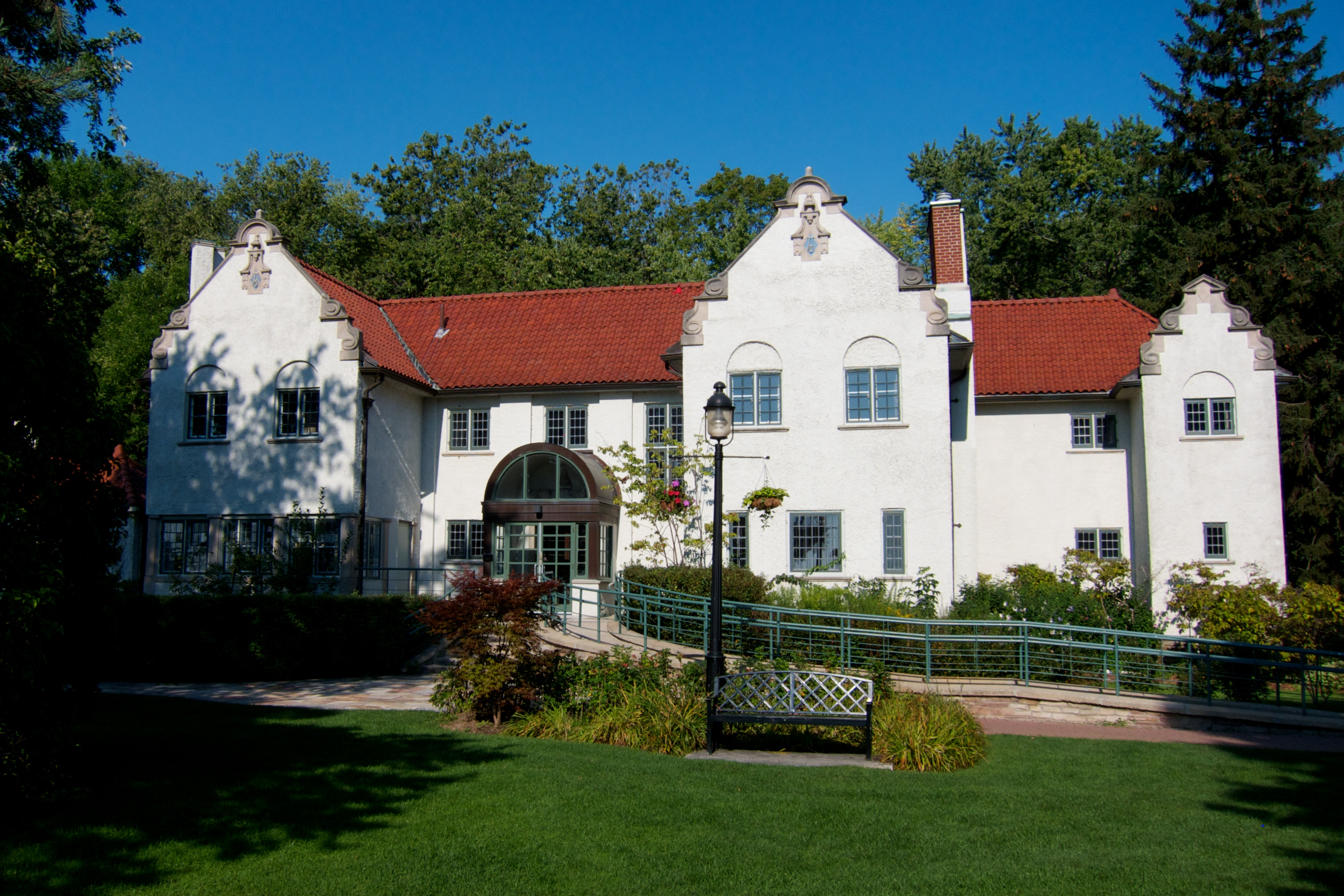
Adamson Estate in Lakeview (today part of Mississauga)

Adamson designed and built the Belgian-style mansion in 1919

Adamson's wife, Mabel, had been helping in London and with civilian refugees behind the lines in Belgium when she became ill. She soon recovered, but Adamson now became affected by posttraumatic stress disorder, causing depression and lack of judgement.

His marriage broke down, although there was no divorce.

Adamson returned to Canada in March 1919.

In 1919, Adamson designed and built a baronial mansion in the Belgian style at Lakeview, Ontario on land the Adamsons had been given as a wedding present. In 1921 he went to live in France. In October 1929, he was a passenger in an experimental airplane that crashed into the Irish Sea. Adamson survived two hours in the bitterly cold water, but died a few weeks later on 21 November 1929 in London, England.

His son Agar Rodney Adamson (1901–1954) was federal member of Parliament for York West from 1940 to 1954, and like his father, also died in a plane crash. His second son Anthony Patrick Cawthra Adamson (1906–2002) was an architect, associate professor of town planning at the University of Toronto, chairman of the Ontario Arts Council, designer of Upper Canada Village, and a member of the Order of Canada.
