= William Cawthra =

Canadian businessman and philanthropist

William Cawthra (29 October 1801 – 26 October 1880) was a philanthropist, business and civic leader and the eldest son of Joseph Cawthra. William, like his father, was associated with reformists and was considered anti-establishment, notwithstanding his wealth. William was elected to Toronto City Council as the Alderman for St. Lawrence Ward in 1836, a position his father held for one year until he was unseated in 1835 by conservative opposition.

William married his widow Sarah Ellen Crowther Cawthra in 1849. His brothers John and Jonathan Cawthra served in the War of 1812 at Detroit and Queenston under Sir Isaac Brock. John Cawthra later served as an MHA and as the first Member of Parliament for Simcoe County.

== Business success ==
William worked alongside his father Joseph in their family's business - Toronto's first apothecary. When Joseph died in 1842, he left most of his money to William who shut the business down and concentrated on investments and charity work.

William eventually became the wealthiest man in Toronto, serving as a Director of the Bank of Toronto and owned a number of companies. He and his wife lived in a townhouse at the corner of King and Bay Streets (the current site of the Bank of Nova Scotia's main headquarters). This house has been recognized as the most beautiful ever built in Canada, but was torn down in 1946 to make way for the Scotia Plaza. (Anthony Patrick Cawthra Adamson, a descendant of Joseph Cawthra, tried to rescue the mansion from demolition, but failed. He managed to save some architectural elements from the house and installed them in his Rosedale, Toronto garden).

== Philanthropy and city-building ==
William Cawthra is credited, alongside James Gooderham Worts and William Gooderham, Sr., with establishing Canada's first infectious disease centre at the Toronto General Hospital. William was a founding and active member of the Toronto House of Industry, established in 1837 with a similar model to Dickensian workhouses, helping those in the city who were desperate for food, distributing coal to assist the needy to survive the harsh Toronto winters, providing temporary and permanent accommodations and assisting abandoned children or those who were orphans. William was also a patron of the Fenian Raids Volunteer Fund, St. James Cathedral and numerous other charities.

Toronto's first city hall (now the St. Lawrence Market) was mortgaged to Cawthra, and when the Jarvis Family lacked the funds to finish Jarvis street, they turned to him for assistance. He gave them the money in return for a northwest portion of their property in what is now the North Jarvis and Church and Wellesley neighbourhoods.

Toronto author and historian Henry Scadding said in an address at a meeting of the York Pioneers' Association (now the York Pioneer and Historical Society) that William Cawthra was "one of the necessary constituents of the ideal conception of Toronto".

== Legacy ==
William Cawthra died without heirs, leaving an estate estimated between $2,000,000 and $3,000,000 which was divided between his wife and his nieces and nephews. This fortune allowed the construction of many mansions on Jarvis Street and elsewhere which factor significantly in the architectural heritage of the North Jarvis Street district and established his family among the City's social elite. His beautiful house at King and Bay long remained as his monument, but he is a political and business figure of whom there is little record or history with the exception of a small square and a city park.

Cawthra's property at Church and Wellesley Streets was home to the city's lacrosse club and the first baseball club at the Old Lacrosse Fields from 1872 to 1890. The property was redeveloped for homes and a church on a public road known as Cawthra Square. This site was further redeveloped in 1971 with the construction of Plaza 100 on the former site of the Church.

=== Former Cawthra Square Park ===
A park formerly known as Cawthra Square Park, in the city's Church and Wellesley neighbourhood, adjoining Cawthra's former Jarvis Street properties, was named for him. The street to the north of the park, now named Monteith Street, was also once called Cawthra Avenue. In May 2014, Toronto City Councillor Kristyn Wong-Tam proposed the renaming of Cawthra Square Park to "Barbara Hall Park" after former City of Toronto Mayor Barbara Hall. The proposal was approved by Toronto and East York Community Council.
