= Port Credit =

- Neighbourhood
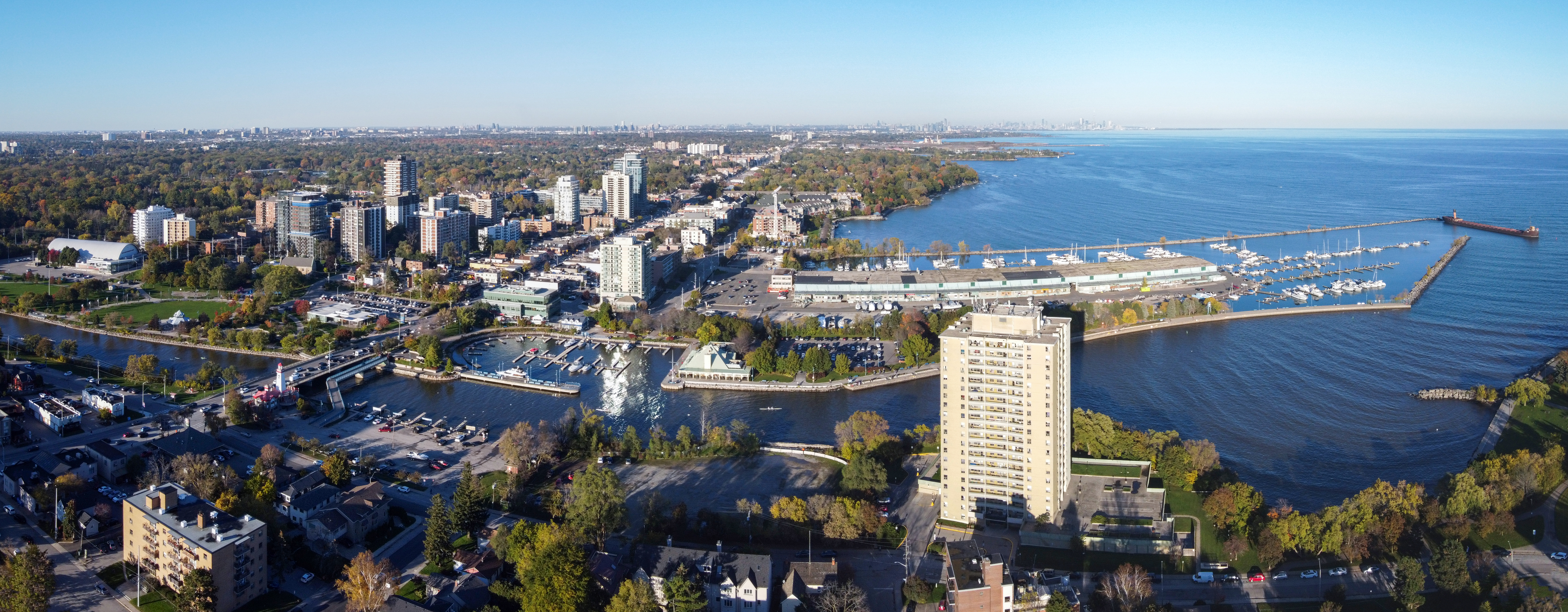
- Aerial view of Port Credit (2021)
- Interactive map of Port Credit
- Coordinates: 43°33′7″N 79°35′4″W
- Country: Canada
- Province: Ontario
- Regional municipality: Peel
- City: Mississauga
- Settled: 1834
- Established: 1909 (Police village); 1962 (Town)
- Changed Division: 1974 Peel Region from Peel County
- Amalgamated: 1974 into Mississauga

Government
  - MP: Charles Sousa (Mississauga—Lakeshore)
  - MPP: Rudy Cuzzetto (Mississauga—Lakeshore)
  - Councillors: Stephen Dasko (Ward 1)
- Postal code: L5G and L5H

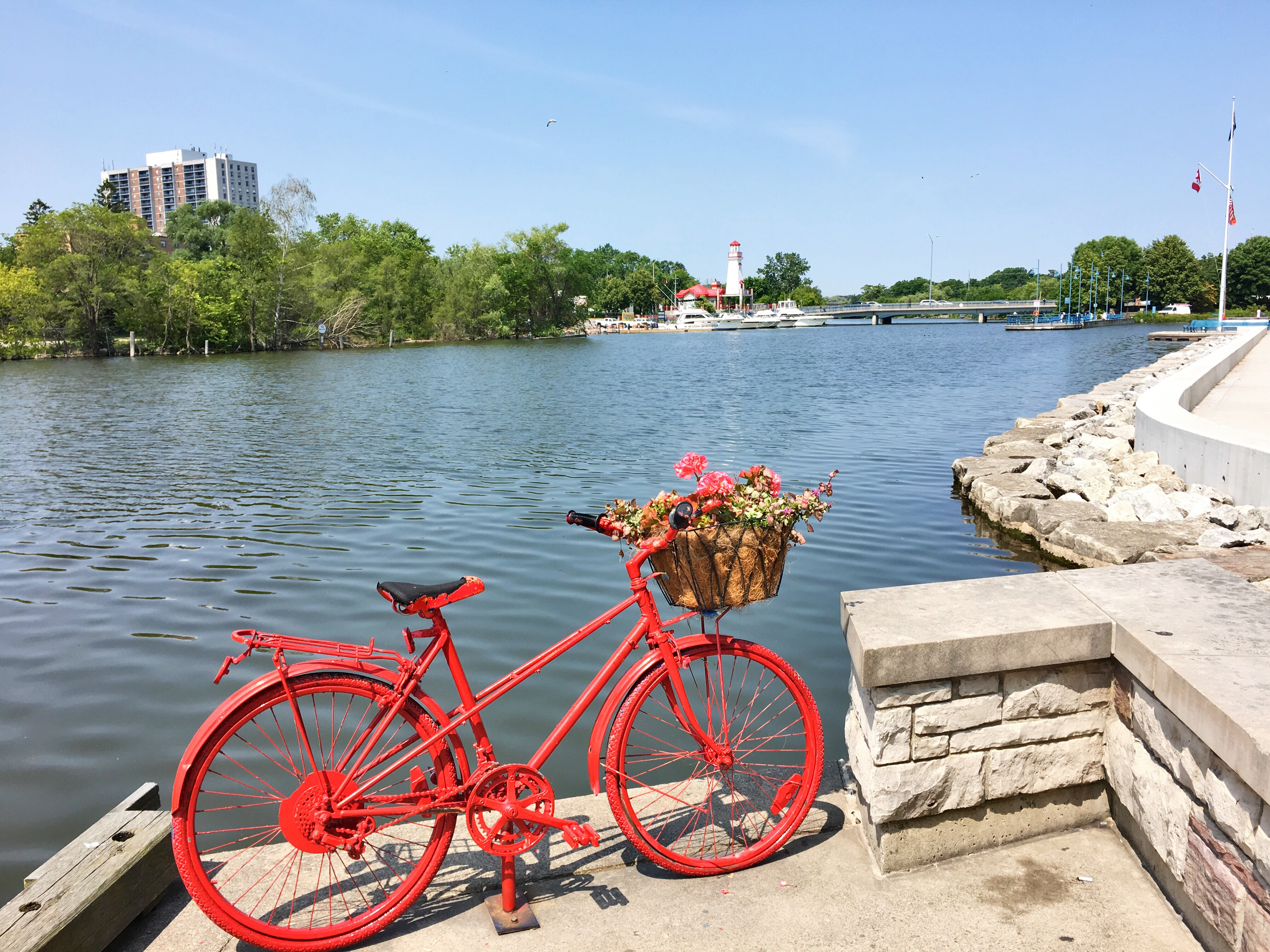
Scene of Port Credit marina with the lighthouse replica in the background

Port Credit is a neighbourhood in the south-central part of the City of Mississauga, Ontario, Canada, located at the mouth of the Credit River on the north shore of Lake Ontario. Its main intersection is Hurontario Street and Lakeshore Road, about 0.6 kilometres (0.37 mi) east of the river. Until 1974, Port Credit was an incorporated town. Its approximate boundaries are the Canadian National Railway to the north, Seneca Avenue to the east and Shawnmarr Road to the west. It had a population of 10,260 at the 2001 census.

Port Credit was originally a settlement of the Mississauga Ojibwe First Nations band and a trading post established in 1720 for the exchange of goods from the Europeans for furs trapped by the Mississaugas. After the War of 1812, a harbour was established by the Mississaugas together with European and Jamaican settlers. In 1847, the Mississaugas left the village to relocate on the Six Nations Reserve to be with other band members and first nations. Industry was established on the village periphery including an oil refinery, but the neighbourhood is no longer a substantial industrial district. The village survived into the 20th century, becoming an independent municipality in 1909, until it was merged with the City of Mississauga in 1974.

Today, the original core village is now a heritage conservation district. The harbour is mostly used for recreational boating.

In recent years, the population of Port Credit has increased significantly from condo developments as well as gaining summer attraction from other Mississauga neighbourhoods. A former Imperial Oil property has been cleaned-up and remediated to support residential growth. The 72 arce development will add as many as 3,900 residential units over ground-level retail units. Concerns have been raised about the development's impact on local traffic.

== History ==
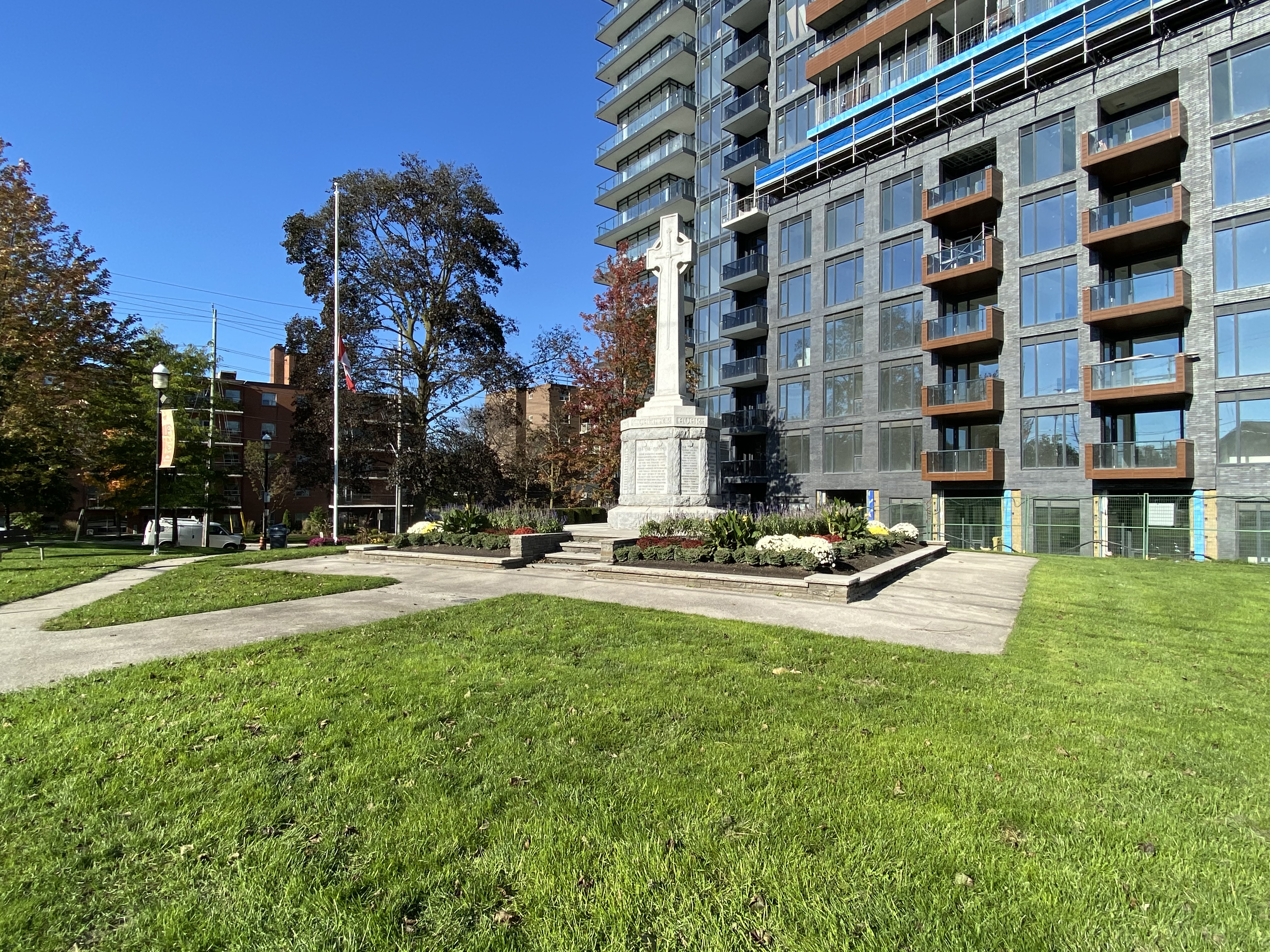
Cenotaph Park

The location of Port Credit was in the 1700s, the land of the Mississauga Ojibwe Indigenous people. The location became used as a meeting place between the band and white traders, and the river was known to them as the Missinhe or "trusting creek". To the French and later the English the mouth was known as "Port Credit" and a trading post was established in 1720, where goods were traded or bought on credit. The earliest reference is on a map drawn in 1757 by La Broquerie.

The first permanent structure built by the English at the site was the Government Inn (1798–1861), on the east bank of the river. Lieutenant Governor John Graves Simcoe had ordered construction of the Inn to serve as a way station for travellers by land and lake, and it was leased to a succession of residents until its destruction by fire.

In 1805, the Mississauga gave up much of the surrounding lands, but retained the Credit River, which they held in esteem as the favourite resort of their ancestors. After the War of 1812, the numbers of Mississauga dwindled and they gave up their lands except for a reserve at the mouth, believing the King would protect the land for them in the face of settler encroachment.

Outside the reserve, a village plan was laid out in 1834 and for several years, Port Credit was a thriving harbour community used by the natives and settlers jointly. Village lots were sold to settlers by the natives and the Port Credit Harbour Company, which developed the harbour, was jointly owned. The harbour was a working fishing port and a regional trading centre for grain and other agricultural products. A lighthouse was in use from 1882 to 1918 and remained standing until destroyed by fire in 1936.

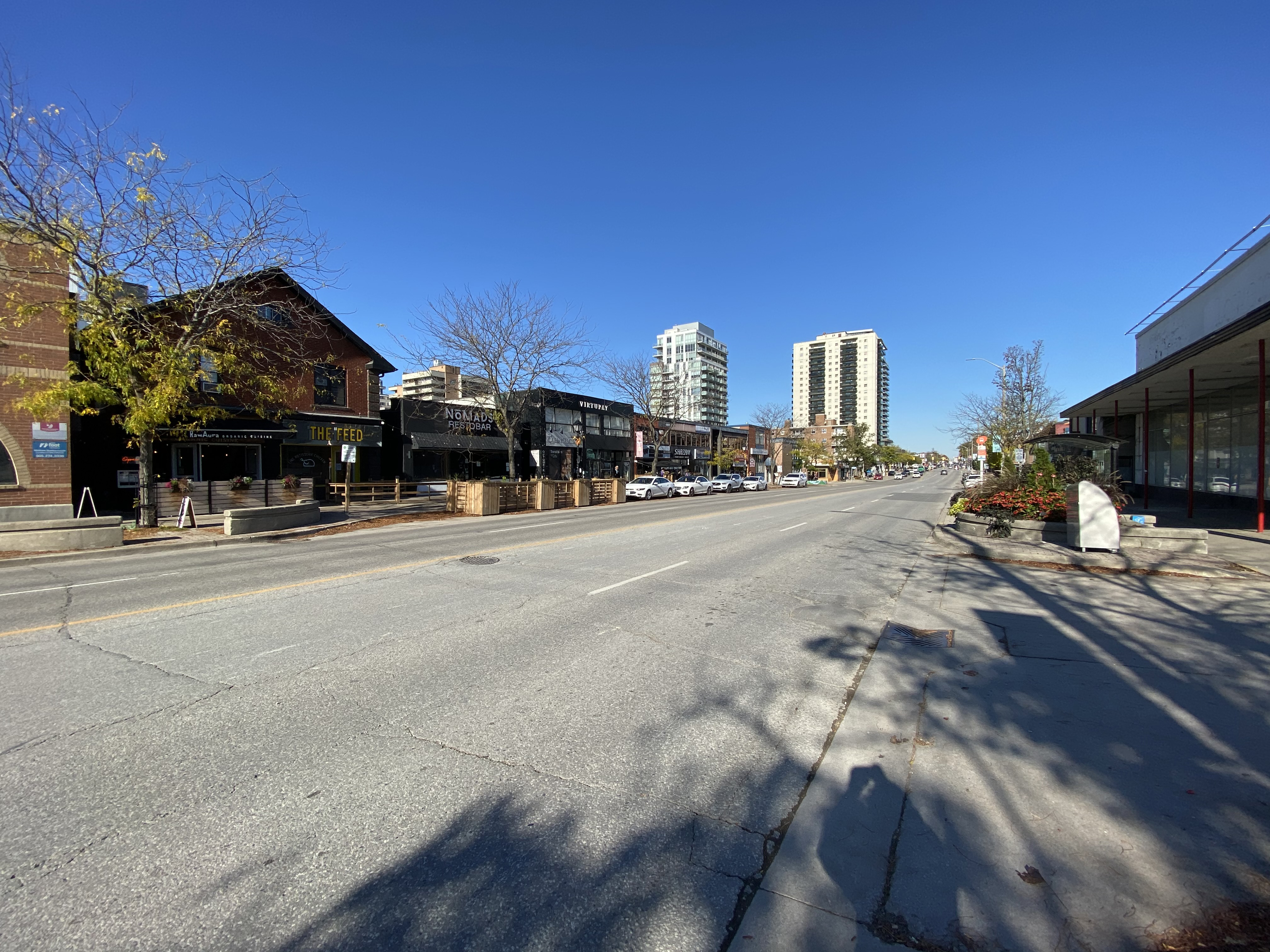
Lakeshore Road west of Hurontario Street

On the reserve, a sawmill was set up and timber shipped by schooner to locations around the lake. The Credit Mission was set up by Indigenous leader Peter Jones and the Methodist Church to provide education and Christian studies. One of its missionaries was Egerton Ryerson. However, by the late 1840s, the forest had been cleared and conditions on the reserve declined. Negotiations were started by the British to move the Mississauga to a reserve near Owen Sound. When the location around Owen Sound was found unsuitable for farming, the Mississauga accepted an offer to move to the Six Nations reserve and left in 1847.

By 1846, the population was about 150. Large quantities of agricultural products were being shipped from the port, and vessels were being built here. Two steamers stopped here between Hamilton and Toronto. The community had two stores, two taverns, a Methodist chapel and a post office. A large area of 4600 acres beside the village was a First Nations Reserve with a chapel and a school.

The port was supplanted as a trading centre for shipping by the coming of the railway. Later in the 19th century, it became known for its stonehooking trade. Other industries such as the St. Lawrence Starch Works (1889–1989) and the Port Credit Brick Yard (1891–1927) provided employment for many local residents. In 1932 L.B. Lloyd built an oil refinery on the old brick yard site and operated by a succession of operators culminating in its purchase by a division of Texaco who operated it until its closing in 1985, when Texaco opened a new much larger facility at Nanticoke on Lake Erie. The tallest structure in Port Credit used to be the 320-foot-tall (98 m) smokestack at the St Lawrence Starch plant which has since been demolished. The stack falling marked the change of Port Credit into a residential area from the former industrial hub.

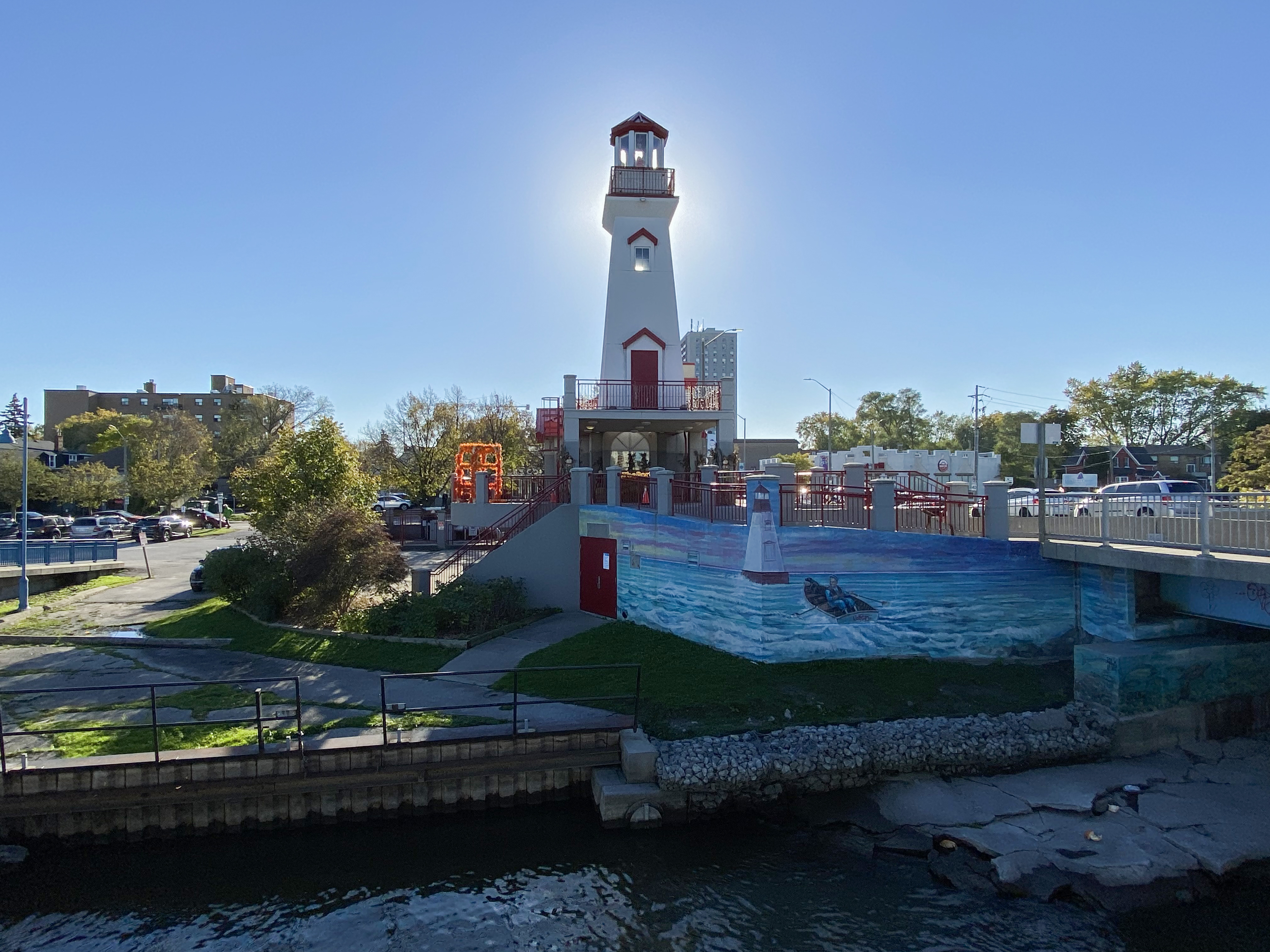
Port Credit Lighthouse

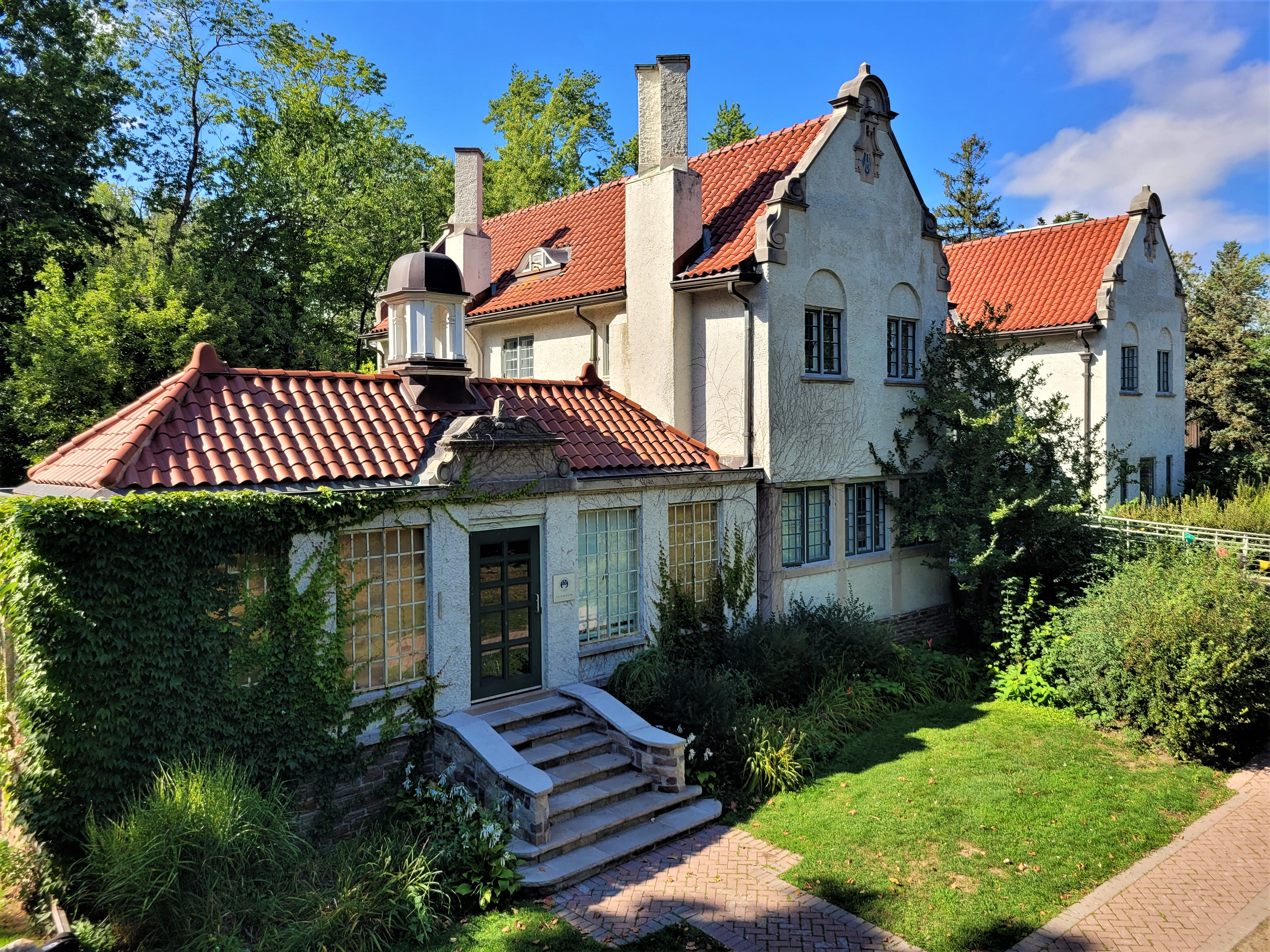
Adamson Estate

Port Credit acquired the status of a "police village" in 1909. In the late 19th and early 20th centuries, particularly after an interurban radial line operated by the Toronto and Mimico Electric Railway and Light Company was extended from Toronto to Port Credit along Lakeshore Road beginning in 1892, Port Credit had become an attractive location for businesses and people wishing to leave the city of Toronto in summer. This led to the community becoming a streetcar suburb of Toronto, with urbanization along the Lakeshore corridor in Port Credit and the adjacent community of Lakeview increasing following the paving of Lakeshore Road (later Highway 2) in 1915. The interurban line was taken over by the Toronto Transportation Commission (TTC) in 1928, but was closed in 1935 when Lakeshore was widened, which required the removal of its tracks through Port Credit and Lakeview. The line was replaced by TTC bus service until 1976, when service along Lakeshore Road was taken over by Mississauga Transit (now Miway).

Port Credit's Vogue Theatre opened on Lakeshore Road in 1937 and closed in 1979. The Art-Deco theatre was repurposed (classic theatre marquee removed) and is now a restaurant/sportsbar. In 1960 the Don Rowing Club moved to the banks of the Credit River.

Despite the urbanization of the surrounding area, Port Credit remained independent, and was given town status in 1961. The town remained independent even after the Town of Mississauga was created from the township in 1968, only being amalgamated with it when it was reincorporated as the City of Mississauga in 1974.

The Adamson Estate, located near the eastern boundary of the neighbourhood, was purchased from the family of Agar Adamson by the Credit Valley Conservation Authority in 1975.

Today the harbour has been redeveloped into a marina on the east bank and a charter fishing centre and public boat launch facility on the west bank under the lighthouse. Port Credit Harbour Marina is the largest public marina in the region. The Ridgetown (launched June 24, 1905 as William E. Corey, a lake bulk freighter) has been a structure of Port Credit since June 21, 1974, when she was loaded with stone and, with her cabins and stack still in place, sunk as a breakwater for the Port Credit Harbour.

== Community ==
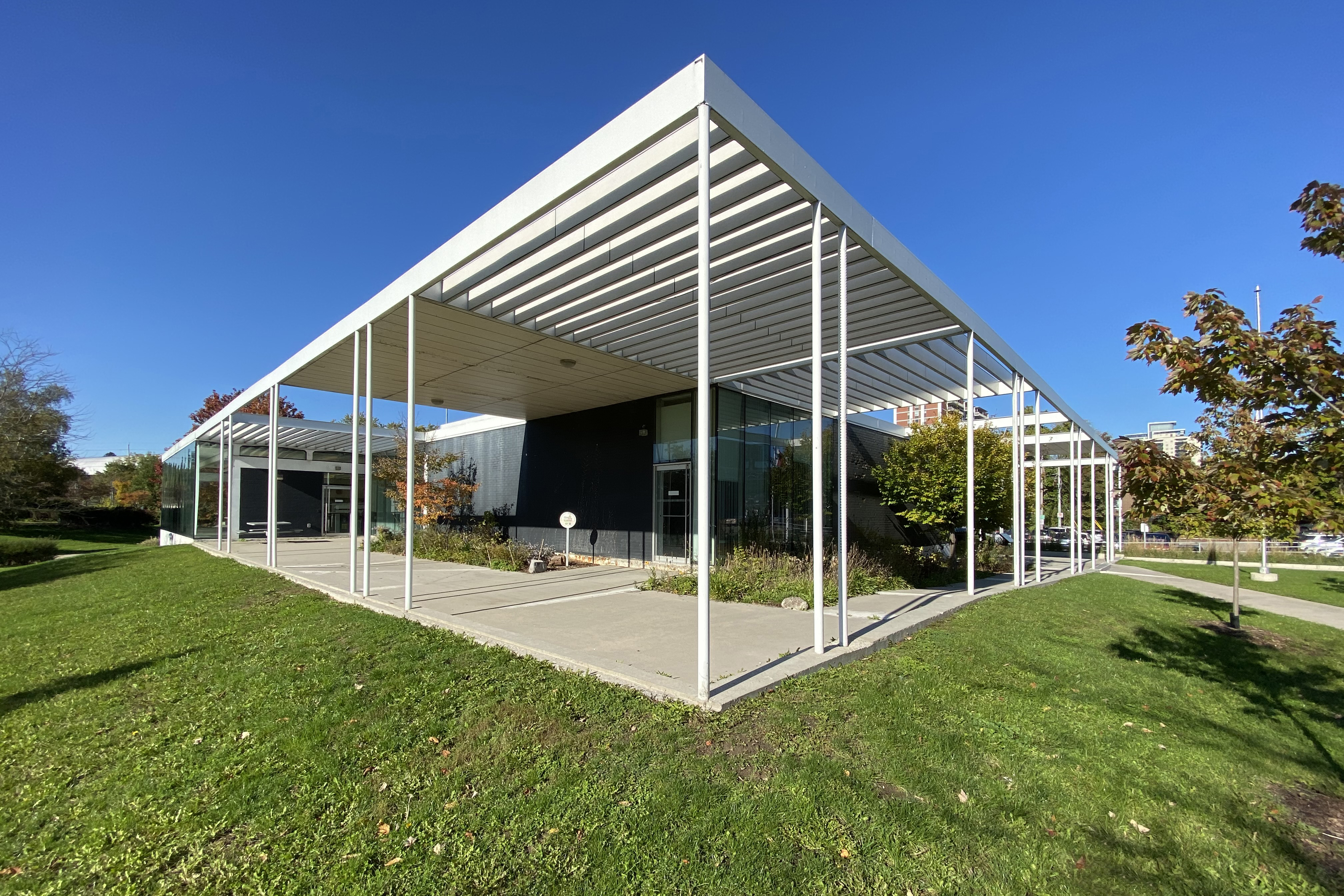
The Port Credit Library after a major renovation in 2013.

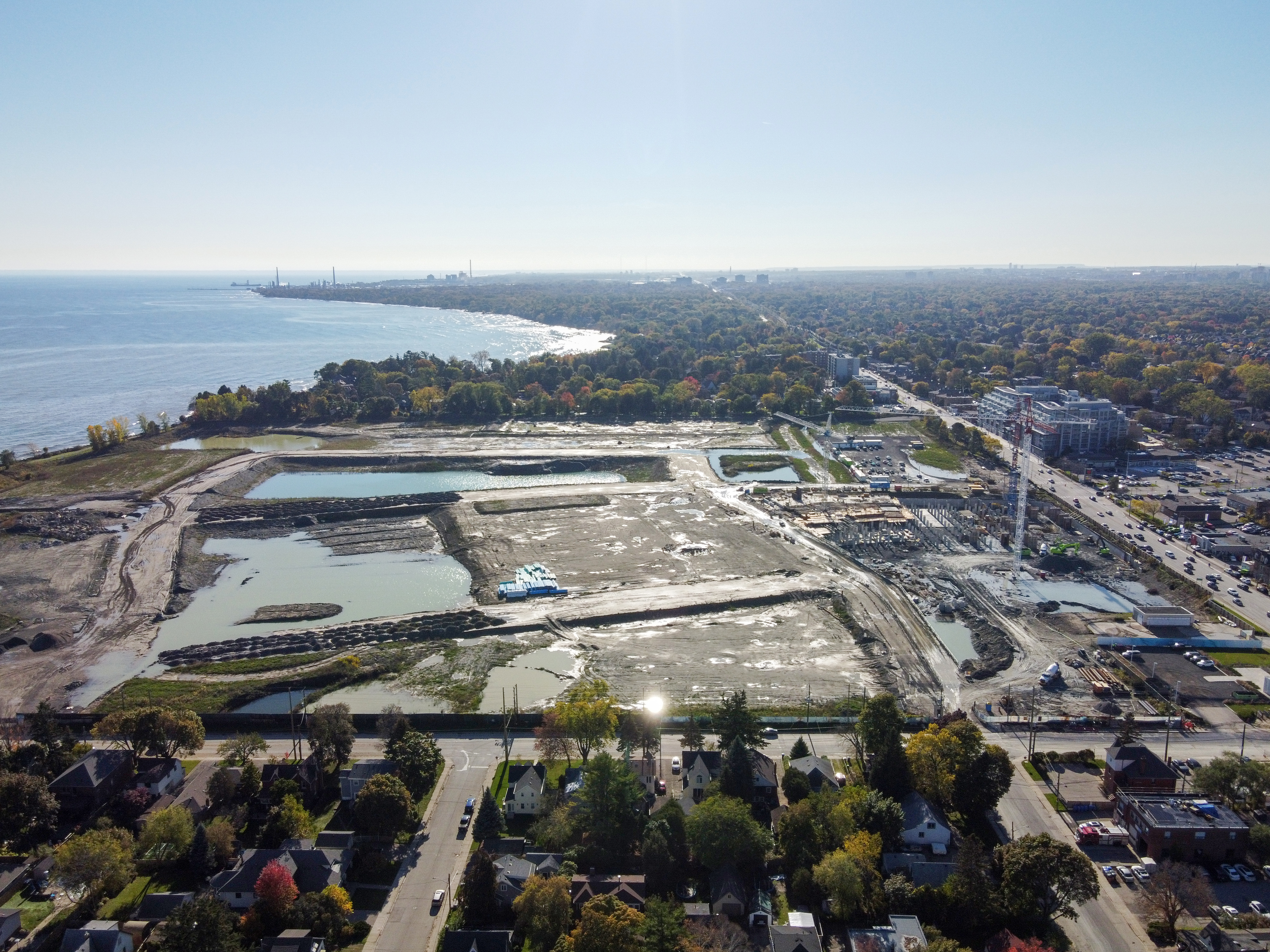
Brightwater Condos development site in 2021

The Port Credit arena was constructed between September 10, 1958, and the official opening was on October 4, 1959. Built for CA$360,000, it is the second covered arena in the current city of Mississauga, the first public arena built and is the oldest surviving arena in the city. It is the home of the Port Credit Storm hockey teams.

A replica of Port Credit's lighthouse was built by the Lions Club of Credit Valley atop a sewage pumping station; it is the home of the local BIA and Tourist Bureau and the logo for many local organizations.

The Port Credit Library, a Mid-Century Modern design, located on 20 Lakeshore Road East, sits beside the Credit River and a large public park. Along with the Lorne Park and Lakeview branches, the Port Credit Library was substantially renovated / redeveloped as part of the Government's Infrastructure Stimulus Fund beginning in 2009. The $3.1 million renovation project was completed in 2013 Due to structural issues, it was closed on June 28, 2021 and reopened in early 2024.

== Tourism ==
Port Credit is commonly referred to as Mississauga's "Village on the Lake" along Lake Ontario. The area hosts several festivals and events, notably:

- Waterfront Festival, which occurs at the end of June.
- The Port Credit In-Water Boat Show. An annual event, to be held in August, at the Port Credit Harbour Marina. Ontario's largest in-water boat show.
- Southside Shuffle is an annual three-day Blues and Jazz festival in September, founded in 1999 by Chuck Jackson. It includes the Mississauga Music Walk of Fame.
- "Port Credit's Busker Fest" held annually in August.
- The Marina is located in the center of Port Credit and provides docking for ships up to 45’ in length.
- Lakefront Promenade Marina is located Lakefront Promenade park, built in 1991. It has amenities including docking and boating facilities as well as an outdoor eatery for convenience.
- Alongside the protected harbour are 40 hectares of public land including a playground, splash pads, boardwalks, barbecues, and many more amenities.
- Port Credit and the War of 1812 – Port Credit now has scenic tours that include hearing the role of the Mississauga First Nation during the War of 1812, told by a veteran of the 2nd Regiment of the York Militia.
- Farmers Market – A farmers market takes place on Saturdays from June 15 to October 24.
- The Mississauga Waterfront Festival is an annual music festival. It started off with only 7,000 visitors since its inception in 1998 and quickly jumped to an average of over 50,000 visitors per year in 2013. The festival attracts visitors across the GTA, Ontario, and border cities in the United States. It has also received recognition as a top 100 festival in Ontario for ten years to date. With over 600 performers annually, event performers have included Sam Roberts, Jann Arden, Tom Cochrane, Chantal Kreviazuk. In 2012 the festival added the original Monster rock Orchestra Show with a set that had waterfall backdrops and a laser light show that was synchronized with the orchestra. Children's performers have included Max & Ruby, The Backyardigans, Barney the Dinosaur, Dora the Explorer, Babar the Elephant, and Shrek. Aside from entertainment performances, the event includes educational programs focused on the topics of endangered species, health and wellness, and conservation.
- Port Credit has over 225 kilometers of scenic walkways and trails that accentuate the beauty of the district.

== Transportation ==
Port Credit started as a shipping centre in 1834 with harbour improvements paid for by the government. In 1855, a branch of the Great Western Railway was added.

Lakeshore Road, formerly Highway 2, runs along the lake and Hurontario Street, formerly Highway 10, runs northwest to the Mississauga City Centre, Brampton, and beyond. Two bridges including an arch bridge over the Credit was replaced by the current two span box grider bridges.

Port Credit had access to the nearby Queen Elizabeth Way from the upgrading of the old Middle Road from Highway 27 to Highway 10 to a divided highway in 1931.

Over the years the railway has expanded to three tracks; its prime importance to Port Credit is the GO Train service carrying residents to and from Toronto. The majority of the residences are within walking distance of the Port Credit GO Station just north of the intersection of Lakeshore and Hurontario Street. This is a transportation hub of Southern Mississauga, linking both the city's public transit system; MiWay, and GO Transit.

== Notable people ==
Port Credit was the birthplace or home of:

- Anthony Adamson, architect, educator, descendant of the Adamson family
- Jill Barber, musician
- Matthew Barber, musician
- Don Biederman, former NASCAR Grand National race car driver
- Rudy Cuzzetto, politician and Member of Provincial Parliament
- Rick Dudley, professional ice hockey player and executive
- Greg Gilbert, professional ice hockey player
- Igor Gouzenko, Russian cipher clerk who defected to Canada and exposed Soviet espionage in Canada
- Dave Hilton Jr., professional boxer
- Bob Kelly, professional ice hockey player
- Winnie Leuszler, first Canadian to swim the English Channel
- M. H. Murray, filmmaker and creator of Teenagers
- Larry Patey, professional ice hockey player
- Christian Potenza, actor
- Kyle Schmid, actor
- Matt Stajan, professional ice hockey player
- Michael Young, Olympic bobsledder
- Robbie G.K., actor
