= William Agar Adamson =

Author, clergyman

Personal details
- Born: November 21, 1800 Dublin, Ireland
- Died: August 7, 1868 (aged 67)
- Occupation: Non-fiction writer
- Education: Trinity College Dublin

William Agar Adamson (21 November 1800 – 7 August 1868) was an Irish-born Canadian Church of England clergyman and author.

Adamson was born in Dublin, Ireland on 21 November 1800 to James Agar Adamson of Ballinalack, County Westmeath and Sarah Walsh of Walsh Park, County Tipperary. He had eight siblings. Adamson was admitted to Trinity College, Dublin in 1817, and graduated with a Bachelor of Arts in 1821. After graduation, he became a priest of the Church of Ireland, and in 1824, he became curate of Lockeen and Parsonstown, County Offaly. From 1833 to 1838, he was vicar of Clonlen and Ennis, both in County Clare. While in these parishes in Western Ireland, Adamson learned to enjoy angling, especially salmon fishing, an interest that would shape his life in Canada. In 1838, he became a rector of Kilcooly parish, counties Kilkenny and Tipperary, and chaplain to the Marquess of Normanby, then Whig Lord Lieutenant of Ireland.

Adamson came to Canada in 1840. With the help of Normanby's influence in the Whig ministry, Adamson obtained the incumbency of Amherst Island, Upper Canada, and became the personal chaplain to Lord Sydenham, and tended to him until his death in 1841. Later that year, Adamson became the Legislative Council of the Province of Canada's chaplain and librarian. The position was made a sinecure in 1851, and Adamson held it until 1867, when he became a Senate librarian. He only stayed there for a few months, before resigning. Shortly afterward, Adamson died in Ottawa, Ontario on 7 August 1868.

As a preacher, Adamson had been described as "one of the most eloquent in North America". He was assistant to several churches, including Christ Church Cathedral in Montreal from 1844 to 1850, Holy Trinity Anglican Cathedral in Quebec from 1851 to 1855, and again from 1861 to 1866, and St George's in Toronto, from 1856 to 1860. He held the position of secretary at the Church Society of the Diocese of Quebec, and lectured in the evenings at the Quebec cathedral. He was also an occasional writer, focusing on subjects related to sports and nature. His publications were found in the Dublin University Magazine, Blackwood's Magazine, and other British periodicals. He has also written articles for most Canadian magazines of his time, including the article entitled "The decrease, restoration, and preservation of salmon in Canada", published in the Canadian Journal in 1857. As an avid fisherman, Adamson wrote on the subject in his 1860 book Salmon-fishing in Canada, edited by Sir James Edward Alexander. Adamson has been described "the Izaak Walton of Canada". The British Literary Gazette described Adamson as someone who "is evidently, as all anglers should be, a true lover of nature, and some of his descriptions of Canadian scenery are given with considerable effect". Several universities awarded Adamson honorary Doctor of Civil Law degrees, including McGill University and the University of Bishop's College. He was also noted as a powerful preacher; one publication called him "one of the most eloquent in North America".

== Publications ==
- Adamson, William Agar (1860). Alexander, James Edward (ed.). Salmon-Fishing in Canada. London: Longman, Green, Longman, and Roberts. doi:10.5962/bhl.title.56138 – via BHL.
