= Anthony Adamson =

Canadian architect, author, teacher, and municipal politician (1906 – 2002)

Anthony Patrick Cawthra Adamson OC
- Born: October 7, 1906; Toronto, Ontario, Canada
- Died: May 3, 2002 (aged 95); Toronto, Ontario, Canada
- Other name: Tony Adamson
- Occupation: Architect

Anthony Patrick Cawthra Adamson (October 7, 1906 – May 3, 2002) was a Canadian architect, author, teacher, and municipal politician. He was a descendant of Joseph Cawthra through his mother.

Born in Toronto, Ontario to Colonel Agar Adamson and Mabel Cawthra, he grew up in Port Credit, Ontario on the family estate, before reading Architecture at the University of Cambridge and at the University of London.

Adamson was an architect, architectural planner, and an Associate Professor of Town Planning at the University of Toronto from 1950 to 1967. From 1953 to 1954, he was the Reeve of Toronto Township (now called Mississauga). He was the consultant and designer of Upper Canada Village, which opened in 1961. From 1969 to 1974, he was Chairman of the Ontario Arts Council. He wrote the introduction to Richard Bebout's 1972 book, "The Open Gate: Toronto Union Station," which was instrumental in helping to save the station from the wrecking ball.

Early in his career he edited Catherine Bauer Wurster's Homes or Hovels: Some Authoritative Views on Canadian Housing (Toronto: Canadian Institute of International Affairs and Canadian Assoc. for Adult Education, 1943), and published A Guide to Medieval Style Buildings in Toronto (Toronto: School of Architecture, University of Toronto, 1948). Adamson also wrote several books with Marion MacRae, including The Ancestral Roof: Domestic Architecture of Upper Canada (Toronto : Clarke, Irwin & Company, 1963), The Gaiety of Gables (Toronto : McClelland & Stewart, 1974), Hallowed Walls: Church Architecture of Upper Canada (Toronto : Vancouver : Clarke, Irwin & Company, 1975), Cornerstones of Order: Courthouses and Town Halls of Ontario, 1784-1914 (Toronto : Clarke, Irwin, 1983). His last book was a family history Wasps in the Attic: Biographies prepared from the material found in the attic of Grove Farm House, Port Credit Ontario. Being the story of the direct Canadian ancestors of Augusta and Anthony Adamson (Toronto: privately published, 1987).

Adamson was a Fellow of the Royal Architectural Institute of Canada, and in 1974, he was appointed an Officer of the Order of Canada.

In 1931, he married Charlotte Augusta Bonnycastle (1906-1997). They had three sons: Adrian (1933-2007), Inigo (1935-1977), and Jeremy (born 1943).
