= John Cawthra =

Upper Canada politician

John Cawthra (1789–1851) was a merchant, distiller and political figure in Upper Canada. He represented Simcoe from 1828 to 1830 in the Legislative Assembly of Upper Canada as a Reformer.

He was born in England somewhere near Guiseley, the son of Joseph Cawthra and Mary Turnpenny, and came to Toronto with his father while still young. He served in the militia during the War of 1812 and in this war he helped to save the life of Lieutenant Archibald McLean. After the battle he was offered reward money for the capture of Detroit; however, he did not take it. Cawthra settled in Newmarket about 1822. Cawthra died in Newmarket.

A heritage marker in Newmarket marks the site of his trading post, later replaced by Cawthra House, his residence, a general store and the town's first bank.

His son was Henry Cawthra (1830–1904), a barrister, and his daughter Mary (d. 1882) was the mother of William Mulock. Another son, Joseph, built a house called Guiseley House at Elm Avenue and Mount Pleasant named after his father's birthplace and has since been demolished.
