= Joseph Cawthra =

Joseph Cawthra (14 October 1759 – 15 February 1842) was a Canadian merchant and politician. Cawthra arrived in York, Upper Canada, (now Toronto) from Yeadon, Yorkshire, England, in 1802. He was granted a 400 acres (162 ha) tract of land in Mississauga, Ontario (which at the time was undeveloped rural property) by the Crown, provided he built a home on it within four years. The land remained in the hands of the Cawthra Family up until the 1970s, and much of it is now retained by the City of Mississauga as parkland.

Cawthra married Mary Turnpenny in 1801 and they had at least 9 children, 6 sons and three daughters, including:

- William Cawthra (1801–1880) - Toronto City Alderman 1836, merchant and philanthropist
- John Cawthra (1789–1851) - Newmarket merchant and member for Simcoe County in the Legislative Assembly of Upper Canada (1828–1830)
- twins Henry (1787-1854) and Joseph (1787-1790)
- Jonathan Cawthra (1791-1868) - Private in Captain Cameron's Company of the 3rd Regiment of York Militia during the War of 1812

== Business and Wealth ==
Cawthra founded and ran several businesses in Yorkshire and New York before opening Toronto's first apothecary shop, which would establish the base for his family's great wealth. Joseph's wealth grew enormously as a result of his involvement in profiteering during the War of 1812. Eventually Cawthra money was invested in other enterprises throughout the city, especially real estate. When he died, he left the bulk of his great estate and business interests to one of his sons, William Cawthra.

== Politics and philanthropy ==
Cawthra served one term as the Alderman for St. Lawrence Ward on the inaugural 1834 Toronto City Council before being defeated by conservative candidates. His seat was re-taken for the reformers in 1836 by his son William. Joseph's spell of municipal office, his sole venture into electoral politics, reflected not only his prominence in reform circles but also his active engagement in civic affairs.

Although Cawthra was a leading merchant, his attitude towards the Bank of Upper Canada was for a long time consistent with his politics. In evidence given to the House of Assembly's select committee on the state of the provincial currency in 1830, he decried its privileged position as the only chartered bank in the colony and advocated a more competitive financial market. Later that year, however, he acquired his first shares in the bank, possibly in order to stand as an "anti-establishment" candidate for its directorate, along with Jesse Ketchum, Thomas David Morrison, and Robert Baldwin. He was elected to the directorate in 1835, and re-elected in 1836 and 1837.

Cawthra was an anomalous and enigmatic figure in early Toronto society: a wealthy Anglican merchant who was involved in the Mackenzieite reform politics of Toronto who left no surviving evidence of his reasons. Family tradition records his antipathy for the Family Compact and ascribes his adherence to the Church of England to the personal advice of John Wesley, the father of Methodism, not to leave it. It seems plausible that Cawthra was simply a man of independent views, with sufficient financial independence to indulge them.

== Legacy ==
Cawthra Road (Peel Regional Road 17) and Cawthra Park Secondary School in Mississauga are named for him.

Cawthra Avenue in The Junction is not named for Cawthra but rather for the Cawthra Estate with linkage to Sir William Mulock whom had a son named Cawthra Mulock or his mother Mary Cawthra, daughter of John Cawthra.

== See also ==
- Cawthra House
