= York West (electoral district) =

Electoral district in Toronto, Ontario, Canada

Ontario electoral district
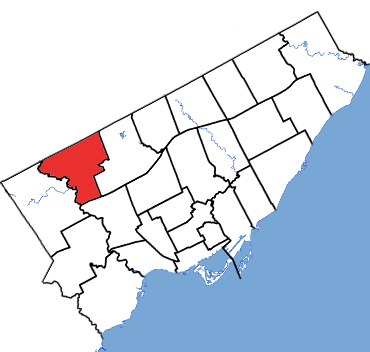
- York West's final boundary, in relation to the other Toronto electoral districts (c. 2010)

Defunct federal electoral district
- Legislature: House of Commons
- District created: 1867
- District abolished: 2015
- Last contested: 2011

Defunct provincial electoral district
- Legislature: Legislative Assembly of Ontario
- District created: 1867
- District abolished: 2018
- Last contested: 2014

Demographics
- Census subdivision: Toronto

York West (known as West York in the 1800s) was an electoral district in the City of Toronto, Ontario, Canada. A historical electoral district first defined in 1798 as the West Riding for the Country of York by legislation, it was most recently represented in the House of Commons of Canada until 2015 and Legislative Assembly of Ontario until 2018. It covered the area around the Jane and Finch neighbourhood in the northwest corner of Toronto in its final form, and had covered geography as far away as Hamilton during its long, non-continuous existence.

This article focuses on the historical presence and significance of the electoral district named York West. For the political representation of the neighbourhood in northwest Toronto covered by York West's final form, please see the articles for its successor electoral districts linked in the headnote above.

== Overview ==
York West was one of the original eight-two electoral districts in Ontario prescribed by the British North America Act, 1867 upon Canadian Confederation. It was represented both federally and provincially for all but about ten years in Canada's first 150 years. But its history traced further back. In May 1808, election was held for an electoral district named West York to elect a member to the 5th Parliament of Upper Canada. Since then, York West was represented in:

- Legislative Assembly of Upper Canada - from 1809 to 1812, in the 5th Parliament of Upper Canada
- Legislative Assembly of the Province of Canada - from 1848 to 1867 (in the 3rd to 8th parliament of the united province)
- House of Commons - from 1867 to 1904 (in the 1st to 9th Canadian parliaments) and again from 1917 to 2015 (in the 13th to 41st Canadian parliaments)
- Legislative Assembly of Ontario - from 1867 to 1987 (in the 1st to 33rd Ontario parliaments) and again from 1999 to 2018 (in the 37th to 41st Ontario parliaments
- Toronto City Council - from 2000 to 2018 over five council terms, as wards 7 and 8.

The electoral district’s existence was formally extinguished in 2014, not through the normal redistribution process, but by legislation introduced after the proclamation of Redistribution Order, 2013. The new name, Humber River--Black Creek, took effect upon the 2015 federal election and consequently in the 2018 provincial and municipal elections.

== Members ==
=== Before 1867 Canadian Confederation ===
- Compact Tory/Moderate Tory/Conservative
- Liberal/Clear Grits
- Reform

⁂ served as a cabinet minister

Member of Legislative Assembly
Parl	Years	Member	Member	General geography
Legislative Assembly of Upper Canada
1st	Not represented: Within Durham-York-1st Lincoln			
2nd	Not represented: Within Durham-York-1st Lincoln			
3rd	1801–04	Robert Nelles	Richard Beasley	Shared duo-member district: West York, 1st Lincoln & Haldimand
4th	1805–07	Robert Nelles	Solomon Hill	Shared duo-member district: West York, 1st Lincoln & Haldimand
4th	1808–08	Robert Nelles	Joseph Willcocks	Shared duo-member district: West York, 1st Lincoln & Haldimand
5th	1808–09	Richard Beasley (unseated)		Modern day Hamilton area
5th	1810–12	John Willson		Modern day Hamilton area
6th	1812–15	John Willson	Abraham Markle (vacated)	Shared duo-member district: West York, Saltfleet, Ancaster
6th	1815–16	John Willson	James Durand	Shared duo-member district: West York, Saltfleet, Ancaster
7th	Electoral district renamed to align with new counties created			
8th	Not represented: within electoral district of York and Simcoe			
9th	Not represented: within electoral district of York and Simcoe			
10th	Not represented: within electoral district of York and Simcoe			
11th	Not represented: within electoral district of York and Simcoe			
York County divided into four ridings, western portion assigned to 2nd Riding of the County of York
12th	1835–36	William Lyon Mackenzie		Peel Region (Note: as it is defined in modern days - the riding and the electoral district, as defined in 1845, consisted of the Townships of Caledon, Chinguacousy (now split between Caledon and Brampton), Toronto (now Mississauga), Gore of Toronto (now Brampton) and Albion (now Caledon) (Note: Canada))
13th	1837–40	Edward William Thomson		Peel Region
Upon unification of Upper and Lower Canadas 2nd Riding of York, Legislative Assembly of the Province of Canada
1st	1841–44	George Duggan		Peel Region (Note: as it is defined in modern days - the riding and the electoral district, as defined in 1845, consisted of the Townships of Caledon, Chinguacousy (now split between Caledon and Brampton), Toronto (now Mississauga), Gore of Toronto (now Brampton) and Albion (now Caledon) (Note: Canada))
2nd	1844–47	George Duggan		Peel Region
2nd Riding of York renamed York West
3rd	1848–51	Joseph Curran Morrison (Note: Morrison was a Reform Party member during his time as York West MPP, but later move to the Conservative and served in Conservative ministries) ⁂		Peel Region (Note: as it is defined in modern days - the riding and the electoral district, as defined in 1845, consisted of the Townships of Caledon, Chinguacousy (now split between Caledon and Brampton), Toronto (now Mississauga), Gore of Toronto (now Brampton) and Albion (now Caledon) (Note: Canada))
4th	1852–53	George Wright		Peel Region
5th	Not represented: renamed Peel			
York West — recreated from York South
6th	1858–61	William Pearce Howland ⁂		Toronto (w. of Yonge) (Note: The city limit of Toronto was fast evolving at the time as the city undertook dozens of annexation from the Township of York between 1883 and 1914. See Amalgamation of Toronto), and Vaughan, see below
7th	1862–63	William Pearce Howland ⁂		Toronto (w. of Yonge), and Vaughan, see below
8th	1863–66	William Pearce Howland ⁂		Toronto (w. of Yonge), and Vaughan, see below

=== After Canadian Confederation ===
- Conservative / Progressive
- Conservative / Liberal-Conservative
- Liberal Unionist
- Coorperative Commonwealth Federation
- ⁂ served as a cabinet minister
- † Died in office

Member of Parliament for York West (federal electoral district)				Member of Provincial Parliament for York West (provincial electoral district)			
Parl	Years	Member	General geography	General geography	Leg.	Years	Member
1st	1867–68	William Pearce Howland ⁂	York Township west of Yonge Street except for the City of Toronto as defined at the time, Etobicoke, Vaughan, with Richmond Hill added after 1874.		1st	1867–71	Thomas Grahame
1st	1868–72	Amos Wright	York Township west of Yonge Street except for the City of Toronto as defined at the time, Etobicoke, Vaughan, with Richmond Hill added after 1874.		2nd	1871–75	Peter Patterson
2nd	1872–74	David Blain	York Township west of Yonge Street except for the City of Toronto as defined at the time, Etobicoke, Vaughan, with Richmond Hill added after 1874.		3rd	1875–79	Peter Patterson
3rd	1874–78	David Blain	York Township west of Yonge Street except for the City of Toronto as defined at the time, Etobicoke, Vaughan, with Richmond Hill added after 1874.		4th	1879–83	Peter Patterson
4th	1878–82	Nathaniel Clarke Wallace	York Township west of Yonge Street except for the City of Toronto as defined at the time, Etobicoke, Vaughan, with Richmond Hill added after 1874.		4th	1879–83	Peter Patterson
5th	1882–87	Nathaniel Clarke Wallace	York Township west of Yonge Street except for the City of Toronto as defined at the time, Etobicoke, Vaughan, with Richmond Hill added after 1874.		5th	1883–86	John Gray
6th	1887–91	Nathaniel Clarke Wallace	York Township west of Yonge Street except for the City of Toronto as defined at the time, Etobicoke, Vaughan, with Richmond Hill added after 1874.		6th	1886–90	John Taylor Gilmour
7th	1891–96	Nathaniel Clarke Wallace	York Township west of Yonge Street except for the City of Toronto as defined at the time, Etobicoke, Vaughan, with Richmond Hill added after 1874.		7th	1890–94	John Taylor Gilmour
8th	1896–97	Nathaniel Clarke Wallace	York Township west of Yonge Street except for the City of Toronto as defined at the time, Etobicoke, Vaughan, with Richmond Hill added after 1874.		8th	1894–98	Joseph St. John
8th	1897–1900	Nathaniel Clarke Wallace	York Township west of Yonge Street except for the City of Toronto as defined at the time, Etobicoke, Vaughan, with Richmond Hill added after 1874.		9th	1898–1902	William James Hill
9th	1900–02	Nathaniel Clarke Wallace	York Township west of Yonge Street except for the City of Toronto as defined at the time, Etobicoke, Vaughan, with Richmond Hill added after 1874.		9th	1898–1902	William James Hill
9th	1902–04	Archibald Campbell	York Township west of Yonge Street except for the City of Toronto as defined at the time, Etobicoke, Vaughan, with Richmond Hill added after 1874.		10th	1902–05	Joseph St. John†
10th	Not represented: distributed to Toronto North, Toronto West, York Centre and York South			York (w. of Yonge), Etobicoke and Vaughan Townships	11th	1905–07	Joseph St. John†
11th	Not represented: distributed to Toronto North, Toronto West, York Centre and York South			York (w. of Yonge), Etobicoke and Vaughan Townships	11th	1907–08	Forbes Godfrey† ⁂
12th	Not represented: distributed to Toronto North, Toronto West, York Centre and York South			York (w. of Yonge), Etobicoke and Vaughan Townships	12th	1908–11	Forbes Godfrey† ⁂
York West re-created from York Centre, York South				York (w. of Yonge), Etobicoke and Vaughan Townships	13th	1911–14	Forbes Godfrey† ⁂
13th	1917–21	Thomas G. Wallace†	Etobicoke (Note: Former Township/City of Etobicoke immediately prior to 1998 amalgamation), Weston, (Note: Former Town of Weston before being annexed into the Borough of York in 1967) Vaughan	York (w. of Yonge), Etobicoke and Vaughan Townships	14th	1914–19	Forbes Godfrey† ⁂
14th	1921–25	Henry Lumley Drayton ⁂	Etobicoke, Weston, Vaughan	York (w. of Yonge), Etobicoke and Vaughan Townships	15th	1919–23	Forbes Godfrey† ⁂
15th	1925–26	Henry Lumley Drayton ⁂	York (w. of Yonge) and Etobicoke	York (w. of Yonge), Etobicoke and Vaughan Townships	16th	1923–26	Forbes Godfrey† ⁂
16th	1926–28	Henry Lumley Drayton ⁂	York (w. of Yonge) and Etobicoke	Etobicoke (plus a sliver)	17th	1926–29	Forbes Godfrey† ⁂
16th	1928–30	Earl Lawson ⁂	York (w. of Yonge) and Etobicoke	Etobicoke (plus a sliver)	18th	1929–32	Forbes Godfrey† ⁂
17th	1930–35	Earl Lawson ⁂	York (w. of Yonge) and Etobicoke	Etobicoke (plus a sliver)	18th	1932–34	Henry Isaac Price
18th	1935–40	John E.L. Streight	Etobicoke (plus a sliver)	Etobicoke (plus a sliver)	19th	1934–37	William Gardhouse
19th	1940–45	Agar Rodney Adamson†	Etobicoke (plus a sliver)	Etobicoke (plus a sliver)	20th	1937–43	William Gardhouse
19th	1940–45	Agar Rodney Adamson†	Etobicoke (plus a sliver)	Etobicoke (plus a sliver)	21st	1943–45	Charles Millard
20th	1945–49	Agar Rodney Adamson†	Etobicoke (plus a sliver)	Etobicoke (plus a sliver)	22nd	1945–48	John Pearman Allan
21st	1949–53	Agar Rodney Adamson†	Etobicoke (plus a sliver)	Etobicoke (plus a sliver)	23rd	1948–51	Charles Millard
22nd	1953–54	Agar Rodney Adamson†	Etobicoke (minus a sliver)	Etobicoke (plus a sliver)	24th	1951–55	Elmer Brandon†
22nd	1954–57	John Borden Hamilton	Etobicoke (minus a sliver)	Etobicoke (minus a sliver)	25th	1955–56	Elmer Brandon†
23rd	1957–58	John Borden Hamilton	Etobicoke (minus a sliver)	Etobicoke (minus a sliver)	25th	1956–59	Leslie Rowntree ⁂
24th	1958–62	John Borden Hamilton	Etobicoke (minus a sliver)	Etobicoke (minus a sliver)	26th	1959–63	Leslie Rowntree ⁂
25th	1962–63	Red Kelly	Etobicoke (minus a sliver)	Etobicoke (minus a sliver)	26th	1959–63	Leslie Rowntree ⁂
26th	1963–65	Red Kelly	Etobicoke (minus a sliver)	Etobicoke (centre portion)	27th	1963–67	Leslie Rowntree ⁂
27th	1965–68	Robert Winters ⁂	Etobicoke (minus a sliver)	Etobicoke (centre portion)	28th	1967–71	Leslie Rowntree ⁂
28th	1968–72	Philip Givens	Etobicoke & North York (both partial) (Note: Most of Rexdale, plus small portion of Jane & Finch area, as defined by Representation Order, 1966)	Etobicoke (centre portion)	29th	1971–75	John Palmer MacBeth ⁂
29th	1972–74	James Fleming ⁂	Etobicoke & North York (both partial)	Etobicoke (centre portion)	29th	1971–75	John Palmer MacBeth ⁂
30th	1974–79	James Fleming ⁂	Etobicoke & North York (both partial)	Etobicoke (west centre portion)	30th	1975–77	Nick Leluk ⁂
31st	1979–80	James Fleming ⁂	North York (Jane & Finch) (Note: Humber River to HWY 400/Keele, as defined by Representation Order, 1976)	Etobicoke (west centre portion)	31st	1977–81	Nick Leluk ⁂
32nd	1980–84	James Fleming ⁂	North York (Jane & Finch)	Etobicoke (west centre portion)	32nd	1981–85	Nick Leluk ⁂
33rd	1984–88	Sergio Marchi ⁂	North York (Jane & Finch)	Etobicoke (west centre portion)	33rd	1985–87	Nick Leluk ⁂
34th	1988–93	Sergio Marchi ⁂	North York (Jane & Finch) (Note: Humber River to Black Creek/Jane, as defined by Representation Order, 1987)		34th	Not represented: distributed to Etobicoke West and Etobicoke—Humber	
35th	1993–97	Sergio Marchi ⁂	North York (Jane & Finch)		35th	Not represented: distributed to Etobicoke West and Etobicoke—Humber	
36th	1997–99	Sergio Marchi ⁂	North York (Jane & Finch) (Note: Humber River to Dufferin/Jane, as defined by Representation Order, 1996)		36th	Not represented: distributed to Etobicoke West and Etobicoke—Humber	
36th	1999–2000	Judy Sgro ⁂	North York (Jane & Finch)	York West re-created from Yorkview and Downsview			
36th	1999–2000	Judy Sgro ⁂	North York (Jane & Finch) (Note: Humber River to Dufferin/Jane, as defined by Representation Order, 1996)		37th	1999–2003	Mario Sergio ⁂
37th	2000–04	Judy Sgro ⁂	North York (Jane & Finch)		37th	1999–2003	Mario Sergio ⁂
38th	2004–06	Judy Sgro ⁂	North York (Jane & Finch) (Note: Humber River to Keele/Jane , as defined by Representation Order, 2003)		38th	2003–07	Mario Sergio ⁂
39th	2006–08	Judy Sgro ⁂	North York (Jane & Finch)		39th	2007–11	Mario Sergio ⁂
40th	2008–11	Judy Sgro ⁂	North York (Jane & Finch)		40th	2011–14	Mario Sergio ⁂
41st	2011–15	Judy Sgro ⁂	North York (Jane & Finch)		41st	2014–18	Mario Sergio ⁂
Named changed to Humber River—Black Creek				Named changed to Humber River—Black Creek			

== Elections Results ==
Election results are group together by the various phases of the electoral district's core formation.

=== York Township, Etobicoke, Vaughan ===
York West electoral district was defined in 1853 to "consist of the Townships of Etobicoke, Vaughan, and that portion of the Township of York lying West of Yonge Street" and was retained by the British North America Act, 1867. This remained the core formation of West York from 1867 until 1904 federally and 1926 provincially, with many small scale boundary changes occurred mostly outside of regular redistribution cycle (further details in the section above):

- addition of the part of Village of Richmond Hill east of Yonge as of 1878 dominion/1875 Ontario election, and the removal of the entire village provincially in 1885
- removal of territory as results of more than a dozen annexations undertook by Toronto between 1883 and 1914, except for West Toronto/Toronto Junction, which became Ward 7 of the city and remain in West York both federally and provincially (see Amalgamation of Toronto for a full list)

==== 1867–1902 dominion elections ====
1867 Canadian federal election: York West
Party	Candidate	Votes	%
Liberal–Conservative	William Pearce Howland	810	73.17
Unknown	H. S. Hubertus	297	26.83
Unknown	David Blain	0	0.00
Total valid votes		1,107	49.35
Eligible voters		2,243	
Source: 1867 Return of the Elections to House of Commons

Canadian federal by-election, August 14, 1868 Resignation of Sir William Pearce Howland (appointed Lieutenant Governor of Ontario)
Party	Candidate	Votes	%	±%
Liberal	Amos Wright	654	72.4	
Unknown	John Bell	249	27.6	
Total valid votes		903	100.0	

1872 Canadian federal election: York West/York-Ouest
Party	Candidate	Votes	%	±%
Liberal	David Blain	973	56.1	-16.3
Unknown	W. Tyrrell	760	43.9	
Total valid votes		1,733	100.0	
Source: Canadian Elections Database

1874 Canadian federal election: York West
Party	Candidate	Votes	%	±%
Liberal	David Blain	983	68.3	+12.2
Conservative	N. Wallace	456	31.7	
Total valid votes		1,439	100.0	
Source: lop.parl.ca

1878 Canadian federal election: York West
Party	Candidate	Votes	%	±%
Conservative	Nathaniel Clarke Wallace	1,326	54.1	+22.4
Liberal	David Blain	1,124	45.9	-22.4
Total valid votes		2,450	100.0	

1882 Canadian federal election: York West
Party	Candidate	Votes	%	±%
Conservative	Nathaniel Clarke Wallace	1,561	54.1	0.0
Independent	Thos. Hodgins	1,324	45.9	
Total valid votes		2,885	100.0	

1887 Canadian federal election: York West
Party	Candidate	Votes	%	±%
Conservative	Nathaniel Clarke Wallace	2,638	55.6	+1.5
Liberal	Adam Maconchy Lynd	2,110	44.4	
Total valid votes		4,748	100.0	

1891 Canadian federal election: York West
Party	Candidate	Votes	%	±%
Conservative	Nathaniel Clarke Wallace	3,434	56.6	+1.1
Liberal	W.H.P. Clement	2,628	43.4	-1.1
Total valid votes		6,062	100.0	

Canadian federal by-election, December 21, 1892 Acceptance of an office of profit or emolument under the crown (appointment as Controller of Customs of Toronto)
Party	Candidate	Votes	%	±%
Conservative	Nathaniel Clarke Wallace	Acclaimed		

1896 Canadian federal election: York West
Party	Candidate	Votes	%	±%
Conservative	Nathaniel Clarke Wallace	5,018	74.8	+18.2
Patrons of Industry	John Brown	950	14.2	
Conservative	James Platt	745	11.1	
Total valid votes		6,713	100.0	
Note: popular vote compared to vote in 1891 general election.

1900 Canadian federal election: York West
Party	Candidate	Votes	%	±%
Conservative	Nathaniel Clarke Wallace	5,126	54.3	-31.5
Liberal	Archibald Campbell	4,306	45.7	
Total valid votes		9,432	100.0	

Canadian federal by-election, January 15, 1902 On the death of MP Wallace on October 8, 1901
Party	Candidate	Votes	%	±%
Liberal	Archibald Campbell	4,348	50.6	+5.0
Conservative	T.F. Wallace	4,237	49.4	-5.0
Total valid votes		8,585	100.0	

==== 1867–1923 Ontario provincial elections ====
1867 Ontario general election: York West
Party	Candidate	Votes	%	±%
Conservative	Thomas Grahame	587	46.44	
Liberal	Dr. Bull	514	40.66	
Independent	W. Tyrrell	163	12.90	
Total valid votes/Eligible Voters		1,264		2,229
Turnout		1,264	56.71	
Plurality		73	5.78	
Conservative gain		Swing		(Note: Liberal held seat in the 8th and final legislative assembly of the Province of Canada)
Source (vote tallies): "York West, 1867". Data Explorer. Elections Ontario.

1871 Ontario general election: York West
Party	Candidate	Votes	%	±%
Liberal	Peter Patterson	865	56.32	+15.65
Conservative	Thomas Grahame	671	43.68	−2.76
Turnout		1,536	62.54	+5.83
Eligible voters		2,456		
Plurality		194	12.63	
Liberal gain from Conservative		Swing		+9.20
Source: Elections Ontario

1875 Ontario general election: York West
Party	Candidate	Votes	%	±%
Liberal	Peter Patterson	Acclaimed		
Source: Elections Ontario

1879 Ontario general election: York West
Party	Candidate	Votes	%	±%
Liberal	Peter Patterson	1,268	51.21	-5.11
Conservative	W. Tyrrell	1,208	48.79	+5.11
Total valid votes		2,476	63.16	+0.62
Eligible voters		3,920		
Plurality		60	2.42	
Liberal hold		Swing		-5.11
Source: Elections Ontario
Note re ±%: As compred to the 1871 general election, as Patterson was elected by acclaimation in 1875.

1883 Ontario general election
Party	Candidate	Votes	%	±%
Conservative	John Gray	1,553	50.50	1.72
Liberal	Peter Patterson	1,522	49.50	-1.72
Total valid votes/Eligible Voters		3,075		4,660
Turnout		3,091	66.33	3.17
Plurality		31	1.01	
Conservative gain from Liberal		Swing		1.72
Source (vote tallies): "York West, 1883". Data Explorer. Elections Ontario.

1886 Ontario general election
Party	Candidate	Votes	%	±%
Liberal	John Taylor Gilmour	1,539	53.12	3.63
Conservative	Roland Orr	1,358	46.88	-3.63
Total valid votes/Eligible Voters		2,897		4,681
Turnout		2,926	62.51	-3.82
Plurality		181	6.25	
Liberal gain from Progressive Conservative		Swing		3.63
Source (vote tallies): "York West, 1886". Data Explorer. Elections Ontario.

1890 Ontario general election
Party	Candidate	Votes	%	±%
Liberal	John Taylor Gilmour	1,789	50.87	-2.26
Conservative (Equal Right)	D.W. Clendennan	1,728	49.13	2.26
Total valid votes/Eligible Voters		3,517		3,739
Turnout		3,542	94.73	32.22
Plurality		61	1.73	
Liberal hold		Swing		-2.26
Source (vote tallies): "York West, 1890". Data Explorer. Elections Ontario.

1894 Ontario general election
Party	Candidate	Votes	%	±%
Conservative	Joseph St. John	2,151	50.62	3.75
Liberal	William James Hill	2,098	49.38	-1.49
Total valid votes/Eligible Voters		4,249		5,896
Turnout		4,269	72.41	-22.33
Plurality		53	1.25	
Conservative gain from Liberal		Swing		1.49
Source (vote tallies): "York West, 1894". Data Explorer. Elections Ontario.

1898 Ontario general election
Party	Candidate	Votes	%	±%
Liberal	William James Hill	2,465	50.36	0.98
Conservative	Joseph St. John	2,430	49.64	-0.98
Total valid votes/Eligible Voters		4,895		5,923
Turnout		4,923	83.12	10.71
Plurality		35	0.72	
Liberal gain from Conservative		Swing		0.99
Source (vote tallies): "York West, 1898". Data Explorer. Elections Ontario.

1902 Ontario general election
Party	Candidate	Votes	%	±%
Conservative	Joseph St. John	2,802	54.04	4.40
Liberal	William James Hill	2,383	45.96	-4.40
Total valid votes/Eligible Voters		5,185		6,777
Turnout		5,188	76.55	-6.56
Plurality		419	8.08	
Conservative gain from Liberal		Swing		4.40
Source (vote tallies): "York West, 1902". Data Explorer. Elections Ontario.

1905 Ontario general election
Party	Candidate	Votes	%	±%
Conservative	Joseph St. John	3,276	64.07	18.11
Liberal	George Verrall	1,837	35.93	-18.11
Total valid votes/Eligible Voters		5,113		8,395
Turnout		5,128	61.08	-15.47
Plurality		1,439	28.14	"
Conservative hold		Swing		10.03
Source (vote tallies): "York West, 1905". Data Explorer. Elections Ontario. (EO data have the party affiliations for the two candidates erroneously flipped.) (Note: St. John was announced by Premier Whitney as his choice for Speaker same day as announcement of new cabinet. Toronto Star announced Liberals meetings in support of Verrall during campaign.)

Ontario provincial by-election, 1907-06-01 On the death of Hon. Joseph St John, Speaker
Party	Candidate	Votes	%	±%
Conservative	Forbes Godfrey	2,702	85.81	49.88
	E Williams	313	9.94	
Independent	Frederick Peel	134	4.26	
Total valid votes		3,149		
Plurality		2,389	75.87	
Conservative hold		Swing		23.87
Source (vote tallies): Chief Electoral Officer of Ontario (compiled) (1968). Centennial Edition of a History of the Electoral Districts, Legislatures and Ministries of the Province of Ontario 1867-1968. Queen’s Printer. p. 502. OCLC 1052682.

1908 Ontario general election
Party	Candidate	Votes	%	±%
Conservative	Forbes Godfrey	3,241	61.80	-24.00
Liberal	George Verrall	1,788	34.10	-29.98
Independent	Frederick Peel	215	4.10	-0.16
Total valid votes/Eligible Voters		5,244		9,618
Turnout		5,272	54.81	-6.27
Plurality		1,453	27.71	
Conservative hold		Swing		-24.08
Source (vote tallies): "York West, 1908". Data Explorer. Elections Ontario. ±% for turnout compared against previous general election

1911 Ontario general election
Party	Candidate	Votes	%	±%
Conservative	Forbes Godfrey	2,847	65.16	3.36
Liberal	George Verrall	1,522	34.84	0.74
Total valid votes/Eligible Voters		4,369		11,106
Turnout		4,419	39.79	-15.02
Plurality		1,325	30.33	
Conservative hold		Swing		1.31
Source (vote tallies): "York West, 1911". Data Explorer. Elections Ontario.

1914 Ontario general election
Party	Candidate	Votes	%	±%
Conservative	Forbes Godfrey	acclamation		
Conservative hold		Swing		
Source (vote tallies): "1914". Data Explorer. Elections Ontario.

1919 Ontario general election
Party	Candidate	Votes	%	±%
Conservative	Forbes Godfrey	10,436	37.57	-62.43
Labour	James Simpson	8,323	29.96	
Independent	Frank Whetter	4,935	17.76	
Independent Conservative	Samuel Ryding	4,087	14.71	
Total valid votes/Eligible Voters		27,781		45,776
Turnout		30,450	66.52	26.73
Plurality		2,113	7.61	
Conservative hold		Swing		n/a
Source (vote tallies): "York West, 1919". Data Explorer. Elections Ontario.

1923 Ontario general election
Party	Candidate	Votes	%	±%
Conservative	Forbes Godfrey	13,338	70.63	33.06
Independent	Thomas McGuire	5,547	29.37	
Total valid votes/Eligible Voters		18,885		60,453
Turnout		19,148	31.67	-34.85
Plurality		7,791	0.41	
Conservative hold		Swing		n/a
Source (vote tallies): "York West, 1923". Data Explorer (Electoral district mislabeled for 1923 results). Elections Ontario.

=== Etobicoke plus Vaughan, Etobicoke plus York Township ===
==== 1917–1930 federal election ====
The York West federal electoral district went through five elections with two formations that was never adopted by the provincial electoral district.

- For 1917 and 1921 elections - Etobicoke, Vaughan, Weston, Toronto's Ward Seven, and a small piece of York Township in the southern part.
- For 1925, 1926 and 1930 elections - Etobicoke and York Township, Weston, Toronto's Ward Seven, but not Vaughan

1917 Canadian federal election: York West
Party	Candidate	Votes	%	±%
Government (Unionist)	Thomas George Wallace	11,930	80.7	-
Opposition (Laurier Liberals)	Frank Denton	2,856	19.3	-
Total valid votes		14,786	100.0	-
Note: Electoral district re-created from York Centre and York South

MP Wallace died on February 20, 1921, as his father did twenty years prior; no byelection was held to fill the vacancy prior to the December general election.

1921 Canadian federal election: York West
Party	Candidate	Votes	%	±%
Conservative	Henry Lumley Drayton	8,850	45.3	-35.4
Liberal	John Everett Lyle Streight	7,989	40.9	+21.6
Progressive	James Alexander Cameron	2,710	13.9	
Total valid votes		19,549	100.0	
Note re ±%: Conservative compared to Government, Liberal to Opposition in 1917 election, .

The definition of York West was revised in 1924 to be "consisting of that part of the county of York lying west of Yonge Street, south of the south boundary of the township of Vaughan and outside the city of Toronto."

1925 Canadian federal election: York West
Party	Candidate	Votes	%	±%
Conservative	Henry Lumley Drayton	23,637	75.8	+30.6
Liberal	Alexander MacGregor	7,536	24.2	-16.7
Total valid votes		31,173	100.0	

1926 Canadian federal election: York West
Party	Candidate	Votes	%	±%
Conservative	Henry Lumley Drayton	16,479	77.9	+2.1
Liberal	Alfred Taylour Hunter	4,681	22.1	-2.1
Total valid votes		21,160	100.0	

Canadian federal by-election, October 29, 1928 Resignation of Henry Lumley Drayton (appointed by the Ontario Government as chairman of the Liquor Control Board of Ontario)
Party	Candidate	Votes	%	±%
Conservative	Earl Lawson	Acc.		

1930 Canadian federal election: York West
Party	Candidate	Votes	%	±%
Conservative	Earl Lawson	20,843	64.7	-13.2
Liberal	William Arthur Edwards	11,368	35.3	+13.2
Total valid votes		32,211	100.0	
Note: popular vote compared to vote in 1926 election.
Source: lop.parl.ca

=== Etobicoke's Electoral district ===
==== 1935–1965 federal elections ====
1935 Canadian federal election: York West
Party	Candidate	Votes	%	±%
Liberal	John Everett Lyle Streight	8,198	31.9	-3.4
Conservative	Peter Laurie Brown	8,138	31.7	-33.0
Co-operative Commonwealth	Frederick Merriott Fish	5,049	19.6	
Reconstruction	Harry Herbert Hallatt	4,319	16.8	
Total valid votes		25,704	100.0	

1940 Canadian federal election: York West
Party	Candidate	Votes	%	±%
Conservative	Agar Rodney Adamson	12,788	44.6	+12.9
Liberal	Chris. J. Bennett	12,117	42.2	+10.3
Co-operative Commonwealth	David Lewis	3,787	13.2	-6.4
Total valid votes		28,692	100.0	

Note: "National Government" vote is compared to Conservative vote in 1935 election.

1945 Canadian federal election: York West
Party	Candidate	Votes	%	±%
Progressive Conservative	Agar Rodney Adamson	14,703	41.2	-3.4
Liberal	Chris. J. Bennett	12,947	36.2	-6.0
Co-operative Commonwealth	Murray S. Kernighan	7,183	20.1	+6.9
Labor–Progressive	Alexander Whyte Welch	886	2.5	-97.5
Total valid votes		35,719	100.0	

1949 Canadian federal election: York West
Party	Candidate	Votes	%	±%
Progressive Conservative	Agar Rodney Adamson	19,184	38.1	-3.1
Liberal	Kenneth Thompson	18,689	37.1	+0.9
Co-operative Commonwealth	Murray S. Kernighan	12,498	24.8	+4.7
Total valid votes		50,371	100.0	

1953 Canadian federal election: York West
Party	Candidate	Votes	%	±%
Progressive Conservative	Agar Rodney Adamson	12,228	41.5	+3.4
Liberal	Robert M. Campbell	10,262	34.8	-2.3
Co-operative Commonwealth	Charles Hibbert Millard	6,569	22.3	-2.5
Labor–Progressive	Harry Hunter	417	1.4	
Total valid votes		29,476	100.0	

Canadian federal by-election, September 8, 1954 On Mr. Agar Rodney Adamson on April 8, 1954)
Party	Candidate	Votes	%	±%
Progressive Conservative	John Borden Hamilton	12,228	45.3	+3.8
Liberal	Robert M. Campbell	9,768	36.2	+1.4
Co-operative Commonwealth	Bruce William Evans	4,711	17.5	-4.8
Labor–Progressive	Leslie Tom Morris	282	1.0	-0.4
Total valid votes		26,989	100.0	

1957 Canadian federal election: York West
Party	Candidate	Votes	%	±%
Progressive Conservative	John B. Hamilton	27,035	55.5	+10.2
Liberal	Jack Bell	13,665	28.1	-8.1
Co-operative Commonwealth	Rose Sark	6,600	13.6	-3.9
Social Credit	Frank V. Russell	1,368	2.8	
Total valid votes		48,668	100.0	

1958 Canadian federal election: York West
Party	Candidate	Votes	%	±%
Progressive Conservative	John B. Hamilton	34,208	60.1	+4.6
Liberal	Jack Bell	15,589	27.4	-0.7
Co-operative Commonwealth	Rose Sark	6,502	11.4	-2.1
Social Credit	David R. Milne	612	1.1	-1.7
Total valid votes		56,911	100.0	

1962 Canadian federal election: York West
Party	Candidate	Votes	%	±%
Liberal	Red Kelly	32,362	42.4	+15.0
Progressive Conservative	John B. Hamilton	28,467	37.3	-22.8
New Democratic	David Middleton	14,356	18.8	+7.4
Social Credit	David R. Milne	1,205	1.6	+0.5
Total valid votes		76,390	100.0	
Note: ±% for NDP as compared to CCF's 1958 results.

1963 Canadian federal election: York West
Party	Candidate	Votes	%	±%
Liberal	Red Kelly	41,480	51.4	+9.1
Progressive Conservative	Alan Eagleson	24,479	30.3	-6.9
New Democratic	David Middleton	14,003	17.4	-1.4
Social Credit	David R. Milne	697	0.9	-0.7
Total valid votes		80,659	100.0	

1965 Canadian federal election: York West
Party	Candidate	Votes	%	±%
Liberal	Robert H. Winters	43,807	47.7	-3.7
Progressive Conservative	George Hogan	27,071	29.5	-0.9
New Democratic	Martha Brewin	20,993	22.9	+5.5
Total valid votes		91,871	100.0	

==== 1926–1959 provincial elections ====
1926 Ontario general election
Party	Candidate	Votes	%	±%
Conservative	Forbes Godfrey	9,927	62.20	-8.43
Prohibition	Emerson Bull	3,114	19.51	
Liberal	J.R. Serson	2,919	18.29	
Total valid votes/Eligible Voters		15,960		25,481
Turnout		16,064	63.04	31.37
Plurality		6,813	42.69	
Conservative hold		Swing		n/a
Source (vote tallies): "1926". Data Explorer. Elections Ontario.

Ontario provincial by-election, 1932-05-28 on the death of Dr. Forbes Godfrey on January 6, 1932
Party	Candidate	Votes	%	±%
Conservative	Forbes Godfrey	8,296	65.29	3.09
Liberal	William Edwards	4,411	34.71	16.42
Total valid votes/Eligible Voters		12,707		28,633
Turnout		12,821	44.78	-18.27
Plurality		3,885	30.57	
Conservative hold		Swing		-6.67
Source (vote tallies): Chief Electoral Officer of Ontario (compiled) (1968). Centennial Edition of a History of the Electoral Districts, Legislatures and Ministries of the Province of Ontario 1867-1968. Queen’s Printer. p. 503. OCLC 1052682.

1934 Ontario general election
Party	Candidate	Votes	%	±%
Liberal	William Gardhouse	11,600	45.60	10.14
Conservative	John Price	9,481	37.27	-3.50
Co-operative Commonwealth	John Buckley	3,875	15.23	-8.02
Communist	Ernest Lawrie	483	1.90	
Total valid votes/Eligible Voters		25,439		40,752
Turnout		25,822	63.36	0.32
Plurality		2,119	8.33	
Liberal gain from Conservative		Swing		19.45
Source (vote tallies): "York West, 1934". Data Explorer. Elections Ontario.^ ±% for turnout compared against previous general election

1937 Ontario general election
Party	Candidate	Votes	%	±%
Liberal	William Gardhouse	11,607	44.55	-1.05
Conservative	Wesley Magwood	10,407	39.95	2.68
Co-operative Commonwealth	Archibald Woods	2,622	10.06	-5.17
Labour	George Watson	1,307	5.02	
Socialist-Labour	George Thomson	110	0.42	
Total valid votes/Eligible Voters		26,053		45,536
Turnout		26,364	57.9	-5.47
Plurality		1,200	4.61	
Liberal hold		Swing		-1.86
Source (vote tallies): "York West, 1937". Data Explorer. Elections Ontario.

1943 Ontario general election
Party	Candidate	Votes	%	±%
Co-operative Commonwealth	Charles Millard	10,720	42.05	31.98
Progressive Conservative	John Entwistle	9,412	36.92	-3.03
Liberal	William Gardhouse	5,364	21.04	-23.51
Total valid votes/Eligible Voters		25,496		47,859
Turnout		25,648	53.59	-4.31
Plurality		1,308	5.13	
Co-operative Commonwealth gain from Liberal		Swing		17.51
Source (vote tallies): "York West, 1943". Data Explorer. Elections Ontario.^ swing in favour calculated aginast PC candidte

1945 Ontario general election
Party	Candidate	Votes	%	±%
Progressive Conservative	John Pearman Allan	16,408	43.95	7.04
Co-operative Commonwealth	Charles Millard	11,986	32.11	-9.94
Liberal	Ashley Hornell	8,016	21.47	0.43
Labor–Progress.	Alfred Campbell	922	2.47	
Total valid votes/Eligible Voters		37,332		55,125
Turnout		37,797	68.57	14.98
Plurality		4,422	11.85	
Progressive Conservative gain from Co-operative Commonwealth		Swing		8.49
Source (vote tallies): "York West, 1945". Data Explorer. Elections Ontario.

1948 Ontario general election
Party	Candidate	Votes	%	±%
Co-operative Commonwealth	Charles Millard	18,627	43.41	11.30
Progressive Conservative	John Pearman Allan	16,244	37.85	-6.10
Liberal	Robert Joy	8,041	18.74	-2.73
Total valid votes/Eligible Voters		42,912		62,335
Turnout		43,276	69.42	0.86
Plurality		2,383	5.55	
Co-operative Commonwealth gain from Progressive Conservative		Swing		8.70
Source (vote tallies): "York West, 1948". Data Explorer. Elections Ontario.

1951 Ontario general election
Party	Candidate	Votes	%	±%
Progressive Conservative	Elmer Brandon	24,614	47.62	9.77
Co-operative Commonwealth	Charles Millard	17,041	32.97	-10.44
Liberal	Ward Allen	10,034	19.41	0.67
Total valid votes/Eligible Voters		51,689		79,920
Turnout		52,262	65.39	-4.03
Plurality		7,573	0.15	
Progressive Conservative gain from Co-operative Commonwealth		Swing		2.85
Source (vote tallies): "York West, 1951". Data Explorer. Elections Ontario.

1955 Ontario general election
Party	Candidate	Votes	%	±%
Progressive Conservative	Elmer Brandon	14,372	45.79	-1.83
Co-operative Commonwealth	Charles Millard	10,175	32.42	-0.55
Liberal	Arthur Nagels	6,837	21.78	2.37
Total valid votes/Eligible Voters		31,384		57,454
Turnout		31,624	55.04	-10.35
Plurality		4,197	13.37	
Progressive Conservative hold		Swing		6.61
Source (vote tallies): "York West, 1955". Data Explorer. Elections Ontario.

Ontario provincial by-election, 1956 on the death of Mr. William Elmer Brandon
Party	Candidate	Votes	%	±%
Progressive Conservative	Leslie Rowntree	11,089	51.18	5.39
Co-operative Commonwealth	Lynn R Williams	6,115	28.23	-4.20
Liberal	Arthur Nagels	4,461	20.59	-1.19
Total valid votes/Eligible Voters		21,665		unknown
Plurality		4,974	22.96	
Progressive Conservative hold		Swing		4.79
Source (vote tallies): Chief Electoral Officer of Ontario (compiled) (1968). Centennial Edition of a History of the Electoral Districts, Legislatures and Ministries of the Province of Ontario 1867-1968. Queen’s Printer. p. 504. OCLC 1052682.

1959 Ontario general election
Party	Candidate	Votes	%	±%
Progressive Conservative	Leslie Rowntree	18,355	44.77	-6.42
Liberal	Edward Lewinsky	12,164	29.67	9.08
Co-operative Commonwealth	Marjorie Clarke	10,484	25.57	-2.66
Total valid votes/Eligible Voters		41,003		80,247
Turnout		41,433	51.63	-3.41
Plurality		6,191	15.1	
Progressive Conservative hold		Swing		-7.74
Source (vote tallies): "York West, 1959". Data Explorer. Elections Ontario.

=== Urban Transition ===
==== Rexdale: 1968–79 federal elections ====
1968 Canadian federal election: York West
Party	Candidate	Votes	%	±%
Liberal	Philip Givens	20,416	44.8	-2.9
New Democratic	Val Scott	16,204	35.6	+12.7
Progressive Conservative	Wes Boddington	8,344	18.3	-11.2
Independent	Norman Gunn	442	1.0	
Communist	William Kashtan	155	0.3	
Total valid votes		45,561	100.0	

1972 Canadian federal election: York West
Party	Candidate	Votes	%	±%
Liberal	James Fleming	22,270	39.5	-5.3
New Democratic	Val Scott	18,639	33.1	-2.5
Progressive Conservative	Clem Nusca	14,997	26.6	+8.3
Social Credit	David Horwood	237	0.4	
Independent	John Bizzell	167	0.3	
Independent	Sean Daly	84	0.1	
Total valid votes		56,394	100.0	

1974 Canadian federal election: York West
Party	Candidate	Votes	%	±%
Liberal	James Fleming	28,075	52.9	+13.4
Progressive Conservative	John Hanna	13,734	25.9	-0.7
New Democratic	Freda Hawkins	10,139	19.1	-13.9
Independent	Jim Laxer^{1}	674	1.3	
Independent	Thomas Frazer	215	0.4	
Communist	George Harris	134	0.3	
Marxist–Leninist	Christine A. Nugent	71	0.1	
Total valid votes		53,042	100.0	
Source: lop.parl.ca^{1} Movement for an Independent Socialist Canada

1979 Canadian federal election: York West
Party	Candidate	Votes	%	±%
Liberal	James Fleming	18,410	47.0	-5.9
Progressive Conservative	Robert Michener	10,572	27.0	+1.1
New Democratic	Elio Costa	9,712	24.8	+5.7
Libertarian	Dan A. Kornitzer	246	0.6	
Communist	Gordon Flowers	151	0.4	+0.1
Marxist–Leninist	Dagmar M. Rappold	54	0.1	0.0
Total valid votes		39,145	100.0	

==== Richview-Islington: 1963-85 provincial elections ====
1963 Ontario general election
Party	Candidate	Votes	%	±%
Progressive Conservative	Leslie Rowntree	15,107	64.35	19.59
Liberal	Joan Neiman	6,305	26.86	-2.81
New Democratic	Henry Brennan	2,064	8.79	-16.78
Total valid votes/Eligible Voters		23,476		38,886
Turnout		23,588	60.66	9.03
Plurality		8,802	37.49	
Progressive Conservative hold		Swing		11.19
Source (vote tallies): "York West, 1963". Data Explorer. Elections Ontario.^ ±% for NDP calculated against CCF in 1959 election

1967 Ontario general election
Party	Candidate	Votes	%	±%
Progressive Conservative	Leslie Rowntree	14,780	47.53	-16.82
Liberal	Joan Neiman	12,429	39.97	13.12
New Democratic	Jacqueline Shepherd	3,885	12.49	3.70
Total valid votes/Eligible Voters		31,094		47,574
Turnout		31,288	65.77	5.11
Plurality		2,351	7.56	
Progressive Conservative hold		Swing		-14.96
Source (vote tallies): "York West, 1967". Data Explorer. Elections Ontario.

1971 Ontario general election
Party	Candidate	Votes	%	±%
Progressive Conservative	John Palmer MacBeth	26,034	59.41	11.88
Liberal	David Rattray	12,452	28.42	-11.56
New Democratic	Ted Culp	5,335	12.17	-0.32
Total valid votes/Eligible Voters		43,821		56,602
Turnout		43,955	77.66	11.89
Plurality		13,582	30.99	
Progressive Conservative hold		Swing		11.71
Source (vote tallies): "York West, 1971". Data Explorer. Elections Ontario.

1975 Ontario general election
Party	Candidate	Votes	%	±%
Progressive Conservative	Nick Leluk	13,871	38.70	-20.71
Liberal	Joseph Cruden	12,515	34.92	6.50
New Democratic	Ian Barrett	9,454	26.38	14.20
Total valid votes/Eligible Voters		35,840		50,544
Turnout		36,051	71.33	-6.33
Plurality		1,356	3.78	
Progressive Conservative hold		Swing		-13.60
Source (vote tallies): "York West, 1975". Data Explorer. Elections Ontario.

1977 Ontario general election
Party	Candidate	Votes	%	±%
Progressive Conservative	Nick Leluk	16,538	46.25	7.55
Liberal	Ernest Farrow	10,450	29.22	-5.69
New Democratic	Ian Barrett	8,510	23.8	-2.58
Libertarian	Ronald Vaughan	260	0.73	
Total valid votes/Eligible Voters		35,758		52,976
Turnout		35,963	67.89	-3.44
Plurality		6,088	17.03	
Progressive Conservative hold		Swing		6.63
Source (vote tallies): "York West, 1977". Data Explorer. Elections Ontario.

1981 Ontario general election
Party	Candidate	Votes	%	±%
Progressive Conservative	Nick Leluk	18,501	57.58	11.33
Liberal	Michael Eagen	10,228	31.83	2.61
New Democratic	Pauline Durning	2,865	8.92	-14.88
Independent	Donald Douloff	538	1.67	.
Total valid votes/Eligible Voters		32,132		55,673
Turnout		32,414	58.22	-9.66
Plurality		8,273	25.75	
Progressive Conservative hold		Swing		4.36
Source (vote tallies): "York West, 1981". Data Explorer. Elections Ontario.

1985 Ontario general election
Party	Candidate	Votes	%	±%
Progressive Conservative	Nick Leluk	14,595	39.98	-17.6
Liberal	Leonard Braithwaite	13,880	38.02	6.19
New Democratic	Philip Jones	6,930	18.98	10.07
Libertarian	Robert Dunk	1,099	3.01	
Total valid votes/Eligible Voters		36,504		56,746
Turnout		36,884	65.	6.78
Plurality		715	1.96	
Progressive Conservative hold		Swing		-11.90
Source (vote tallies): "York West, 1985". Data Explorer. Elections Ontario.

=== Jane and Finch ===
==== 1979–2011 federal elections ====
York West was again given new definition in 1976, shifting eastward with a resulting riding centered around the Jane & Finch area and entirely in North York. The electoral district remained anchored around the Jane & Finch area until its elimination in 2015, with further adjustments in 1987, 1996, 2003.

1980 Canadian federal election: York West
Party	Candidate	Votes	%	±%
Liberal	James Fleming	21,385	56.8	+9.7
New Democratic	Elio Costa	8,884	23.6	-3.4
Progressive Conservative	Don Cleveland	7,101	18.8	-6.0
Libertarian	Scott Hughes	194	0.5	-0.1
Communist	Nan McDonald	85	0.2	-0.2
Marxist–Leninist	Dagmar M. Rappold	29	0.1	-0.1
Total valid votes		37,678	100.0	
lop.parl.ca

1984 Canadian federal election: York West
Party	Candidate	Votes	%	±%
Liberal	Sergio Marchi	17,629	44.6	-12.2
Progressive Conservative	Frank Di Giorgio	12,218	30.9	+12.0
New Democratic	Bruno Pasquantonio	8,718	22.0	-1.5
Libertarian	Dusan Kubias	335	0.8	+0.3
Independent	Anna Esposito	279	0.7	
Green	Jutta I. Keylwerth	238	0.6	
Communist	Jack C. Sweet	147	0.4	+0.3
Total valid votes		39,564	100.0	

1988 Canadian federal election: York West
Party	Candidate	Votes	%	±%
Liberal	Sergio Marchi	19,936	59.6	+15.0
Progressive Conservative	Elizabeth Smith	6,368	19.1	-11.8
New Democratic	Alice Lambrinos	6,088	18.2	-3.8
Libertarian	Roma Kelembet	498	1.5	+0.7
Independent	Sherland R. Chhangur	270	0.8	
Independent	Gary Robert Walsh	145	0.4	
Communist	Jack C. Sweet	119	0.4	0.0
Total valid votes		33,424	100.0	

1993 Canadian federal election: York West
Party	Candidate	Votes	%	±%
Liberal	Sergio Marchi	25,356	79.8	+20.2
Reform	Bruce A. Castleman	3,385	10.7	-8.4
Progressive Conservative	Marguerite Bebluk	1,506	4.7	-14.3
New Democratic	Rosanne Giulietti	1,074	3.4	-14.8
Natural Law	Claudio Paolini	209	0.7	
Marxist–Leninist	Jean-Paul Bédard	164	0.5	
Abolitionist	Ljiljana Medjedovic	82	0.3	
Total valid votes		31,776	100.0	

1997 Canadian federal election: York West
Party	Candidate	Votes	%	±%
Liberal	Sergio Marchi	21,254	73.6	-6.2
New Democratic	Lombe Chinkangala	2,853	9.9	+6.5
Reform	Ken Freeman	2,598	9.0	-1.7
Progressive Conservative	Richard Donovan	2,165	7.5	+2.8
Total valid votes		28,870	100.0	

Canadian federal by-election, November 15, 1999: York West
Party	Candidate	Votes	%	±%
Liberal	Judy Sgro	10,034	74.2	+0.5
Progressive Conservative	Elio Di Iorio	1,721	12.7	+5.2
New Democratic	Julia McCrea	1,054	7.8	-2.1
Reform	Enzo Granzotto	377	2.8	-6.2
Canadian Action	Stephen Burega	242	1.8	
Green	Henry Zeifman	101	0.7	
Total valid votes		13,529	100.0	
Liberal hold		Swing		+1.3
On resignation of MP Marchi (Appointed as Canadian Ambassador to the World Trade Organization

2000 Canadian federal election: York West
Party	Candidate	Votes	%	±%
Liberal	Judy Sgro	19,737	77.3	+3.1
Alliance	Munish Chandra	2,724	10.7	+7.9
New Democratic	Julia McCrea	2,361	9.2	+1.5
Marijuana	G. Marcello Marchetti	537	2.1	
Marxist–Leninist	Amarjit Dhillon	175	0.7	
Total valid votes		25,534	100.0	

Note: Canadian Alliance vote is compared to the Reform vote in 1997 election.

2004 Canadian federal election: York West
Party	Candidate	Votes	%	±%
Liberal	Judy Sgro	17,903	64.7	-12.6
New Democratic	Sandra Romano Anthony	4,228	15.2	+6.0
Conservative	Leslie Soobrian	3,120	11.2	+0.5
Christian Heritage	Joseph Grubb	1,580	5.7	
Green	Tim McKellar	824	3.0	
Total valid votes		27,655	100.0	

Note: Conservative vote is compared to the total of the Canadian Alliance vote and Progressive Conservative vote in 2000 election.

2006 Canadian federal election: York West
Party	Candidate	Votes	%	Expenditures
Liberal	Judy Sgro	21,418	63.78	$48,741.93
Conservative	Parm Gill	6,244	18.59	$71,005.65
New Democratic	Sandra Romano Anthony	4,724	14.07	$8,845.73
Green	Nick Capra	1,002	2.98	$1,692.18
Independent	Axcel Cocon	192	0.57	$1,801.61
Total valid votes		33,580	100.00	
Total rejected ballots		261		
Turnout		33,841	57.90	
Electors on the lists		58,450		

2008 Canadian federal election: York West
Party	Candidate	Votes	%	±%	Expenditures
Liberal	Judy Sgro	16,997	59.4	-4.4	$35,514
New Democratic	Giulio Manfrini	5,363	18.7	+4.6	$12,354
Conservative	Kevin Nguyen	4,773	16.7	-1.9	$12,960
Green	Nick Capra	1,488	5.2	+2.2	$1,557
Total valid votes/expense limit		28,621	100.0	$77,457	
Total rejected ballots		219	0.8		
Turnout		28,840	48.3		

2011 Canadian federal election: York West
Party	Candidate	Votes	%	±%	Expenditures
Liberal	Judy Sgro	13,030	47.0	-12.4	
New Democratic	Giulio Manfrini	7,721	27.8	+9.1	
Conservative	Audrey Walters	6,122	22.1	+5.4	
Green	Unblind Tibben	450	1.6	-3.6	
Christian Heritage	George Okoth Otura	231	0.8	–	
Canadian Action	Arthur Smitherman	170	0.6	–	
Total valid votes/expense limit		27,724	100.0		
Total rejected ballots		267	1.0	+0.2	
Turnout		27,991	48.2	-0.1	
Eligible voters		57,287	–	–	

==== 1999–2014 provincial elections ====
1999 Ontario general election
Party	Candidate	Votes	%	±%
Liberal	Mario Sergio	16,457	63.32	25.30
Progressive Conservative	Chris Collier	5,086	19.57	-20.41
New Democratic	Stephnie Payne	3,377	12.99	-5.99
Green	Anthony Davison	427	1.64	
Natural Law	Mark Scrafford	299	1.15	
Independent	S. Nicholas C. Lin	194	0.75	
Independent	Rosemary Ann Ray	149	0.57	
Total valid votes/Eligible Voters		25,989		49,959
Turnout		26,571	53.19	-11.81
Plurality		11,371	43.75	
Liberal hold		Swing		8.52
Source (vote tallies): "York West, 1999". Data Explorer. Elections Ontario.^ ±% and swing calculated against 1995 results in Yorkview, previously represented by Sergio and merged into York West in its entirety, along with 31% of Downsview.

2003 Ontario general election
Party	Candidate	Votes	%	±%
Liberal	Mario Sergio	16,102	69.31	+5.99
New Democratic	Garth Bobb	3,954	17.02	4.03
Progressive Conservative	Ted Aver	2,330	10.03	-9.54
Green	Richard von Fuchs	437	1.88	0.24
Communist	Christopher Black	408	1.76	
Total valid votes/Eligible Voters		23,231		53,454
Turnout		23,495	43.95	-9.23
Plurality		12,148	52.29	
Liberal hold		Swing		-0.98
Source (vote tallies): "York West, 2003". Data Explorer. Elections Ontario.

2007 Ontario general election
Party	Candidate	Votes	%	±%
Liberal	Mario Sergio	13,246	54.74	-14.58
New Democratic	Antoni Shelton	6,764	27.95	10.93
Progressive Conservative	Shane O'Toole	2,484	10.26	0.23
GP	Sergio Pagnotta	1,199	4.95	3.07
Family Coalition	Julia Carvalho	282	1.17	
Independent	Ram Narula	225	0.93	
Total valid votes/Eligible Voters		24,200		55,355
Turnout		24,602	44.44	0.49
Plurality		6,482	26.79	
Liberal hold		Swing		-12.75
Source (vote tallies): "York West, 2007". Data Explorer. Elections Ontario.

2011 Ontario general election
Party	Candidate	Votes	%	±%
Liberal	Mario Sergio	11,455	50.49	-4.54
New Democratic	Tom Rakocevic	7,901	34.82	+7.17
Progressive Conservative	Karlene Nation	2,735	12.05	+1.78
Green	Joseph Rini	287	1.26	-3.68
Independent	Leland W. Cornell	114	0.50	
Freedom	Kayla Baptiste	107	0.47	
Independent	Scott Aitchison	89	0.39	
Total valid votes/Eligible Voters		22,688		58,255
Total rejected, unmarked and declined ballots		170	0.74	
Turnout		22,858	39.24	-5.21
Plurality		3,554	15.66	
Liberal hold		Swing		-5.55
Source (vote tallies): "York West, 2011". Data Explorer. Elections Ontario.

2014 Ontario general election
Party	Candidate	Votes	%	±%
Liberal	Mario Sergio	11,907	46.71	-3.78
New Democratic	Tom Rakocevic	9,997	39.21	+4.39
Progressive Conservative	Karlene Nation	2,794	10.96	-1.09
Green	Keith Jarrett	418	1.64	+0.38
Freedom	Kayla Baptiste	267	1.05	+0.58
Independent	Wally Schwauss	111	0.44	
Total valid votes		25,494	100.0	
Plurality				
Liberal hold		Swing		-4.18
Source (vote tallies): "York West, 2014". Data Explorer. Elections Ontario.

== Reference ==
=== Legislative sources for York West ===
- An Act for the better Division of this Province. Laws of His Majesty's province of Upper Canada. Vol. 38 George III. 1798. c.5.
  West Riding of the County of York. XXII. And be it further enacted by the authority aforesaid, That the Townships of Beverly and Flamborough, the latter divided into Flamborough East and West, so much of the tract of land upon the Grand River in the occupation of the Six Nation Indians, as lies to the northward of Dundas street, and all the land between the said tract and the East Riding of the County of York, with the reserved lands in the rear of the Townships of Blenheim and Blanford, do constitute and form the West Riding of the County of York.
- An Act for the more equal Representation of the Commons of this Province in Parliament and for the better defining the Qualification of Electors (s.24). Statutes of His Majesty's province of Upper Canada. Vol. 40 George III. 1800. c.3.
- An Act for the better Representation of the Commons of this Province in Parliament. Statutes of His Majesty's province of Upper Canada. Vol. 48 George III. 1808. c.8.
- An Act for better defining the limits of the Counties and Districts in Upper Canada etc. Statutes of the Province of Canada. Vol. 8 Victoria. 1845. ch. 7, sch. B.
  York, — Which shall be divided, as it now is, into four Ridings, each returning one Member to the Legislative Assembly, that is to say:...The West Riding, — Which shall include and consist of the Townships of Albion, Caledon, Chinguacousy, Toronto Gore, and Toronto.
- An Act to enlarge the Representation of the People of this Province in Parliament (s.4). Statutes of the Province of Canada. Vol. 16 Victoria. 1853. ch. 152 sch.II.
  "The West Riding, which shall consist of the Townships of Etobicoke, Vaughan, and that portion of the Township of York lying West of Yonge Street."
- British North America Act, 1867 (c.3, 1st schedule, Electoral Districts of Ontario, Part A. Existing Electoral Divisions). Statutes of the United Kingdom. Vol. 30-31 Victoria. 1867. s.13.
- An Act to attach the Village of Richmond Hill to the Electoral District of the West Riding of the County of York. Statutes of the Dominion of Canada. Vol. 37 Victoria. 1874. ch. 12.
- An Act to re-adjust the Representation in the Legislative Assembly. Statutes of the Province of Ontario. Vol. 38 Victoria. 1874. ch. 2.
  s.19 …the West Riding of the County of York shall include the whole of the Village of Richmond Hill…
- The Franchise and Representation Act, 1885. Statutes of the Province of Ontario. Vol. 48 Victoria. 1885. ch. 2.
- Representation Act, 1908. Statutes of the Province of Ontario. Vol. 8 Edward VII. 1908. ch. 2.
  s.91 The Electoral District of West York to consist of the Townships of Etobicoke and Vaughan and that portion of the Township of York lying west of Yonge Street, the City of West Toronto, and the Villages of Weston and Woodbridge.
- Representation Act, 1914. Statutes of the Province of Ontario. Vol. 4 George V. 1914. ch. 4. (substantially the same as 1908)
- Representation Act, 1925. Statutes of the Province of Ontario. Vol. 15 George V. ch.7.
  The Electoral District of West York to consist of all that portion of the Township of York lying west of a line drawn as follows: Commencing at the limits of the City of Toronto at the intersection of the centre line of Weston Road and the centre line of Northlands Avenue, thence northerly along the centre line of Weston Road to its intersection with Lambton Avenue, thence westerly along the centre line of Lambton Avenue to the Humber River, the Township of Etobicoke, and the Towns of Mimico, New Toronto and Weston
- Representation Act, 1933. Statutes of the Province of Ontario. Vol. 23 George V. ch.56. (Substantially the same as 1925)
- Representation Act, 1954. Statutes of the Province of Ontario. Vol. 3 Elizabeth. ch.84.
  The Electoral District of York West — to consist of that portion of the Township of Etobicoke not included in the Electoral District of York-Humber; the Town of New Toronto and the Village of Long Branch.
- Representation Amendment Act, 1962-63. Statutes of the Province of Ontario. Vol. 11-12 Elizabeth. ch.125.
  The Electoral District of York West — to consist of all that portion of the Township of Etobicoke bounded on the north by the centre line of Richview Side Road and its easterly production to the east limit of the Township and bounded on the south by a line drawn as follows: Commencing at a point in the west limit of the Township where it is intersected by the centre line of the Canadian Pacific Railway right-ofway; thence northeasterly along the centre line of the said Railway right-of-way to its intersection with the centre line of Bloor Street Wrest; thence easterly along the centre line of Bloor Street West to the east limit of the Township.
- Representation Act, 1966. Statutes of the Province of Ontario. Vol. 14-15 Elizabeth. ch.137. (substantially the same as 1963)
- The Representation Act, 1975. Statutes of the Province of Ontario. Vol. 24 Elizabeth II. ch.13.
  to consist of that portion of the Borough of Etobicoke lying within the following limits: Commencing at the intersection of the Canadian Pacific Railway line and the Westerly boundary of the Borough oi Etobicoke; thence northerly, easterly and northerly along said westerly boundary to the Maedonald-Cartier Freeway; thence easterly and northeasterly along said Freeway to Kipling Avenue; thence southerly along Kipling Avenue to the Canadian Pacific Railway line; thence southwesterly along said railway line to the point of commencement
- Electoral Boundaries Readjustment Act of 1914. Statutes of Canada. Vol. S.C.1914. 1914. c.51.
- Representation Act, 1924. Statutes of Canada. Vol. S.C.1924. 1924. c.63, schedule, p.227.
- Representation Act, 1933. Statutes of Canada. Vol. S.C.1933. 1933. c.54, schedule Ontario, s.71 on p.305.
- Representation Act, 1947. Statutes of Canada. Vol. S.C.1947. 1947. c.71, schedule.
- The Representation Act, 1952. Statutes of Canada. Vol. 1 Elizabeth. 1952. c.48.
- Electoral Boundaries Readjustment Act. Statutes of Canada. Vol. S.C.1964-65. 1964. c.31.
- "York West, Ontario (1917-10-06 - 2015-08-01)". Parliament of Canada. Library of Parliament, Parliament of Canada.
Federal electoral boundaries have been prescribed in representation orders since the enactment of the Electoral Boundaries Readjustment Act in 1964. In addition to the above legislations, each contains specific boundary description for York West, York West appeared in the following six representation orders.
- Representation Order, 1966
- 1976
- 1987
- 1996
- 2003
- 2013 (SI/2013-102)
The description of York West as prescribed by legislations and orders between 1917 and 2013 are reproduced on the page linked above in the Library of Parliament website.
- An Act to change the names of certain electoral districts and to amend the Electoral Boundaries Readjustment Act (s.24). Statutes of Canada. Vol. S.C.2014. 2014. c.19.
24. In the representation order declared in force by proclamation of October 1, 2013 under the Electoral Boundaries Readjustment Act, paragraph 121 of the part relating to Ontario is amended by substituting the name “Humber River — Black Creek” for the name “York West”.
