= Thomas Grahame =

Canadian politician

Ontario MPP
- In office 1867–1871
- Preceded by: Riding created
- Succeeded by: Peter Patterson
- Constituency: York West

Personal details
- Born: March 20, 1840 Vaughan Township, Upper Canada
- Died: May 7, 1907 (aged 57) London, England
- Party: Conservative

Thomas Grahame (March 20, 1840 – May 7, 1907) was an Ontario political figure. He represented York West in the Legislative Assembly of Ontario as a Conservative member from 1867 to 1871.

He was born in Vaughan Township, Upper Canada in 1840 and educated at Upper Canada College, the University of Toronto and the University of Glasgow, the son of a Scottish immigrant who later returned to Scotland.

He died in London in 1907.

== Electoral history ==
1867 Ontario general election: York West
Party	Candidate	Votes	%	±%
Conservative	Thomas Grahame	587	46.44	
Liberal	Dr. Bull	514	40.66	
Independent	W. Tyrrell	163	12.90	
Total valid votes/Eligible Voters		1,264		2,229
Turnout		1,264	56.71	
Plurality		73	5.78	
Conservative gain		Swing		(Note: Liberal held seat in the 8th and final legislative assembly of the Province of Canada)
Source (vote tallies): "York West, 1867". Data Explorer. Elections Ontario.

1871 Ontario general election: York West
Party	Candidate	Votes	%	±%
Liberal	Peter Patterson	865	56.32	+15.65
Conservative	Thomas Grahame	671	43.68	−2.76
Turnout		1,536	62.54	+5.83
Eligible voters		2,456		
Plurality		194	12.63	
Liberal gain from Conservative		Swing		+9.20
Source: Elections Ontario
