= Peter Patterson (politician) =

Canadian politician

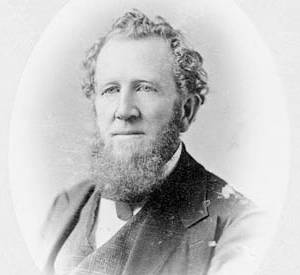
- Peter Patterson; Source: Library and Archives Canada

Ontario MPP
- In office 1871–1883
- Preceded by: Thomas Grahame
- Succeeded by: John Gray
- Constituency: York West

Personal details
- Born: April 10, 1825 Londonderry, New Hampshire, U.S.
- Died: July 24, 1904 (aged 79) Vaughan, Ontario, Canada
- Party: Liberal
- Profession: Businessman

Peter Patterson (April 10, 1825 – July 24, 1904) was an Ontario businessman and political figure. He represented York West in Legislative Assembly of Ontario, Canada, from 1871 to 1883.

He was born in Londonderry, New Hampshire in 1825 and came to Canada West in 1849. Patterson and his brothers, operating as Patterson Brothers, manufactured agricultural equipment in the Richmond Hill area. They also operated a sawmill, gristmill, foundry and blacksmith shop. The company provided living quarters for their workers, a school and church near the factory. Peter served as reeve for Vaughan Township from 1868 to 1871. In 1886, the operation was relocated to Woodstock to gain access to cheaper transportation via rail. The company was taken over by Massey-Harris in 1891. He died at Vaughan in 1904.

== Electoral history ==
1871 Ontario general election: York West
Party	Candidate	Votes	%	±%
Liberal	Peter Patterson	865	56.32	+15.65
Conservative	Thomas Grahame	671	43.68	−2.76
Turnout		1,536	62.54	+5.83
Eligible voters		2,456		
Plurality		194	12.63	
Liberal gain from Conservative		Swing		+9.20
Source: Elections Ontario

1875 Ontario general election: York West
Party	Candidate	Votes	%	±%
Liberal	Peter Patterson	Acclaimed		
Source: Elections Ontario
