= Elmer Brandon =

Canadian politician

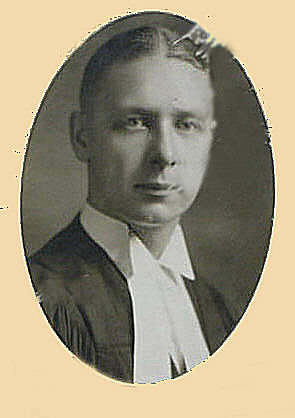
- Graduation photo from Osgoode Hall Law School

Ontario MPP
- In office 1951–1956
- Preceded by: Charles Millard
- Succeeded by: Leslie Rowntree
- Constituency: York West

Personal details
- Born: William Elmer Brandon; June 16, 1906 Swansea, Toronto, Ontario
- Died: July 2, 1956 (aged 50) Toronto, Ontario
- Party: Progressive Conservative
- Spouse: Ruth Wales
- Children: 2
- Occupation: Lawyer

William Elmer Brandon (June 16, 1906 – July 2, 1956) was an Ontario politician and lawyer. He represented York West from 1951 to 1956 in the Legislative Assembly of Ontario as a Progressive Conservative.

== Background ==
Brandon was born in Toronto, the son of William Brandon and Matilda Gregg. He attended Alexander Muir Public School, Parkdale Collegiate Institute and the University of Toronto. He graduated from Osgoode Hall Law School and entered the legal profession in 1933.

He and his wife Ruth had two children, Barbara and Ewart.

== Politics ==
In 1940 he was elected to Swansea village council serving as Reeve from 1941 to 1944 and again from 1945 to 1951. He also served as the warden of York County.

In 1951 he ran as the Progressive Conservative in the riding of York West. He beat CCF incumbent Charles Millard. He was re-elected in 1955. He died in office on July 2, 1956.
