= Joseph St. John =

Joseph W. St. John
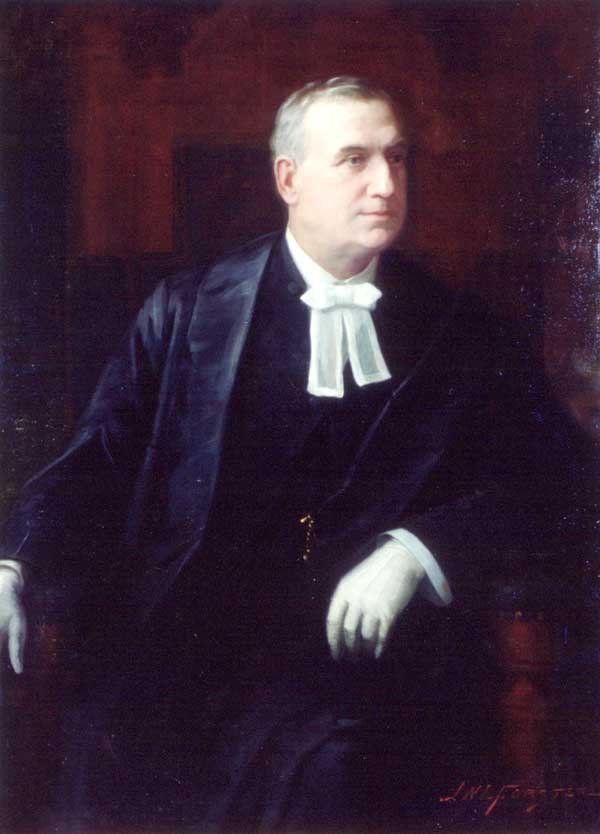

Ontario MPP
- In office 1902–1907
- Preceded by: William Hill
- Succeeded by: Forbes Godfrey
- Constituency: York West
- In office 1894–1898
- Preceded by: John Gilmour
- Succeeded by: William Hill
- Constituency: York West

Personal details
- Born: July 17, 1854 Brock Township, Canada West
- Died: April 7, 1907 (aged 52)
- Party: Conservative
- Profession: Lawyer

Joseph Wesley St. John (July 17, 1854 – April 7, 1907) was speaker of the Legislature of Ontario from 1905 to 1907 and served as Conservative MLA for York West from 1894 to 1898 and from 1902 to 1907.

He was born in Brock Township, Canada West in 1854, the son of James St. John, and educated at Victoria University in Cobourg. He studied law, was called to the bar in 1894 and set up practice in Toronto. He was defeated when he ran for reelection in 1898 but was reelected in 1902. St. John also served in the Senate for the University of Toronto. He died in office in 1907.
