= Thomas George Wallace =

Canadian politician

Member of Parliament for York West
- In office 1917–1920
- Preceded by: Riding established
- Succeeded by: Henry Drayton

Member of Parliament for York Centre
- In office 1908–1917
- Preceded by: Peter McLean
- Succeeded by: Riding abolished

Personal details
- Born: May 7, 1879 Ottawa, Ontario, Canada
- Died: February 20, 1921 (aged 41)
- Party: Conservative; Unionist
- Relations: Nathaniel Clarke Wallace, father
- Profession: Merchant

Thomas George Wallace (May 7, 1879 – February 20, 1921) was a Canadian Member of Parliament for the Ontario ridings of York Centre and then York West.

Wallace was born in Ottawa, Ontario, on May 7, 1879. His father Nathaniel Clarke Wallace was elected MP for York West in the general election held the year prior, went on to serve in the Thompson ministry and the Bowell ministry in a sub-cabinet role as the Controller of Customs, and represented the district in the 4th to the 9th parliaments until his death in 1901. The younger Wallace would represent the district when it was recreated in the 13th parliament before dying in office himself 20 years later.

Wallace served as a private in the Royal Canadian Regiment during the Second Boer War, serving overseas in South Africa. He later worked as a merchant and miller.

In 1907, Wallace contested a by-election held in York Centre, losing by 26 votes (out of more than 4,500 votes cast) before capturing the seat by a 45-vote margin in the 1908 federal election. He served in the House of Commons as a member of the Conservative Party. He was re-elected in 1911 with a more comfortable margin.

In the redistribution that took effect in the 1917 election, York Centre shed all areas east of Yonge and reconstituted York West. Wallace was elected under the Unionist Party banner in the much more favourable territory with a stunning vote share of over 80%, the second highest of any candidate in Ontario.

Thomas George Wallace died in office on February 20, 1921, at the age of 41.

== Electoral record ==
Canadian federal by-election, 23 December 1907
Party	Candidate	Votes	%	±%
On Mr. Campbell being called to the Senate, 22 November 1907
Liberal	Peter Douglas McLean	2,282	50.3	-0.6
Conservative	T.G. Wallace	2,256	49.7	+0.6
Total valid votes		4,538	100.0	

1908 Canadian federal election
Party	Candidate	Votes	%	±%
Conservative	Thomas George Wallace	2,614	50.4	+0.7
Liberal	Peter Douglas McLean	2,569	49.6	-0.7
Total valid votes		5,183	100.0	

1911 Canadian federal election
Party	Candidate	Votes	%	±%
Conservative	Thomas George Wallace	2,838	54.9	+4.5
Liberal	Herbert Hartly Dewart	2,328	45.1	-4.5
Total valid votes		5,166	100.0	

1917 Canadian federal election: York West
Party	Candidate	Votes	%	±%
Government (Unionist)	Thomas George Wallace	11,930	80.7	-
Opposition (Laurier Liberals)	Frank Denton	2,856	19.3	-
Total valid votes		14,786	100.0	-
Note: Electoral district re-created from York Centre and York South
