= Peter Douglas McLean =

Canadian politician

Member of Parliament for York Centre
- In office 1907–1908
- Preceded by: Archibald Campbell
- Succeeded by: Tom Wallace

Personal details
- Born: September 24, 1856 Oro Township, Canada West
- Died: April 4, 1936 (aged 79)
- Party: Liberal
- Profession: Teacher, doctor

Peter Douglas McLean (September 24, 1856 – April 4, 1936) was an educator, physician and political figure in Ontario, Canada. He represented York Centre in the House of Commons of Canada from 1907 to 1908 as a Liberal.

He was born in Oro Township, Canada West and was educated in Barrie and at the University of Toronto. McLean taught school in Craighurst, Simcoe and Edgar. He practised medicine at Woodbridge from 1881. He also served on the municipal council for Woodbridge. McLean was defeated when he ran for reelection to the House of Commons in 1908. He died in Woodbridge at the age of 79.
