= William James Gardhouse =

Canadian politician

William Gardhouse

Ontario MPP
- In office 1934–1943
- Preceded by: Henry Isaac Price
- Succeeded by: Charles Millard
- Constituency: York West

Personal details
- Born: September 1, 1880 Highfield, Ontario
- Died: October 6, 1950 (aged 70) Toronto, Ontario
- Party: Liberal
- Spouse: Alice Garbutt (m. 1905)
- Occupation: Farmer

William James Gardhouse (September 1, 1880 – October 6, 1950) was a farmer, livestock breeder and politician in Ontario, Canada. He represented York West in the Legislative Assembly of Ontario from 1934 to 1943 as a Liberal.

The son of John Gardhouse and Mary Alice Dickson, he was born in Highfield (now part of Etobicoke) and was educated at the Ontario Agricultural College. In 1905, he married the Alice Garbutt. He served on the Thistledown School Board. Gardhouse was warden for York County. He served as reeve of Etobicoke from 1921 to 1924 and in 1932.

Gardhouse ran unsuccessfully for a seat in the Ontario assembly in 1932; he was elected in 1934 and re-elected in 1937.

He suffered a heart attack in 1947 and died three years later at the age of 70.
