= Forbes Godfrey =

Ontario MPP
- In office 1907–1932
- Preceded by: Joseph St. John
- Succeeded by: Henry Isaac Price
- Constituency: York West

Personal details
- Born: March 31, 1867 Monck Township
- Died: January 6, 1932 (aged 64) Toronto, Ontario
- Party: Conservative
- Profession: Physician

Forbes Elliott Godfrey (March 31, 1867 – January 6, 1932) was an Ontario physician and political figure. He represented York West in the Legislative Assembly of Ontario as a Conservative member from 1907 to 1932.

== Background ==
He was born in Monck Township, the son of Methodist Minister Robert Godfrey. Godfrey was educated at the University of Toronto and the University of Edinburgh. He set up a medical practice with his partner which ran from his house on Albert Avenue in the Town of Mimico. On his death the Town of Mimico observed a day of mourning.

== Politics ==
Godfrey was elected in a 1907 by-election held after the death of Joseph Wesley St. John. He served as Minister of Labour from 1923 to 1930 and Minister of Health from 1924 to 1930.

=== Cabinet positions ===
Ferguson ministry, Province of Ontario (1923–1930)
Cabinet posts (2)
Predecessor	Office	Successor
Walter Rollo	Minister of Labour; 1923-1930	Joseph Monteith
New position	Minister of Health; 1924-1930	John Morrow Robb

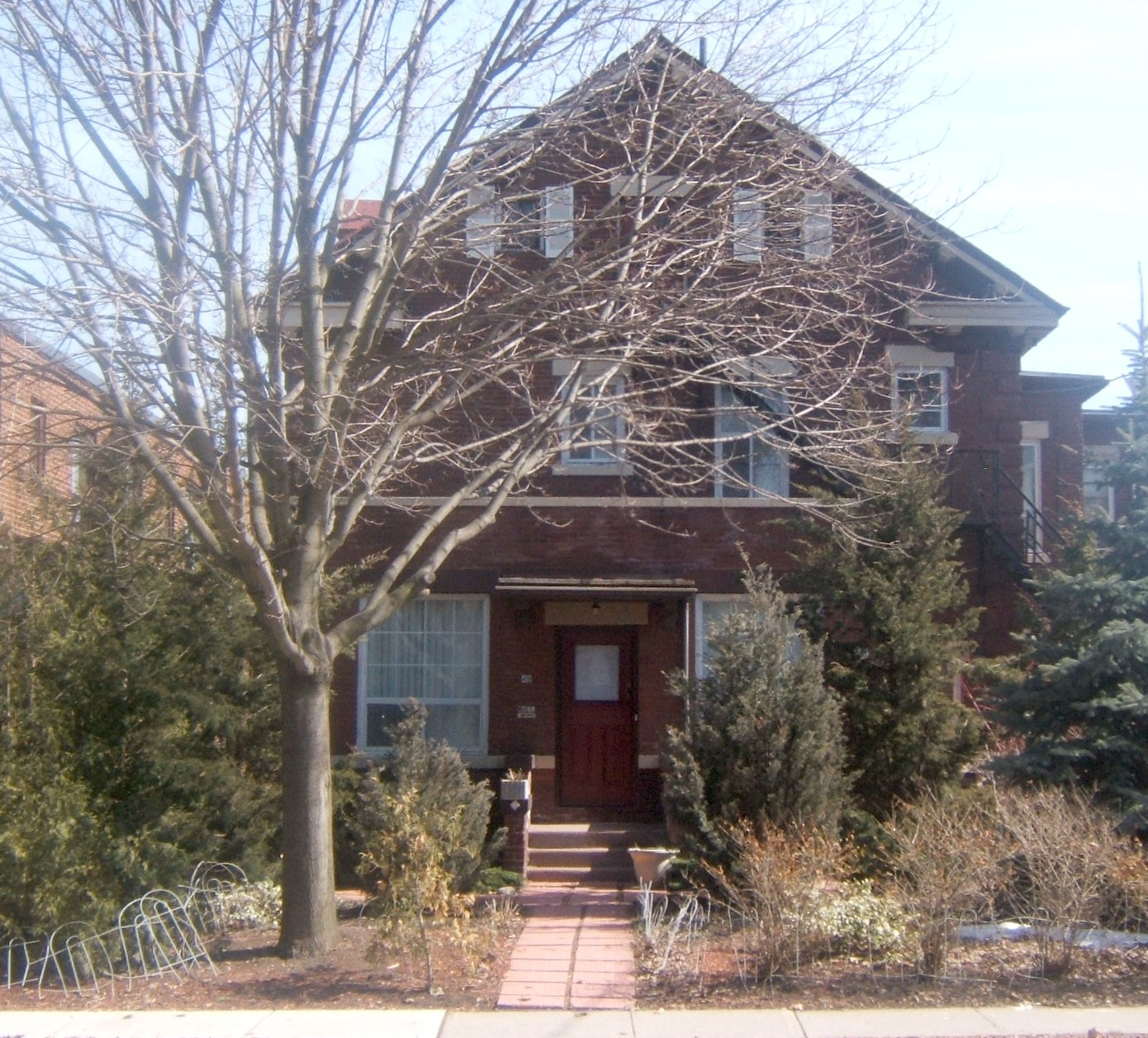
Former Dr Forbes Godfrey House, Stanley Ave Side (Front on Albert now hidden)
