= John Gray (Ontario politician) =

Canadian politician

Lieutenant Colonel John Gray

Ontario MPP
- In office 1883–1886
- Preceded by: Peter Patterson
- Succeeded by: John Gilmour
- Constituency: York West

Personal details
- Born: January 5, 1837 York County, Upper Canada
- Died: February 14, 1917 (aged 80) Toronto, Ontario
- Party: Conservative
- Spouse: Catherine Calverley

John Gray (January 5, 1837 – February 14, 1917) was an Ontario horticulturalist and political figure. He represented York West in the Legislative Assembly of Ontario as a Conservative member from 1883 to 1886.

He was born in York County, Upper Canada in 1837, the son of John Gray, an Irish immigrant. He married Catherine Calverley in 1861. Gray served as a major in the militia, commanding the Toronto Field Battery. He was reeve for Parkdale from 1879 to 1881 and was also a member of the local Masonic lodge.

He died February 14, 1917.
