= William James Hill =

Canadian politician (1854–1922)

William Hill

Ontario MPP
- In office 1898–1902
- Preceded by: Joseph St. John
- Succeeded by: Joseph St. John
- Constituency: York West

Personal details
- Born: December 21, 1854 Toronto, Canada West
- Died: October 11, 1922 (aged 67) Toronto, Ontario
- Party: Liberal
- Spouse: Hannah Bloor
- Profession: Bricklayer

William James Hill (December 21, 1854 – October 11, 1922) was an Ontario construction contractor and political figure. He represented York West in the Legislative Assembly of Ontario from 1898 to 1902 as a Liberal member.

He was born in Toronto, the son of Methodist minister William Hill who came to Upper Canada from Yorkshire, England, and was educated in Toronto. He apprenticed as a bricklayer and later established himself as a contractor. Hill served on the public school board, Toronto City Council and served as reeve for York Township from 1894 to 1897. He married Hannah B. Bloor. He previously ran unsuccessfully for a seat in the provincial legislature in 1894.
