= Tom Rakocevic =

Canadian politician

Tom Rakocevic MPP
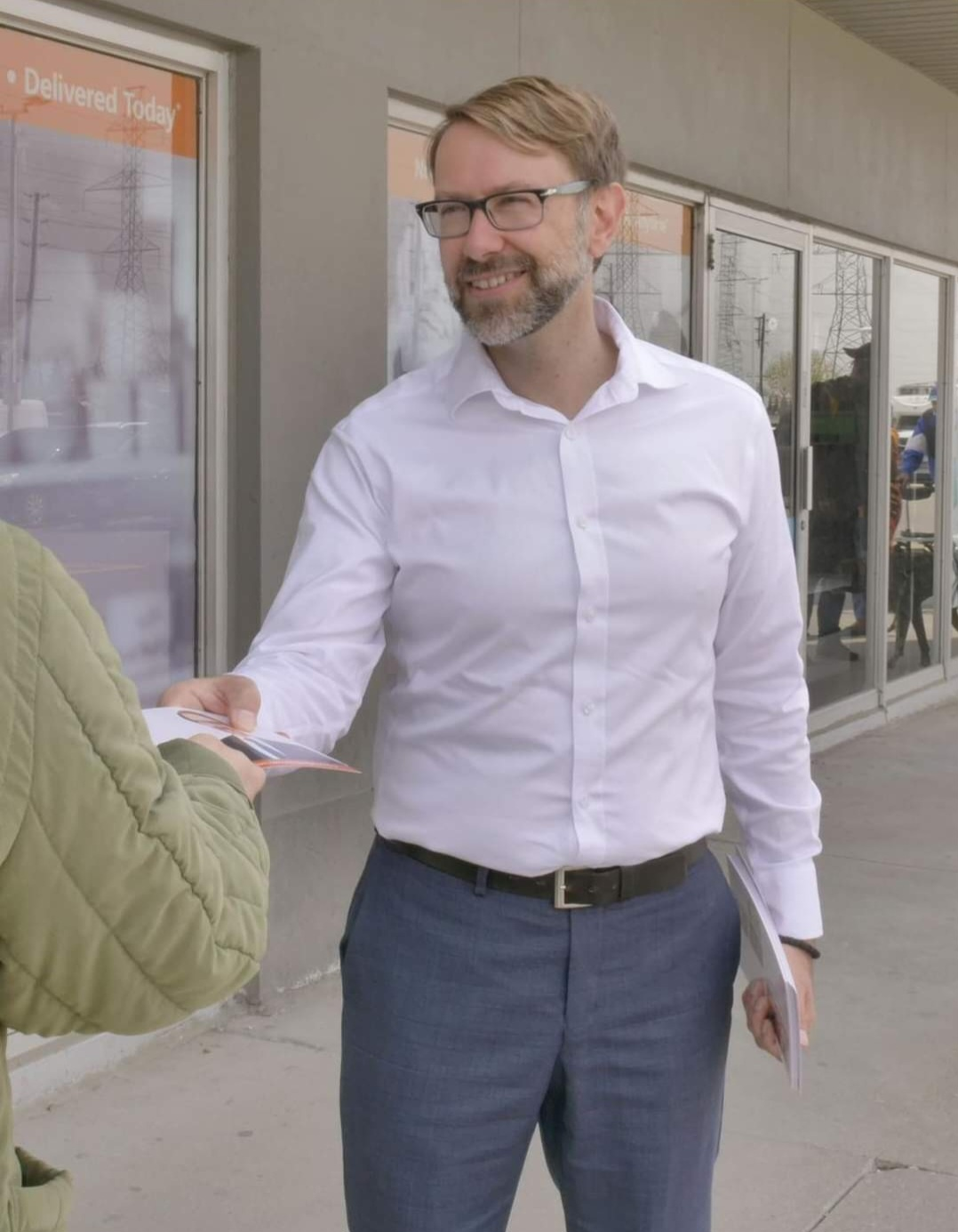
- Rakocevic in 2022

Critic, Consumer Protection
- In office July 13, 2022 – Present
- Leader: Marit Stiles

Critic, Auto Insurance
- In office July 13, 2022 – Present
- Leader: Marit Stiles

Critic, Government Services and Consumer Protection
- In office August 23, 2018 – February 2, 2021
- Leader: Andrea Horwath

Member of the Ontario Provincial Parliament for Humber River—Black Creek
- Incumbent
- Assumed office June 7, 2018
- Preceded by: Mario Sergio

Personal details
- Party: New Democratic
- Occupation: Executive assistant

Tom Rakocevic (/rɑːˈkoʊtʃɛvɪtʃ/ rah-KOH-chev-itch) is a Canadian politician, who was elected to the Legislative Assembly of Ontario in the 2018 provincial election, and again in the 2022 provincial election, and again in the 2025 Ontario general election. He represents the riding of Humber River—Black Creek as a member of the Ontario New Democratic Party. Rakocevic is the first NDP representative in the riding's history to win three consecutive terms.

He was previously the party's candidate in York West in the provincial elections of 2011 and 2014. Prior to his election to the legislature, he was employed as an executive assistant to Toronto city councillor Anthony Perruzza.

== Political career ==
Rakocevic was first elected to the Legislative Assembly of Ontario in the 2018 provincial election in the riding of Humber River—Black Creek.

He was reelected in the 2022 provincial election.

Since being elected, he has been a frequent advocate for stronger consumer protection laws. In 2022, Rakocevic tabled the Ontario Consumer Watchdog Act, which would have created an independent provincial consumer protection agency. The bill was defeated on March 9, 2022, after the Progressive Conservative Party voted against it.

Rakocevic has also advocated for measures to lower the cost of car insurance in Ontario.

In January 2024, Rakocevic denounced the Ontario government's decision to outsource a number of Service Ontario locations to Staples.

As of August 11, 2024, he serves as the Official Opposition's critic for Consumer Protection and for Auto Insurance.

== Electoral record ==
2025 Ontario general election: Humber River—Black Creek
| Party | Candidate | Votes | % | ±% | Expenditures |
|---|---|---|---|---|---|
| New Democratic | Tom Rakocevic | 8,788 | 35.33 | +0.84 | $107,102 |
| Progressive Conservative | Paul Nguyen | 8,595 | 34.55 | +4.80 | $50,401 |
| Liberal | Liban Hassan | 6,811 | 27.38 | –3.28 | $84,963 |
| Green | Alexander Qanbery | 402 | 1.62 | –0.25 | $0 |
| Communist | Jeanne McGuire | 280 | 1.13 | – | $0 |
| Total valid votes/expense limit | | 24,876 | 98.70 | – | $117,711 |
| Total rejected, unmarked and declined ballots | | 328 | 1.30 | –0.14 | |
| Turnout | | 25,204 | 34.65 | +1.50 | |
| Eligible voters | | 72,740 | | | |
| New Democratic hold | | Swing | | –1.98 | |
Source: Elections Ontario

2022 Ontario general election: Humber River—Black Creek
| Party | Candidate | Votes | % | ±% | Expenditures |
|---|---|---|---|---|---|
| New Democratic | Tom Rakocevic | 7,959 | 34.49 | –2.93 | $92,545 |
| Liberal | Ida Li Preti | 7,076 | 30.66 | +2.72 | $64,439 |
| Progressive Conservative | Paul Nguyen | 6,865 | 29.75 | –0.54 | $63,667 |
| Green | Keith Berry | 430 | 1.86 | +0.30 | $1,068 |
| Ontario Party | Lee Miguel Gonzalez | 357 | 1.55 | – | $4,264 |
| New Blue | Iulian Caunei | 281 | 1.22 | – | $1,023 |
| Independent | Knia Singh | 110 | 0.48 | – | $1,296 |
| Total valid votes/expense limit | | 23,078 | 98.56 | – | $98,948 |
| Total rejected, unmarked and declined ballots | | 337 | 1.44 | +0.17 | |
| Turnout | | 23,415 | 33.15 | –14.11 | |
| Eligible voters | | 70,632 | | | |
| New Democratic hold | | Swing | | ▼2.83 | |
Source: Elections Ontario

2018 Ontario general election: Humber River—Black Creek
| Party | Candidate | Votes | % | ±% |
|---|---|---|---|---|
| New Democratic | Tom Rakocevic | 11,573 | 37.41 | -1.80 |
| Progressive Conservative | Cyma Musarat | 9,367 | 30.29 | +19.33 |
| Liberal | Deanna Sgro | 8,642 | 27.94 | -18.77 |
| Green | Kirsten J. Bennett | 485 | 1.57 | -0.07 |
| Libertarian | Jennifer Ochoa | 344 | 1.11 | |
| Consensus Ontario | Scott Aitchison | 320 | 1.03 | |
| Trillium | Lucy Guerrero | 198 | 0.64 | |
| Total valid votes | | 30,929 | 100.0 | |
| Total rejected, unmarked and declined ballots | | 397 | | |
| Turnout | | 48.34 | | |
| Eligible voters | | | | |
| New Democratic gain from Liberal | | Swing | | +1.26 |
Source: Elections Ontario

2014 Ontario general election: York West
| Party | Candidate | Votes | % | ±% |
|---|---|---|---|---|
| Liberal | Mario Sergio | 11,907 | 46.71 | -3.78 |
| New Democratic | Tom Rakocevic | 9,997 | 39.21 | +4.39 |
| Progressive Conservative | Karlene Nation | 2,794 | 10.96 | -1.09 |
| Green | Keith Jarrett | 418 | 1.64 | +0.38 |
| Freedom | Kayla Baptiste | 267 | 1.05 | +0.58 |
| Independent | Wally Schwauss | 111 | 0.44 | |
| Total valid votes | | 25,494 | 100.0 | |
| Liberal hold | | Swing | | -4.18 |
Source: Elections Ontario

2011 Ontario general election: York West
| Party | Candidate | Votes | % | ±% |
|---|---|---|---|---|
| Liberal | Mario Sergio | 11,455 | 50.49 | -4.54 |
| New Democratic | Tom Rakocevic | 7,901 | 34.82 | +7.17 |
| Progressive Conservative | Karlene Nation | 2,735 | 12.05 | +1.78 |
| Green | Joseph Rini | 287 | 1.26 | -3.68 |
| Independent | Leland W. Cornell | 114 | 0.50 | |
| Freedom | Kayla Baptiste | 107 | 0.47 | |
| Independent | Scott Aitchison | 89 | 0.39 | |
| Total valid votes | | 22,688 | 100.00 | |
| Total rejected, unmarked and declined ballots | | 170 | 0.74 | |
| Turnout | | 22,858 | 39.24 | |
| Eligible voters | | 58,255 | | |
| Liberal hold | | Swing | | -5.86 |
Source: Elections Ontario
