= John Taylor Gilmour =

Canadian politician

John Gilmour

Ontario MPP
- In office 1886–1894
- Preceded by: John Gray
- Succeeded by: Joseph St. John
- Constituency: York West

Personal details
- Born: March 8, 1855 Clarke Township, Durham County, Canada West
- Died: July 29, 1918 (aged 63)
- Party: Liberal
- Spouse(s): Emma Hawkins (1878–1886); Margaret Edgar (1889-)
- Children: 2
- Education: Trinity College, Toronto
- Profession: Doctor

John Taylor Gilmour (March 8, 1855 – July 29, 1918) was a Canadian physician, journalist and politician. He represented York West in the Legislative Assembly of Ontario from 1886 to 1894 as a Liberal member.

He was born in Clarke Township, Durham County, Canada West in 1855, the son of Thomas Gilmour. He studied in Port Hope and at Trinity College in Toronto, receiving an M.D. He set up practice in King Township, moving to Toronto Junction in 1884 where he served as surgeon for the Canadian Pacific Railway from 1885 to 1894. He established the Junction's first weekly newspaper, the York Tribune and served as its editor for two years. He also served as chairman of the high school board for Toronto Junction, and in this capacity was instrumental in the town acquiring its first high school which later became Humberside Collegiate Institute.

Following his stint in politics, Gilmour became active in prison reform, being named warden for the Central Prison at Toronto in 1896, a position he left to become Warden of the Ontario Reformatory at Guelph. At the time of his death he was the Ontario Parole Commissioner, and had the distinction of being the only Canadian prison official ever to serve as president of the American Prison Association (as Canada did not yet have its own prison association).

== Personal life ==
In 1878, Gilmour married Emma Hawkins with whom he had two children, including a son Charles who later became the Junction's coroner. Following her death in 1886, he married Margaret Edgar in 1889.

== Honours ==
When the Junction was annexed by Toronto in 1909, a street in the new ward was renamed "Gilmour Avenue" in his honour; it runs north–south from Maria Street to Woodside Avenue.
