= Henry Isaac Price =

Canadian politician from Ontario

Member of the Ontario Provincial Parliament for York West
- In office May 28, 1932 – April 3, 1934
- Preceded by: Forbes Godfrey
- Succeeded by: William James Gardhouse

Personal details
- Party: Conservative

Henry Isaac Price was a Canadian politician from the Conservative Party of Ontario. He represented York West in the Legislative Assembly of Ontario from 1932 to 1934.

== See also ==
- 18th Parliament of Ontario
