= Leslie Rowntree =

Canadian politician

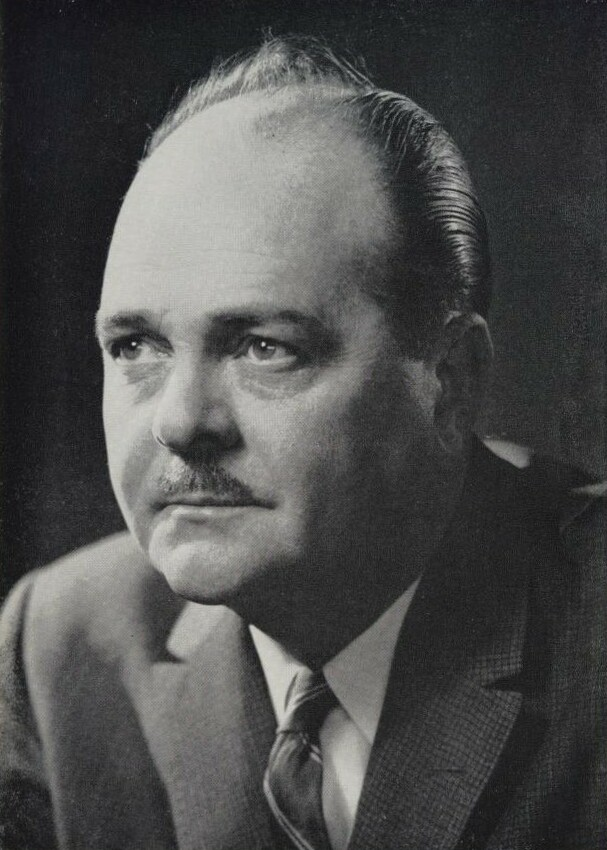
- Rowntree, c. 1950s

Ontario MPP
- In office 1956–1971
- Preceded by: Elmer Brandon
- Succeeded by: John MacBeth
- Constituency: York West

Personal details
- Born: Henry Leslie Rowntree; June 2, 1914 Toronto, Ontario
- Died: May 17, 1975 (aged 60) Honey Harbour, Ontario
- Party: Progressive Conservative
- Spouse: Cynthia Grierson
- Occupation: Lawyer

Military service
- Allegiance: Canada
- Branch/service: Royal Canadian Navy
- Years of service: 1942–45
- Rank: Lieutenant-Commander
- Battles/wars: Battle of the Atlantic

Henry Leslie Rowntree (June 2, 1914 – May 17, 1975) was a politician in Ontario, Canada. He was a Progressive Conservative member of the Legislative Assembly of Ontario from 1956 to 1971. He represented the riding of York West. He served as a cabinet minister in the governments of Leslie Frost and John Robarts.

== Background ==
Rowntree was born in Toronto, Ontario. He attended Runnymede Public School and Humberside Collegiate Institute. He graduated from University of Toronto and Osgoode Hall Law School. During his student days he worked summers on ships on the Great Lakes and spent a time as purser on the SS Noronic. In 1940, he enlisted in the Royal Canadian Navy and became a Lieutenant-Commander in the Royal Canadian Navy Volunteer Reserve. After the war he was called to the bar and eventually started his own law firm specializing in maritime law.

== Politics ==
Rowntree was elected in a by-election in 1956 to replace Elmer Brandon who had died while serving in office. He defeated CCF candidate Lynn Williams by 4,993 votes. He was re-elected in 1959, 1963 and 1967.

He was appointed to cabinet in 1960 as the Minister of Transport. He replaced John Yaremko who resigned due to an illness. He was named Minister of Labour in 1962 in a large cabinet shuffle. In 1966, he was appointed to the new position of Minister of Financial and Commercial Affairs.

In 1967, he announced major changes to the Ontario Securities Commission. The changes gave the OSC greater powers to investigate and audit financial corporations. The changes were brought about partly as a result of the collapse of Prudential Finance Corporation a year earlier.

In February 1969, during a session in the assembly, Rowntree rose to speak about an NDP opposition member's position on water pollution. After a saying a few words, opposition member Morton Shulman shouted "The minister is drunk!" The speaker ended the debate and Rowntree said little more. It was privately known that Rowntree was a heavy drinker but the incident, which was reported in the press, led to his removal from cabinet a year later and he retired from the legislature.

=== Cabinet positions ===
Robarts ministry, Province of Ontario (1961–1971)
Frost ministry, Province of Ontario (1949–1961)
Cabinet posts (3)
Predecessor	Office	Successor
New position	Minister of Financial and Commercial Affairs; 1966–1970	Bert Lawrence
Bill Warrender	Minister of Labour; 1962–1966	Dalton Bales
John Yaremko	Minister of Transport; 1960–1962	James Auld

== Later life ==
In 1970, he was appointed as Chairman of the Centennial Centre of Science and Technology. He died at Honey Harbour, Ontario in 1975 at the age of 60. His wife Cynthia died a year earlier in 1974.
