= John Everett Lyle Streight =

Canadian politician

Member of Parliament for York West
- In office 1935–1940
- Preceded by: James Lawson
- Succeeded by: Rodney Adamson

Personal details
- Born: August 15, 1880 Islington, Ontario, Canada
- Died: June 2, 1955 (aged 74)
- Party: Liberal
- Profession: Soldier

Colonel John Everett Lyle Streight MC (August 15, 1880 – June 2, 1955) was a Canadian lumber merchant, military officer and politician.

== Biography ==
Streight's was born and kept a home in Islington, Ontario (now part of Toronto) throughout his life. He joined the army at the age of 18, beginning a 46-year military career in which he was awarded the Military Cross. He fought in the South African War at the dawn of the 20th century and also saw action in World War I in which he was captured and became a prisoner of war.

In the 1930s he served as aide-de-camp to the Governor General of Canada and, in 1932, served as aide-de-camp to King George V.

Streight first ran for federal office in the 1921 federal election as a Liberal but was defeated in his York West by Henry Lumley Drayton. He was elected to the House of Commons of Canada on his second attempt, 14 years later, in the 1935 federal election winning by 60 votes. In 1937, he was a member of the Canadian contingent attending the coronation of King George VI. That year, he turned down an invitation from Adolf Hitler to speak to German youth on the need to establish an equivalent to the Canadian Legion. He retired from politics in 1940.
