= John Pearman Allan =

Canadian politician from Ontario

Member of the Ontario Provincial Parliament for York West
- In office June 4, 1945 – April 27, 1948
- Preceded by: Charles Millard
- Succeeded by: Charles Millard

Personal details
- Party: Progressive Conservative

John Pearman Allan was a Canadian politician who was Progressive Conservative MPP for York West from 1945 to 1948.

== See also ==
- 22nd Parliament of Ontario
