= Charles Millard =

Canadian politician (1896–1978)

Charlie Millard

Ontario MPP
- In office 1948–1951
- Preceded by: John Pearman Allan
- Succeeded by: Elmer Brandon
- Constituency: York West
- In office 1943–1945
- Preceded by: William Gardhouse
- Succeeded by: John Pearman Allan
- Constituency: York West

Personal details
- Born: August 25, 1896 St. Thomas, Ontario
- Died: November 24, 1978 (aged 82) Toronto, Ontario
- Party: CCF
- Profession: Trade unionist

Charles Hibbert (Charlie) Millard (August 25, 1896 – November 24, 1978) was a Canadian trade union activist and politician.

== Early life ==
He was born in St. Thomas, Ontario, the son of a railroad repairman, and first trained as a carpenter. Millard became an autoworker after his small business failed as a result of the Great Depression.

== Union activism ==
Employed by General Motors in Oshawa, Ontario, Millard was involved in the organizing auto workers in the 1930s and was elected the first president of the new United Auto Workers local 222 in Oshawa leading his union out on strike in 1937 after GM refused to recognize the union. The 18-day-long strike was successful and Millard's local obtained the first contract in Canada between an automobile manufacturer and its workers. Millard was elected the first Canadian director of the United Auto Workers, was a full-time organizer for the CIO and was also elected to the provincial executive of the Co-operative Commonwealth Federation in Ontario. Millard was active in championing the CCF within the union against the Communist Party of Canada, and was viewed as some as a divisive force.

In 1939, he was defeated in his bid for re-election as the UAW's Canadian director by George Burt who was the candidate of the "Unity Caucus" composed of Communists, left-wing CCFers and other militants who viewed Millard as right-wing.

CIO president John L. Lewis appointed Millard secretary of the CIO in Canada and then as the first head of the Steel Workers Organizing Committee in Canada (SWOC) became the United Steel Workers of America in 1942 with Millard as Canadian director and was active in purging Communists from the SWOC. Millard was also an executive member of the Canadian Congress of Labour and played a role in establishing the United Packinghouse Workers in Canada.

Millard stepped down as Canadian director in 1947 but resumed the post in the 1950s.

== World War II ==
Millard was initially critical of World War II - in December 1939 he was arrested under the Defence of Canada Regulations after telling workers in Timmins that "[we] should have democracy here in Canada before we go to Europe to defend it." As a result, Millard was jailed and the Canadian offices of the CIO being raided by the Royal Canadian Mounted Police.

== Creation of the Canadian Labour Congress ==
In the mid-1950s, Millard played a role in negotiating the merger of the Canadian Congress of Labour (CCL) with the rival Trades and Labour Congress of Canada becoming vice-president of the new body, the Canadian Labour Congress, at its founding in 1956. In the late 1950s he was also director of organizing for the International Confederation of Free Trade Unions in Brussels, Belgium.

== Political career ==
He served in the Legislative Assembly of Ontario as a CCF Member of Provincial Parliament for the Toronto area riding of York West from 1943 to 1945 and again from 1948 to 1951 and was also the party's vice president through much of the 1940s. In the early 1960s, he supported the creation of the New Democratic Party as a party with formal affiliation with the Canadian Labour Congress. He was a candidate for the federal CCF in the 1953 federal election and for the federal NDP in the 1962 and 1963 federal elections but failed in his bid to become a Member of Parliament in the House of Commons.

== Religious views ==
A Christian socialist, Millard was involved with the United Church of Canada and the Religious Labor Foundation.

== Death ==
He died in Toronto in 1978.

Preceded by none	Canadian Director of the United Auto Workers; 1937-1939	Succeeded by George Burt
