= George Burt (trade unionist) =

Canadian politician (1903–1988)

George Burt (17 August 1903 – 6 September 1988) was Canadian Director of the United Auto Workers (UAW/CAW) from 1939 to 1968.

His father was a brickmaker and active trade unionist. Burt worked as an apprentice plumber before getting a job on the General Motors assembly line in Oshawa, Ontario in 1929. Like many auto workers, his pay was so low that he was forced to go on welfare at times during the Great Depression. In 1937, the Congress of Industrial Organizations came to Canada to organize the Oshawa plant which went out on strike for 12 days in April forcing GM to recognize the union. Burt became treasurer of the newly formed UAW local 222. The local's president was Charles Millard who also served as Canadian director of the UAW. Millard was an anti-Communist and attempted to purge Communists and leftists from the union and promote the social democratic Co-operative Commonwealth Federation. A "unity caucus" of Communists, left wing CCFers and militants ran Burt as their candidate against Millard in 1939. Burt was elected Canadian director of the UAW and would remain in that position for almost thirty years. He would also serve as vice-president of the Canadian Congress of Labour and president of the Ontario Provincial Federation of Labour (1951–1953), a forerunner of the Ontario Federation of Labour.

Under Burt's leadership, the Canadian UAW organized Ford and Chrysler. Burt was arrested once in 1940 for allegedly interfering with war production when he participated in a picket across the street from Windsor's Chrysler plant.

In 1945, Burt was endorsed by both the Ontario Liberal Party and the Communist Labor-Progressive Party as one of a slate of three UAW "Liberal-Labour" candidates running in CCF held seats in Windsor in the Ontario provincial election but was defeated. It was not until December 1948 that the UAW fully endorsed the CCF.

According to labour historian Sam Gindin, Burt supported the left when it was the dominant faction in the late 1930s and 1940s but, during the Cold War, moved away from the Communists and became a supporter of moderate UAW leader Walter Reuther.

In 1961 he was a member of the New Democratic Party's founding committee.

== Legacy ==
Burt's work with the UAW is documented in The George Burt Papers at the Walter P. Reuther Library at Wayne State University. The collection contains council meeting minutes from 1940 to 1953 and Burt's council reports. In particular, the collection illustrates Burt's work during World War II.

== See also ==
- Canadian Auto Workers

Preceded by Charles Millard	Canadian Director of the United Auto Workers; 1939-1968	Succeeded by Dennis McDermott
