= John Borden Hamilton =

Canadian politician

John Borden Hamilton KC CM

Member of Parliament for York West
- In office 8 November 1954 – 17 June 1962
- Preceded by: Rodney Adamson
- Succeeded by: Red Kelly

Personal details
- Born: 16 May 1913 Barrie, Ontario, Canada
- Died: 24 November 2005 (aged 92) Toronto, Ontario, Canada
- Party: Progressive Conservative
- Profession: Lawyer

John Borden Hamilton KC CM (16 May 1913 – 24 November 2005) was a Canadian lawyer and Member of Parliament.

Born in Barrie, Ontario, he was first elected in a by-election in 1954 in the Toronto riding of York West as a Progressive Conservative. He was re-elected in 1957 and 1958. He lost to Red Kelly in 1962. From 1957 to 1958, he was the Parliamentary Assistant to the Minister of Citizenship and Immigration.

In 1992, he was made a Member of the Order of Canada. He is also a member of the Etobicoke Hall of Fame.
