= Earl Lawson (politician) =

Canadian politician

James Earl Lawson
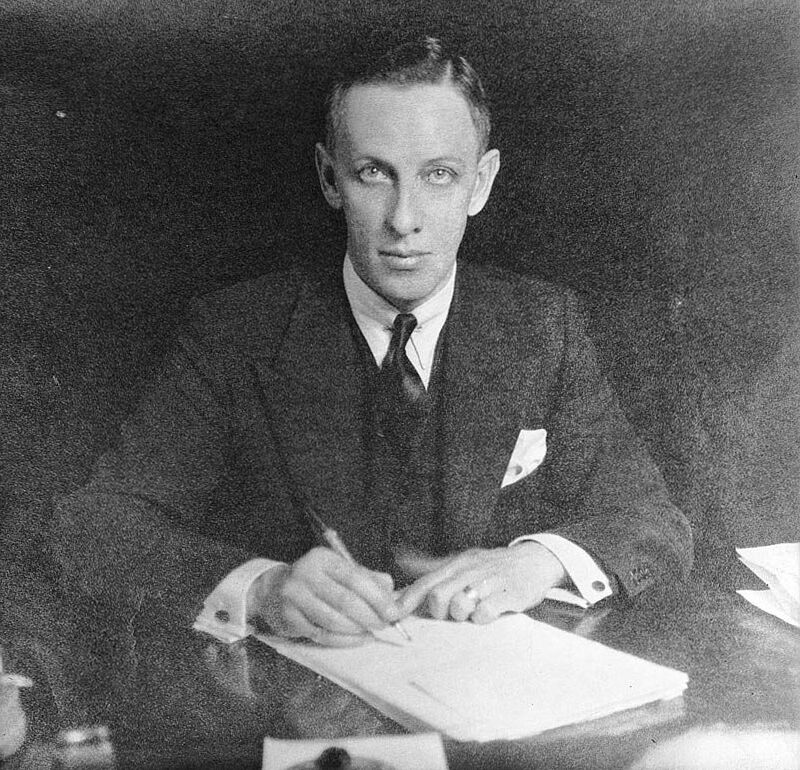

Member of Parliament for York South
- In office 1935–1940
- Preceded by: Robert McGregor
- Succeeded by: Alan Cockeram

Member of Parliament for York West
- In office 1928–1935
- Preceded by: Henry Drayton
- Succeeded by: John Streight

Personal details
- Born: October 21, 1891 Hamilton, Ontario
- Died: May 13, 1950 (aged 58)
- Party: Conservative
- Spouse: Anita Blanche Bateman
- Profession: Lawyer

James Earl Lawson, PC (October 21, 1891 – May 13, 1950) was a Canadian politician and lawyer.

Lawson was twice a candidate for the leadership of the Ontario Conservative Party, despite never being a member of the Legislative Assembly of Ontario, and once as a candidate for the federal Tory leadership.

His first run for the provincial leadership was in 1920 but was defeated by George Howard Ferguson.

He moved on to federal politics and was elected to the House of Commons of Canada as a Conservative MP in a 1928 by-election representing York West. Lawson was appointed to the cabinet of Prime Minister R.B. Bennett in August 1935 as Minister of National Revenue. He lost this position when the Conservatives were defeated in the fall 1935 election but he was elected to the House of Commons, this time representing York South.

Lawson was the "old guard" candidate at the 1938 Conservative leadership convention but placed last after many of his delegates decided to support M. A. MacPherson in an unsuccessful attempt to stop Robert James Manion from becoming leader.

In 1938, several months following his failed attempt to win the federal leadership, he placed second to George Drew at the Ontario party's provincial leadership convention.

Lawson retired from the House of Commons in 1940, but remained active in the party. He was the mover of the successful 1942 motion to change the name of the Conservative Party to the Progressive Conservative Party of Canada.

1930 Canadian federal election: York West
Party	Candidate	Votes	%	±%
Conservative	Earl Lawson	20,843	64.7	-13.2
Liberal	William Arthur Edwards	11,368	35.3	+13.2
Total valid votes		32,211	100.0	
Note: popular vote compared to vote in 1926 election.
Source: lop.parl.ca

By-election on October 29, 1928
Party	Candidate	Votes
Conservative	James Earl Lawson	Acc.
