= Humber River—Black Creek (provincial electoral district) =

Provincial electoral district in Ontario, Canada

Coordinates: 43.7569°N 79.5267°W

Ontario electoral district
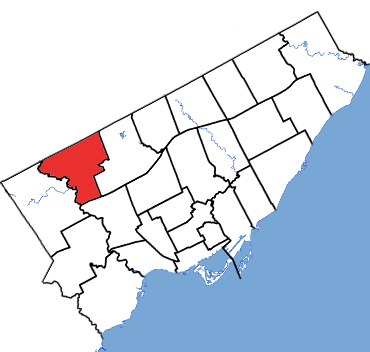
- Humber River-Black Creek in relation to the other Toronto ridings

Provincial electoral district
- Legislature: Legislative Assembly of Ontario
MPP
Tom Rakocevic
New Democratic
- District created: 1999
- First contested: 1999
- Last contested: 2025

Demographics
- Population (2016): 108,035
- Electors (2018): 66,289
- Area (km²): 31
- Pop. density (per km²): 3,485
- Census division: Toronto
- Census subdivision: Toronto

Humber River—Black Creek is a provincial electoral district in Ontario, Canada, that has been represented in the Legislative Assembly of Ontario since 1999. Prior to the 2018 election, the riding was known as York West.

Its population was 110,384 in 2001. The district includes the northwest corner of the former city of North York, including the extreme western part of the Downsview neighbourhood.

It consists of the part of the city of Toronto bounded on the north by the northern city limit, and on the east, south and west by a line drawn from the city limit south along Keele Street, west along Grandravine Drive, southeast along Black Creek, west along Sheppard Avenue West, south along Jane Street, west along Highway 401, and northwest along the Humber River to the northern city limit.

The riding is represented by Tom Rakocevic in the Legislative Assembly of Ontario.

== History ==
The provincial electoral district of Humber River—Black Creek came into existence at the 2018 provincial election, following the footsteps of its federal counterpart which came into existence at the 2015 federal election. In both cases, the new name was simply applied onto the former York West electoral districts with no change to their boundaries.

York West was one of the original electoral districts at Canadian Confederation, and it traced its origin even further, all the way to Upper Canada. While there was indeed a member of provincial parliament for York West from 1867 to 1987, their district has little connection to this electoral district beyond the former name. York West as a provincial electoral district was entirely situated in Etobicoke form the 1920s to the 1980s, therefore its MPPs during that time did not represent this neighbourhood at all.

The York West electoral district had been situated in the general area of Humber River—Black Creek provincially since 1999 and federally since the 1970s. Its last MPP Mario Sergio represented the area as MPP for York West from 1999 to 2018 and as MPP for Yorkview from 1995 to 1999. The Yorkview electoral district, in existence since 1963, was entirely within the boundary of the current Humber River—Black Creek, and is geographically a more genuine predecessor district.

After an hiatus between 1987 and 1999, York West was re-established in 1999 as a provincial electoral district for the area centre around Jane and Finch in the City of Toronto by the enactment of the Fewer Politicians Act, 1996, which prescribed the adoption of federal electoral boundary in the subsequent provincial election. It consists of parts of the old North York ridings of Yorkview and Downsview.

== Members of Provincial Parliament ==
Assembly	Years	Member	Party
York West re-created from Yorkview and Downsview
37th	1999–2003	Mario Sergio	Liberal
38th	2003–2007	Mario Sergio	Liberal
39th	2007–2011	Mario Sergio	Liberal
40th	2011–2014	Mario Sergio	Liberal
41st	2014–2018	Mario Sergio	Liberal
Rename; Humber River—Black Creek
42nd	2018–2022	Tom Rakocevic	New Democratic
43rd	2022–present	Tom Rakocevic	New Democratic

== Election results ==
=== 2018-present ===
2025 Ontario general election
Party	Candidate	Votes	%	±%	Expenditures
New Democratic	Tom Rakocevic	8,788	35.33	+0.84	$107,102
Progressive Conservative	Paul Nguyen	8,595	34.55	+4.80	$50,401
Liberal	Liban Hassan	6,811	27.38	–3.28	$84,963
Green	Alexander Qanbery	402	1.62	–0.25	$0
Communist	Jeanne McGuire	280	1.13	–	$0
Total valid votes/expense limit		24,876	98.70	–	$117,711
Total rejected, unmarked and declined ballots		328	1.30	–0.14	
Turnout		25,204	34.65	+1.50	
Eligible voters		72,740			
New Democratic hold		Swing		–1.98	
Source: Elections Ontario

Winning party in each polling division of Humber River—Black Creek
2022 Ontario general election

2025 Ontario general election

2022 Ontario general election
Party	Candidate	Votes	%	±%	Expenditures
New Democratic	Tom Rakocevic	7,959	34.49	–2.93	$92,545
Liberal	Ida Li Preti	7,076	30.66	+2.72	$64,439
Progressive Conservative	Paul Nguyen	6,865	29.75	–0.54	$63,667
Green	Keith Berry	430	1.86	+0.30	$1,068
Ontario Party	Lee Miguel Gonzalez	357	1.55	–	$4,264
New Blue	Iulian Caunei	281	1.22	–	$1,023
Independent	Knia Singh	110	0.48	–	$1,296
Total valid votes/expense limit		23,078	98.56	–	$98,948
Total rejected, unmarked and declined ballots		337	1.44	+0.17	
Turnout		23,415	33.15	–14.11	
Eligible voters		70,632			
New Democratic hold		Swing		▼2.83	
Source: Elections Ontario

2018 Ontario general election
Party	Candidate	Votes	%	±%
New Democratic	Tom Rakocevic	11,573	37.42	–1.80
Progressive Conservative	Cyma Musarat	9,367	30.29	+19.33
Liberal	Judy Sgro	8,642	27.94	–18.76
Green	Kirsten J. Bennett	485	1.57	–0.07
Libertarian	Jennifer Ochoa	344	1.11	–
Consensus Ontario	Scott Aitchison	320	1.03	–
Trillium	Lucy Guerrero	198	0.64	–
Total valid votes		30,929	98.73	
Total rejected, unmarked and declined ballots		397	1.27	–
Turnout		31,326	47.26	–
Eligible voters		66,289		
New Democratic notional gain from Liberal		Swing		+8.48
Source: Elections Ontario

=== York West, 1999-2018 ===
2014 Ontario general election: York West
Party	Candidate	Votes	%	±%
Liberal	Mario Sergio	11,907	46.71	–3.78
New Democratic	Tom Rakocevic	9,997	39.21	+4.39
Progressive Conservative	Karlene Nation	2,794	10.96	–1.10
Green	Keith Jarrett	418	1.64	+0.37
Freedom	Kayla Baptiste	267	1.05	+0.58
Independent	Wally Schwauss	111	0.44	–
Total valid votes		25,494	98.85	
Total rejected, unmarked and declined ballots		297	1.15	+0.41
Turnout		25,791	42.24	+3.01
Eligible voters		61,054		
Liberal hold		Swing		–4.09
Source: Elections Ontario

2011 Ontario general election: York West
Party	Candidate	Votes	%	±%
Liberal	Mario Sergio	11,455	50.49	–4.25
New Democratic	Tom Rakocevic	7,901	34.82	+6.87
Progressive Conservative	Karlene Nation	2,735	12.05	+1.79
Green	Joseph Rini	287	1.26	–3.69
Independent	Leland W. Cornell	114	0.50	–
Freedom	Kayla Baptiste	107	0.47	–
Independent	Scott Aitchison	89	0.39	–
Total valid votes		22,688	99.26	
Total rejected, unmarked and declined ballots		170	0.74	–0.89
Turnout		22,858	39.24	–5.21
Eligible voters		58,255		
Liberal hold		Swing		–5.56
Source: Elections Ontario

2007 Ontario general election: York West
Party	Candidate	Votes	%	±%
Liberal	Mario Sergio	13,246	54.74	–14.58
New Democratic	Antoni Shelton	6,764	27.95	+10.93
Progressive Conservative	Shane O'Toole	2,484	10.26	+0.23
Green	Sergio Pagnotta	1,199	4.95	+3.07
Family Coalition	Julia Carvalho	282	1.17	–
Independent	Ram Narula	225	0.93	–
Total valid votes		24,200	98.37	
Total rejected, unmarked and declined ballots		402	1.63	+0.51
Turnout		24,602	44.44	+0.49
Eligible voters		55,355		
Liberal hold		Swing		–12.75
Source: Elections Ontario

2003 Ontario general election: York West
Party	Candidate	Votes	%	±%
Liberal	Mario Sergio	16,102	69.31	+5.99
New Democratic	Garth Bobb	3,954	17.02	+4.03
Progressive Conservative	Ted Aver	2,330	10.03	–9.54
Green	Richard Von Fuchs	437	1.88	+0.24
Communist	Christopher Black	408	1.76	–
Total valid votes		23,231	98.88	
Total rejected, unmarked and declined ballots		264	1.12	–1.07
Turnout		23,495	43.95	–9.23
Eligible voters		53,454		
Liberal hold		Swing		+0.98
Source: Elections Ontario

1999 Ontario general election: York West
Party	Candidate	Votes	%	±%
Liberal	Mario Sergio	16,457	63.32	–
Progressive Conservative	Chris Collier	5,086	19.57	–
New Democratic	Stephanie Payne	3,377	12.99	–
Green	Anthony Davison	427	1.64	–
Natural Law	Mark Scrafford	299	1.15	–
Independent	S. Nicholas C. Lin	194	0.75	–
Independent	Rosemary Ann Ray	149	0.57	–
Total valid votes		25,989	97.81	
Total rejected, unmarked and declined ballots		582	2.19	+1.37
Turnout		26,571	53.19	–11.67
Eligible voters		49,959		
Liberal pickup new district.				
Source: Elections Ontario

== 2007 electoral reform referendum ==
2007 Ontario electoral reform referendum
Option	Votes	%
First Past the Post	12,010	54.4
Mixed member proportional	10,054	45.6
Total valid votes	22,064	100.0

== See also ==
- List of Ontario provincial electoral districts
- Canadian provincial electoral districts
