= Henry Lumley Drayton =

Canadian politician

The Honourable Sir Henry Lumley Drayton PC KC
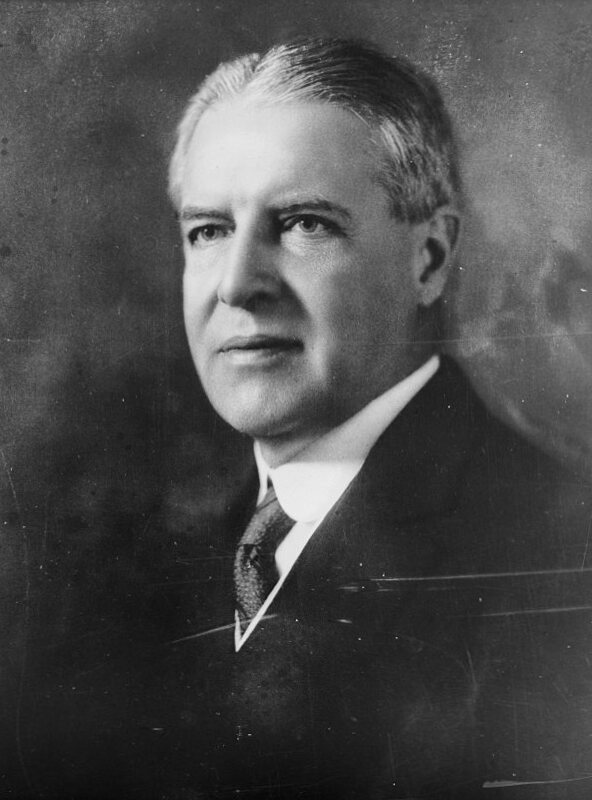
- Drayton, c. 1925

Minister of Finance and Receiver General
- In office 2 August 1919 – 28 December 1921
- Prime Minister: Arthur Meighen
- Preceded by: Arthur Sifton
- Succeeded by: Rodolphe Monty
- In office 29 June 1926 – 12 July 1926 (Acting)
- Prime Minister: Arthur Meighen
- Preceded by: James Robb
- Succeeded by: R.B. Bennett

Secretary of State for Canada (Acting)
- In office 24 January 1921 – 20 September 1921
- Prime Minister: Arthur Meighen
- Preceded by: Arthur Sifton
- Succeeded by: Rodolphe Monty

Minister of Railways and Canals (Acting)
- In office 29 June 1926 – 12 July 1926
- Prime Minister: Arthur Meighen
- Preceded by: Charles Avery Dunning
- Succeeded by: William Anderson Black (Acting)

Minister of Immigration and Colonization (Acting)
- In office 13 July 1926 – 24 September 1926
- Prime Minister: Arthur Meighen
- Preceded by: Robert James Manion (Acting)
- Succeeded by: Robert Forke

Minister Without Portfolio
- In office 13 July 1926 – 24 September 1926
- Prime Minister: Arthur Meighen

Member of the Canadian Parliament for Kingston
- In office 1919–1921
- Preceded by: William Nickle
- Succeeded by: Arthur Ross

Member of the Canadian Parliament for York West
- In office 1921–1928
- Preceded by: Tom Wallace
- Succeeded by: James Lawson

Personal details
- Born: 27 April 1869 Kingston, Ontario, Canada
- Died: 28 August 1950 (aged 81) Canada
- Party: Unionist; Conservative; Progressive Conservative
- Spouse: Edith Mary Cawthra
- Children: 3
- Profession: Lawyer, politician, and King's Counsel

Sir Henry Lumley Drayton PC KC (27 April 1869 – 28 August 1950) was a Canadian lawyer and politician.

== Early life ==
Born in Kingston, Ontario, the son of Philip Henry Drayton, who came to Canada with the 16th Rifles of England, and Margaret S. Covernton, Drayton was educated in schools in both England and Canada. He was called to the Ontario Bar in 1891 and was created a King's Counsel in 1908.

== Legal career ==
From 1893 to 1900, Drayton was an Assistant City Solicitor for Toronto. In 1900, he formed a partnership with Charles J. Holman. In 1902, he was appointed Counsel to the Railway Committee of the Ontario Legislature. From 1904 to 1909, he was a County Crown Attorney for the County of York. In 1910, he was appointed Counsel for the Corporation of the City of Toronto. In 1911, he was appointed to the Toronto Power Commission. In 1912, he was appointed Chief Commissioner of the Board of Railway Commissioners for Canada.

== Political career ==
Drayton was first elected to the House of Commons of Canada from Kingston in a 1919 by-election as a Conservative Party candidate. He served as Minister of Finance under both Sir Robert Borden and Arthur Meighen until the Conservative Party's defeat in the 1921 general election. Drayton kept his seat in that election.

In 1927, he was a candidate the leadership of the Conservative Party, but finished in last place. Drayton retired from politics in 1928 to become chairman of the Liquor Control Board of Ontario.

He attempted to return to Parliament in the 1945 election from a seat in Victoria, British Columbia, but lost narrowly to the Liberal candidate.

== Personal life and death ==
He was conferred a knighthood as a Knight Bachelor, which carries no postnominal letters, but carried the title 'Sir' before his name though.

Drayton married Edith Mary Cawthra and had three daughters. He died on 28 August 1950, at the age of 81.

== Electoral history ==
1945 Canadian federal election: Victoria
Party	Candidate	Votes	%	±%
Liberal	Robert Mayhew	11,806	33.32	-19.15
Progressive Conservative	Henry Lumley Drayton	11,442	32.30	-2.48
Co-operative Commonwealth	Murray D. Bryce	10,295	29.06	+16.38
Communist	Garry Culhane	1,093	3.09	–
Social Credit	William Franklin Lougheed	793	2.24	–
Total valid votes		35,429	100.0	
Liberal hold		Swing		-8.34

1926 Canadian federal election: York West
Party	Candidate	Votes	%	±%
Conservative	Henry Lumley Drayton	16,479	77.9	+2.1
Liberal	Alfred Taylour Hunter	4,681	22.1	-2.1
Total valid votes		21,160	100.0	

1925 Canadian federal election: York West
Party	Candidate	Votes	%	±%
Conservative	Henry Lumley Drayton	23,637	75.8	+30.6
Liberal	Alexander MacGregor	7,536	24.2	-16.7
Total valid votes		31,173	100.0	

1921 Canadian federal election: York West
Party	Candidate	Votes	%	±%
Conservative	Henry Lumley Drayton	8,850	45.3	-35.4
Liberal	J.E.L. Streight	7,989	40.9	+21.6
Progressive	James Alexander Cameron	2,710	13.9	
Total valid votes		19,549	100.0	

By-election on 20 October 1919 On William Folger Nickle's resignation, 7 July 1919
Party	Candidate	Votes
Government (Unionist)	Henry Lumley Drayton	acclaimed
