= Nam Nguyen (playwright) =

Vietnamese Canadian playwright (born 1997)

Nam Nguyen (born August 1997) is a Vietnamese Canadian actor, playwright, and Jeopardy! champion. He has written numerous plays and musicals, most notably A Perfect Bowl of Pho, that cover the Asian American diaspora. Nguyen's works have been performed at theatre festivals across Ontario, most notably at the Toronto Fringe Festival and the Summerworks Performance Festival.

== Selected works ==
- A Perfect Bowl of Pho
- Caezus
- Mapleman Canuck Crusader
- Red Tide
- TWEP
