= Jane-Finch.com =

News website about a Toronto community

- Screenshot of Jane-Finch.com in 2006
- Website type: hyperlocal, news, community journalism
- Available in: English
- Owner: Paul Nguyen
- Creator: Paul Nguyen
- Website: jane-finch.com
- Launched: 2004; 22 years ago
- Current status: Active

Jane-Finch.com is a hyperlocal news website about the Jane and Finch community in Toronto, Canada.

== History ==
Jane-Finch.com was launched on March 13, 2004, by Paul Nguyen. It began as a rap and hip hop site and later evolved to promoting social issues in the area. In the process of building the website, Nguyen was helped out by his friend, Mark Simms. It eventually led to the production of a documentary Lost in the Struggle.

The website produces videos and articles with residents to give a look inside the community. Jane-Finch.com shares positive news stories and current news about the area.

== Reception ==
Jane-Finch.com attracted local and national media attention.

=== Awards ===
In 2010, Jane-Finch.com won a Canadian Ethnic Media Association Award in the Internet Category for its community journalism. A year later, the website received a Heritage Toronto Award for "promoting and conserving aspects of Toronto's cultural history".
