= Avvy Go =

Canadian lawyer (born 1963)

Honourable Avvy Yao-Yao Go OOnt
- Born: 1963 (age 62–63); Hong Kong
- Occupations: Lawyer, activist
- Awards: Order of Ontario

Chinese name
- Traditional Chinese: 吳瑤瑤
- Simplified Chinese: 吴瑶瑶
Transcriptions

Avvy Yao-Yao Go OOnt (born 1963, in Hong Kong) is a Canadian lawyer who have been serving as a judge of the Federal Court since August 2021. She is the first Chinese Canadian to be appointed to the Federal Court. Prior to her judicial appointment, she was a prominent lawyer in Toronto for her advocacy for immigrant and racialized communities in Canada and for her role in calling out systemic racism and other forms of discrimination within the legal system.

== Early life and education ==
Go was born in 1963 in Hong Kong and emigrated to Canada with her parents in 1982.

Go completed her undergraduate studies in economics at the University of Waterloo in 1986, and obtained her law degree from the University of Toronto Faculty of Law in 1989. She completed her articles with Toronto-based law firm WeirFoulds, and was called to the Bar in Ontario in 1991. She further obtained her master of laws degree from Osgoode Hall Law School in 1999.

== Career as an activist lawyer ==
Go commenced her formal legal career at Women's Legal Education and Action Fund (LEAF) as a legal researcher.

Go worked as a legal clinic lawyer for close to three decades. She joined Legal Aid Ontario's legal clinic system as a staff lawyer in Toronto, initially at the East Toronto Community Legal Services and Parkdale Community Legal Services.

=== Advocacy for immigrants and racialized community ===
In 1992, Go began her leadership of the Metro Toronto Chinese & Southeast Asian Legal Clinic, a clinic with a specific focus on servicing low-income non-English speakers in the Chinese, Vietnamese, Cambodian, and Laotian communities in the Greater Toronto Area. During her tenure, Go was frequently cited sought by the press for comments on legal issues relating to systemic racism and the racialization of poverty, and was a leading voice on historic injustice suffered by the Chinese Canadian community.

In 2002, Go was co-counsel in a class action lawsuit, Mack v Canada (AG), on behalf of Chinese head tax payers and their descendants against the Government of Canada to seek redress for the harmful effect of discriminatory Chinese head tax and Chinese Exclusion Act. Although the litigation was ultimately unsuccessful, it increased political pressure on the government to address this issue and help lead to an official apology by the Prime Minister of Canada on June 22, 2006, and the payment of symbolic reparations for survivors and their spouses.

In 2007, she co-founded the Colour of Poverty Campaign (COPC), a campaign to address the increasing racialization of poverty in Ontario and currently serves as a steering committee member of COPC. She continued to serve in the organization, was a member of the steering committee in 2017.

In 2017, Go appeared before a Canadian Senate hearing to discuss the impact of high fees on immigration for the at risk communities she serves in her role at Metro Toronto Chinese & Southeast Asian Legal Clinic.

Go was involved in a case involving a Chinese couple who had their rights as parents challenged because their DNA did not match the DNA of their child.

=== Campaign for Chinese head tax reparations ===
Go was a leading voice in the campaign to redress the historical wrong from Chinese Head Tax and the Chinese Immigration Act of 1923 for over a decade. She was thrust to the frontline of the campaign when she became the acting executive director of the Chinese Canadian National Council (CCNC) in 1988 and the president of its Toronto chapter in 1989.

=== Service to the legal profession ===
Go was elected as a Bencher of Law Society of Upper Canada in 2001, 2006, and again in 2013.

== Judiciary ==
On August 6, 2021, Go was appointed a justice of the Federal Court and an ex officio member of the Federal Court of Appeal by Minister of Justice and Attorney General David Lametti. This made her the first Chinese Canadian to be appointed to the Federal Court. She was the fifteenth judge appointed to the Federal Court by the Liberal Trudeau ministry.

She would face mandatory retirement in 2038.

== Awards and honours ==
- President's Award, 2002, Women's Law Association of Ontario
- William P. Hubbard Race Relations Award, 2008, City of Toronto
- Lawyer of Distinction Award, 2012, Federation of Asian Canadian Lawyers
- Member, 2014, Order of Ontario, with the following citation:

Avvy Yao Yao Go is a respected lawyer, who uses her law degree to advance the rights of Toronto's marginalized communities. She has built coalitions across different communities on issues of anti-racism, human rights and equity and most recently co-founded the "Colour of Poverty Campaign".

- Doctor of Laws Honoris Causa, Toronto Metropolitan University (2022)
- Alumni Achievement Award recipient for Professional Achievement, University of Waterloo (2025)
- Honorary LLD, 2026, Law Society of Ontario
