= Vietnamese Canadians in the Greater Toronto Area =

Toronto has a significant population of Vietnamese Canadians. Toronto is about 1.5% Vietnamese.

== History ==
Vietnamese students began attending universities in Toronto in the 1950s and 1960s. Some Vietnamese professionals settled in Toronto prior to 1975. In 1972 the first Vietnamese association in Toronto was founded. The Fall of Saigon in 1975 resulted in the first wave of Toronto's Vietnamese refugees. Between 1979 and 1982 12,000 persons fleeing Vietnam arrived in Toronto, and the city's Vietnamese population, including both Kinh people and Vietnamese Chinese, was about 30,000 by 1986.

By 1989 the Greater Toronto Area had Canada's largest concentration of Vietnamese people, at over 50,000.

By 2016 the population of Vietnamese in the Greater Toronto Area was 73,749 out of 5,928,040 which represents approximately 1.2%.

== Demographics ==
The 1986 Canadian census stated that there were 7,490 Toronto residents who stated they spoke Vietnamese as their native language. The 1991 Canadian census listed 24,555 persons of Vietnamese origin in Toronto. Janet McLellan, the author of Many Petals of the Lotus: Five Asian Buddhist Communities in Toronto, stated that the census undercounted Toronto's Vietnamese population.

Jane and Finch in North York has a significant Vietnamese community, about 10% of its population is of Vietnamese descent.

== Institutions ==
The Kinh people have formed various associations in Toronto. The associations manage the Canadian Vietnamese identity, offer mutual aid, mediate between community members, and to officially represent the Vietnamese community. In Toronto usually Viet Hoa (Vietnamese Chinese) formed separate associations from the Kinh people.

Kinh associations include Elderly Vietnamese Association, the Greater Toronto Vietnamese Refugee Assistance Committee, the National United Front for the Liberation of Vietnam, the Veterans Association, Vietnamese Association, Vietnamese Canadian Parents' Association, Vietnamese Student Society, and Vietnamese Women's Association.

By 2006, in order to serve the growing Vietnamese community in Downtown Toronto, several existing neighbourhood groups and settlement groups had added Vietnamese employees.

== Media ==
Several Vietnamese magazines are published in Toronto.

== Economy ==
From 1981 to 2010 over 60 specialty stores, cafes, and restaurants that were owned by Vietnamese people had opened in Toronto. Other businesses include real estate agencies, printing shops, auto collision companies, and jewelry stores.

== Religion ==
Buddhism and Christianity the primary religions of Toronto's Vietnamese community. The Thien Tinh Tao Trang or the Thao-Duong School is the Buddhist school of the Vietnamese temples. The Vietnamese Buddhist Temple has worshipers from Kinh and Chinese Vietnamese origins. Toronto is a common stop for Vietnamese monks doing tours in North America.

In 1976 Chan Nhu, the first Vietnamese Buddhist group in Toronto, opened. By 1992 the Vietnamese Zen Meditation Group, a Vietnamese Buddhist Association, had been founded, and there were four Vietnamese Buddhist temples opened: Amida, Hao Nghiem, Linh-Son, and Van Duc. In a five-year span additional temples were founded.

== Recreation ==
The Vietnamese New Year is celebrated in Toronto.

The Vietnamese community has Pham Ngoc Thuan and other folk dance groups.

== Notable residents ==
- Chuckie Akenz, rapper
- Chi Nguyen, member of parliament.
- Paul Nguyen, film director, activist
- Jennifer Pan - Criminal, of Viet Hoa (ethnic Chinese in Vietnam) ancestry
