= Ngan (disambiguation) =

Ngan or Ngân may refer to:

- Ngan, a Thai unit of area, equal to 400 square metres

== Surname ==
- Yan (surname 顏), spelled Ngan based on its Cantonese pronunciation
  - Cherry Ngan (born 1993), Hong Kong singer, actress and model
  - Guy Ngan (1926–2017), New Zealand artist; media include sculpture, painting, drawing, design and architecture
  - Johnny Ngan (born 1949), Hong Kong film actor and television actor
  - Kevin Ngan (born 1983), fencer from Hong Kong, China who won a bronze medal at the 2006 Asian Games in the men's foil team competition

== Given name ==
- Ngoc Bich Ngan (born 1973), Vietnamese-Canadian singer, songwriter, artist and writer
- Nguyễn Ngọc Ngạn (born 1945), Vietnamese-Canadian writer and essayist
- Phạm Thanh Ngân (born 1939), former Mikoyan-Gurevich MiG-21 pilot of the Vietnamese People's Air Force
- Phan Thu Ngân (born 1980), crowned the 7th Miss Vietnam in 2000
