= Jane and Finch =

Jane and Finch Elia University Heights
- Neighbourhood
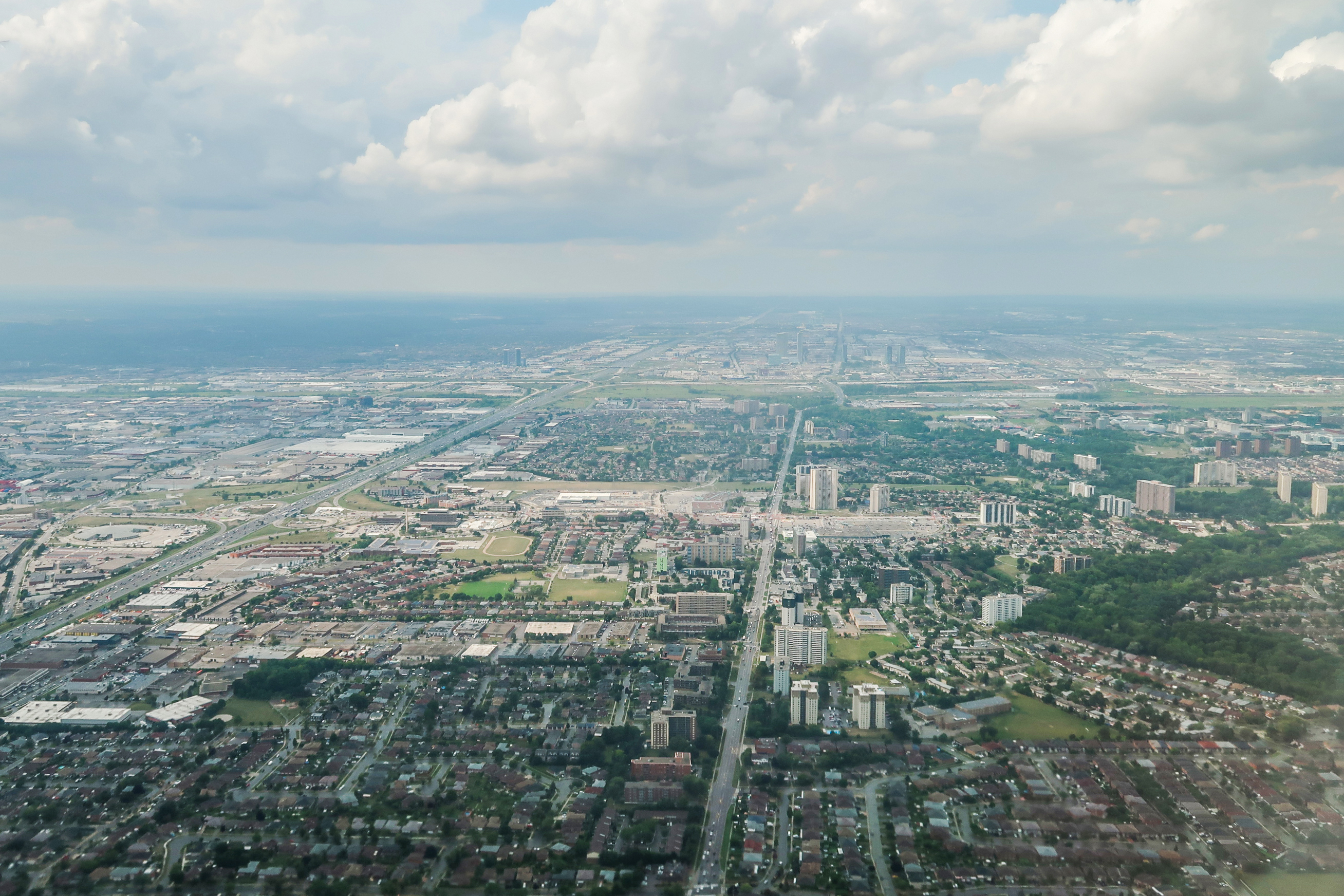
- Aerial view of Jane and Finch (2021)

- Location within Toronto
- Coordinates: 43°45′26″N 79°31′4″W
- Country: Canada
- Province: Ontario
- City: Toronto
- Municipality established: 1850 York Township
- Changed municipality: 1922 North York from York Township; 1998 Toronto from North York

Population (2021)
  - Total: 51,170
  - Density: 6,073/km^{2} (15,730/sq mi)

Jane and Finch is a neighbourhood located in the northwest end of Toronto, Ontario, Canada, in the district of North York. Centred at the intersection of Jane Street and Finch Avenue West, the area is roughly bounded by Highway 400 to the west, Black Creek to the east, Sheppard Avenue to the south, and Steeles Avenue to the north. Two city neighbourhoods cover the area commonly known as Jane and Finch. From Finch north to Steeles is considered part of the Black Creek community while from Finch south to Sheppard is called Glenfield-Jane Heights.

The Jane and Finch community is a high density and low-income neighbourhood. It is made up of single-family detached and semi-detached houses, along with several high-rise apartment buildings, with a mix of residential and commercial developments.

== History ==
The earliest known human habitation in the area shows that the area was occupied by the Haudenosaunee people during the fifteenth century. The Parsons Site, located near Black Creek, contained the remains of a large Iroquoian village containing at least ten longhouses, palisades, middens, and a burial site. The site is regarded as one of the most significant archaeological discoveries in Toronto, documenting a sizeable Indigenous presence in the Jane and Finch area prior to European colonization. Jane-Finch later became known as Ellia following European settlement.

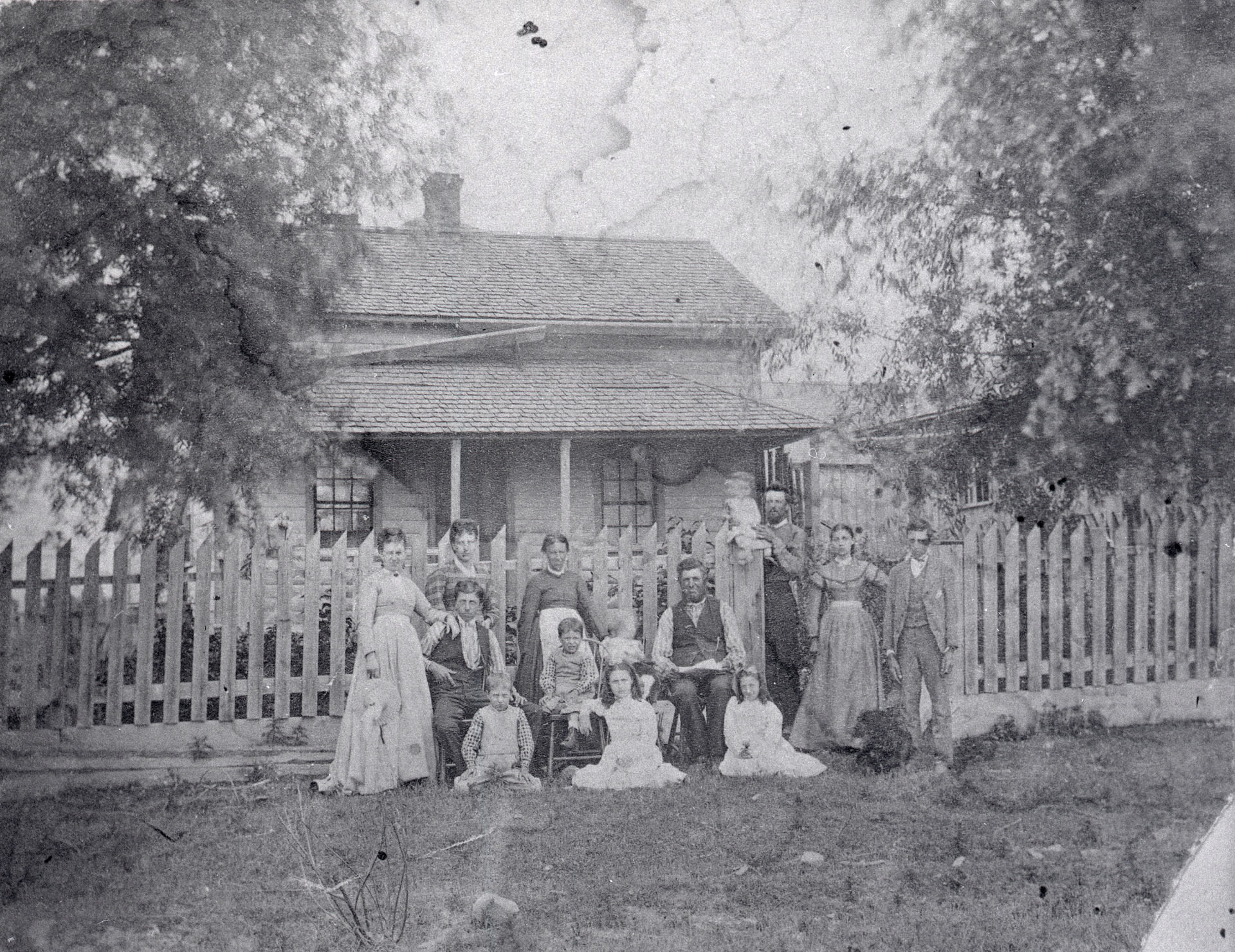
The Joseph Crossan House in Elia, on the northwest corner of present-day Jane St. and Finch Ave. in 1878.

The 1960s development plans spearheaded by the Ontario Housing Corporation (OHC) coincided with North York Planning Department's goal of creating a more urban-looking suburb. Known for its series of high-rise buildings and, concomitantly, its above average population density, Jane-Finch experienced astronomical growth from 1961 to 1971 when the population went from 1,300 to 33,000, thereby accounting for more than 40% of the growth in North York.

By 1967, 22.5% of all residential dwellings in the Jane and Finch neighbourhood were designated public housing. Meanwhile, just 3% of North York was designated public housing at the same time. Throughout the 1960s, many of the private and public housing buildings were constructed in the modern architectural style.

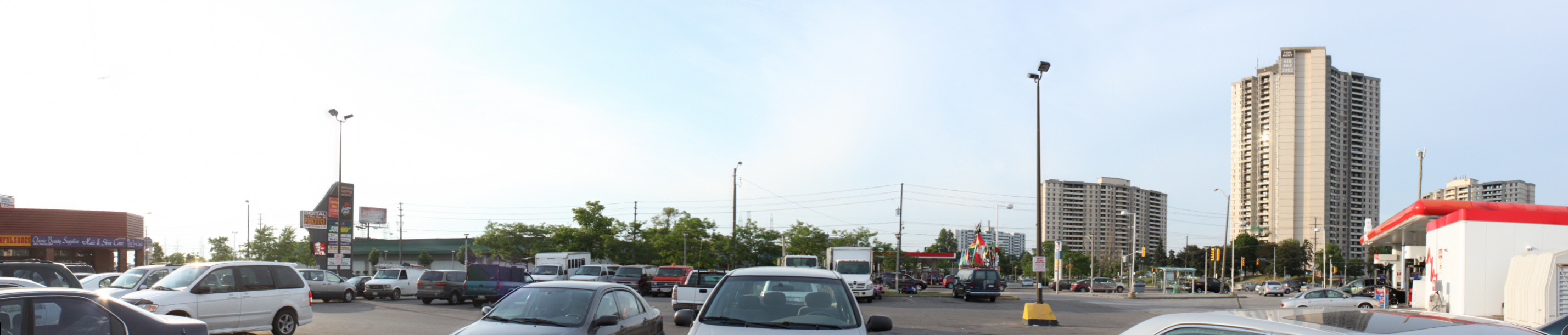
Throughout the 1960s, a number of buildings in the neighbourhood were built in a modern architectural style.

In 1973, a group of dedicated residents, politicians and community workers started identifying ways to address community problems. They concentrated their efforts on improving their neighbourhood's negative image and creating a sense of community pride. Since then the neighbourhood has developed over 30 grassroots associations, including social and health service organizations, based on principles of mutual aid. Jane-Finch residents managed to create the infrastructure that their community needed to become healthy and sustainable. They succeeded in bringing together various sectors to address a wide range of economic, social and recreational needs. Still, a 1975 study by a planning consulting firm identified the following problems resulting from the rapid growth of the community: overcrowded schools, disconnected social services, inadequate recreation facilities, and a serious issue with youth crime.

In 1983 Jennifer Hodge de Silva, a pioneering filmmaker of the 1970s and 1980s produced the film, Home Feeling: Struggle for a Community which revealed tensions between police and area residents.

Between 1981 and 2001, the total population of North York grew by 8.7%; higher economic families by 9%, but poor economic families by 80.5%. Poverty intensified in 5 main areas. The most prominent is the Jane-Finch area, where four poor neighbourhoods turned into regions of very high poverty, and a region that previously had low to moderate poverty became classified as having high levels of poverty. By 2001, a major shift had taken place, with the immigrant family population now accounting for 62.4% of the total family population in these communities, and Canadian born families making up the remaining 37.6%. Between 1981 and 2001, the number of racialized individuals also increased by 219%.

=== 21st century ===
By 2002, the area had "one of the highest proportions of youth, sole-supported families, refugees and immigrants, low-income earners and public housing tenants of any community in Toronto". That year, only 70% of people in the neighbourhood had proper indoor plumbing (compared to 95% of Canadians), and brownouts were common. Over half of the neighbourhood's residents lived below the poverty line. The United Way's "Poverty by Postal Code-The Geography of Neighbourhood Poverty: 1981–2001" also highlighted poverty in the city.

The area still grapples with youth crime, with the highest youth crime risk index score of any Toronto neighbourhood, and elevated crime rates. The Canadian government funded a youth program known as Positive Alternatives to Youth Gangs (PAYG) in the neighbourhood. The Toronto City Summit Alliance's Strong Neighbourhoods Task Force identified the Black Creek Neighbourhood as one of the 13 Priority Neighbourhoods across the city, where there are not enough social services to address the growing needs of the community. Jane-Finch was one of three Toronto neighbourhoods to address community safety through the Prevention and Intervention Toronto (PIT) program funded by the National Crime Prevention Centre, focuses on youth between the ages of 13 and 24 that are already involved in gangs or at risk of becoming so.

As part of a rebranding strategy in 2008, Toronto City Councillor Anthony Perruzza had banners attached to hundreds of hydro poles in Jane and Finch, calling the area University Heights, due to its proximity to York University, and referencing the existing name of the neighbourhood in municipal planning documents.

In December 2017, an extension of the western branch of the Line 1 Yonge-University subway line was opened, with a station; Finch West, at Keele Street, about 1.5 km east of the neighbourhood. On December 7, 2025 Line 6 Finch West opened along Finch Avenue connecting the neighbourhood to Line 1 at Keele Street to the east and Humber Polytechnic to the west.

Major police raids targeting the neighbourhood's gangs have occurred in 2007, 2011 and 2017. According to Toronto's police chief, area gangs "have infiltrated various communities" across the province and beyond.

== Demographics ==
Historical populations
Year	Pop.	±%
1961	1,300	—
1971	33,000	+2438.5%
1996	59,495	+80.3%
2001	58,055	−2.4%
2006	52,595	−9.4%
2011	53,447	+1.6%
2016	52,228	−2.3%
2021	51,170	−2.0%

The population of Jane and Finch has generally been in decline since the 1996 census.

Median Household Income	2001	2006	2011	2016
North Jane & Finch (Black Creek)	$37,081	$39,755	$39,986	$46,580
South Jane & Finch (Glenfield-Jane Heights)	$41,361	$44,208	$44,488	$51,964
City of Toronto	$49,345	$52,554	$58,381	$65,829

=== North Jane & Finch (Black Creek) ===
As of 2021, the northern half of the neighbourhood had a population of 21,145.

Major ethnic populations (2021):

- 30.9% Black; 5.6% Jamaican
- 15.6% European; 5.6% Italian
- 12.8% Southeast Asian; 9.4% Vietnamese
- 9.5% South Asian; 4.4% East Indian
- 7.8% Latin American (of any race)

=== South Jane & Finch (Glenfield-Jane Heights) ===
As of 2021, the southern half of the neighbourhood had a population of 30,025.

Major ethnic populations (2021):

- 23.3% Black; 5.7% Jamaican
- 21.4% European; 12.7% Italian
- 16.2% Southeast Asian; 13.8% Vietnamese
- 10.8% Latin American (of any race)
- 6.8% South Asian; 3.7% East Indian

== Education ==
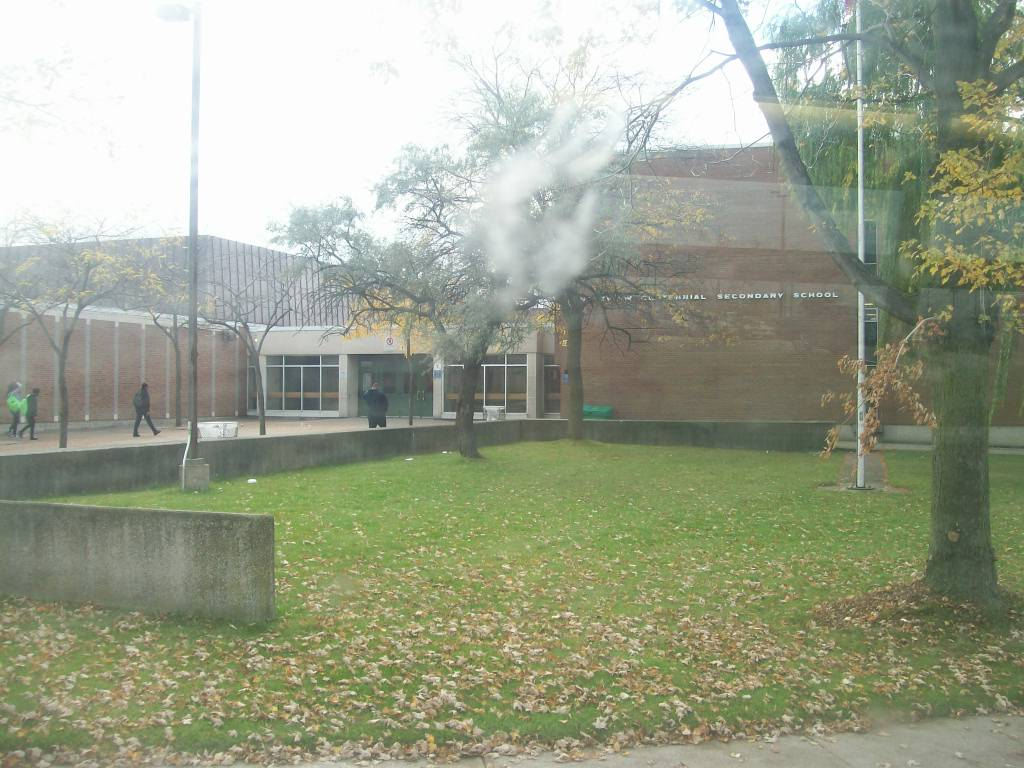
Westview Centennial Secondary School is a secondary school located in Jane and Finch.

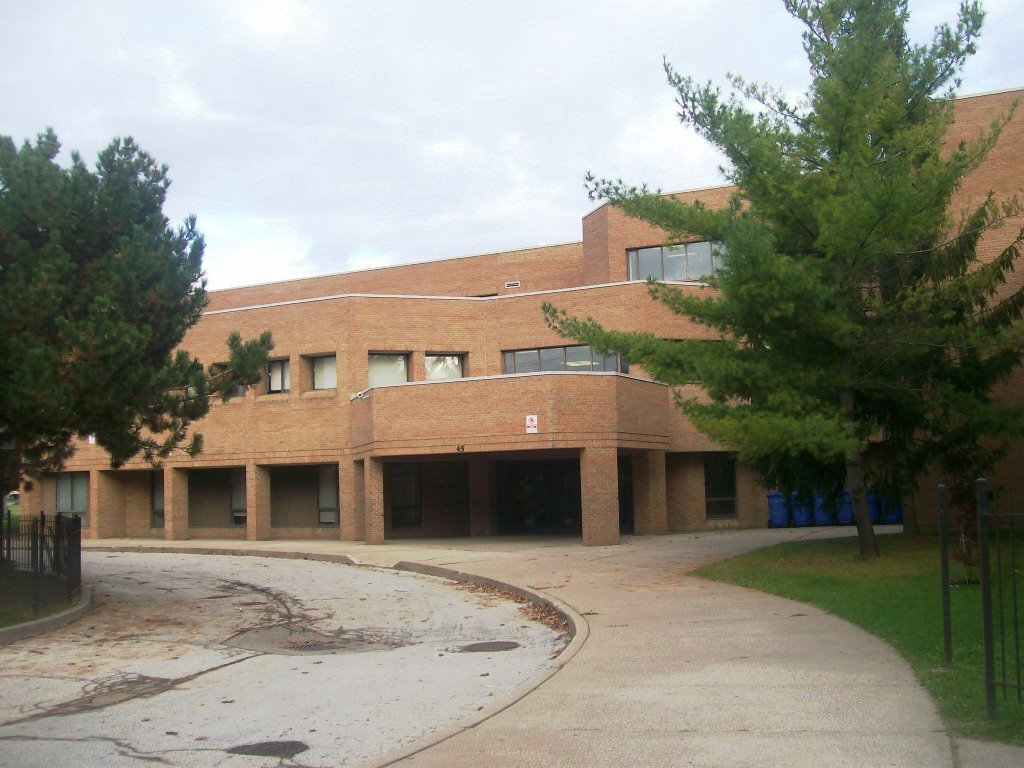
Regina Pacis Catholic Secondary School is a defunct Roman Catholic secondary school located in Jane and Finch. The building has been occupied by Monsignor Fraser College.

Two public school boards operate schools in Jane and Finch, the separate Toronto Catholic District School Board (TCDSB), and the secular Toronto District School Board (TDSB). Before 1998, they were overseen by the Metropolitan Separate School Board (MSSB) and North York Board of Education (NYBE) respectively. Both TCDSB, and TDSB operate public primary education institutions in the neighbourhood, including:

- Blacksmith Public School (TDSB)
- Blessed Margherita of Cittá di Castello School (TCDSB)
- Brookview Middle School (TDSB)
- Gosford Public School (TDSB)
- Driftwood Public School (TDSB)
- Firgrove Public School (TDSB)
- Oakdale Park Middle School (TDSB)
- Shoreham Public Sports and Wellness Academy (formerly known as Shoreham Public School) (TDSB)
- St. Charles Garnier Catholic School (TCDSB)
- St. Francis De Sales Catholic School (TCDSB)
- St. Jane Frances Catholic School (TCDSB)
- Stanley Public School (TDSB)
- Topcliff Public School (TDSB)
- Yorkwoods Public School (TDSB)

In addition to public primary education institutions, TDSB also operate two public secondary schools, Westview Centennial Secondary School and C. W. Jefferys Collegiate Institute.

TCDSB currently does not operate a regular secondary school in the neighbourhood as of 2026, with TCDSB secondary school students residing in Jane and Finch attending institutions in adjacent neighbourhoods. However, the board previously operated Regina Pacis Catholic Secondary School, opened in 1980 until its closure in 2002. The building has been occupied by Monsignor Fraser College's Norfinch Campus is also situated in the neighbourhood. Monsignor Fraser College is a secondary education institution operated by TCDSB as a specialized dual-track alternative and adult secondary school.

The French first language public secular school board, Conseil scolaire Viamonde, and it separate counterpart, Conseil scolaire catholique MonAvenir also offer schooling to applicable residents of Jane and Finch, although they do not operate a school in the neighbourhood. CSCM and CSV students attend schools situated in other neighbourhoods in Toronto.

== Recreation ==
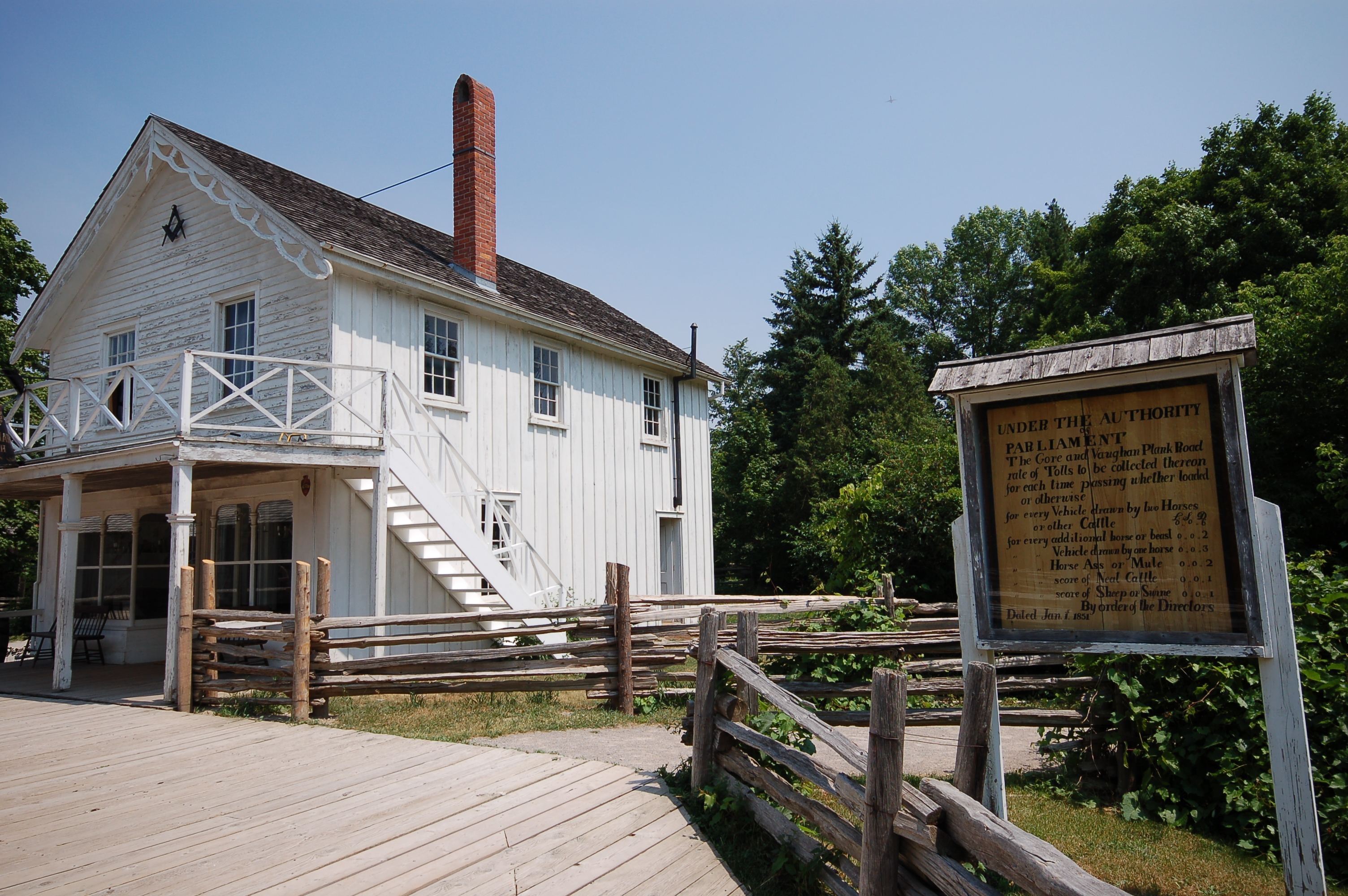
Tinsmith Shop at Black Creek Pioneer Village, an open-air heritage museum of 19th-century Ontario.

Several municipal parks are situated in Jane and Finch, including Fennimore Park, Driftwood Park, Edgeley Park, Hullmar Park, Oakdale Park, Remberto Navia Sports Field, Silvio Colella Park, and Topcliff Park. Several municipal parks are situated near the Black Creek, a tributary of the Humber River. The Black Creek, and its valleys, forms a part of the larger Toronto ravine system. Municipal parks in Jane and Finch are maintained by the Toronto Parks, Forestry and Recreation Division. The division also operates several community centres in the neighbourhood, including Driftwood Community Centre, Domenico DiLuca Community Recreation Centre, Northwood Community Centre, Oakdale Community Centre.

The Oakdale Golf & Country Club is a private, parkland-style golf and tennis club located in the neighborhood; Black Creek runs through the course. It hosted the 2023 Canadian Open, and will host the tournament again in 2026.

Two branches of the Toronto Public Library also operate from the neighbourhood, York Woods branch, and Jane/Sheppard branch.

Black Creek Pioneer Village, located in the northeast of the neighbourhood next to Black Creek, is an open-air museum of 19th-century Ontario life.

== Transportation ==
=== Roads ===
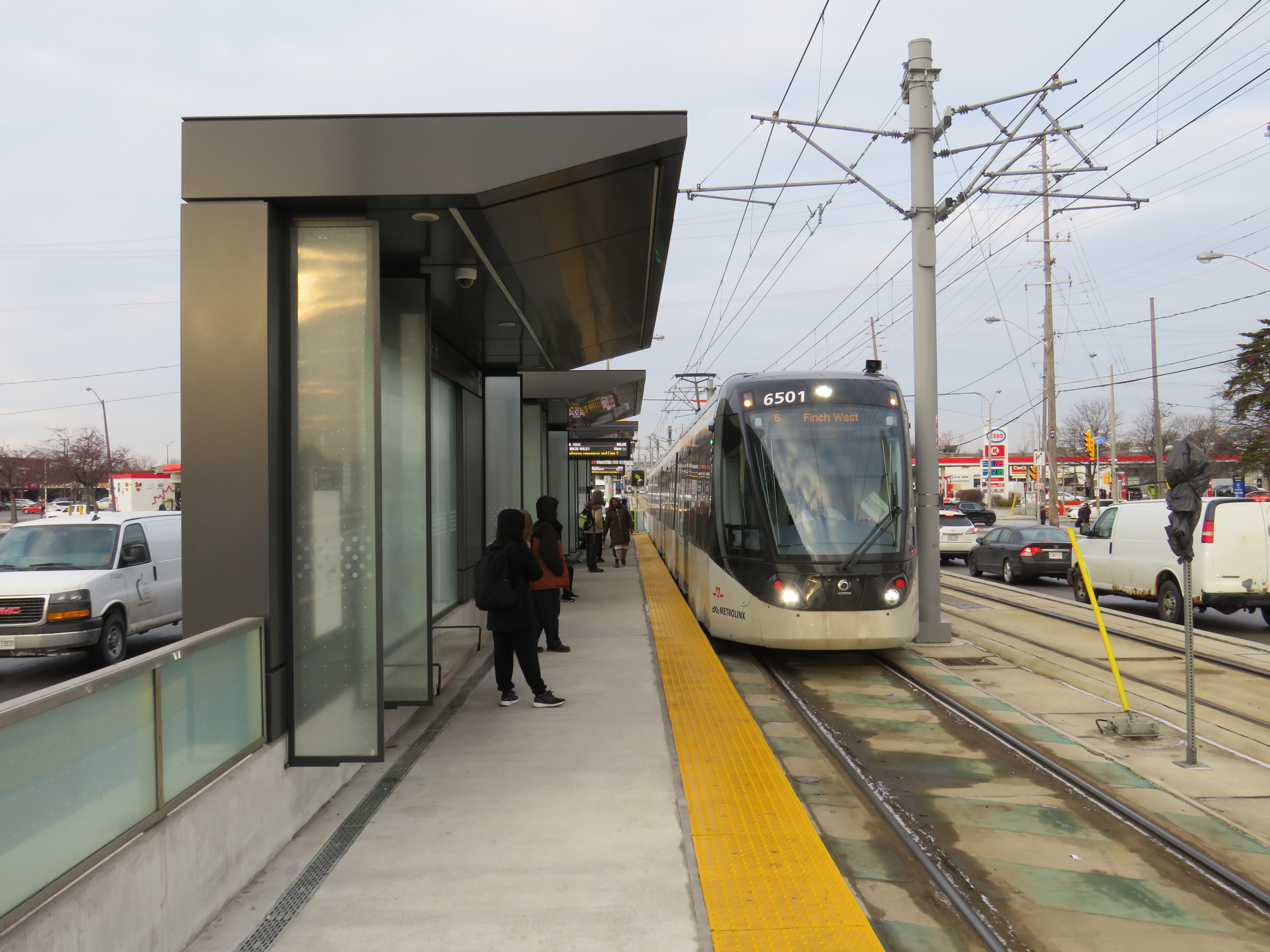
The Jane and Finch stop on Line 6 Finch West

Several major roadways run through the neighbourhood, including the two namesake streets that form its core; Jane Street and Finch Avenue. Other major thoroughfares that pass through it are Steeles Avenue to the north, Sheppard Avenue to the south, and Highway 400, a controlled access 400-series highway to the west.

=== Public transit ===
Public transit in the neighbourhood is provided by the Toronto Transit Commission (TTC).

Line 6 Finch West is a light rail line running along Finch Avenue. There are four stops; Norfinch Oakdale, Jane and Finch, Driftwood, and Tobermory, located in the neighbourhood, with the Jane and Finch stop located at the Jane-Finch intersection itself. The nearest subway station, Finch West, on the western branch of Line 1 Yonge-University, is located at Keele Street, 1 kilometre (0.62 mi) to the east, and is accessed via Line 6.

The TTC also operates several bus routes in the neighbourhood.

== Notable people ==
- Chuckie Akenz, hip hop musician
- Anthony Bennett, top overall pick in the 2013 NBA draft by the Cleveland Cavaliers
- Jully Black, R&B musician
- Oshae Brissett (born 1998), Israeli Basketball Premier League, former NBA, basketball player
- Denham Brown, professional basketball player
- Junior Cadougan, professional basketball player
- Dream Warriors, hip hop group
- Dwight Drummond, broadcaster
- Olu Famutimi, professional basketball player
- Nora Fatehi, Bollywood actress
- Louis Ferreira, actor
- Melanie Fiona, R&B musician
- Glenn Lewis, R&B musician
- Dean McDermott, actor, former husband of American actress Tori Spelling
- Michie Mee, hip hop musician
- Carlos Newton, former UFC Welterweight Champion
- Pressa, rap musician
- Paul Nguyen, community activist and creator of Jane-Finch.com
- Jessie Reyez, R&B/pop musician
- Cabral "Cabbie" Richards, TV personality
