= Jorge Martinez Colorado =

Mexican-Canadian actor

Jorge Martinez Colorado is a Mexican-Canadian actor. He is most noted for his performance as Camilo in the film Coyote, for which he won the Borsos Competition award for Best Performance in a Borsos Competition Film at the 2022 Whistler Film Festival.

He has also acted in the films Land of Men (Terre des hommes), The Greatest Country in the World (Le meilleur pays du monde) and Drunken Birds (Les oiseaux ivres), the television series Trauma and Le Temps des framboises, and roles on stage.
