= Land of Men =

2009 Canadian film

- French: Terre des hommes
- Directed by: Ky Nam Le Duc
- Written by: Ky Nam Le Duc
- Produced by: Ky Nam Le Duc
- Starring: Jorge Martinez Colorado; Rosa Zacharie; Hugues Saint-Louis
- Cinematography: François Messier-Rheault
- Edited by: Ève Gaudet
- Music by: Joé Trépanier
- Production company: Les Films de l'autre
- Distributed by: Travelling Distribution
- Release date: June 16, 2009 (CFC)
- Running time: 23 minutes
- Country: Canada
- Language: French

Land of Men (French: Terre des hommes) is a Canadian short drama film, directed by Ky Nam Le Duc and released in 2009. The film centres on José Maria (Jorge Martinez Colorado), an undocumented immigrant from Mexico who is detained in Quebec by police officers Catherine (Rosa Zacharie) and Patrick (Hugues Saint-Louis).

The film premiered in June 2009 at the CFC Worldwide Short Film Festival, where it won the award for Best Canadian Short Film. It was a Genie Award nominee for Best Live Action Short Drama at the 30th Genie Awards in 2010.
