= Ky Nam Le Duc =

Canadian film director

Ky Nam Le Duc is a Vietnamese Canadian film director and screenwriter. He is most noted for his 2009 short film Land of Men (Terre des hommes), which won the award for Best Canadian Short Film at the 2009 CFC Worldwide Short Film Festival and was a Genie Award nominee for Best Live Action Short Drama at the 30th Genie Awards in 2010.

Le Duc's second short film, Powder (Poudre), was released in 2010.

His debut feature film, Oscillations, premiered at the 2017 Festival du nouveau cinéma. He followed up in 2019 with The Greatest Country in the World (Le Meilleur pays du monde).
