= Vietnamese Canadians =

Canadians with Vietnamese ancestry

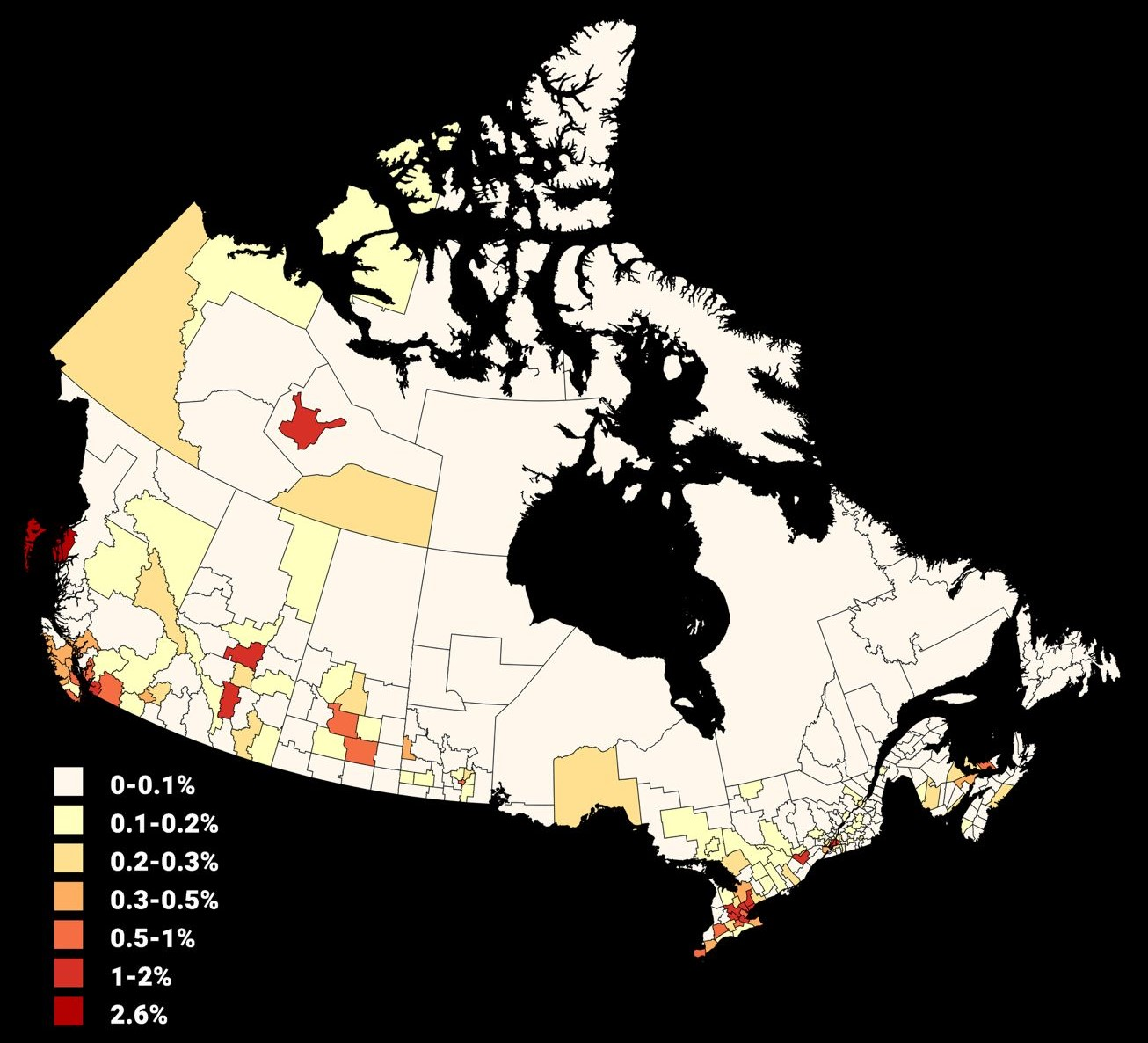
- Population distribution of Vietnamese Canadians by census division, 2021 census

Total population
- 275,530 (2021); 0.76% of the Canadian population (2021)

Regions with significant populations
- Toronto, Hamilton, Waterloo Region, London, Windsor, Ottawa, Montreal, Calgary, Edmonton, Metro Vancouver

Languages
- Vietnamese, Canadian English, Canadian French, Vietnamese French, languages of Canada

Religion
- Buddhism (48%) • Irreligion (24%); Catholic (22%) • Protestant (5%) • Other (1%); Vietnamese folk religion • Caodaism • Hòa Hảo

Related ethnic groups
- Vietnamese diaspora, Vietnamese Americans, Vietnamese people in France

Vietnamese Canadians (Vietnamese: Người Canada gốc Việt; French: Canadiens vietnamiens) are Canadian citizens of Vietnamese ancestry. As of 2021, there are 275,530 Vietnamese Canadians, most of whom reside in the provinces of Ontario, British Columbia, Alberta, and Quebec.

== History ==
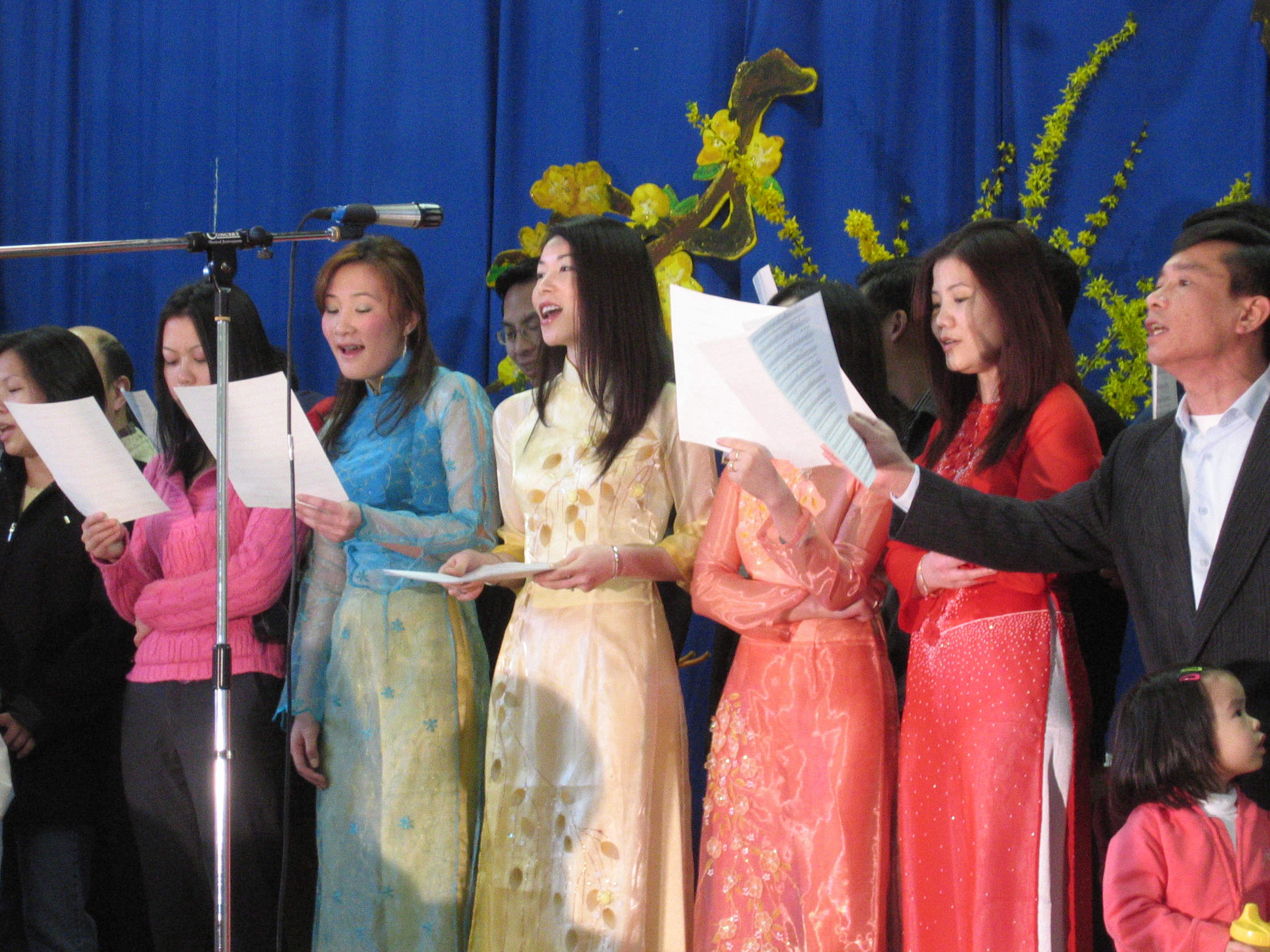
Vietnamese Canadians singing during Lunar New Year at St. Joseph's Church, Vancouver

Mainstream Vietnamese communities began arriving in Canada in the mid-1970s and early 1980s as refugees or boat people following the end of the Vietnam War in 1975, though a couple thousand were already living in Quebec before then, most of whom were students. After the Fall of Saigon, there were two waves of Vietnamese immigrants to Canada. The first wave consisted mostly of middle-class immigrants. Many of these immigrants were able to speak French and/or English and were welcomed into Canada for their professional skills. The second wave consisted of Southern Vietnamese refugees who were escaping the harsh regime that had taken over the former South Vietnam. Many of them were of Chinese descent and were escaping ethnic persecution resulting from the Sino-Vietnamese War. These south Vietnamese refugees were known globally as the "boat people".

In the years 1979–80, Canada accepted 60,000 Vietnamese refugees. Most new arrivees were sponsored by groups of individuals, temples, and churches and settled in areas around Toronto, Ontario, Vancouver, British Columbia, Winnipeg, Manitoba and Montreal, Quebec. Between 1975 and 1985, 110,000 resettled in Canada (23,000 in Ontario; 13,000 in Quebec; 8,000 in Alberta; 7,000 British Columbia; 5,000 in Manitoba; 3,000 in Saskatchewan; and 2,000 in the Maritime provinces). As time passed, most eventually settled in urban centres like Vancouver (2.2% Vietnamese), Calgary (1.6% Vietnamese), Montreal (1.6% Vietnamese), Edmonton (1.6% Vietnamese), Toronto (1.4% Vietnamese), Ottawa (1.0% Vietnamese), and Hamilton (0.8% Vietnamese).

The next wave of Vietnamese migration came in the late 1980s and 1990s as both refugees and immigrant classes of post-war Vietnam entered Canada. These groups settled in urban areas, in particular Toronto, Vancouver, Montreal, and Calgary. In Metro Vancouver, they have settled mainly in East Vancouver, Richmond, and Surrey. In the Montreal area, they settled in Montreal's downtown, South Shore, and the suburb of Laval. In Toronto, they have settled in the city's Chinatown area near Spadina Avenue and Dundas Street West and in the inner suburbs of North York, York, Scarborough, and Etobicoke. Other municipalities in the Toronto area with large Vietnamese Canadian populations include Mississauga, Brampton, Vaughan, and Markham.

The flag of South Vietnam is used by the majority of the Vietnamese diaspora in North America.

== Demographics ==
According to the 2011 National Household Survey, approximately 50% of Vietnamese Canadians identify as Buddhist, 25% identify as Christian, and the rest reported having no religious affiliation.

Vietnamese-Canadian population by province, 2021
Province	Vietnamese population
Ontario	122,735
British Columbia	51,890
Quebec	45,570
Alberta	39,395
Manitoba	7,290
Saskatchewan	4,730
Nova Scotia	1,374
New Brunswick	1,295
Prince Edward Island	730
Northwest Territories	225
Newfoundland and Labrador	175
Yukon	90
Nunavut	0
Canada (2021)	275,530

Canadian metropolitan areas with large Vietnamese-Canadian populations, 2021
City	Province	2021 Vietnamese population
Greater Toronto Area	Ontario	82,225
Greater Montreal	Quebec	38,660
Greater Vancouver	British Columbia	34,915
Calgary Region	Alberta	21,010
Edmonton Capital Region	Alberta	14,180
Ottawa-Gatineau	Ontario, Quebec	9,650
Winnipeg Capital Region	Manitoba	5,580
Waterloo Region	Ontario	5,555
Hamilton	Ontario	4,855
London	Ontario	3,110
Windsor	Ontario	2,555
Guelph	Ontario	2,425

== Notable Canadians of Vietnamese origin ==
=== Artists ===
- Bernadette Phan, visual artist
- Thao Lam, children's author and illustrator

=== Athletes ===
- Jade Chung, professional wrestler
- Tyler Crawford, professional soccer player
- Carol Huynh, freestyle wrestler, Olympic gold medallist
- Kequyen Lam, cross country skier
- Tuan Lam, professional poker player
- Pierre Lamothe, professional soccer player
- Nam Nguyen, figure skater
- Joseph Phan, figure skater
- Noel Prefontaine, football player
- Shiphtur, first e-sports athlete to receive a P1 athletic visa to the United States
- Tham Simpson, Paralympic wheelchair racer
- Aurélie Tran, gymnast
- Brittany Tran, curler
- Mervin Tran, figure skater
- WildTurtle, e-sports athlete
- TenZ, e-sports athlete

=== Businesspeople ===
- Charles Chi, entrepreneur, chancellor of Carleton University
- Trần Triệu Quân, engineer, businessman, and president of the International Taekwon-Do Federation

=== Fashion Industry ===
- Thien LE, fashion designer and founder of the Thien Le label
- Tommy Ton, photographer

=== Media, Film and Television ===
- Christy Chung, actress
- Mylène Dinh-Robic, actress
- Dianne Doan, actress (Warrior)
- Ashley Duong, filmmaker
- Céline Galipeau, broadcast journalist
- David Huynh, actor
- Linna Huynh, television presenter, actress and model
- Ky Nam Le Duc, filmmaker
- Marie-Christine Lê-Huu, playwright and actress
- Minh Le, video game designer and software engineer (Counter Strike)
- Kim Nguyen, film director and screenwriter
- Mayko Nguyen, actress
- Nguyen Ngoc Ngan, television host (Paris By Night), writer and essayist
- Paul Nguyen, documentarian, activist, and journalist
- Nguyen Thanh Tri, actor (The Greatest Country in the World)
- Andrew Phung, actor (Kim's Convenience)
- Chantal Thuy, actress (Black Lightning)
- Krew, a YouTube gaming group, consists of Kat La (Funneh), Betty La (Rainbow), Kim La (Gold), Wenny La (Lunar), and Allen La (Draco), all of whom are siblings

=== Musicians ===
- Chuckie Akenz, rapper
- Dang Thai Son, pianist
- Tam Doan, singer
- FrancisGotHeat, hip-hop producer
- Lê Dinh, singer-songwriter
- Chế Linh, singer
- Ngọc Bích Ngân singer-songwriter and actor
- Kristine Sa, singer-songwriter

=== Politicians ===
- Wayne Cao, MLA for Calgary Fort (1997–2011) (Progressive Conservative)
- Hoang Mai, MP for Brossard—La Prairie (NDP)
- Thanh Hai Ngo, first Canadian Senator of Vietnamese descent (Conservative)
- Anne Minh-Thu Quach, MP for Beauharnois—Salaberry (NDP)
- Chantal Petitclerc, Senator (Independent Senators Group) and Paralympic wheelchair racer
- Hung Pham, MLA for Calgary Montrose (1993–2008) (Progressive Conservative)
- Ève-Mary Thaï Thi Lac, former MP for Saint-Hyacinthe—Bagot (Bloc Québécois)
- Chi Nguyen, MP for Spadina—Harbourfront (Liberal Party of Canada)

=== Religious Figures ===
- Joseph Phuong Nguyen, Bishop for the Roman Catholic Diocese of Kamloops
- Vincent Nguyen, Auxiliary Bishop for the Roman Catholic Archdiocese of Toronto

=== Writers and Authors ===
- Vincent Lam, writer and doctor
- Mai Nguyen, writer
- Vinh Nguyen, writer
- Yasuko Thanh, writer
- Kim Thúy, writer, food critic, and lawyer
- Caroline Vu, writer and doctor

=== Other ===
- Hieu C. Truong, engineer, created minting machines for the Royal Canadian Mint
- Phan Thị Kim Phúc, humanitarian, UNESCO ambassador, Vietnam War survivor

== Business ==
In Canada, local Vietnamese media includes:

- Viet Nam Thoi Bao — Edmonton magazine
- Thoi Bao — Toronto newspaper
- Thoi Bao TV — Toronto
- Thoi Moi — Toronto newspaper
- Little Saigon Canada — Toronto newspaper
- Vietnamville — Montreal
- Phố Việt Montreal, printed newspaper of Vietnamville.ca
- Viethomes Magazine — Toronto magazine
- Culture Magazin — national magazine, first-ever bilingual English-Vietnamese magazine in Canada

In Vancouver, a large population of Vietnamese Canadians are self-employed as owners of a variety of businesses, stores and restaurants throughout the city. Vietnamese Canadians also brought their cuisine and phở has become a popular food throughout the city. Vietnamese Canadians also reside in Central City, Surrey, which is a rapidly growing suburb of Metro Vancouver.

In the Toronto area, there are 19 Vietnamese owned supermarkets.

In Montreal there are about 40,000 Vietnamese Canadian population among highest median income and education of Vietnamese Canadians in major cities. There are more than 100 Vietnamese restaurants, hundreds of small size manufacturers of different products from clothing to technology, about 80 pharmacies and hundreds of doctors, dentists, over a thousand scientists, engineers and technicians, about sixty convenience stores and groceries. Since November 2006, Ngo Van Tan has started a project to promote and build the first 'Vietnam Town' in Canada called 'Vietnamville' near metro Jean Talon including St-Denis, Jean Talon, St-Hubert, and Belanger streets with over 130 businesses already opened in the area. Investment opportunities in Vietnam Town are open to Vietnamese worldwide.

== See also ==
- Canada–Vietnam relations
- Overseas Vietnamese
- Asian Canadians
- Vietnamese in Toronto
