= Coyote (2022 film) =

2022 Canadian drama film

- Directed by: Katherine Jerkovic
- Written by: Katherine Jerkovic
- Produced by: Nicolas Comeau
- Starring: Jorge Martinez Colorado; Eva Avila; Enzo Desmeules
- Cinematography: Léna Mill-Reuillard
- Edited by: Sophie Farkas Bolla
- Music by: David Drury
- Production company: 1976 Productions
- Distributed by: FunFilm Distribution, Game Theory Films
- Release date: September 11, 2022 (TIFF)
- Running time: 89 minutes
- Country: Canada
- Languages: Spanish, French

Coyote (French: Le Coyote) is a Canadian drama film, directed by Katherine Jerkovic and released in 2022. The film stars Jorge Martinez Colorado as Camilo, a Mexican immigrant to Canada who is rebuilding his life as a chef in La Malbaie, Quebec, who finds his plan complicated when his adult daughter Tania (Eva Avila) shows up needing his help to care for her son (Enzo Desmeules) while she enters recovery for her drug addiction problems.

The film entered production in fall 2021.

The film premiered in the Contemporary World Cinema stream at the 2022 Toronto International Film Festival on September 11, 2022. It later screened in the Borsos Competition at the 2022 Whistler Film Festival, where it won the awards for Best Borsos Competition Film and Best Performance in a Borsos Competition Film (Martinez Colorado). Coyote had its US premier in competition at the Santa Barbara International Film Festival It was awarded Best Narrative Feature and Best Actor (Jorge Martinez Colorado) at the Brooklyn Film Festival, and won the same awards at Venice Film Week and the 44th Brussels Independent Film Festival, among other.
