= Vinh Nguyen =

Vietnamese Canadian writer

Vinh Nguyen is a Vietnamese-Canadian writer based in Toronto, Ontario, who published his debut book The Migrant Rain Falls in Reverse in 2025. The book, a memoir of his family's experiences coming to Canada as refugees, was shortlisted for the 2025 Hilary Weston Writers' Trust Prize for Nonfiction and the 2025 Toronto Book Awards.

He received a Bachelor of Arts in English in 2005 from the University of Calgary, then moved to Tokyo to teach English before returning to Canada to study at McMaster University where he earned a Master of Arts and PhD.

He is an associate professor of English at the University of Waterloo, specializing in Asian diasporic writing.

He is out as gay.
