= Lê Dinh =

Vietnamese composer (1934–2020)

- Born: Lê Văn Dinh; September 8, 1934; Vĩnh Hựu, Gò Công, French Cochinchina, French Indochina
- Died: November 9, 2020 (aged 86) Longueuil, Québec, Canada
- Genres: Yellow music
- Occupation: musician
- Member of: Lê Minh Bằng
- Formerly of: Nhật Nguyệt Hồ

Lê Dinh (1934 – 9 November 2020) was a Vietnamese-Canadian songwriter. From 1957 to 1975 he worked at Radio Saigon. In 1978 he emigrated, via Taiwan to Montreal. He criticized the sterility of Socialist music since 1975.
