= Nguyen Thanh Tri =

Vietnamese-Canadian actor

Nguyen Thanh Tri, also known professionally as Sean Lu, is a Vietnamese Canadian actor based in Quebec. He is most noted for his performance as Hiên in the 2019 film The Greatest Country in the World (Le meilleur pays du monde), for which he was a Prix Iris nominee for Best Actor at the 24th Quebec Cinema Awards in 2022.
