= Paul Nguyen (filmmaker) =

Canadian filmmaker

Paul Nguyen MSM OMC
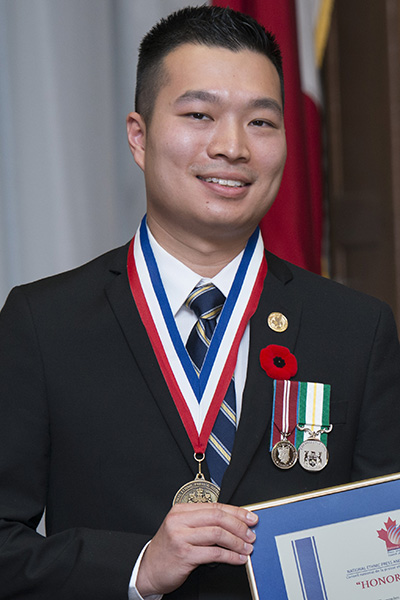
- Paul Nguyen receiving an award at the Ontario Legislative Building.
- Born: Paul Nguyen; February 23, 1980 (age 46); Toronto, Ontario, Canada
- Education: York University (B.A.)
- Occupations: Filmmaker, activist, journalist
- Website: Jane-Finch.com

Paul Nguyen, MSM OMC (born February 23, 1980) is a Canadian filmmaker, politician and social activist. In 2012, he was among the first 60 Canadians to receive the Queen Elizabeth II Diamond Jubilee Medal at the inaugural presentation ceremony at Rideau Hall to honour significant contributions and achievements to the country. He is featured on Noteworthy Canadians of Asian heritage by the Government of Canada.

Nguyen co-produced the Netflix true crime documentary What Jennifer Did, which explored the Jennifer Pan case. It became the number one Netflix movie in the world during its first week of release and the most-watched documentary movie in 2024.

Nguyen was the Progressive Conservative Party of Ontario's candidate for the district of Humber River—Black Creek in the 2022 Ontario general election and 2025 Ontario general election.

== Life and career ==
Nguyen was born in Toronto, Ontario to Vietnamese parents who fled to Canada after the fall of Saigon during The Vietnam War. After graduating from C.W. Jefferys Collegiate Institute, he attended York University and earned his Bachelor of Arts in film in 2004. Nguyen grew up in the Jane and Finch neighbourhood. In 2004, Nguyen created Jane-Finch.com to address the constant negative media coverage about his community.

== Jane-Finch.com ==
Nguyen launched Jane-Finch.com on March 13, 2004, in response to negative stereotypes about the Jane and Finch community. The website gives an unprecedented look at the neighbourhood and features a multimedia library of information. In late 2005, a community news section was added to allow reporters to document local events not covered by the mainstream media. The website produces music videos, public service announcements, and broadcasts local political debates and town halls. In addition to the production of original content, the website also publishes submissions from residents.

=== Reception ===
The website has received widespread critical acclaim and national media attention. In 2005, the website was featured on the Global Television Network evening newscast, Global National. In late 2005, CBC Radio host Shelagh Rogers featured the website for a special edition of Sounds Like Canada. In 2008, the website was selected by Now Magazine among "9 things we love about Jane-Finch". The website won back-to-back Canadian Ethnic Media Association Awards in 2010 and 2011 for its ongoing community news coverage and the 2011 Heritage Toronto Award of Excellence in the media category. In 2021, Nguyen received the Star Metroland Media Urban Hero Award for combating stereotypes.

== Media career ==
Nguyen is a frequent media commentator on social issues affecting the Jane and Finch community.

=== Advocacy ===
Nguyen has used his media footing to offer his opinion or act as an advocate for various issues.

- February 3, 2005, Nguyen appeared on Global National to talk about his viral music video You Got Beef? and Jane-Finch.com.
- August 4, 2005, Nguyen appeared on G4 Tech TV's Gadgets and Gizmos detailing his community work in the Jane and Finch area.
- October 18, 2005, CBC Radio Metro Morning host Andy Barrie introduced Nguyen's uncensored op-ed "The Real Toronto".
- December 2, 2005, Nguyen took CBC host Shelagh Rogers on a tour of Jane and Finch for an episode of Sounds Like Canada.
- January 14, 2006, Nguyen appeared on CBC's Canada Now to discuss solutions to gun violence.
- May 24, 2007, Nguyen and Mark Simms appeared on CTV's The Verdict with Paula Todd to discuss the Jordan Manners shooting.
- Summer 2007, Nguyen discussed the CBC Television documentary Lost in the Struggle in the Ryerson Review of Journalism.
- May 12, 2008, Nguyen talked about the growth of Jane-Finch.com in The Toronto Sun.
- June 18, 2009, Nguyen appeared on Goldhawk Live with Dwight Drummond and Anthony Perruzza to discuss the future of Jane and Finch.
- January 8, 2009, Nguyen spoke out in The Toronto Star against the rebranding of Jane and Finch to University Heights.
- January 8, 2010, Nguyen appeared on CBC's Metro Morning to give his opinion on Toronto's unsolved murder rate.
- July 5, 2010, Nguyen was interviewed on Radio Canada International's The Link with Marc Montgomery about winning the Paul Yuzyk Award.
- October 6, 2010, Nguyen asked then-mayoral candidate Rob Ford how he would help solve the problems in the Jane-Finch area on CBC Radio's Metro Morning.
- December 13, 2010, Judy Sgro, PC, MP praised Nguyen's community work in the House of Commons of Canada.
- June 4, 2012, Nguyen appeared on the CTV News Channel program, National Affairs, to discuss reaction to the Toronto Eaton Centre shooting.
- June 29, 2012, Nguyen appeared on Voice of America about being the first Vietnamese-Canadian to receive the Queen Elizabeth II Diamond Jubilee Medal.

== Broadcast ==
Nguyen has produced several documentaries featuring Toronto's Jane and Finch neighborhood. In 2006, Nguyen served as an associate producer on the Gemini Award-nominated CBC documentary Lost in the Struggle. Nguyen and Mark Simms spent 10 months following the lives of three troubled youth from the Jane and Finch neighborhood. The story was updated six years later in Lost in the Struggle: The Next Chapter, which aired on CBC on October 26, 2012.

- What Jennifer Did (co-producer) (Netflix, 2024)
- Rap Battle (producer) (CBC, The Doc Project, 2020)
- Year of the Gun (associate producer) (CBC Docs POV, 2019)
- Lost in the Struggle: The Next Chapter (associate producer) (CBC Television, the fifth estate, 2012)
- Revealed: Missing the Target (associate producer) (Canwest Global/90th Parallel Prod., 2010)
- Goldhawk Live: What's in the future for Jane and Finch? (community associate producer) (Rogers TV, 2009)
- Ian Jones: Activist and Artist, How the Steelpan is Changing Lives (director) (Bravo!/Leda Serene Films, 2007)
- Give A 'Hood A Bad Name... (producer) (CBC Radio One, "Outfront" 2007)
- Lost in the Struggle (associate producer) (CBC Television, the fifth estate, 2006)
- Racism: Wash it Away (director) (Racism. Stop It! National Video Competition/MuchMusic, 1999)

== Awards ==
- 2026: Nguyen received the Hua Cai Award
- 2025: Nguyen received the King Charles III Coronation Medal from MP Judy Sgro
- 2025: Nguyen received the National Ethnic Press and Media Council of Canada Award
- 2021: Nguyen received the Metroland Media Group Urban Hero Award
- 2019: Nguyen received the Canadian Ethnic Media Association (CEMA) Award in the Internet category for Why Am I Still Alive?.
- 2018: Nguyen was awarded a Canada's Volunteer Award from Minister of Families, Children and Social Development Jean-Yves Duclos for creating unique opportunities for the at-risk youth.
- 2018: Nguyen received the Canadian Ethnic Media Association (CEMA) Award for best podcast.
- 2017: Nguyen was awarded the Sovereign's Medal for Volunteers from Toronto Mayor John Tory for his efforts to eliminate racial discrimination through Jane-Finch.com.
- 2017: Nguyen was awarded the June Callwood Award from Minister of Citizenship and Immigration Laura Albanese.
- 2015: Nguyen was awarded the Meritorious Service Medal from Governor General David Johnston for his website in allowing area resident's voices to be heard.
- 2012: Nguyen received the National Ethnic Press and Media Council of Canada Award from the Lieutenant Governor of Ontario, David C. Onley, at the Ontario Legislative Building.
- 2012: Nguyen received the Queen Elizabeth II Diamond Jubilee Medal from the Governor General of Canada, David Johnston and Prime Minister of Canada, Stephen Harper, for fighting stereotypes and acting as role model and mentor for at risk youth.
- 2011: Nguyen received the Heritage Toronto Award of Excellence for preserving the living cultural history of the Jane-Finch neighbourhood. The 37th annual awards ceremony was held at Koerner Hall, the Royal Conservatory of Music.
- 2011: Nguyen received the Newcomer Champion Award from Dr. Eric Hoskins, Minister of Citizenship and Immigration. He was recognized as a community leader in the Jane and Finch area who promotes civic engagement with at-risk youth.
- 2011: Nguyen received the Bobbie Resnick Philanthropy Award from the Toronto chapter of the International Association of Business Communicators (IABC/Toronto) for outstanding leadership and service to the community.
- 2010: Nguyen was granted the Ontario Medal for Good Citizenship. He was invested at Queen's Park by the Lieutenant Governor of Ontario, Canada, David C. Onley.
- 2010: Nguyen received the Canadian Ethnic Media Association (CEMA) Award for best ethnic internet journalism in Canada.
- 2010: Paul Nguyen received the Paul Yuzyk Award for Multiculturalism for making significant contributions to multiculturalism in Canada from the Minister of Citizenship, Immigration and Multiculturalism, Jason Kenney, PC, MP. Nguyen received a $20,000 grant towards a non-profit organization of his choice. He was selected among 88 nominees across Canada.
- 2009: Nguyen was honoured at the City of Toronto's Access, Equity and Human Rights Awards. Nguyen received the William P. Hubbard Award for Race Relations for outstanding achievement in fostering a positive race relations environment and the elimination of racism and prejudice in Toronto. The award was presented at Toronto City Hall by City Councillor Gord Perks and the Mayor of Toronto, David Miller.
- 1999: Nguyen was one of ten winners in Citizenship and Immigration Canada's Racism. Stop It! National Video Competition. His winning entry was broadcast nationally on MuchMusic. Nguyen was awarded by former Secretary of State for Multiculturalism and Status of Women, Dr. Hedy Fry. The winners were selected among 320 entries across Canada. The 1999 winners were brought to Toronto for a March 3 taping of the MuchMusic Stop Racism Concert and Video Awards Program.

== Short films ==
- Know Your Rights (executive producer), Jane-Finch.com (2010)
- Open Your Eyes (director) (2007)
- You Got Beef? starring Chuckie Akenz (director) (2004)

== Electoral record ==
2025 Ontario general election: Humber River—Black Creek
Party	Candidate	Votes	%	±%	Expenditures
New Democratic	Tom Rakocevic	8,788	35.33	+0.84	$107,102
Progressive Conservative	Paul Nguyen	8,595	34.55	+4.80	$50,401
Liberal	Liban Hassan	6,811	27.38	–3.28	$84,963
Green	Alexander Qanbery	402	1.62	–0.25	$0
Communist	Jeanne McGuire	280	1.13	–	$0
Total valid votes/expense limit		24,876	98.70	–	$117,711
Total rejected, unmarked and declined ballots		328	1.30	–0.14	
Turnout		25,204	34.65	+1.50	
Eligible voters		72,740			
New Democratic hold		Swing		–1.98	
Source: Elections Ontario

2022 Ontario general election: Humber River—Black Creek
Party	Candidate	Votes	%	±%	Expenditures
New Democratic	Tom Rakocevic	7,959	34.49	–2.93	$92,545
Liberal	Ida Li Preti	7,076	30.66	+2.72	$64,439
Progressive Conservative	Paul Nguyen	6,865	29.75	–0.54	$63,667
Green	Keith Berry	430	1.86	+0.30	$1,068
Ontario Party	Lee Miguel Gonzalez	357	1.55	–	$4,264
New Blue	Iulian Caunei	281	1.22	–	$1,023
Independent	Knia Singh	110	0.48	–	$1,296
Total valid votes/expense limit		23,078	98.56	–	$98,948
Total rejected, unmarked and declined ballots		337	1.44	+0.17	
Turnout		23,415	33.15	–14.11	
Eligible voters		70,632			
New Democratic hold		Swing		▼2.83	
Source: Elections Ontario
