= C. W. Jefferys Collegiate Institute =

C.W. Jefferys Collegiate Institute
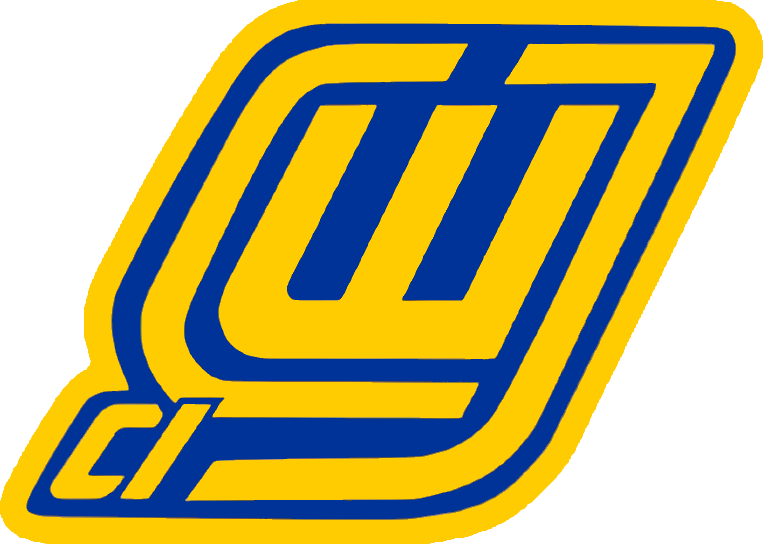

Location
- 340 Sentinel Road; Toronto, Ontario, M3J 1T9; Canada; 43.758275°N 79.500391°W

Information
- School type: High school
- Founded: 1965
- School board: Toronto District School Board
- Superintendent: Domenic Giorgi
- Area trustee: Matias de Dovitiis
- Principal: Shelina Kassam
- Grades: 9-12
- Enrolment: 809 (2019-20)
- Language: English
- Schedule type: Semestered
- Colours: Blue and Gold
- Mascot: Yellowjackets
- Team name: Yellowjackets
- Website: schoolweb.tdsb.on.ca/cwjefferys/
- Last updated: June 13, 2025

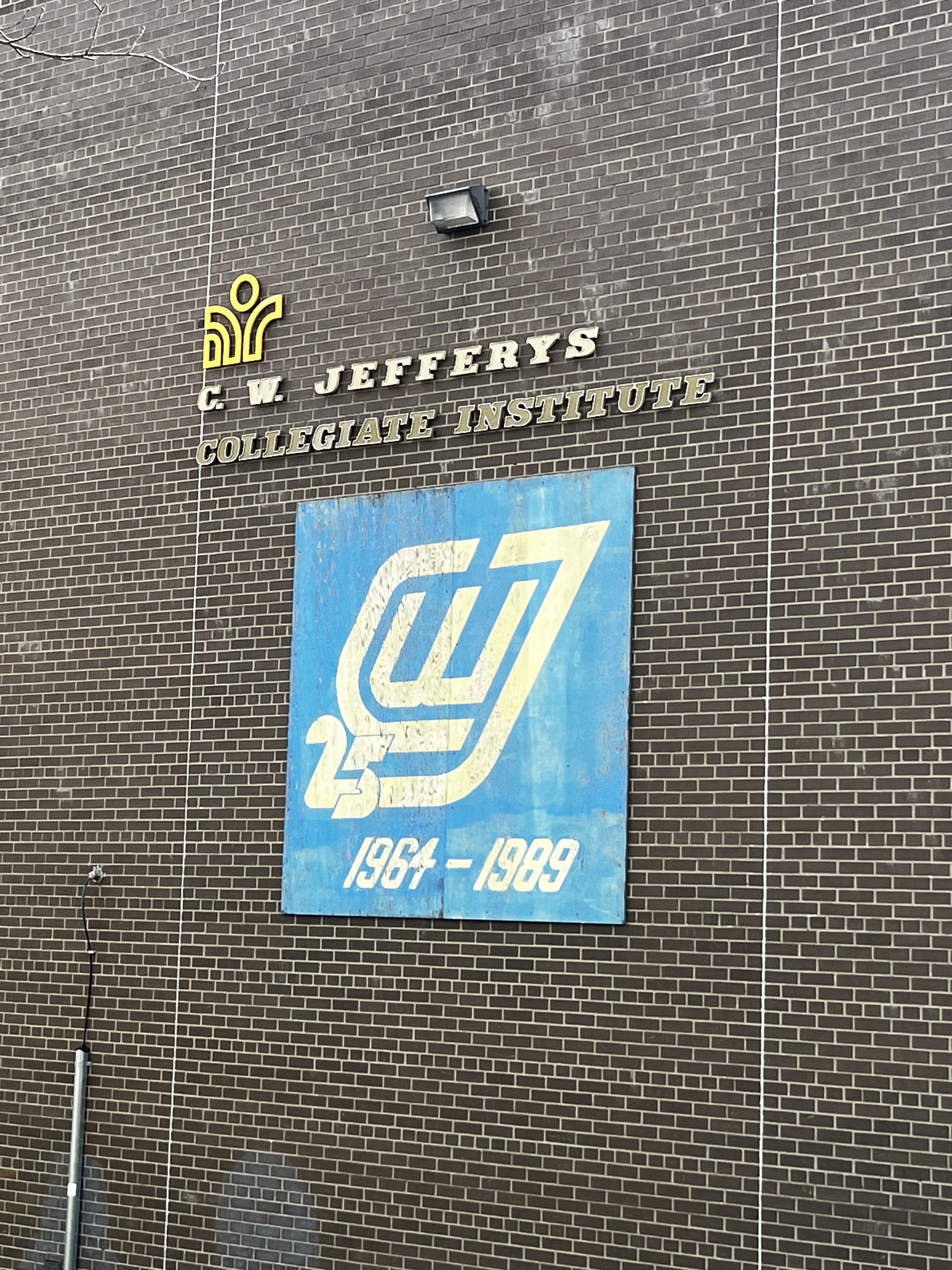
A picture of one of the school's outside walls containing the school's name and logo.

C.W. Jefferys Collegiate Institute is a semestered public secondary school in the Keele and Finch area of Toronto, Ontario, Canada.

== History ==
The school was founded in 1965. It was named after Charles William Jefferys, a Canadian artist whose work has contributed much to education in the areas of Canadian History and Art. The first Head of the Art Department was James Meechan, a stained glass artist.

Graduation rates at the school, which had been low, improved significantly after 2015, when, as part of a school board pilot project, grade 9 and 10 classes were destreamed to create more flexibility for students. Principal Monday Gala was later recognized as an outstanding educator for this initiative.

== Academics ==
The school offers a Visual Arts Program which draws students from the neighbouring school area; many of the teaching staff for this program are practicing artists. Additionally, it is home to the ESTeM Enriched Science, Technology and Mathematics Program; a project-based, hands-on, exploratory approach to Sciences, Mathematics, and Computer Technology.

The school participates in York University's Advanced Credit Experience (ACE) program, which provides co-operative learning experiences in the community.

The school also runs student success initiatives supporting "at risk" students through the Learning to 18 pilot project, "Stay Connected", mentorship and the credit recovery program offered at the school. There is also an after-school activity program and a Focus on Youth summer job program.

The academic and student support initiatives have resulted in an increasing number of students securing bursaries or scholarships for post-secondary education.

== Athletics ==
- Badminton (Co-ed)
- Baseball (Boys)
- Basketball (Boys)
- Heroes (Co-ed)
- Chess
- Cricket (Girls)
- Cross Country (Co-ed)
- Football (Boys)
- Soccer (Girls & boys)
- Softball (Girls) [Upcoming]
- Swimming (Co-ed)
- Track & Field (Co-ed)
- Ultimate Frisbee (Co-ed)
- Volleyball (Girls, boys & co-ed)
- Wrestling (Co-ed)

== Extra Curricular Club ==
- Boundless Adventures
- Choir
- Drumline
- Ecological team
- Equity
- Gay-Straight Alliance
- Jazz band
- Rock band
- Robotics
- Leaders Today
- Go LOCAL
- Chess club
- Generation Change
- Prom Committee
- Welcoming Committee
- STARS

== Notable alumni ==
- Gabe Gala, Canadian soccer player
- Paul Nguyen, Canadian politician, filmmaker and social activist
- Paul Godfrey, former chairman of Metropolitan Toronto
- Luther Brown, choreographer/judge on So You Think You Can Dance Canada
- Jully Black, award-winning Juno Award winner for Canadian R&B Artist
- Tom Rakocevic, Member of Provincial Parliament for Humber River-Black Creek since 2018

== Incidents ==
In May 2007, 15-year-old Jordan Manners was shot and killed in a hallway of the school, marking the first fatal school shooting in Toronto. Two 17-year-olds were charged for the shooting, but the case remains unsolved.

In 2017, a student who was on an overnight trip to Algonquin Park drowned after being allowed to participate in water activities. It is believed that the student in question did not pass the required swimming test.

== See also ==
- Education in Ontario
- List of secondary schools in Ontario
- List of school related attacks
