= Ngọc Bích Ngân =

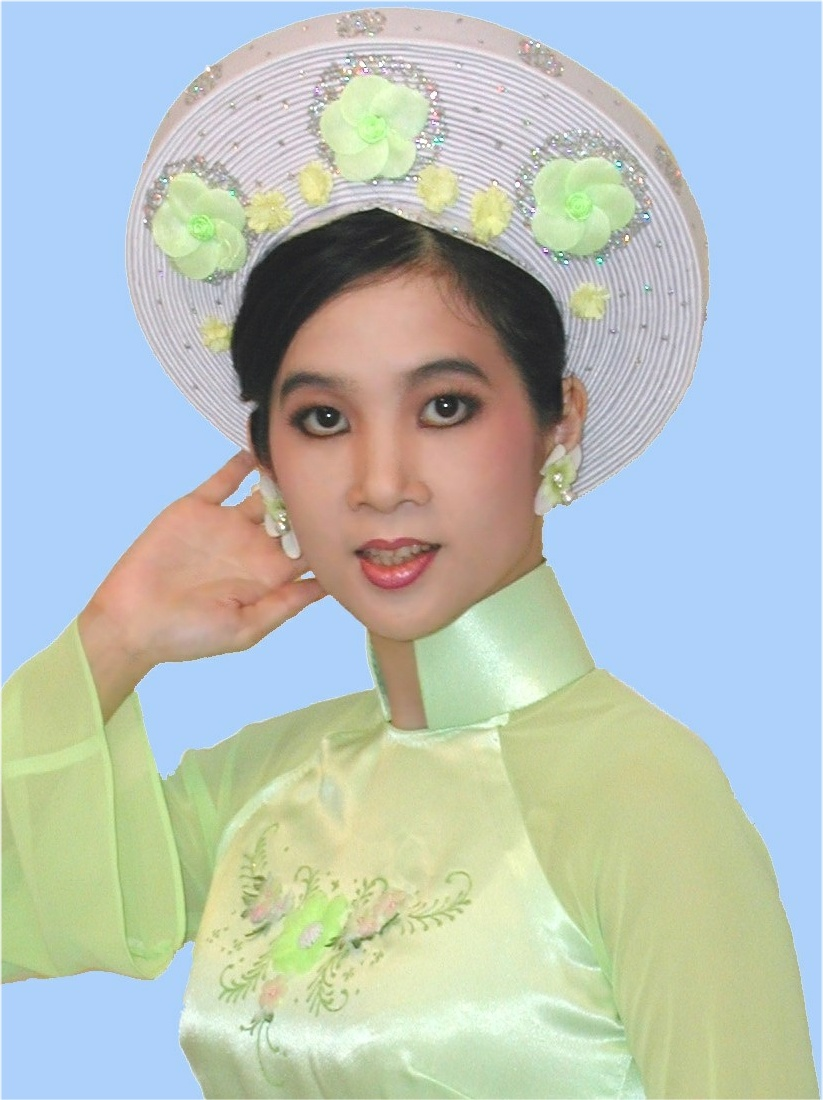
- Ngọc Bích Ngân in Dazzling Traditional Gown

Background information
- Born: Nguyễn Ngọc Bích Ngân; 16 September 1973 (age 53)
- Origin: Mỹ Tho, Vietnam
- Occupations: Artist, Writer, Singer

Nguyễn Ngọc Bích Ngân (born 16 September 1973 in Mỹ Tho) is a Vietnamese-Canadian singer, songwriter, artist and writer. Beside being a performer, Ngoc Bich Ngan is also a writer and essayist at Vietnamese national newspapers such as Thoi Bao Tap Chi Ca Dao, Thoi Moi media and more. She was baptized a Catholic and has the Christian name Martha, St. Therese of the Infant Jesus.

As a devout Roman Catholic, together with other worldwide Catholic performers as well-known singer Khánh-Ly, famous MC Nguyễn Ngọc Ngạn, Ngoc Bich Ngan has participated as a volunteer singer and worker at World Youth Day from July 24 – 27, 2002, to welcome Pope John Paul II to Toronto, Ontario, Canada.

== Albums ==
- Cung Thứ (The Sad Minor Key): Love and Romantic Songs. (Vietnamese) The Drizzle The Ocean Recalls
- Đêm Băng Giá (That Frosty Night): Canticles & Christmas Songs. (French, Vietnamese)
- Những Cánh Sóng (The Wavelets of Love): Soft and Melodious Songs (English, French & Vietnamese) Scarborough Fair...

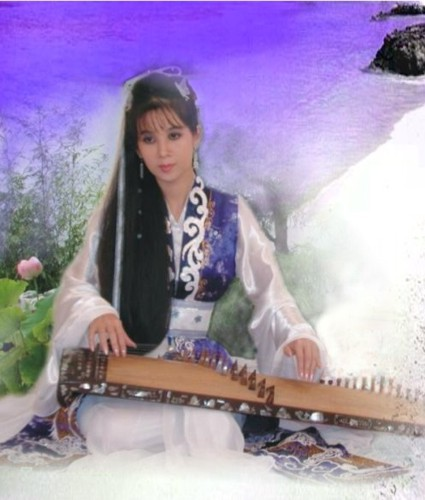
Ngọc Bích Ngân playing đàn tranh

== Published Novels and Short Stories ==
Thời Báo (ThoiBao-info) – with the following columns: Knowledge - Aesthetics - Music - Living – Society, Woman’s Corner; Poetry & Short Story

Tap Chi Ca Dao (TapchiCa Dao) – with the following columns : Do You Know?/ Knowledge – Aesthetics & Poetry - Woman's Corner

== Composed Songs ==
- Cung Thứ, Đàn Yêu
- Giọt Buồn Thiếu Phụ
- Nói Cùng Gió Xuân
- Hoa Lòng Của Bé Mục Đồng
- Cô Đơn, Đoàn Thanh Niên
- Mộng Tuyết
- Đêm Băng Giá
- Chuyện Cây Thông

== Articles written ==
- At Phố Việt Newspaper Quỳ Bên Hang Đá Lộ Thiên - By NBN (Poem: Kneeling Beside The Outdoor St-Crib).
- At ThoiBao Media:MICHELANGELO - by NBNWolfgang Amadeus Mozart - NBNFrédéric Chopin - by NBN.
- At Tap Chi Ca Giao:Kelly Grace - by NBN.
- At Thoi Moi media:Elvis Aaron Presley - by NBN.
- At a Catholic online Magazine:Xuan Tan Ty Nam Nay - by NBN.

== Sources ==
- Ngoc Bich Ngan's Biography: NBN biography.
- Pho Viet Newspaper - Vietnamville Online News
- Đặng Hiếu Sinh (2002). The Editor of Tap chi Ca Dao Magazine: Article in English:The Little Flower.
- Nguyen Vu Van, member of The Vietnamese Writers Abroad P.E.N Centre. The Poet-Singer Lady Article in English
- Thoi Bao Media (2003). Published in Toronto & Montreal, Quebec, Canada - #931, Jan 2003.
- Truong Ky (2000). Tuyen Tap Nghe Si #4 - Published Worldwide - Year 1999 & 2000.
- Tap chi Ca Dao Magazine (2003). Published in Texas, USA - #63,02 Aug 2
