= Canadian Ethnic Media Association =

Canadian professional organization

- Predecessor: Canadian Ethnic Journalists and Writers Club
- Formation: November 9, 1978; 47 years ago
- Founder: Sierhey Khmara Ziniak
- Type: Non-profit NGO
- Location: Canada
- Chair: Madeline Ziniak
- President: Kiu Rezvanifar
- Website: canadianethnicmedia.com

The Canadian Ethnic Media Association (CEMA), founded in 1978 as the Canadian Ethnic Journalists and Writers Club, is an organization for professionals engaged in the field of print and electronic journalism and creative writing.

CEMA upholds the principles of Canadian citizenship and multiculturalism and maintains and the right of freedom of expression without ethnocentric bias. The emphasis of CEMA is on the exchange of ideas rather than lobbying although, when necessary, statements are made on pressing topics to whomever they may concern such as the exclusion of ethnic journalists from sources of news and information open to mainstream media.

CEMA operates as an independent organization, without financial support from governments.

It hosts an annual award and in 2004 also established the Sierhey Khmara Ziniak Award for the best contribution to the idea of multiculturalism through journalism.

== Board of directors ==
- Chair, Madeline Ziniak
- President, Kiumars (Kiu) Rezvanifar, Editor at Persian Tribune
- 1st Vice President, Vasil Yancoff, Producer, Macedonian Heritage Hour;
- Treasurer, Irene Chu, Toronto Writers' Association and Chinese Canadian News;
- Secretary, Gina Valle, Writer/researcher;
- Membership, Elena Zolotko, Russian journalist;
- Webmaster, Zuhair Kashmeri, OMNI-TV South Asian News and Diversity commentator; author, writer and editor; TV documentary producer;
- Membership, Alexander Gershtein – Journalist and documentary producer;
- Immediate Past President, Ace Alvarez, Managing Editor, Producer, Front Page Philippines.
