= The Greatest Country in the World =

- French: Le meilleur pays du monde
- Directed by: Ky Nam Le Duc
- Written by: Ky Nam Le Duc
- Produced by: Ky Nam Le Duc; Étienne Hansez
- Starring: Nguyen Thanh Tri; Mickaël Gouin; Stanley Junior Jean-Baptiste; Schelby Jean-Baptiste
- Cinematography: Isabelle Stachtchenko
- Edited by: Ky Vy Le Duc
- Music by: Alexis Aubin-Marchand; Thomas Champagne
- Production company: Les Films de l’Autre
- Distributed by: FunFilm Distribution
- Release date: October 13, 2019 (FNC)
- Running time: 112 minutes
- Country: Canada
- Languages: French; Vietnamese; English

The Greatest Country in the World (French: Le meilleur pays du monde) is a Canadian drama film, directed by Ky Nam Le Duc and released in 2019. Set in a reality in which Canada has just elected a far right government that is threatening to deport refugees and immigrants, the film centres on Hiên (Nguyen Thanh Tri), a Vietnamese immigrant who is preparing to move back to Vietnam, and Alex (Mickaël Gouin), the boyfriend of Hiên's daughter Phuong (Alice Tran) who has already left the country, as they help Junior (Stanley Junior Jean-Baptiste) try to locate his mother Roseline (Schelby Jean-Baptiste) when she disappears.

The film premiered at the Festival du nouveau cinéma in 2019. It was screened at the Reelworld Film Festival in 2020, where it won the Audience Choice Award, and at the 2020 Toronto Reel Asian International Film Festival, before going into commercial release in 2021.

Nguyen Thanh Tri received a Prix Iris nomination for Best Actor at the 24th Quebec Cinema Awards in 2022.
