= List of people from Mississauga =

This is a list of people from Mississauga, Ontario. The list includes people from Toronto Township, the Village and Town of Port Credit, and the Village and Town of Streetsville, predecessors of the modern community.

== A ==
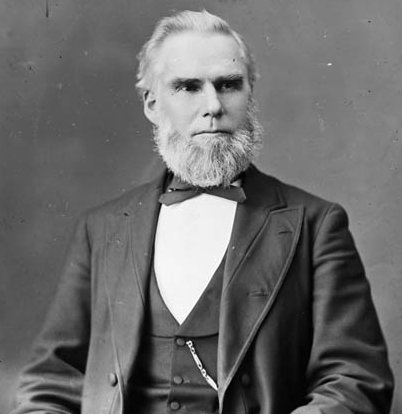
James Cox Aikins

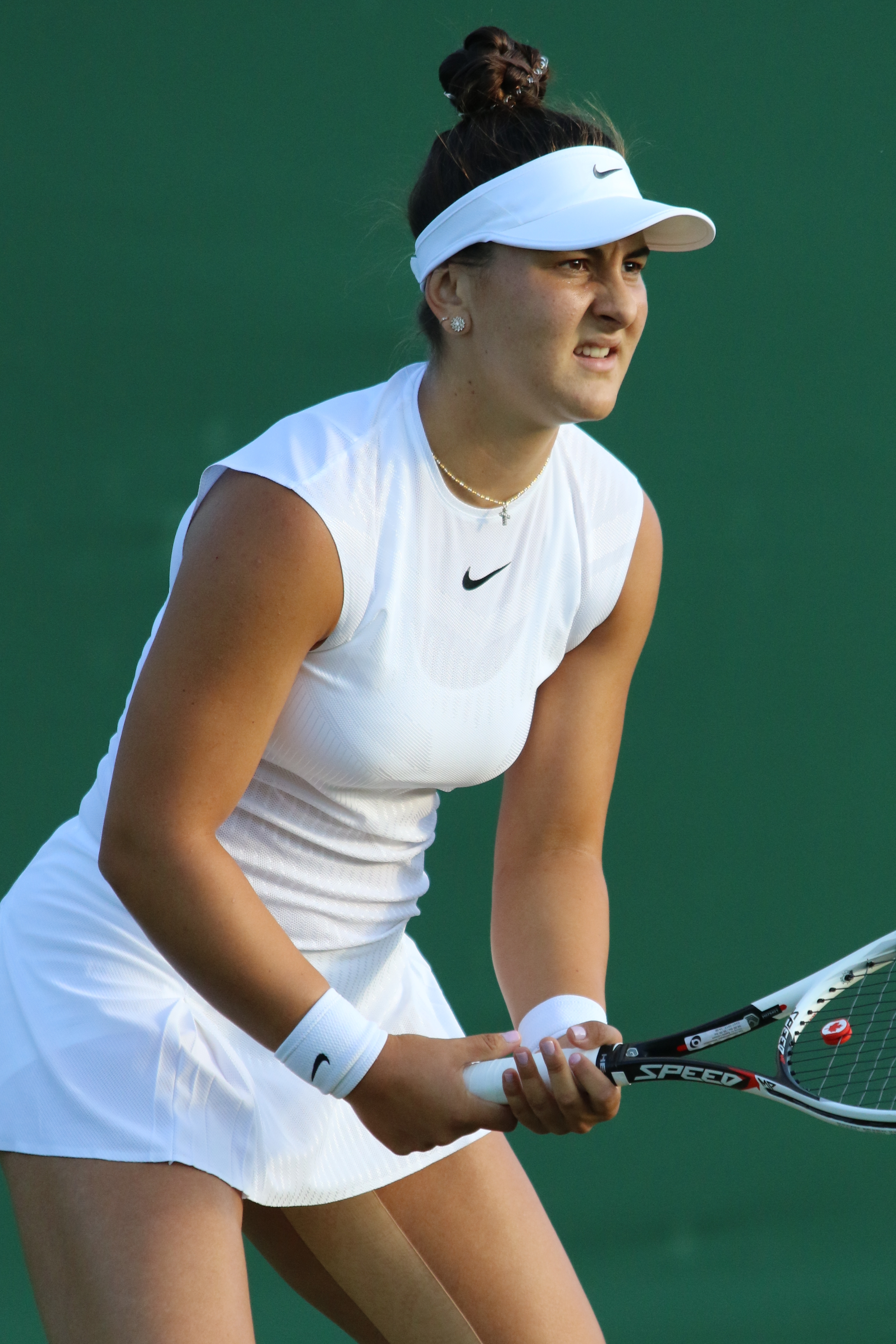
Bianca Andreescu

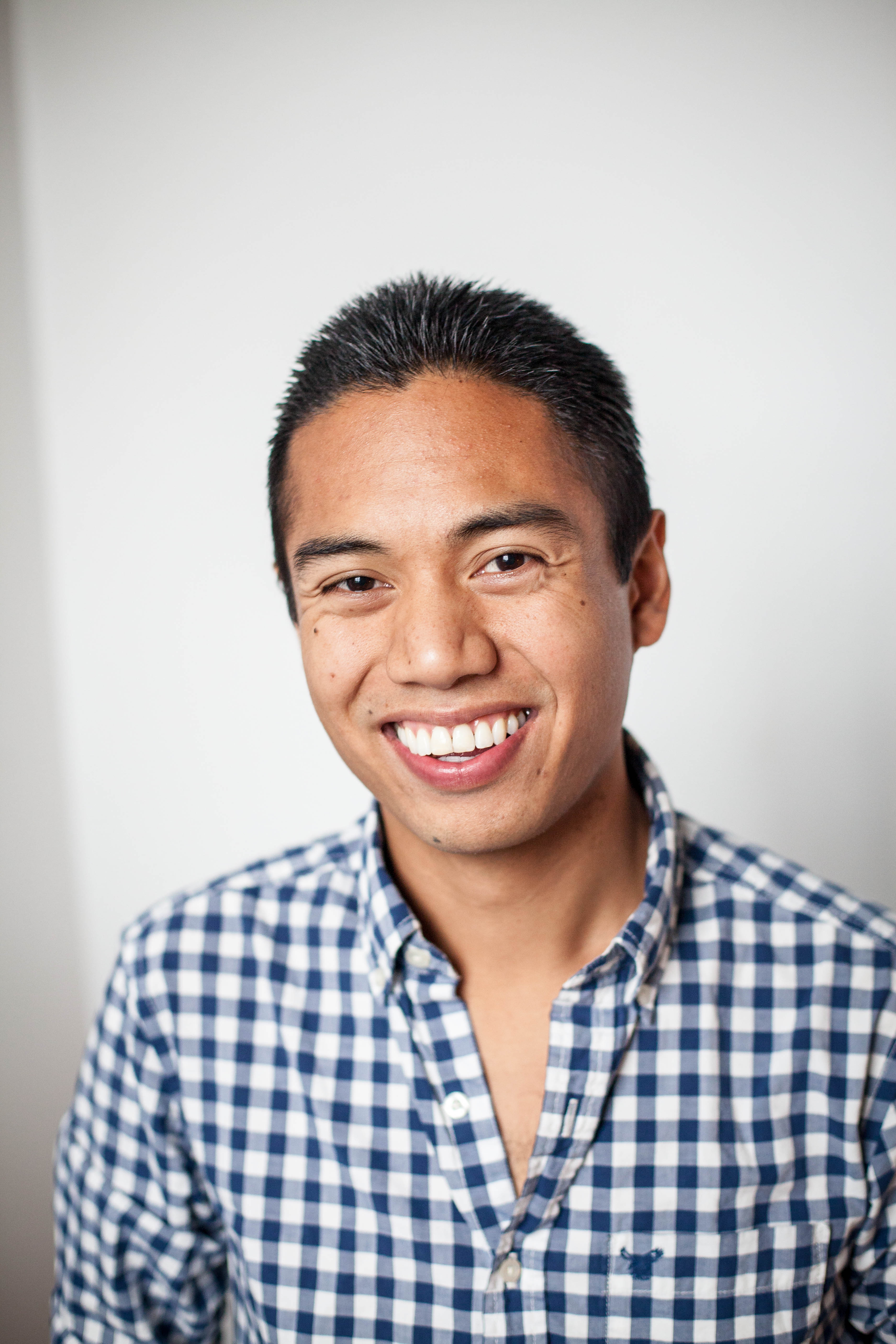
Adrian Anantawan

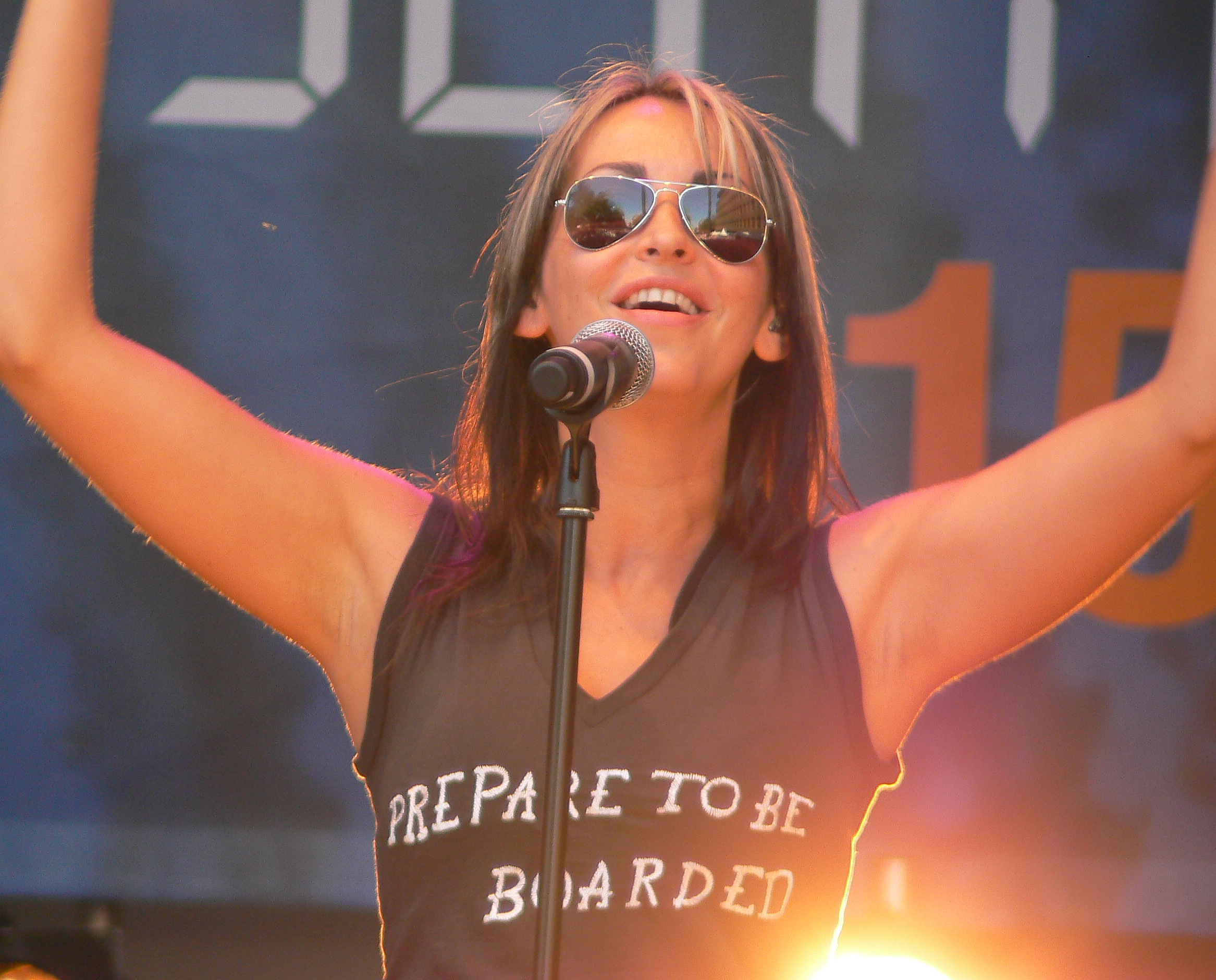
Natalie Appleton
- Tariq Abdelhaleem (born 1948), Egyptian Islamist cleric
- Ibrahim Aboud, suspect, charges dropped
- Carolyn Abraham (born 1968), freelance journalist and author, finalist for the 2002 Governor General's Awards
- Eve Adams (born 1974), politician
- Jeff Adams (born 1970), business person, former Paralympic and Olympic competitor
- Anthony Patrick Cawthra Adamson (1906–2002), heritage planning
- Daniel Adeboboye (born 1999), CFL football player
- Vik Adhopia, CBC Radio reporter
- Natey Adjei (born 1989), CFL football player
- James Cox Aikins (1823–1904), federal politician, lieutenant governor of Manitoba
- Kate Aitken (1891–1971), broadcaster and homemaking expert
- Omar Alghabra (born 1969), federal politician
- Elyse Allan (born 1956 or 1957), C.M., M.B.A., LL.D. (Hon.), president and CEO of GE Canada, champion of scientific literacy, particularly among girls
- Amanda Allen (born 2005), League1 Ontario soccer player
- Bobby Allen (born 1969), retired basketball player
- Charles Allen (born 1977), athlete
- Stella Ambler (born 1966), federal politician
- Laeticia Amihere (born 2001), basketball player, Olympian
- Greg Anaka (died 1976), C.M., minor hockey organizer
- Deepak Anand, MPP Mississauga-Malton
- Adrian Anantawan (born 1983), violinist
- Anders (born c. 1995 or 1996), R&B singer and songwriter
- Bianca Andreescu (born 2000), tennis player, 2019 US Open winner, first male or female player representing Canada to win a Grand Slam singles title
- Danny Antonucci (born 1957), animator
- Natalie Appleton (born 1973), singer, actress
- Mary Ashun (born 1968), educator, author and researcher
- Larry Attard (born 1951), horse trainer, retired Hall of Fame Champion jockey
- Antwi Atuahene (born 1984), NBLC basketball player
- Anthony Aquino (born 1982), ice hockey player
- Luciano Aquino (born 1985), hockey player, Erste Bank Eishockey Liga
- Cathy Auld (born 1971), curler, skips at Mississaugua Golf & Country Club
- Mona Awad (born 1978), novelist, short story writer

== B ==
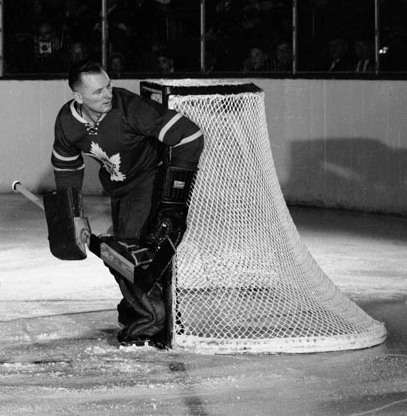
Johnny Bower, ice hockey goalie

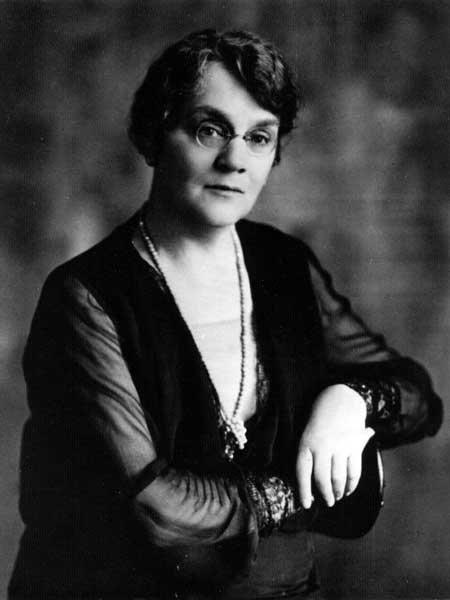
Lillian Beynon Thomas, journalist, feminist

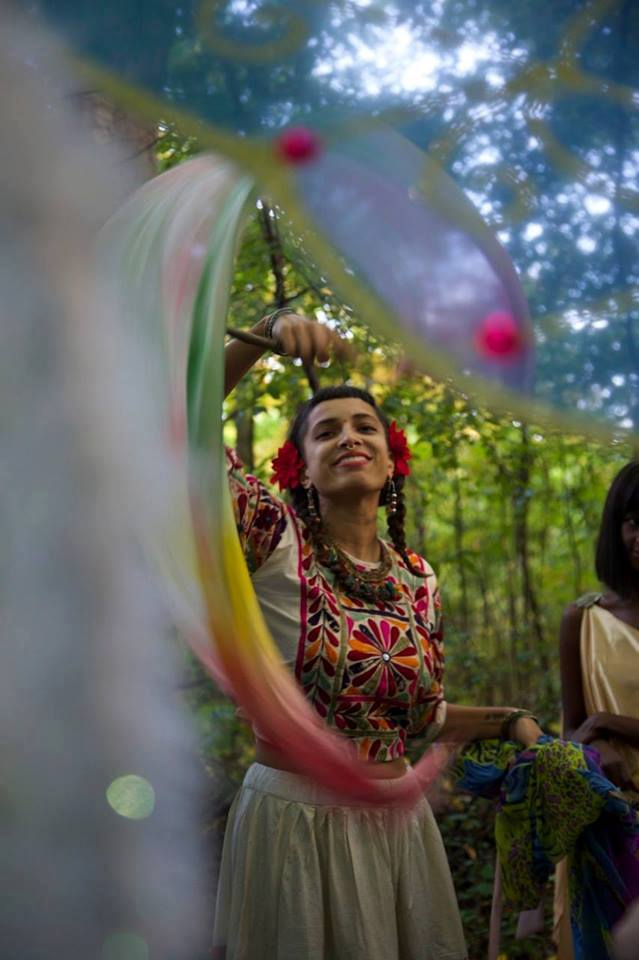
Alysha Brilla, musician

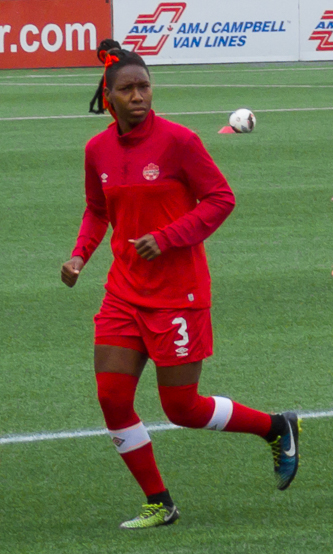
Kadeisha Buchanan, soccer player
- Kelly Babstock (born 1992), Canadian-American NCAA and NWHL ice hockey player
- Amir Bageria (born 2000), actor, Degrassi: The Next Class
- Devon Bailey (born 1991), Canadian Football League football player
- Jasmine Baird (born 1999), snowboarder
- Marika Bakewell (born 1985), curler
- Alyssa Baldin (born 1990), ice hockey player and inline hockey player
- Al Balding (1924–2006), PGA golfer
- Robert W. Ball (1943–2022), yacht designer
- Jill Barber (born 1980), singer-songwriter
- Matthew Barber (born 1977), singer-songwriter
- Clark Barnes (born 2000), CFL football wide receiver
- RJ Barrett (born 2000), NBA basketball player
- Danuta Bartoszek (born 1961), former Olympic marathon runner
- Evert Bastet (born 1950), sailing
- Matt Beca (born 1986), EIHL ice hockey player
- Marko Bedenikovic (born 1984), former soccer player
- Adriano Belli (born 1977), food processing businessperson, former CFL and NFL football player
- Katrina Bellio (born 2004), freestyle swimmer, Olympian
- Sophie Bennett (born 1989), actress (Saddle Club seasons 1 & 2)
- Craig Bernard, film director and producer
- Francis Marion Beynon (1884–1951), journalist, feminist, pacifist
- Lillian Beynon Thomas (1884–1961), journalist, feminist
- Dylan Bibic (born 2003), 2024 professional road and track cyclist, Olympian
- Jack Bickell (1884–1951), businessman, philanthropist, and sports team owner
- Don Biederman (1940–1999), stock car racer
- Don Biggs (born 1965), retired NHL ice hockey player
- Arek Bigos (born 1973), former CFL placekicker football player
- Leading Seaman Robert Binder MB (1989–2010), Canadian Forces Naval Reserve, posthumously awarded the Medal of Bravery
- Art Binkowski (born 1975), super heavyweight boxer
- Courtney Birchard (born 1989), Canadian national ice hockey player
- David Blackwood (1941– 2022), printmaker, artist in residence at the University of Toronto's Erindale College (1969–1975)
- Fito Blanko, Panamanian-Canadian singer/songwriter
- Michelle Bonello (born 1985), ice hockey player and inline hockey player
- Robert Boskovic (born 1998), USL soccer player
- Jaime Bourbonnais (born 1998), ice hockey player
- Johnny Bower (1924–2017), Hockey Hall of Fame goalie for the NHL Toronto Maple Leafs
- Ward Bowlby (1834–1917), lawyer and politician
- Cory Boyd (born 1985), CFL football player
- Brad Boyes (born 1982), NHL player
- Harold M. Brathwaite (1940–2020), O Ont., education
- Jahron Brathwaite (born 1993), singer and songwriter
- Juwan Brescacin (born 1993), CFL football player
- Brandon Bridge (born 1992), CFL football player
- William Briggs (1836–1922), Methodist minister and publisher
- Alysha Brilla (born 1988), Tanzanian-Canadian blues and jazz singer
- Dejon Brissett (born 1996), CFL football player
- Oshae Brissett (born 1998), Israeli Basketball Premier League, former NBA, basketball player
- David Broll (born 1993), ECHL ice hockey player
- Dillon Brooks (born 1996), NBA basketball player
- Andre Brown (born 1990), volleyball player
- Jeff Brown (born 1978), ice hockey player
- Kevin Brown (born 1974), ice hockey player
- Patrick Brown (born 1978), former leader of the Progressive Conservative Party of Ontario, former MPP for Simcoe North
- Gord Brydson (1907–2001), NHL ice hockey player
- Dan Bryk (born 1970), singer-songerwriter
- Kadeisha Buchanan (born 1995), soccer player
- Leya Buchanan (born 1996), track and field sprinter
- Francis (Frank) C. Buckley, C.M., B.Comm. (1921–2016), businessperson
- Attila Buday (born 1974), Olympic sprint canoer
- Tamas Buday Jr. (born 1976), Olympic C-2 canoer
- Mike Bullard (1957–2024), comedian, radio and television personality
- Pat Bullard (born 1959), Canadian-American writer and comedian
- Tony Burgess (born 1959), novelist and screenwriter
- Jacqueline Byers (born 1996), actress

== C ==
- Marcus Caldeira (born 2004), professional soccer player
- Katrina Cameron (born 1995), Olympic rhythmic gymnast
- Tiffany Cameron (born 1991), soccer player, German Bundesliga and Canada women's national soccer team
- Ivan Camilleri (born 1969), Maltese-Canadian Catholic priest, auxiliary bishop–elect of the Archdiocese of Toronto
- Morgan Campbell (born 1976), sportswriter, memoirist
- Nikki Campbell (born 1980), golfer
- Kyle Capobianco (born 1997), AHL ice hockey player
- Alessia Cara (born 1996), singer and songwriter
- Anthony Carelli (born 1974), professional wrestler, competes as Santino Marella for Impact Wrestling and formerly World Wrestling Entertainment
- Jacob Carlos (born 2001), CPL soccer player
- Gordon Carton (1921-2017), former MPP
- Michael Caruso (born 1988), EBEL ice hockey player
- Claire Carver-Dias (born 1977), synchronized swimmer
- Jack Cassar (born 1997), CFL football player
- Sebastian Castello (born 2003), CPL soccer player
- Jennifer Castle, folk singer-songwriter
- Mabel Cawthra (1871–1943), painter, decorator
- Klaidi Cela (born 1999), soccer player
- David Celia, musician
- Carlton Chambers (born 1975), track and field athlete
- Samantha Chang (born 2000), soccer player
- Hyliard Chappell (1916–1988), politician, MP and councillor
- Al Cherney (1932–1989), fiddle player
- Don Cherry (born 1934), hockey commentator
- Kenneth Chisholm (1829–1906), businessman, MPP
- Deborah Chow, filmmaker, director, screenwriter
- Casey Cizikas (born 1991), hockey player for the New York Islanders
- Lou Clare (1950–2017), CFL football player
- Adrian Clarke (born 1991), CFL football linebacker
- Dameon Clarke (born 1972), actor, voice actor
- William "Buffalo Bill" Cody (1846 – 1917), American soldier, bison hunter and showman
- Paul Coffey (born 1961), Hockey Hall of Fame inductee and hockey great
- Enzo Concina (born 1962), retired soccer player
- Kate Conway (born 1986), actress
- Nesta Cooper (born 1993), actress
- Chris Corbeil (born 1988), NLL lacrosse player
- Matt Corrente (born 1988), hockey player for the New Jersey Devils
- Peter deCarteret Cory, CC QC (1925–2020), former puisne judge of the Supreme Court of Canada (1989 to 1999)
- Anthony Cosmo (born 1977), NLL goaltender for the Boston Blazers
- Jesse Costa (born 2005), soccer player
- John Coyne (1836–1873), barrister, MPP
- Dominic Cozzolino (born 1994), sledge ice hockey
- Stephen Crawford, MPP for Oakville
- Brittany Crew (born 1994), shot put athlete
- Bonnie Crombie (born 1960), politician
- Kyle Croxall (born 1988), 2012 Crashed Ice world champion
- Gord Cruickshank (1965–2021), NCAA ice hockey forward, NHL drafted
- Bob Cunningham (1927–2006), CFL football fullback
- Rudy Cuzzetto, MPP for Mississauga-Lakeshore

== D ==
- Robin D'Abreo (born 1975), field hockey player
- Chris D'Alvise (born 1986), EBEL ice hockey player
- Kunle Dada-Luke (born 2000), soccer player
- André Dae Kim (born 1996), actor and writer
- Dipika Damerla, MPP for Mississauga East—Cooksville
- Fedir Danylak (born 1955), dancer, balletmaster, choreographer and artistic director
- Mackenzie Darragh (born 1993), Olympic swimmer
- James Day (born 1946), equestrian jumping
- Bob Dechert, politician
- Vincenzo DeMaria (born 1954), mob boss, Siderno Group
- Peter Demeter (born 1933), murderer, former real estate developer
- Shawn Desman (born 1982, as Shawn Bosco Fernandes), singer and entertainer
- Ranjeev Deol (born 1976), field hockey
- Duncan R. Derry (died 1987), O.C., Ph.D., F.R.S.C., economic geologist
- Jamie Devane (born 1991), NHL drafted AHL player
- Sudarshan Devanesen (born 1943), C.M., M.D., former Chief of Family and Community Medicine at St. Michael's Hospital in Toronto
- Devon (born c. 1963, Devon Martin), rapper
- Columbia "Coco" Diaz (1953–2018), Filipino activist for domestic workers and caregivers
- Jessica DiGirolamo (born 1999), PWHL ice hockey defence
- Dylan Di Perna (born 1996), ICEHL ice hockey defenceman
- Adrian Dingle (1911–1974), cartoonist and artist, best known for creating Nelvana of the Northern Lights
- Anne Ditchburn (born 1949), ballet dancer and choreographer, actress
- Martin Dobkin (born 1942), mayor of Mississauga, family doctor
- Denny Doherty (1940–2007), member of The Mamas & the Papas, moved to Park Royal in 1986 to live and work, later Lorne Park
- Manning Doherty (1875–1938), Ontario Minister of Agriculture
- Richard Dos Ramos (born 1962), jockey in Thoroughbred horse racing
- Jennifer Douglas (born 1974), archivist
- Dick Duff (born 1936), former professional hockey player, and Hockey Hall of Fame inductee
- Vince Dunn (born 1996), NHL hockey player
- Jordan Dunstan (born 1993), soccer player
- Andre Durie (born 1981), CFL football player, slotback, Jake Gaudaur Veterans' Award
- Sean Durzi (born 1998), NHL ice hockey defenseman

== E ==
.

- Chuck Ealey (born 1950), former CFL football player
- Robert Young Eaton (1875–1956), businessman
- Dwight Edwards (born 1954), retired CFL football player
- Marvin Elkind (1934–2024), gangster, boxer, police informer, chauffeur to Jimmy Hoffa
- William Elliott (1837–1888), member of Parliament, farmer, merchant
- Rik Emmett (born 1953), musician
- JD Era (born 1985), rapper

== F ==
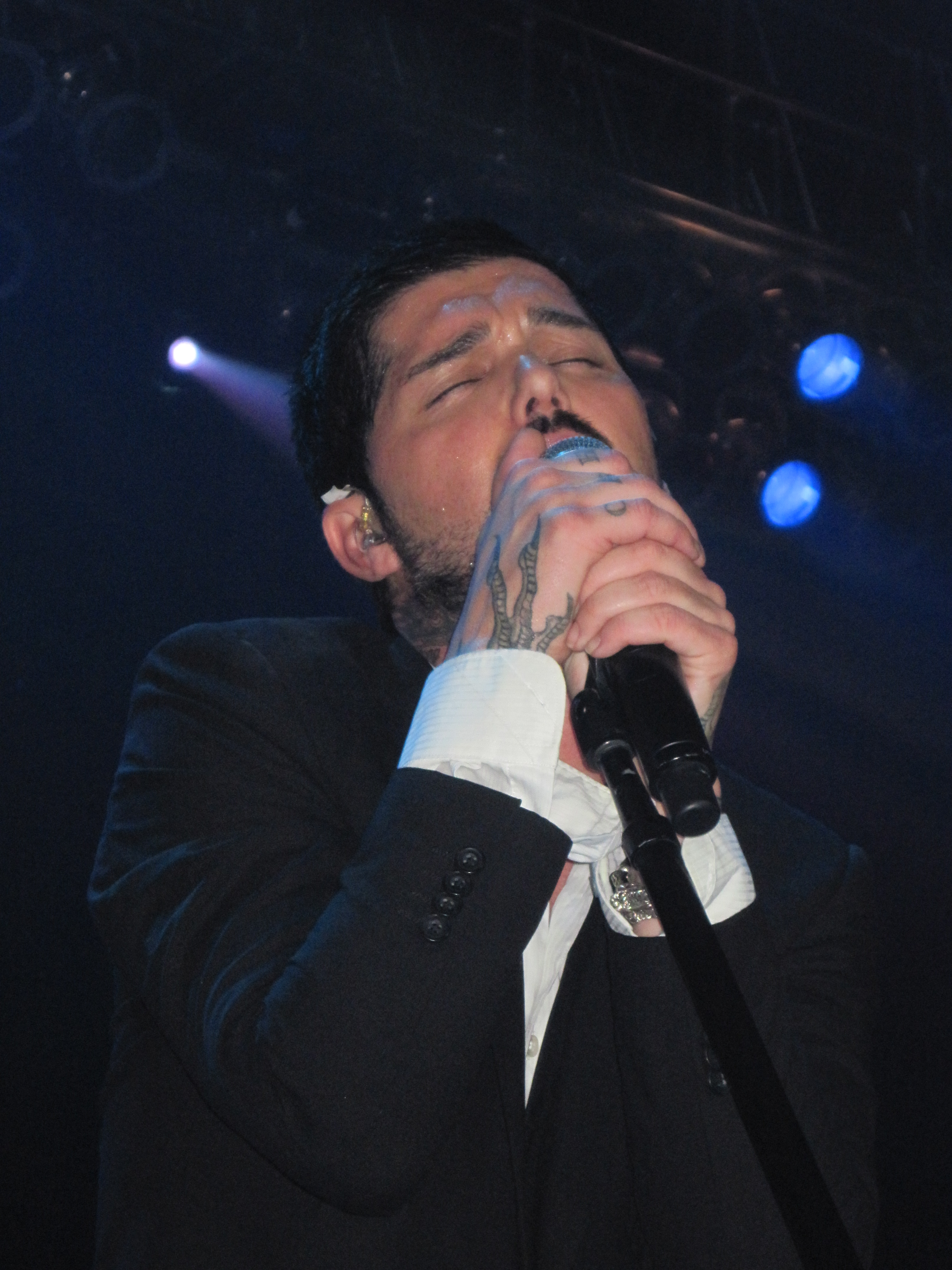
J. D. Fortune

- Robby Fabbri (born 1996), ice hockey player, currently with the St. Louis Blues
- Darrell Faria, actor, director, comedian
- Joseph Featherston (1843–1913), member of Parliament, municipal politician, livestock association board member, farmer
- Ron Fellows (born 1959), NASCAR driver
- Wayne Fernandes (born 1978), field hockey
- Juan Ramon Fernandez (1956–2013), Spanish gangster active in Canada
- Yanga R. Fernández (born 1971), astronomer
- Ricardo Ferreira (born 1992), Primeira Liga football player
- Massimo Ferrin (born 1998), USL Championship soccer player
- Jonelle Filigno (born 1990), soccer player, Olympics and National Women's Soccer League
- Caleb Flaxey (born 1983), curler, 2014 Sochi Olympic alternate; Caledon resident, his rink is Dixie Curling Club
- James C. Floyd (born 1914), aerospace engineer, Avro Aircraft Ltd. (Canada) chief design engineer
- Renee Foessel (born 1995), parasport discus throw athlete
- Peter Fonseca (born 1966), politician
- Kyle Forgeard (born 1994), YouTuber
- J.D. Fortune (born 1973), musician, former frontman of INXS
- Magdalena Frąckowiak (born 1984), Polish fashion model and jewelry designer
- Giuliano Frano (born 1993), USL soccer player
- Paul Fromm (born 1949), white supremacist

== G ==
- William James Gage (1849–1921), educator, publisher, philanthropist
- Iqwinder Gaheer, member of Parliament
- Amanda Galle (born 1989), professional boxer
- Greg Gardner (born 1975), ice hockey coach (AHA), former goaltender
- Keith Garebian (born 1942), critic, biographer, poet
- Ali Gatie (born 1997), rapper, singer, songwriter
- Jessica Gaudreault (born 1994), water polo player
- Robyn Gayle (born 1985), Olympic soccer player
- Ahmad Ghany (born 1984), alleged terrorist
- Joel Gibb (born 1977), musician
- Brad K. Gibson, astrophysicist, academic
- Greg Gilbert (born 1962), professional ice hockey coach and former player
- John Morrow Godfrey (1912–2001), pilot, lawyer, senator
- Gary Pig Gold (born 1955), singer-songwriter, record producer, filmmaker, author
- Charles Goldhamer (1903–1985), war artist
- Hank Goldup (1918–2008), NHL ice hockey player
- Ana Golja (born 1996), actor, Degrassi
- Cindy Gomez, singer
- Gigi Gorgeous (born 1992), actress, internet personality, makeup artist, activist, and model
- Igor Gouzenko (1919–1982), defected cipher clerk for the Soviet Embassy to Canada
- Arianna Grace (born 1997, as Bianca Sophia Carelli), WWE NXT wrestler
- Robbie G.K. (b. 1996, Robbie Graham-Kuntz), actor, Heated Rivalry
- Gerry Gray (born 1961), soccer coach, former Canadian national team player
- Gordon Graydon (1896–1953), MP and UN representative for Canada
- Jayden Greig (born 2003), actor
- Albina Guarnieri (born 1953), former politician
- Iohan Gueorguiev (1988–2021), long-distance bikepacker

== H ==
- Ntore Habimana (born 1997), CEBL basketball player
- Donald Haddow (born 1970), former Olympic freestyle swimmer
- Michael Hage (born 2006), USHL ice hockey centre
- Tariq Abdul Haleem, Egyptian Islamist cleric, praised by the leader of Al-Qaeda
- Sherman Hamilton (born 1972), basketball player, television personality, raised in Malton
- Ken Hammond (born 1963), former NHL ice hockey player
- Melvin Ormond Hammond (1876–1934), journalist and photographer
- Macklin Leslie Hancock (1925–2010), O Ont, urban planning
- Basil (Buzz) Hargrove (born 1944), O.C., LL.D., former president of the Canadian Auto Workers union
- Winnie Harlow (born 1994), model
- Glen Harmon (1921–2007), NHL ice hockey player
- Richard Harmon (born 1991), actor
- Jacqueline Harrison (born 1978), curler
- Daniel Harper (born 1989), track and field
- Raye Hartmann (born 1990), CFL football player
- Vanessa Harwood (born 1947), ballet dancer, choreographer, artistic director, teacher, and actor
- Farhat Hashmi (born 1957), Islamic scholar, founder of Mississauga's Al-Huda Institute
- Ronnie Hawkins, O.C. (1935-2022), rockabilly musician
- Sandy Hawley (born 1949), jockey
- Daniel Hayes (born 1989), actor, boxer, MMA fighter
- Paul Henderson (born 1943), C.M., O.Ont., former NHL ice hockey player, motivational speaker, volunteer
- Kyle Hergel (born 1999), NFL football player
- Curtis Hibbert (born 1966), stuntman, Olympic gymnast
- Blair Hicken (born 1965), Olympic swimmer
- Allison Higson (born 1973), Olympic swimmer
- Dwayne Hill (born 1966), voice actor
- Shawn Hill (born 1981), baseball player
- Charles Hill-Tout (1858–1944), ethnologist and folklorist
- Dave Hilton, Jr. (born 1963), former world boxing champion
- Vincent Ho (born 1993), Member of Parliament for Richmond Hill South, former corporate lawyer
- Flash Hollett (1911–1999), ice hockey player
- Karla Homolka (born 1970), notable rapist and serial killer
- Ed Hospodar (born 1959), former ice hockey player
- Samantha Holmes-Domagala (born 1977), ice hockey player
- Jonathan Hood (born 1985), CFL football defensive back
- Robert Horner (1932–2008), member of Parliament for Mississauga North
- Yi-Jia Susanne Hou (born 1977), violinist
- Caleb Houstan (born 2003), NBA drafted basketball player
- Malcolm Howard (born 1983), Olympic rower
- William Pearce Howland (1811–1907), second lieutenant governor of Ontario
- Danielle Husar (born 2001), field hockey player
- Darrin Huss (born 1965), singer
- Hyeon Soo Lim (born 1955), pastor previously imprisoned by North Korea

== I ==
- Freddy Ibrahim (born 1996), basketball player, Jordanian national basketball team
- IllScarlett members
- Thomas Ingersoll (1749–1812), justice of the peace, hotel operator, father of Laura Secord
- Michael Ireland (born 1974), Olympic long track speed skater
- Sean Ireland (born 1969), speed skating coach, former Olympic speed skater
- Zunera Ishaq (born c. 1986), successfully challenged a law requiring people taking the Oath of Citizenship to have their identity visible, allowing her to wear a niqab
- Jack Ivankovic (born 2007), ice hockey goaltender, Canadian World Junior Ice Hockey Championships, NHL drafted

== J ==
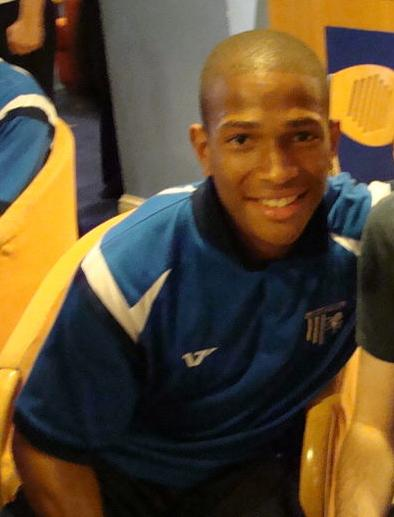
Simeon Jackson, soccer player

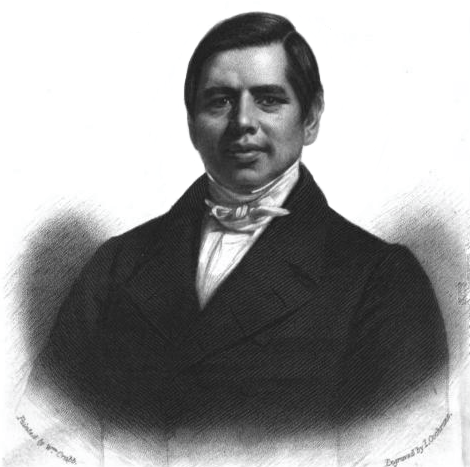
Peter Jones (Kahkewāquonāby), Ojibwa Methodist minister
- Chuck Jackson (born 1953), lead singer, Downchild Blues Band
- Simeon Jackson (born 1987), footballer
- Ian James (born 1963), retired Olympic long jumper
- Ryan Lee James (born 1994), soccer player
- Stefan Janković (born 1993), basketball player
- Patti Jannetta, pop and rock singer
- Daniel Jodah (born 1995), League1 Ontario and Guyanese national team football player
- Prakash John (born 1947), rock & rhythm 'n blues bassist
- Ryan Johnson (born 1974), freestyle skier
- Isaiah Johnston (born 2001), CPL soccer player
- Kyle Jones (born 1986), retired CFL football player
- Peter Jones (1802–1856), Ojibwa Methodist minister, translator, chief and author
- Terry David Jones (1938–2014), MPP
- Leila Josefowicz (born 1977), violinist
- David Joseph, basketball coach
- Bill Joyce (born 1957), IHL ice hockey player
- Sandeep Jyoti (born 1973), cricketer

== K ==
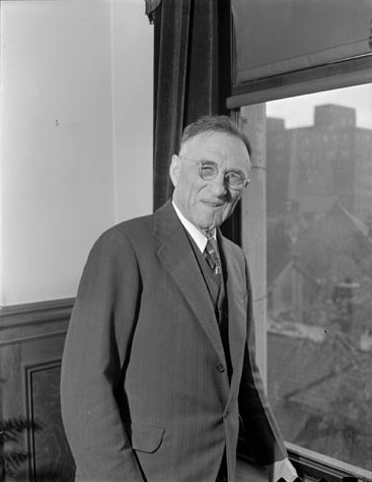
T. L. Kennedy, premier of Ontario

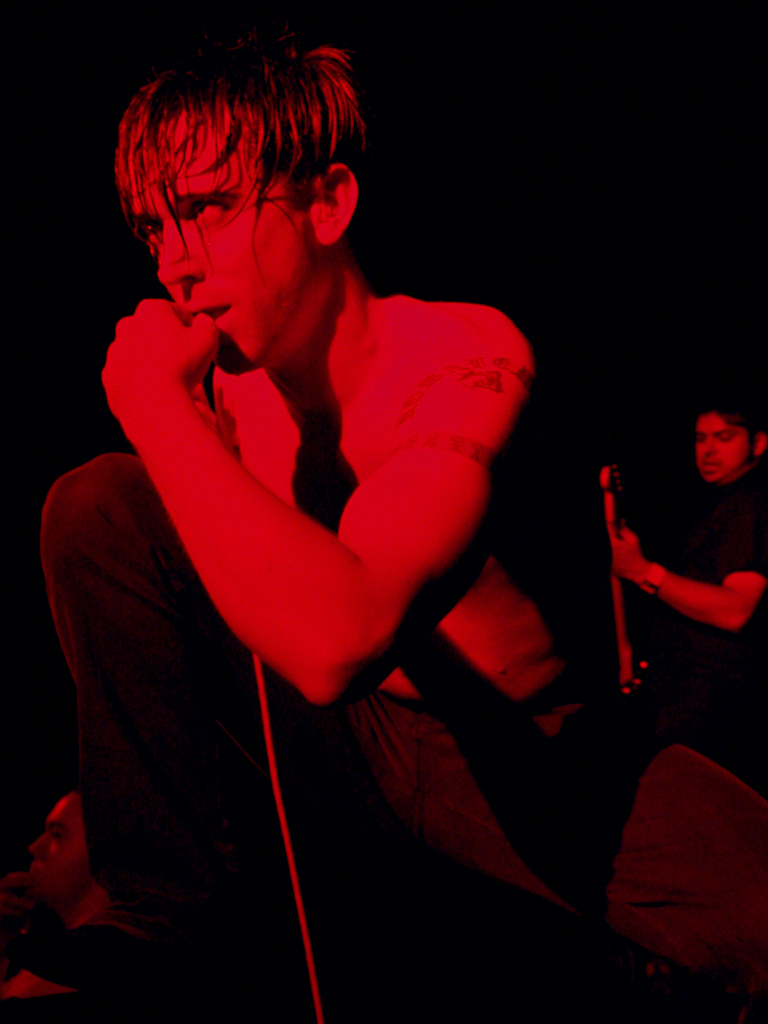
Benjamin Kowalewicz, lead singer, Billy Talent

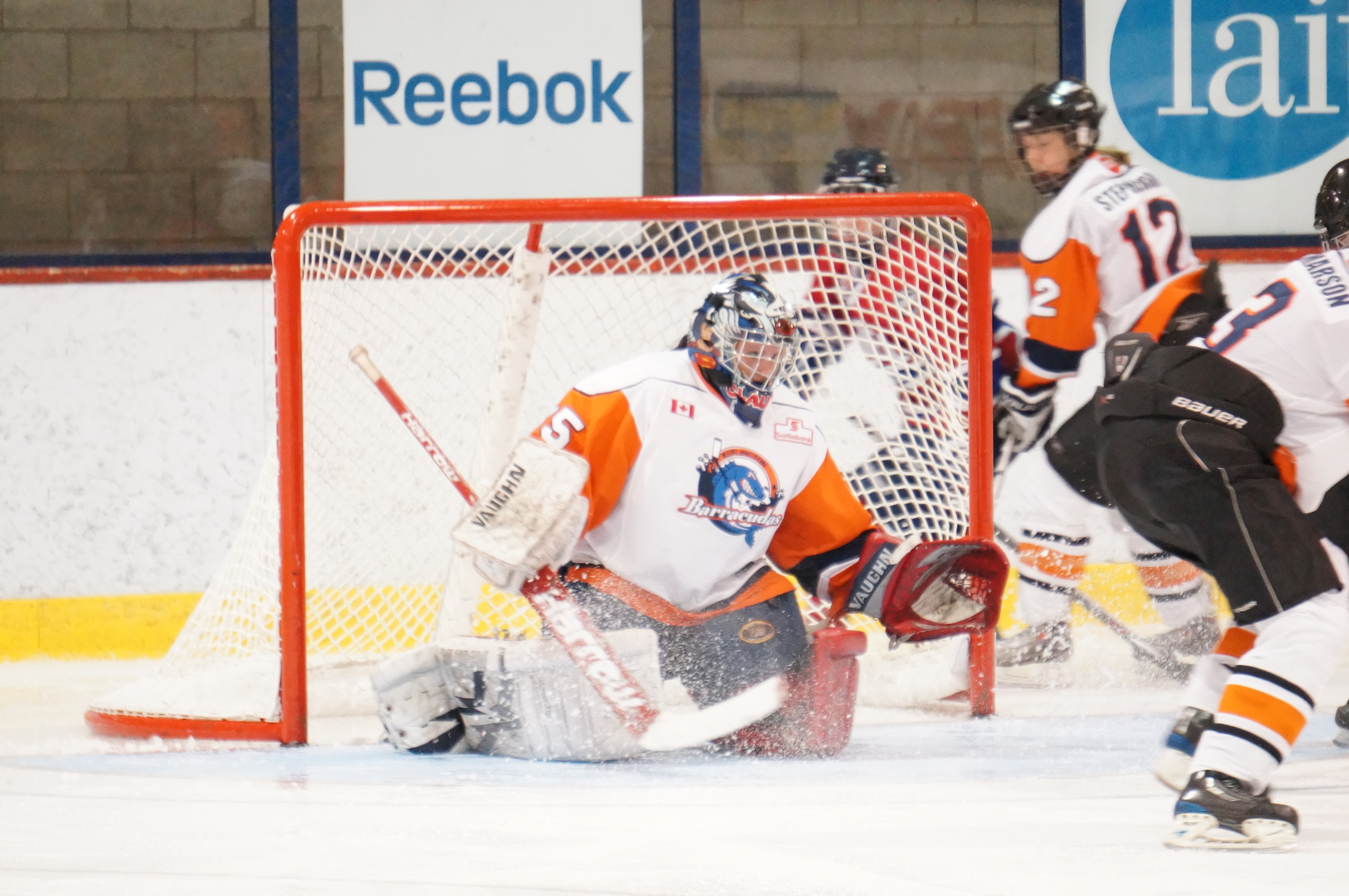
Christina Kessler, ice hockey goalie
- Zarrar Kahn, film director and screenwriter
- Karen Kain (born 1951), CC, lived in Erindale Woodlands and Clarkson while attending the National Ballet School
- Ignat Kaneff (1926–2020), O Ont, developer and philanthropist
- Belinda Karahalios (born 1982), MPP for Cambridge
- Brittany Kassil (born 1991), rugby union player
- Douglas Kennedy (1916–2003), provincial politician
- Peter Kennedy (1943–2010), economist
- Thomas Laird Kennedy (1878–1959), politician, premier of Ontario
- Jane Kerr (bornf 1968), Olympic swimmer
- Christina Kessler (born 1988), ice hockey player
- Iqra Khalid (born 1986), MP
- Irshad Khan (born c. 1964), Indian classical surbahar and sitar player
- Rich Kidd (born 1987), hip hop recording artist, record producer and film/video director, 2012 Juno Award nominee
- Deanna Klymkiw, clinical psychologist, former actress
- Dean Kondziolka (born 1972), swimmer
- Nicole Kosta (born 1993), PWHL ice hockey player
- Tom Kostopoulos (born 1979), ice hockey player
- Greg Kovacs (1968–2013), bodybuilder
- Maksym Kowal (born 1991), soccer player
- Benjamin Kowalewicz (born 1975), lead singer of Billy Talent
- Alison Kreviazuk (born 1988), curler
- Matt Kudu (born 1981), football player
- Nikolai Kulikovsky (1881–1958), second husband of Grand Duchess Olga Alexandrovna of Russia
- Natalia Kusendova, MPP for Mississauga Centre
- Jeff Kyrzakos (born 1985), hockey player, Central Hockey League

== L ==
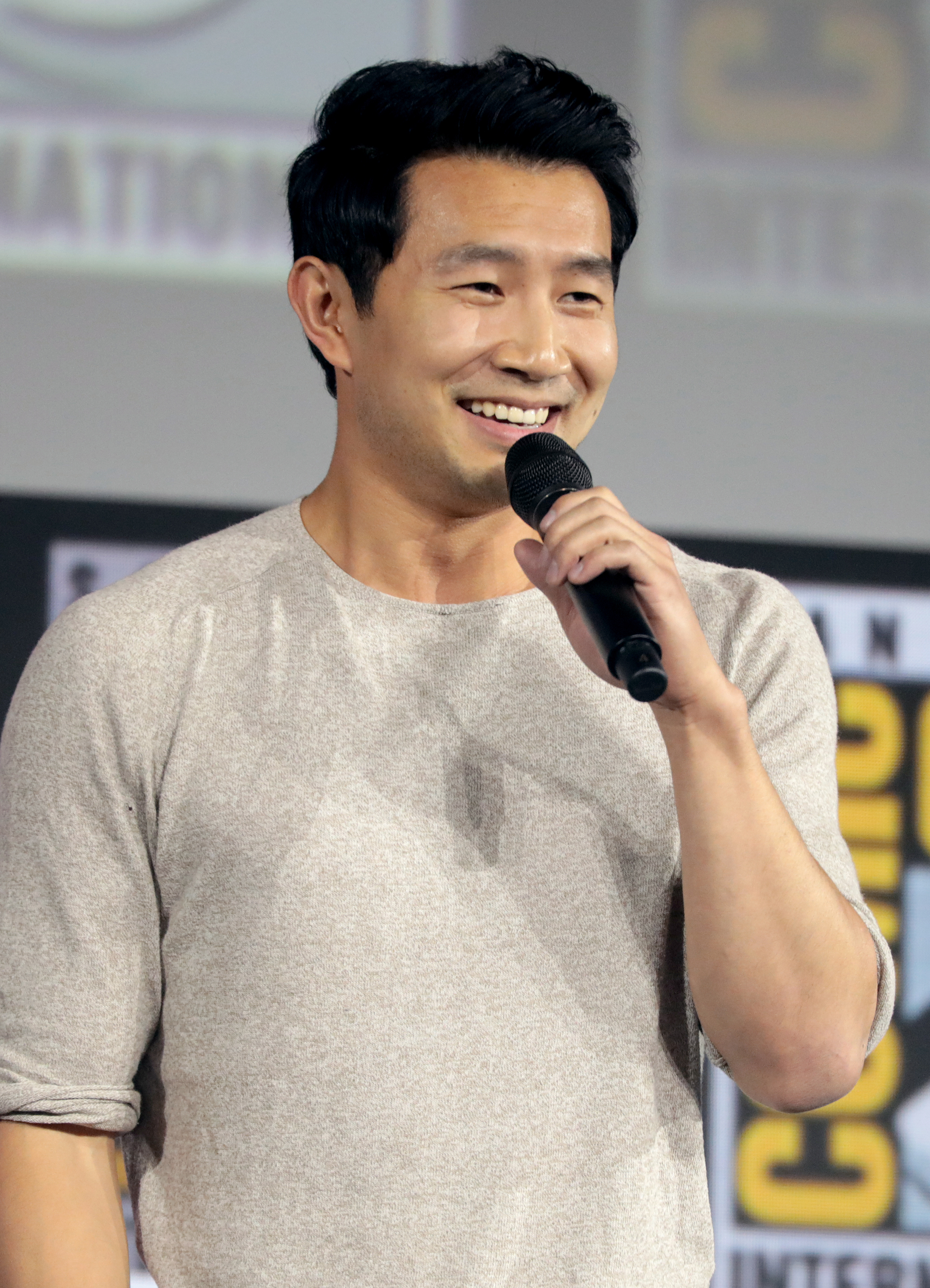
Simu Liu, actor

- Nathan LaFayette (born 1973), former ice hockey player
- Jack LaFontaine (born 1998), NHL drafted ice hockey goalie
- Tuan Lam (born 1966), professional poker player
- John Langstone (1913–1994), Anglican bishop
- Silken Laumann (born 1964), Olympic rower
- Kenneth Law (born 1965), convicted of assisting suicide
- Alison Lee (born 1994), indoor hockey and field hockey player
- Chris Leroux (born 1984), retired baseball player, appearing in The Bachelor Canada
- Adriana Leon (born 1992), soccer player NWSL
- George Leslie Sr. (1804–1893), gardener, merchant, namesake of Toronto's Leslieville
- Janet Leung (born 1994), softball player, Olympian
- Winnie Leuszler (1926–2004), long-distance swimmer
- Jessica Cooper Lewis (born 1993), Bermudian Paralympic athlete
- Carrie Lightbound (born 1979), K-4 500 kayak
- Simu Liu (born 1989), actor, Kim's Convenience and Shang-Chi and the Legend of the Ten Rings
- Władysław Lizoń (born 1954), federal politician
- Erix Logan (born 1963, Enrico Del Buono), magician and illusionist
- Martina Lončar (born 1997), soccer player
- Naz Long (born 1993), college basketball player
- Jason Loo, cartoonist and comics writer
- Anqi Luo (born 1996), table tennis
- Henry Lau (born 1989), k-pop singer, actor

== M ==
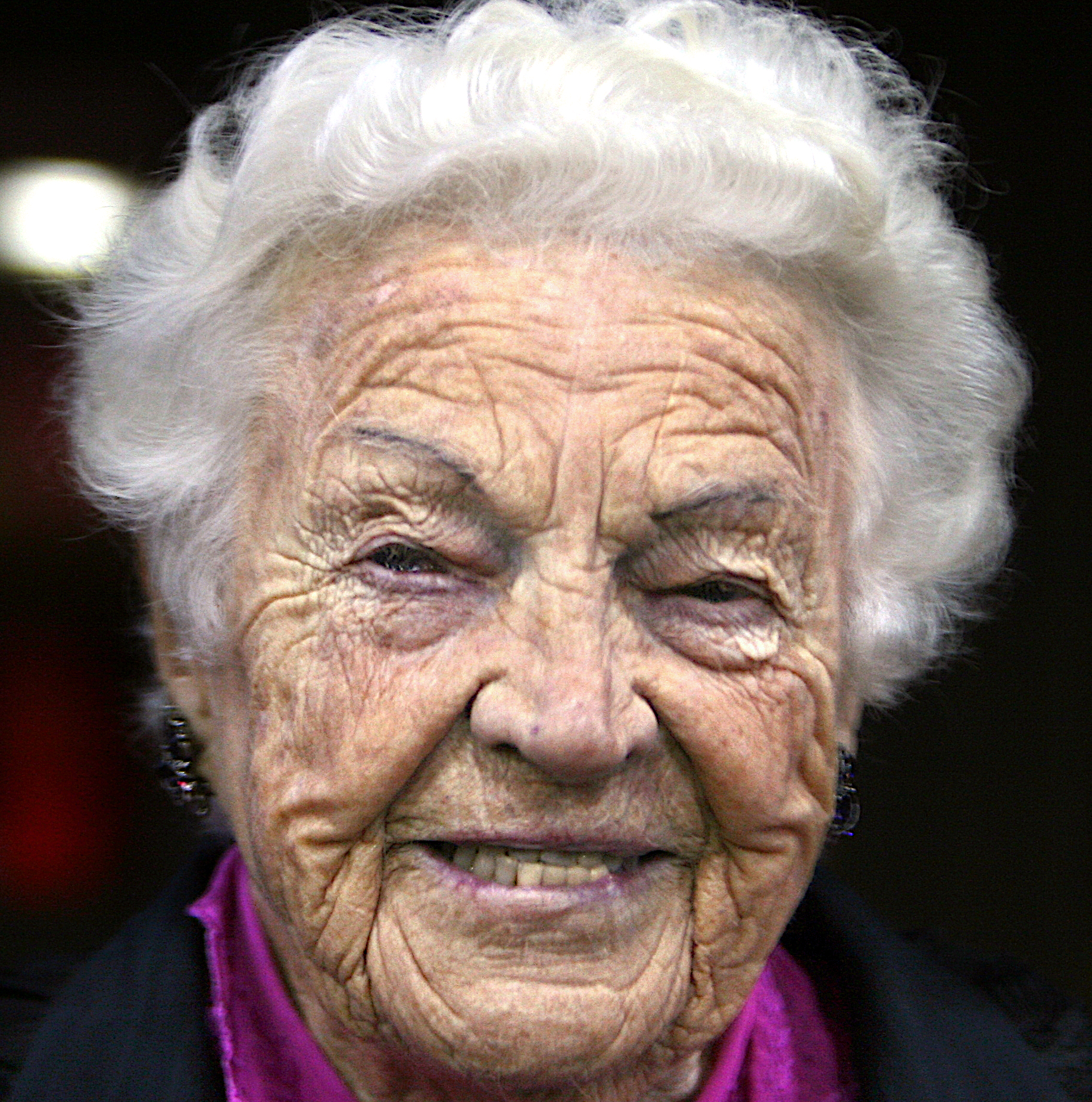
Hazel McCallion

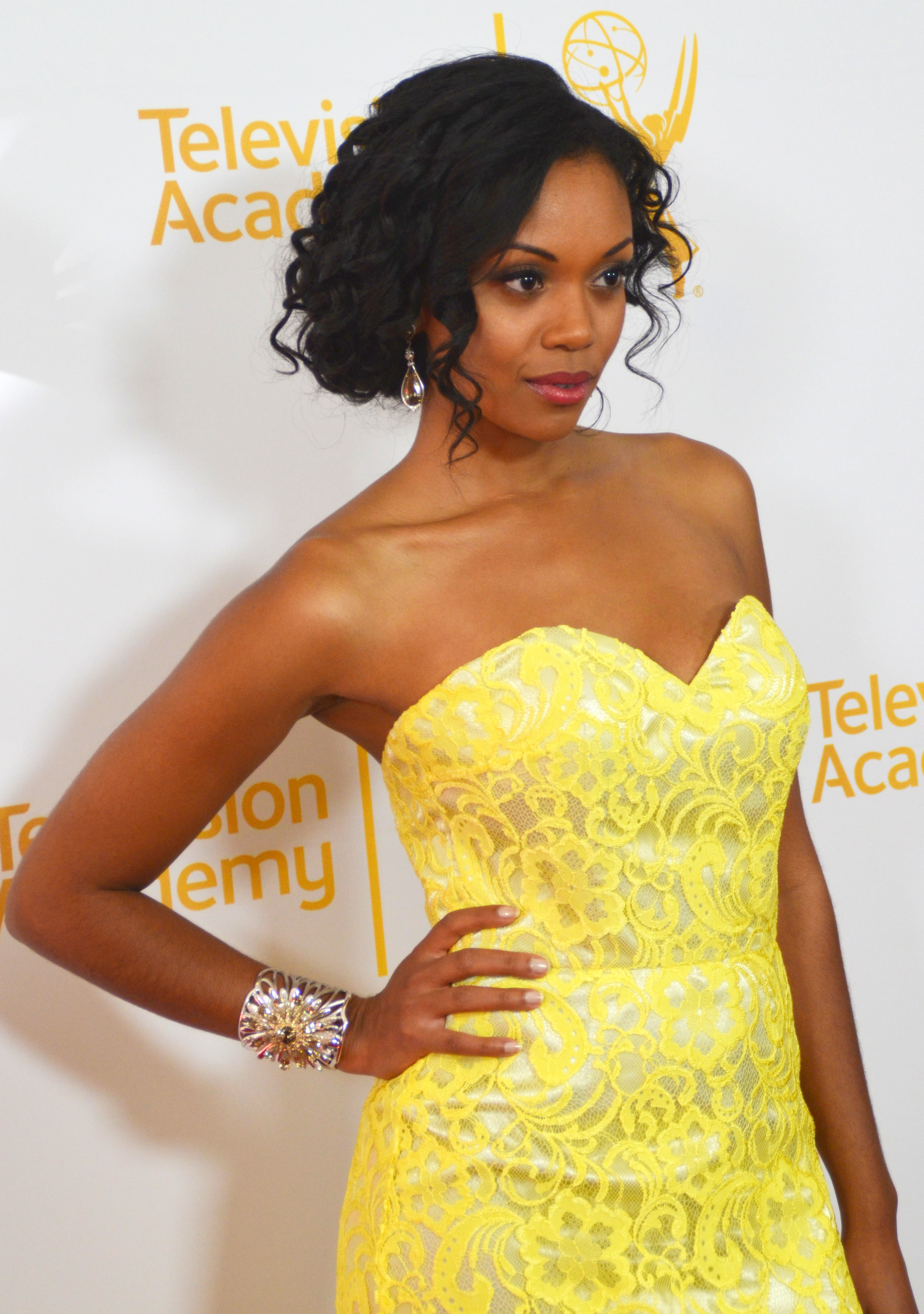
Mishael Morgan

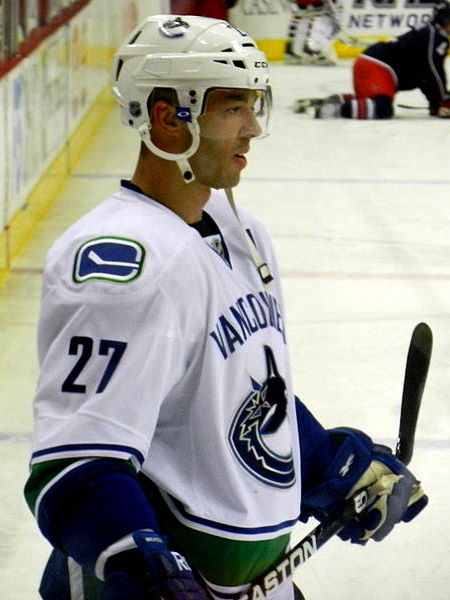
Manny Malhotra

- Austin MacDonald (born 1995), actor, Debra!
- Byron MacDonald (born 1950), swimming coach, broadcaster, former Olympic swimmer
- Dr. Joseph B. MacInnis (born 1937), lived in Mineola as of 1965, physician, author, poet, underwater diver and aquanaut, first scientist to dive under the North Pole
- Robert MacGeorge (1808–1884), 19th-century Anglican priest and author
- Brittany MacLean (born 1994), Olympic swimmer
- Heather MacLean (born 1992), Olympic swimmer
- Spencer MacPherson (born 1997), actor
- Kiana Madeira (born 1992), actor
- Christine Magee (born 1959), OC, businessperson, notably Sleep Country Canada
- Steve Mahoney (born 1947), former MP and cabinet minister, former MPP
- Shaun Majumder (born 1972), comedian, born in Newfoundland, raised in Clarkson
- Matur Maker (born 1998), basketball player declared for the 2018 NBA draft
- Manny Malhotra (born 1980), former hockey player for the Vancouver Canucks
- Ausma Malik (born 1983/1984), Toronto city councillor
- Whitney Mallett, editor, publisher, writer
- A. J. Mandani (born 1987), PBA basketball player
- Alan Mannus (born 1982), soccer goalkeeper
- Denis Margalik (born 1997), Argentine figure skater
- Margaret Marland (born 1934), politician
- Robert Marland (born 1964), realtor, retired Olympic rower
- Grant Marshall (born 1973), retired NHL ice hockey player
- Boman Martinez-Reid (known as Bomanizer), TikTok video creator
- Taya Marquis (born 1989), singer, songwriter
- Liam Massaubi, entrepreneur, business person and investor
- Shahir Massoud, chef and television personality
- Diana Matheson (born 1984), Olympic soccer player
- Joe Mattacchione (born 1975), USL A-League/NPSL soccer player
- Jeff Maund (born 1976), former ice hockey goaltender
- Ermanno Mauro (born 1939), O.C., tenor
- Gavin Maxwell (born 1970), Olympic spring canoe/kayaker
- Hazel McCallion, C.M. (1921–2023), politician, mayor of Mississauga
- Gavin McCallum (born 1987), footballer
- Tom McCarthy (born 1960), NHL ice hockey player
- Joel McClintock (born 1960), former water skier
- Hatem McDadi (born 1960s), former professional tennis player
- Natassha McDonald (born 1997), athlete
- Norris McDonald (born 1942), journalist, member of the Canadian Motorsport Hall of Fame
- Wade McElwain (born 1972), television producer and comedian
- F.B. McFarren (1889–unknown), miller
- Andrew McGrath (born 1998), Australian rules footballer
- Blake McGrath (born 1983), dancer, singer, choreographer
- Seamus McGrath (born 1976), retired mountain biker
- Ruth Gowdy McKinley (1931–1981), ceramic artist
- Margaret McLeod OC (died 1993), founder of Cheshire Homes in Canada
- Michael McLeod (born 1998), OHL ice hockey
- Ryan McLeod (born 1999), NHL ice hockey player
- Mikael McNamara (born 1987), soccer player
- Suzie McNeil (born 1976), singer
- Danica McPhee (born 1989), member of Team Canada at the IPC's first women's sledge hockey tournament
- Richie Mehta, film director, Genie nominee
- Rachel Melhado (born 1992), former soccer player
- Eddie Melo (1960–2001), boxer, gangster
- Ian Mendes (born 1976), sports broadcaster
- Tony Menezes (born 1974), soccer player
- Maya Meschkuleit (born 2001), Canadian Olympic team rower, silver medalist
- Scott Middleton (born 1981), guitarist of Cancer Bats, record producer, engineer
- Christin Milloy (born 1984), LGBT activist
- Nathan Mitchell (born 1988), actor, The Boys
- Shay Mitchell (born 1987), television actress, Pretty Little Liars
- Elijah Mitrou-Long (born 1996), Canadian-Greek basketball player for Hapoel Holon of the Israeli Basketball Premier League
- Naz Mitrou-Long (born 1993), basketball player
- Andrea Mitrovic (born 1999), volleyball player
- Stefan Molyneux (born 1966), author, essayist, philosopher, radio host
- Steve Montador (1979–2015), NHL ice hockey player
- Gil Moore (born 1953), Triumph
- William Moore (born 2007), NCAA ice hockey player, NHL drafted
- Mishael Morgan (born 1986), Trinidadian born actress, The Young and the Restless
- Wesley Morgan (born 1990), actor
- Teddy Morris (1910–1965), Canadian Football Hall of Fame player and coach for the Toronto Argonauts
- Carmelina Moscato (born 1984), Olympic soccer player
- John Errington Moss (born 1940), author
- Ese Mrabure-Ajufo (born 1992), CFL football player
- Cauchy Muamba (born 1987), football player, CFL
- Hénoc Muamba (born 1989), football player, NFL, CFL, Grey Cup winner
- Peter Mueller (born 1951), football player, CFL, and educator
- Ryan Munce (born 1985), NHL drafted ACH ice hockey player
- Will Munro (1975–2010), artist, club promoter, and restaurateur
- Janet Murphy (born 1965), curler
- Jestyn Murphy (born c. 1996), curling skip
- Chic Murray (1914–1984), mayor of the Town of Mississauga
- M. H. Murray (born 1993), writer, director, filmmaker, web series creator
- Alex Mustakas, actor and director, CEO of Drayton Entertainment
- Nadine Muzerall (born 1978), ice hockey player

== N ==
- Nahnebahwequa ("Catherine Bunch"), Ojibwa spokeswoman and Christian missionary, born at Credit River flats
- Alexandra Najarro (born 1993), figure skater, trained at Mississauga Figure Skating Club
- Anthony Nalli (born 1966), TV executive producer, director, show runner, host, and drummer of the band Wicked Truth
- Latif Nasser, researcher, writer, presenter
- Farah Nasser, newscaster
- Avan Nava (born 2000), PBA basketball player
- Bo Naylor (born 2000), baseball catcher
- Josh Naylor (born 1997), baseball player
- Boyd Neel, conductor
- Neenyo (born Sean Seaton), record producer and songwriter
- Walt Neubrand, one of three Keepers of the Cup for the NHL
- Kevin Newman, broadcaster, journalist
- Andrew Nicholson (born 1989), NBA basketball player
- Bert Niosi (1909–1987), bandleader
- Devohn Noronha-Teixeira, field hockey player
- Elyse Null (born 1989, Elyse Hopfner-Hibbs), world-level gymnast

== O ==
- Matthew O'Connor (born 1984), soccer player
- Bev Oda (born 1944), former MP, cabinet minister
- Peanuts O'Flaherty (1918–2008), NHL ice hockey player (1940–1956)
- Victor Oh (born 1949), senator
- Grand Duchess Olga Alexandrovna of Russia (1882–1960), exiled child of Emperor Alexander III of Russia
- Nick Ongenda (born 2000), Israeli Basketball Premier League basketball player
- Tara Oram (born 1984), country music singer, lived in Malton
- Johnny Orlando (born 2003), singer, songwriter, actor, Juno Award nominee, MTV EMA awardee for best Canadian Act
- Philip Orsino (born 1954), O.C., B.A., F.C.A., president and CEO of Masonite International Corporation, volunteer and fundraiser
- Kary Osmond (born 1979), celebrity chef, formerly of CBC's Best Recipes Ever

== P ==
Oscar Peterson

- Lata Pada, C.M., M.A., South Asian dancer, instructor, choreographer
- John Pallett (1921–1985), politician
- Owen Pallett (born 1979), composer, violinist, keyboardist, and vocalist, also known as "Final Fantasy"
- Cyril Everard Palmer (1930–2013), Jamaican writer
- Dominic Panganiban (born 1990), YouTuber and animator
- Alex Pangman (born 1976), jazz singer
- Carolyn Parrish (born 1946), city councillor, former MP
- Aqsa Parvez (1991–2007), murdered by strangulation in "honour killing"
- PartyNextDoor (born 1993), Jahron Anthony Brathwaite, R&B Artist with OVO Sound
- Alan Paterson (1928–1999), British high jumper
- Claude Patrick (born 1980), mixed martial arts fighter
- Nick Paul (born 1995), NHL ice hockey player
- Larry Patey (born 1953), hockey player, NHL, raised in Port Credit
- Jerzy Patoła (1946–2016), Polish footballer
- Joevannie Peart (born 1984), former soccer player
- Erica Peck, stage actress; attended Cawthra's arts program and University of Toronto Mississauga
- Jordyn Pedersen (born 1997), retired artistic gymnast
- Bert Peer (1910–1992), NHL player
- Tina Pereira (born 1982 or 1983), ballet dancer
- Christopher Pellini (born 1984), canoe/kayak sprint
- Tina Pereira (born 1982 or 1983), ballet dancer
- Jackie Perez, video journalist, former Toronto Argonauts cheer captain
- Oscar Peterson CC CQ OOnt (1925–2007), jazz pianist
- Tim Peterson (born 1947), former politician
- Roméo Phillion (1939–2015), served 32 years on a wrongful conviction
- Phil X (born 1966), musician and songwriter
- George C. Pidgeon (1872–1971), Presbyterian and United Church minister
- Steve Pinizzotto (born 1984), ice hockey player
- Igor Pisanjuk (born 1989), soccer player
- Ed Podivinsky (born 1970), alpine skiing
- Dalton Pompey (born 1992), baseball, outfielder
- Kyle Porter (born 1990), USL soccer player
- Owen Power (born 2002), NHL ice hockey player
- E. J. Pratt (1882–1964), poet, served in Streetsville as an assistant minister
- Carlo Guillermo Proto (born 1979), Chilean-Canadian director
- Julia Pulo (born 2001), actress and singer

== Q ==
- Maria Qamar, artist and author

== R ==
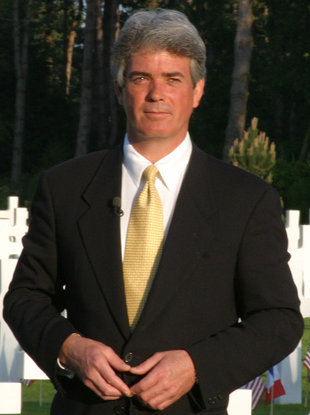
John Roberts

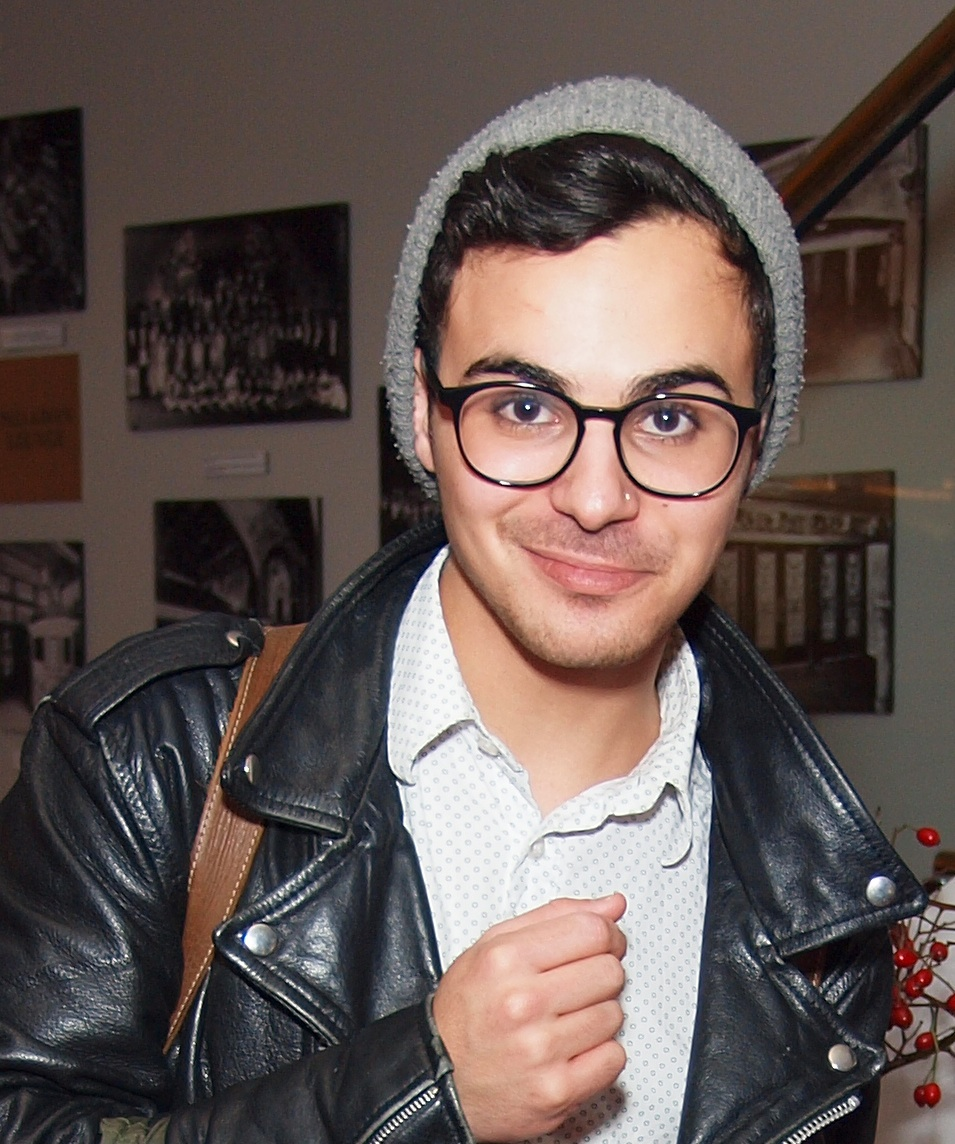
Adamo Ruggiero

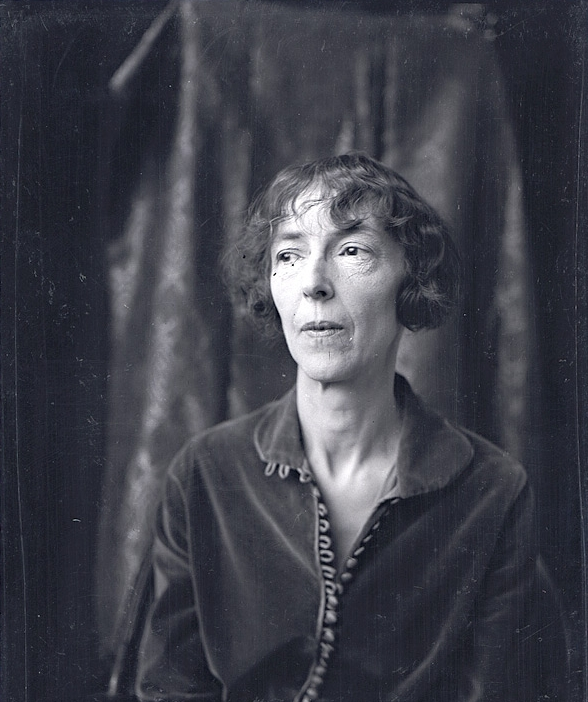
Mazo de la Roche

- Tomasz Radzinski (born 1973), retired soccer player
- Deborah Raji, computer scientist
- John Ramage (born 1991), ice hockey player
- Maitreyi Ramakrishnan (born 2001), actress
- Jayson Rampersad (born 2003), artistic gymnast
- Sohail Rana (born 1938), composer for Pakistani films, runs a music school
- Kaleed Rasheed, MPP for Mississauga East-Cooksville
- Gino Reda (born 1960), television host
- Lesley Reddon (born 1970), former member of the Canadian women's ice hockey team
- Carolyn Relf, geologist
- Margaret Renwick (1923–2012), MPP Scarborough Centre
- Mike Reynolds (1963–1991), MISL soccer player
- Tyrell Richards (born 1998), CFL football linebacker
- Fran Rider, C.M., co-founder of the Ontario Women's Hockey Association
- John River (born 1994, as Matthew John Derrick-Huie), rapper
- Rebecca Rivera (born 1995), volleyball player
- John Roberts (born 1965), TV journalist, formerly known as J. D. Roberts
- John Beverley Robinson (1821–1896), mayor of Toronto, MP, lieutenant governor of Ontario
- Laura Robinson, sports journalist
- Mat Robson (born 1996), EIHL ice hockey goaltender
- Mazo de la Roche (1879–1961), author
- Landan Rooney (born 2002), curler, Canadian Junior Champion skip
- Chaim Roserie (born 1998), soccer player
- Chris Rudge (born 1945), Toronto Argonauts executive, formerly with Canadian Olympic Committee, CFL
- Adamo Ruggiero (born 1986), actor
- Lorne Ryder (born 1970), singer-songwriter and instrumentalist

== S ==
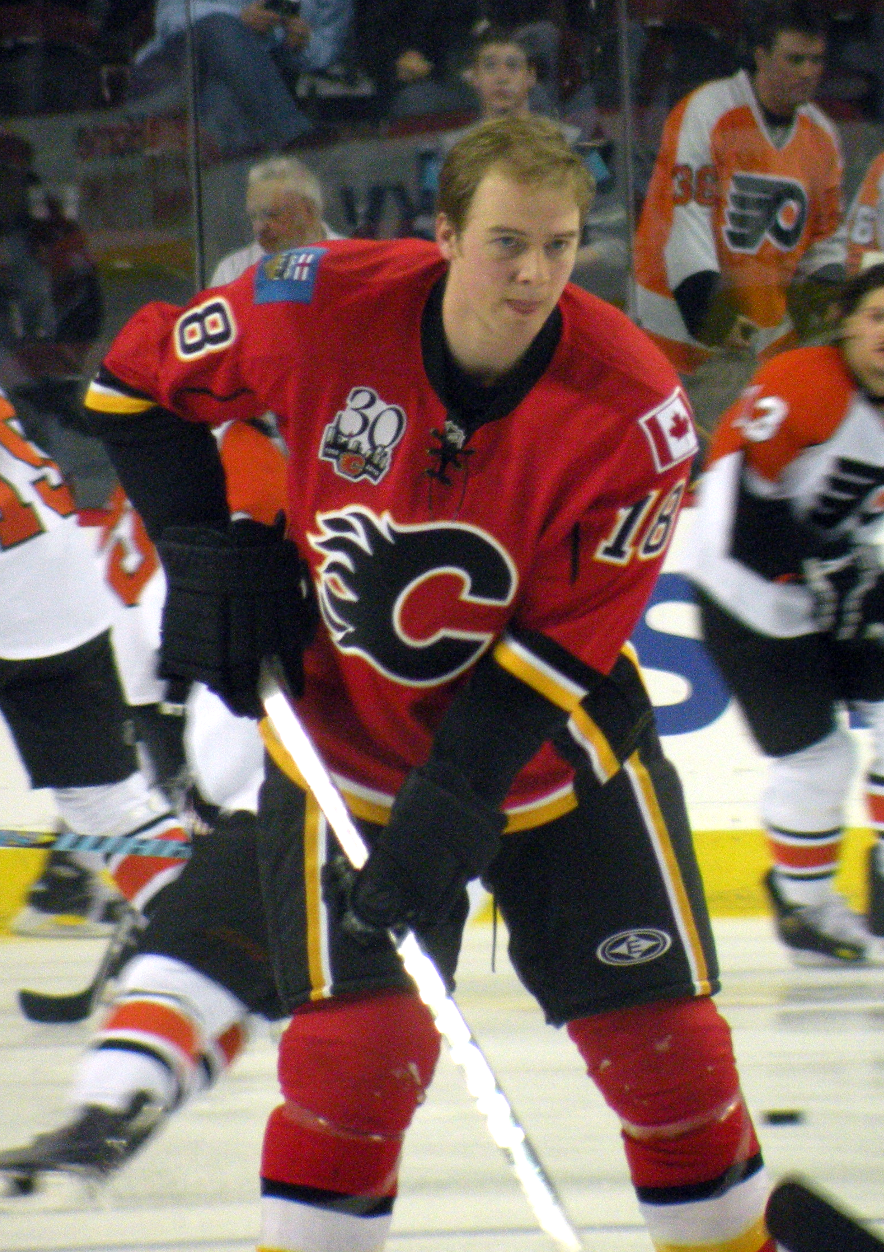
Matt Stajan

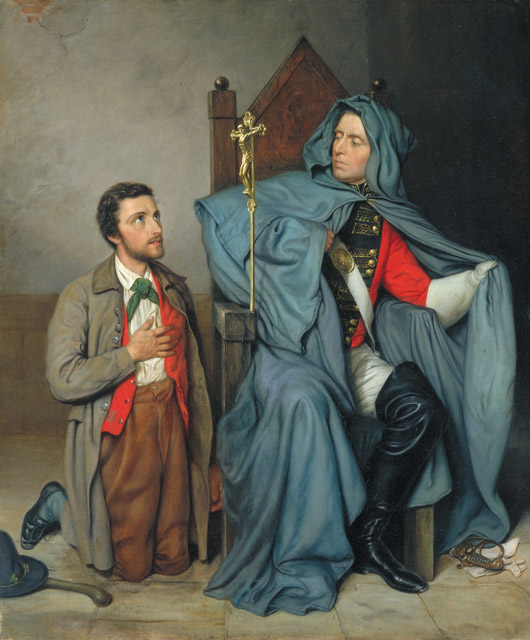
Artwork by Charlotte Schreiber

- Michelangelo Sabatino, architect, architectural historian
- Sheref Sabawy, MPP for Mississauga-Erin Mills
- Caryma Sa'd, lawyer, activist, cartoonist
- Rob Sampson, businessperson, former MPP, Minister of Correctional Services
- Sigmund Samuel (1868–1962), steel industry
- Colonel Sanders, founder of KFC
- Scott Sandison, field hockey
- Armand Sanguigni (1951–1984), outlaw biker, gangster, and hitman for the Cotroni family
- Ashlee Savona (born 1992), Canadian-born Guyanese women's international footballer
- Jessica Savona (born 1994), artistic gymnast
- Robert J. Sawyer, science fiction author
- Erica Scarff (born 1996), paracanoeist
- Kian Schaffer-Baker (born 1998), CFL wide receiver
- Kyle Schmid (born 1984), actor
- Charlotte Schreiber (1834–1922), artist
- Aaron Seltzer (born 1974), director and screenwriter team with Jason Friedberg, specializing in commercial successful parody films
- Alex Semenets (1990–2020), soccer player
- Wali Shah, musician and speaker
- Leanne Shapton (born 1973), artist and graphic novelist
- Janet Sheather (1912–?), Olympic swimmer
- Tara Shelley, actress
- Harold Shipp (1926–2014), developer, philanthropist
- Samantha Shirley (born 1983), former ice hockey player, former Canadian women's national inline hockey player
- Alexander MacDonald Shook (1888–1966), Canadian World War I flying ace
- Shroud (born 1994, Michael Grzesiek), former professional eSports player
- Matt Silva (born 1991), soccer player
- Lucas Silveira, vocalist, guitarist, songwriter, first openly transgender man signed to a major record label
- Bardia Sinaee, poet
- Meaghan Sittler (born 1976), NWHL ice hockey player
- Donna Smellie (born 1964), 1984 Olympic heptalthlete
- Kevin Smellie (born 1966), former CFL fullback football player
- Blair Smith (born 1990), football linebacker
- Bob Smith, comic book artist
- Eric Smith, Taekwondo, canoe/kayak – sprint
- Jelani Smith (born 1991), soccer player
- Lorne Smith (1928–2002), AHL and Elite Ice Hockey League hockey player and coach
- Morag Smith, television comedian
- Robert Smith (1819–1900), politician and farmer
- Steve Smith, television comedian and producer, Red Green on The Red Green Show
- John Smits (born 1988), soccer player, North American Soccer League
- Aaron Solowoniuk (born 1974), drummer for Billy Talent
- Alexander Sowinski (born 1991), drummer, music producer
- Charles Sousa (born 1958), provincial politician, cabinet minister
- Kris Sparre (born 1987), DEL2 ice hockey player
- Robert Speck (1915–1972), politician
- Robert James Speers (1882–1955), businessman, Canadian Sports Hall of Fame inductee
- Malcolm Spence (born 2006), OHL hockey player, 2025 NHL entry draft prospect
- Sven Spengemann (born 1966), MP
- Jason Spezza, hockey player for the Toronto Maple Leafs
- Greg Spottiswood, actor, writer and television producer
- Ryan Sproul (born 1993), hockey player, drafted by Detroit Red Wings
- Laura Stacey (born 1994), ice hockey player for the Montreal Victoire
- Matt Stajan, hockey player for the Calgary Flames
- Marina Stakusic (born 2004), tennis player
- Fred Stanfield (1944-2021), NHL ice hockey player, two Stanley Cups
- Jack Stanfield (b. 1942), WHA/NHL ice hockey player
- Jim Stanfield (1947–2009), NHL/WHL ice hockey player
- Vic Stanfield (b. 1951), ECAC ice hockey player
- Joshua Stanford (born 1994), CFL football player
- Nik Stauskas, chosen 8th overall in the 2014 NBA draft
- Tamara Steeves, Paralympic wheelchair basketball player
- Amanda Stepto (born 1970), actress (Degrassi Junior High, Degrassi High, Degrassi: The Next Generation)
- Roberto Stillo (born 1991), soccer player
- Dylan Strome (born 1997), hockey player for the Washington Capitals
- Ryan Strome, hockey player for the Anaheim Ducks
- Amanda Strong, media artist and filmmaker
- Dean Strong (born 1985), Italian Elite.A ice hockey player
- George Stroumboulopoulos (born 1972), television personality, Hockey Night in Canada
- Cameron Sylvester (born 1986), Olympic rower
- Krisztina Szabo, mezzo-soprano

== T ==
- Harinder Takhar, provincial politician
- Nina Tangri, MPP for Mississauga-Streetsville
- Tony Tanti, NHL player
- John Tavares, hockey player for the Toronto Maple Leafs
- John Tavares, NLL lacrosse player
- Matthew Tavares (born 1990), musician, songwriter, music producer
- Raheem Taylor-Parkes (born 1998), soccer player
- Kat Teasdale (1964–2016), racecar driver
- Jay Telfer (1947–2009), singer, songwriter, guitarist
- Ty Templeton, comic book artist
- Louis Temporale (1909–1994), O Ont, stone sculptor
- Aria Tesolin, opera singer
- Ian Tetley (born 1962), curler
- Elias Theodorou (born 1988), UFC Fighter
- Diane Therrien, mayor of Peterborough
- Gurminder Thind (born 1984), football player
- Curtis Thom (born 1986), wheelchair racer and coach, Paralympian
- Delisha Thomas, singer-songwriter
- Fletcher Stewart Thomas (1897–1957), member of Provincial Parliament for Elgin
- Denyse Thomasos (1964–2012), Trinidadian-Canadian abstract artist
- William Thompson (1786–1860), farmer, Militia member in the War of 1812 and Upper Canada Rebellion, politician
- Matt Tierney (born 1996), rugby union player
- Rick Titus (born 1969), retired footballer
- Kate Todd, actress (Radio Free Roscoe), singer
- Sonia Godding Togobo, filmmaker and editor
- Philip Tomasino (born 2001), ice hockey forward
- Dave Toycen, O Ont, World Vision Canada
- Lauren Toyota, television personality
- T. J. Trevelyan, DEL ice hockey player
- Michael Trotta (1974–2006), Bandidos motorcycle member killed in the Shedden massacre, 2006
- Masami Tsuruoka (1929–2014), O. Ont., karate instructor, known as the "father of Canadian karate"
- Endel Tulving (1927–2023), experimental psychologist and cognitive neuroscientist
- Barbara Turnbull, journalist and activist for people with disabilities

== U ==
- Stella Umeh (born 1975), artistic gymnast, 1992 Olympics
- Jim Unger, cartoonist, Herman
- Brent Urban (born 1991), NFL football player

== V ==
- Rechie Valdez (born c. 1980), member of Parliament
- Jamie Vanderbeken (born 1987), NBL basketball player
- Diana Van der Vlis (1935–2001), actress
- Debbie Van Kiekebelt (born 1954), sports broadcaster, athlete
- David Velastegui (born 1991), soccer player
- Paul Vermeersch, poet
- Harry Vetro (born 1995), drummer
- Sara Villani (born 1996), bobsledder
- Rebecca Vint (born 1992), ice hockey player
- David Visentin, realtor, television personality
- Owen von Richter (born 1975), swimming, men's 400 individual medley

== W ==
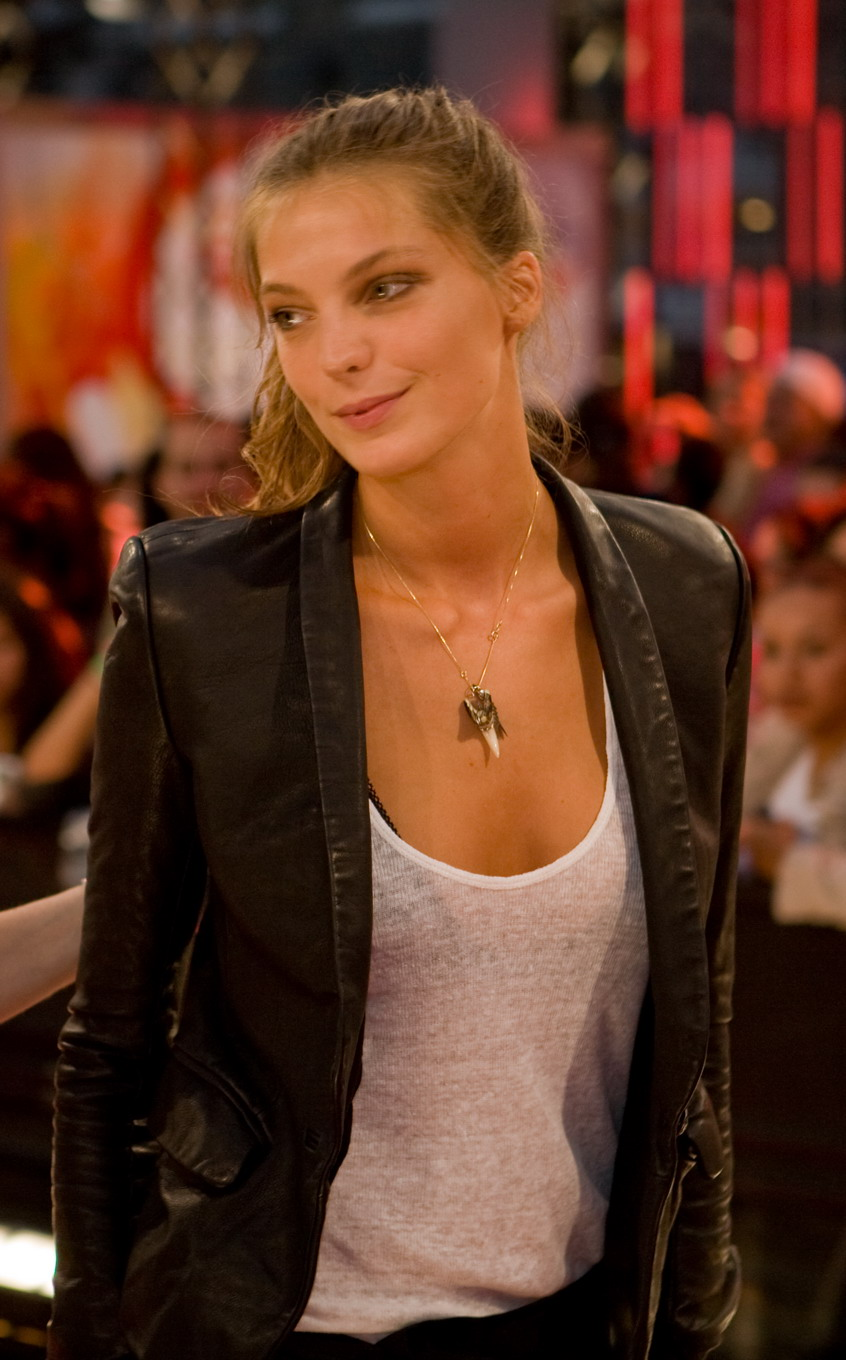
Daria Werbowy

- Eric Walters, C.M. (born 1957), author
- Nile Walwyn (born 1994), soccer player
- Gary Waterman, head coach for St. Francis Xavier University's football team
- Rob Wells, producer, songwriter
- Emery Welshman (born 1991), MLS soccer player for Real Salt Lake
- Daria Werbowy (born 1983), supermodel
- Fred J. White (1886–1967), Alberta MLA, labour activist
- Solomon White (1836–1911), ran a winery, provincial politician
- Akeem Whonder (born 1989), former Canadian football linebacker
- Natalie Wideman (born 1992), softball player, Olympian
- Aileen Williams (1924–2015), Black-Canadian activist
- Klaus Wilmsmeyer (born 1967), former National Football League player for the San Francisco 49ers, New Orleans Saints and Miami Dolphins
- Mike Wilner (born 1970), radio broadcaster
- John Tuzo Wilson (1908–1993), geophysicist
- Nobby Wirkowski (1926-2014), CFL football player, Grey Cup winner
- Greg Wojt (born 1985), football player
- Teneca Wolfe-Bell (born 1987), female Black jockey, perhaps the first to win a race in North America
- Mike Wolfs (born 1970), Olympic sailor
- Ted Woloshyn (born 1953), columnist, former talk radio host
- Erin Woodley (born 1972), Olympic synchronized swimmer
- Anthony Whyte (born 1996), League1 Ontario and Guyanese national football player
- Daniel Whyte (born 1994), League1 Ontario and Guyanese national football player

== X ==
- Phil X (born 1966, Philip Xenidis), Bon Jovi guitarist and songwriter

== Y ==
- Sura Yekka (born 1997), soccer, Canadian national team
- Sudarshan Yellamaraju (born 2001), professional golfer on the PGA Tour
- Michael Young (born 1994), bobsledder

== Z ==
- Marcel Zajac (born 1998), soccer player
- Mark Zubek, record producer, jazz musician

== See also ==
- List of people from Brampton
- List of people from Caledon, Ontario
