= Walwyn =

Walwyn is a surname. Notable people with the surname include:

- Charles Walwyn (1883–1959), British Army officer
- Clifford Walwyn, West Indian cricketer
- Fulke Walwyn, British jockey and racehorse trainer
  - Fulke Walwyn Kim Muir Challenge Cup
- Humphrey Walwyn, Royal Navy officer, Governor of Newfoundland
- James Humphrey Walwyn, Royal Navy officer
- John Walwyn (by 1520–1566 or later), English politician
- Karen Walwyn, American pianist and composer
- Keith Walwyn (1956–2003), Kittian footballer
- Matt Walwyn, footballer
- Myron Walwyn (born 1972), British Virgin Islander politician
- Nile Walwyn, footballer
- Peter Walwyn, British racehorse trainer
- Steve Walwyn (born 1956), English musician
- Thomas Walwyn, two 14th century Members of Parliament for Herefordshire constituency
- William Walwyn, English pamphleteer, a Leveller and a medical practitioner

== See also ==
- Walwyn Brewley, British Virgin Islander politician
- Walwyn's Castle, Pembrokeshire, Wales
