= Leslie Hancock =

Canadian politician

Ontario MPP
- In office 1943–1945
- Preceded by: James Harold King
- Succeeded by: William Ernest Hamilton
- Constituency: Wellington South

Personal details
- Born: March 10, 1892 Brabourne, Kent, England
- Died: December 2, 1977 (aged 85)
- Party: CCF (1943-1944); Independent Labour (1944-1945)
- Spouse: Dorothy Macklin
- Occupation: Horticulturist

Marcus Leslie Hancock (March 10, 1892 – December 2, 1977) was an English-born horticulturist and politician in Ontario, Canada. He represented Wellington South in the Legislative Assembly of Ontario from 1943 to 1945. He was initially a Co-operative Commonwealth Federation (CCF) MPP until late 1944 after he and fellow CCF MPP Arthur Nelson Alles endorsed a proposal by A. A. MacLeod, leader of the Communist Labor-Progressive Party for a coalition between the LPP, the Liberals and the CCF to oust the Ontario Progressive Conservative Party government of George A. Drew. Hancock and Alles left the CCF caucus to sit as Independent Labour MPPs after CCF party leader Ted Jolliffe rejected the LPP proposal. Hancock was sometimes listed as an Independent Farmer-Labour MPP during this period. Hancock did not run for re-election in the 1945 Ontario general election.

The son of Marcus Hancock and Caroline Dunn, he was born in Brabourne, Kent, came to Canada in 1914 and was educated at the Ontario Agricultural College. Hancock worked as a nurseryman, landscape designer and horticulture instructor. He served with the Princess Patricia's Canadian Light Infantry from 1915 to 1919, reaching the rank of lieutenant. From 1923 to 1927, he was a horticulturist at Nanking University in China. In 1924, he married Dorothy Macklin. Hancock was a teacher at the Ontario Agricultural College from 1932 to 1943. During World War II, he was able to help a number of Japanese-Canadians avoid a stay in an internment camp by hiring them to live and work on his garden property.

He was known as a breeder of rhododendrons. In 1972, Hancock founded the Rhododendron Society of Canada. He died of heart failure at the age of 85.

He designed the Heath Garden at the Montreal Botanical Garden, which was renamed in his honour in 1986.

His son was urban planner Macklin Leslie Hancock.
