= Benda House =

Historic house in Illinois, United States

- U.S. National Register of Historic Places
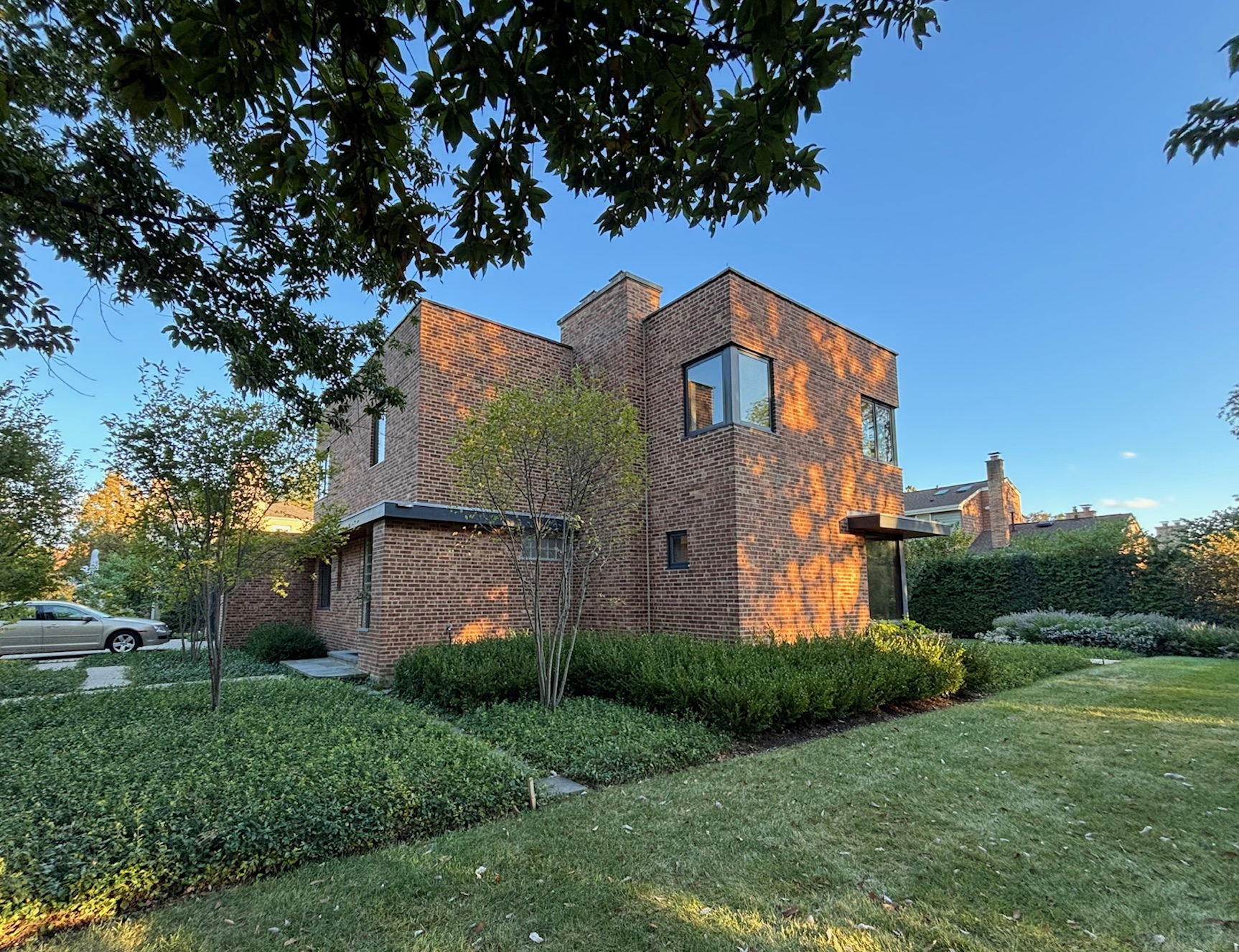

- Location within Illinois Location within the United States
- Location: 211 Southcote Road, Riverside, Illinois
- Coordinates: 41°50′20″N 87°48′48″W
- Built: 1939
- Architect: Winston Elting
- Architectural style: International Style
- NRHP reference No.: 100009252
- Added to NRHP: August 21, 2023

Benda House is a historic house in Riverside, Illinois, in the suburbs of Chicago. It is located in the Riverside Historic District. The house was designed by architect Winston Elting in 1938, and was listed on the National Register of Historic Places in 2023.

== Description ==
Benda House, located in Riverside, Illinois, lies about 12 miles (19 km) west-southwest of the Chicago Loop. The house is located within the Riverside Historic District, which is bordered by 1st Avenue to the west, 26th Street to the north, Harlem Avenue to the east, Ogden Avenue to the south, and the Des Plaines River. The district, which was designed by Frederick Law Olmsted, was listed on the National Register of Historic Places on September 15, 1969, and was named a National Historic Landmark on August 29, 1970.

Designed by Winston Elting, Benda House is a two-story, single-family brick house, designed in a Modern Movement/International Style, with asymmetrical architecture and a flat roof. The façades have a mix of large picture windows and medium-sized corner windows, framed in aluminum-clad wood casements. The perimeter walls include three wythes of brick on a concrete foundation. The interior partition walls combine wood framing with floor and roof wood joists. The house also has steel elements, including header beams and lally columns. The exterior features brickwork using a hybrid brick type, laid out in common-Flemish bond with raked (originally concave) mortar joints. The house exhibits overhangs, with fir tongue-and-groove soffits and charcoal grey painted fir fascia boards.

The interior plan features interconnected larger entertaining spaces and smaller service spaces for the kitchen and bathrooms. The first floor encompasses the entry foyer, staircase, living and dining rooms, kitchen, maid's room, bathroom, and porch. The second floor has three bedrooms, a bathroom, hallway closets, and an exterior sun deck. The basement contains a main room, storage area, and boiler/laundry room.

Original architectural elements, such as door hardware, aluminum staircase handrail, fireplace and hearth, built-in cabinetry, and more, are well-preserved. The original wood windows specified in the architectural drawings were changed to steel during construction in 1939, then replaced with aluminum-clad wood casement windows in the 1990s, aligning with the architect's design intent. Exterior and interior restoration efforts have been made, ensuring the preservation of materials and details. The landscaping also has been restored, maintaining the house's connection to the original vision for the village.

== History ==
Winston Elting designed the house in 1938 for Francis J. Benda and Sylvia Valha Benda, and it was completed in 1939. The design of the Benda House combines International Style and Modern Movement principles with elements of the Prairie School architecture. Elting specified "Autumtints" brick, a more cost-effective alternative to traditional face brick, and incorporated glass block elements to provide light while maintaining privacy. The original owners lived in the house until 1966, then it had several other owners.

Around 2014, the house was purchased by architectural historian Michelangelo Sabatino and architect Serge Ambrose. The house was included in the 2020 book Modern in the Middle: Chicago Houses 1929–75 by Susan Benjamin and Sabatino.

The owners of Benda House received the 2022 Preservation Award from the Frederick Law Olmsted Society of Riverside, for their work in restoring the house and its garden.

In April 2023, Sabatino and Ambrose applied to have the house added to the National Register of Historic Places, describing it in the nomination as "a rare exemplar of Modern Movement / International Style residential architecture in Chicago’s Western Suburbs". The house was added to the National Register of Historic Places on August 21, 2023. The designation made it the fourth property in Riverside with an individual National Register listing, joining the F. F. Tomek House and the Coonley House, both designed by Frank Lloyd Wright, as well as the 1871 Arcade Building.
