= University of Guelph-Humber =

University-college collaboration in Toronto, Canada

- Type: Public
- Established: 2002; 24 years ago
- Parent institution: University of Guelph; Humber Polytechnic
- Endowment: $10–20 million
- Vice-Provost: Melanie Spence-Ariemma
- Administrative staff: 250
- Undergraduates: 4,900
- Location: 207 Humber College Boulevard; Toronto, Ontario, Canada; 43°43′41″N 79°36′22″W
- Campus: Urban
- Colours: Red and blue
- Mascot: Swoop the Great Horned Owl
- Website: guelphhumber.ca

The University of Guelph-Humber (U of GH) is a collaboration between the University of Guelph and Humber Polytechnic, located on Humber's North Campus in the Etobicoke district of Toronto, Ontario, Canada.

== History ==
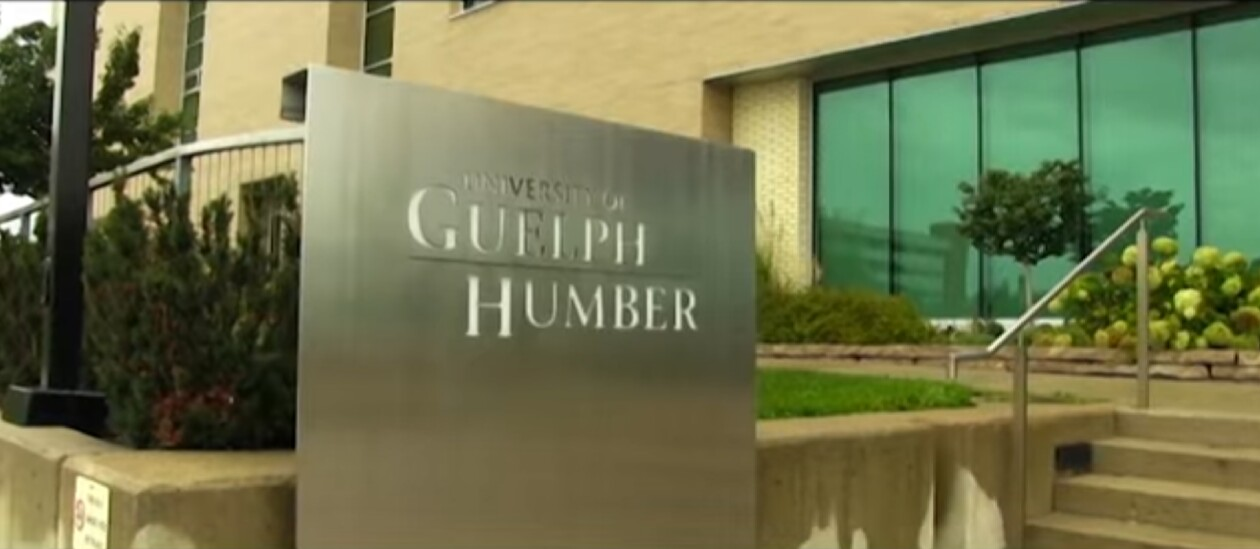
Guelph-Humber sign board outside the university

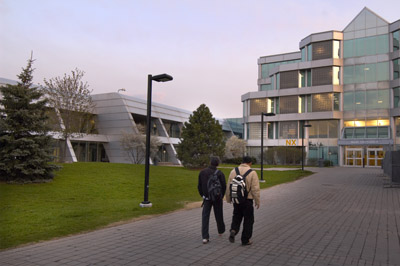
North campus of Humber Polytechnic

The institution was established in 2002 by a partnership of the University of Guelph and Humber Polytechnic. Its official website says that it was created to "produce a well-prepared university graduate".

== Organization ==
Guelph-Humber offers seven four-year undergraduate academic programs, each of which grants a university honours degree from the University of Guelph and a college diploma from Humber Polytechnic. The campus of Guelph-Humber is also home to the University of Guelph's MFA program.

== Academics ==
=== Admission ===
When Guelph-Humber opened, it was intended for 2,000 students, but has since seen a growing number of applicants. In 2014, it saw a 19% increase in applicants when student confirmations were dropping overall at Ontario universities. According to Guelph-Humber's official website, its programs' estimated cutoff range is 75–80%. However, the Guelph-Humber's vice-provost, John Walsh, said to the Toronto Sun in 2016 that the institution's incoming average is 80% for all programs.

=== Reputation ===
Maclean's magazine described Guelph-Humber programs as a "standout program" of the University of Guelph. Faze ranked the Guelph-Humber's "Media Studies" program as one of the best journalism school in Canada. The institution's "very low" attrition rate and "phenomenally high" four-year completion rate make it popular among students.

=== Undergraduate programs ===
- Business
- Early Childhood Studies
- Community Social Services
- Justice Studies
- Kinesiology
- Media and Communication Studies
- Psychology

== Campus life ==
=== Student government ===
Guelph-Humber's student government is known as Ignite. Students of Guelph-Humber can also apply to the University of Guelph's senate.

Each of the seven programs at Guelph-Humber has an Academic Program Representative (APR) whose role it is to sit on committees with the administration, work with the other elected officials on campus and be the voice of the students in their program. APRs are the third representative for Guelph-Humber students beyond Board of Directors with Ignite and Senators with University of Guelph.

=== Societies ===
- Alpha Phi Sigma
- DECA U
- Early Childhood Studies (ECS) Society
- FCSS Society
- Guelph-Humber Accounting Council (GHAC)
- Guelph-Humber Advertising & Marketing Association (GHAMA)
- Guelph-Humber Business Council (GHBC)
- Guelph-Humber Consulting Association (GHCA)
- Guelph-Humber Entrepreneurs Society (GHES)
- Guelph-Humber Finance Society (GHFS)
- Guelph-Humber Pre-Law Society (GHPLS)
- GuHu Media
- International Business Association
- Kinesiology Society
- Psi Chi (International Honour Society in Psychology)
- Psych Society
- Women in Business Society (WIBS)

=== Plant Wall ===
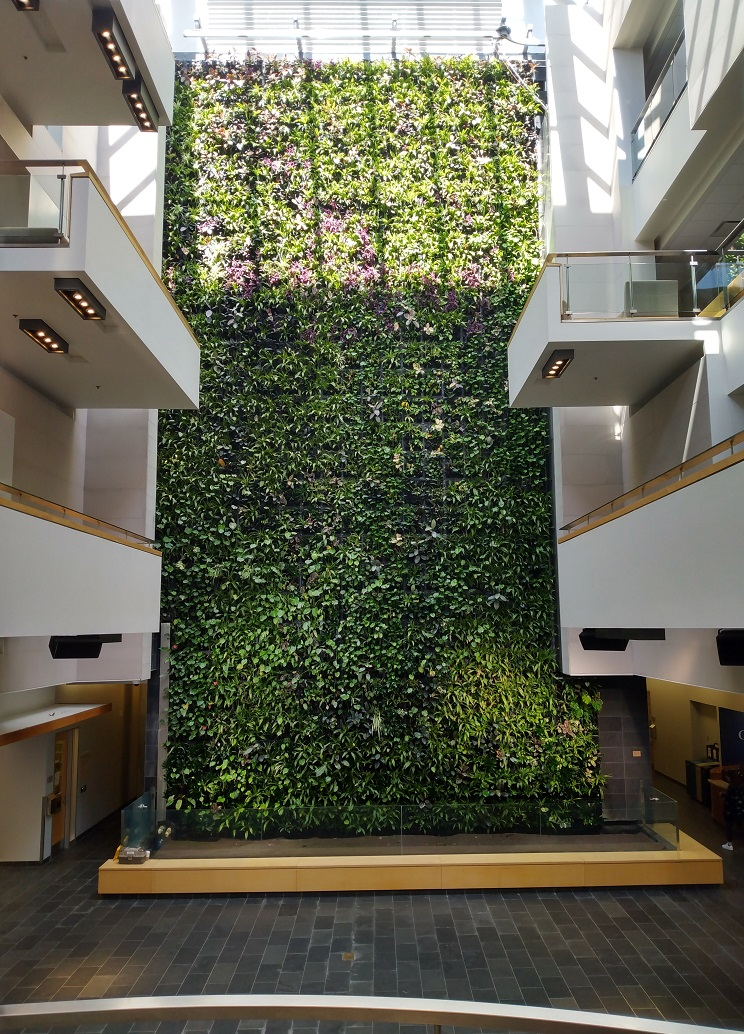

Guelph-Humber's Plant Wall is a new form of technology that uses a biological system to filter indoor air. The tropical plants that thrive on the four-story wall are exposed to nearly a full day of sunlight from the large windows and rooftop skylights. The wall has an area of approximately 150 square meters and consists of roughly over 1,000 individual living plants. It acts as a bio-filter and purifies the air that circulates around the building. Working like a humidifier, the wall warms the air in the winter and cools the building's air during the summer. The living wall also reduces the threat of airborne pollutants simply by creating a more esthetically pleasing environment. The wall also saves energy by lowering the need to bring new air into the building.

== Academic affiliation ==
Guelph-Humber has no degree or college diploma granting power. Graduates receive degrees from the University of Guelph and diplomas from Humber Polytechnic. Both the university and the college jointly hire academic faculty and staff. Guelph-Humber graduates receive alumni benefit cards from the University of Guelph. Sometimes outside sources describe Guelph-Humber as part of the University of Guelph; Mcleans in its university ranking called Guelph-Humber's programs "standout programs of the University of Guelph".

== Notable alumni ==
- Suze Morrison – Member of the Ontario Provincial Parliament
- Jackie Perez – Television personality
- Kaleed Rasheed – MPP for Mississauga East—Cooksville
- Mark Saunders – Toronto Police Chief; Bachelor of Applied Arts in Justice Studies
- Brendan Dunlop – Television personality
- Kristin Fairlie – Actor/Voice Actor/Singer
- Nada Alic – Author
