= Nada Alic =

Canadian writer

Nada Alić
- Born: Nada Alić; 1986 (age 39–40); Toronto, Ontario, Canada
- Education: University of Guelph-Humber
- Occupations: Novelist; Writer
- Partner: Ryan Hahn
- Writing career
- Genres: Fiction; Essays; Short Stories
- Notable work: Bad Thoughts

Nada Alić is a Croatian-Canadian writer based in Los Angeles. Her debut short story collection Bad Thoughts was published by Vintage Books in 2022. Bad Thoughts was a New York Times Editors' Choice pick and a runner-up for the Danuta Gleed Literary Award in 2023. Her short story The Intruder was shortlisted for the CBC Literary Prize in 2019.
