= Plant wall (University of Guelph-Humber) =

Located at the University of Guelph-Humber, the plant wall, also known as the living wall, is a new form of technology that uses a biological system to filter indoor air. The plant wall was invented by Alan Darlington.

The plant wall is one of the largest installations by Darlington and his company. The wall has an area of approximately 150 square meters and consists of over 1,000 individual living plants. The wall acts as a bio-filter and purifies the air that circulates around the building. Working like a humidifier, the plant wall warms the building's air in the winter and cools the air in the summer. The living wall reduces the threat of airborne pollutants and creates a more esthetically pleasing environment. The wall also saves energy by lowering the need to bring new air into the building.

== Method of operation ==
A plenum supports and distributes the airflow through the plant wall; a synthetic media covers this plenum. Ferns, foliage and flowering plants are planted hydroponically (without soil) into the synthetic media. The plants are then fed through a circulating nutrient solution. The building's air handling system, which the plant wall is connected to, removes dirty air. While that process is happening, the plants' leaves utilize CO_{2} in the air for photosynthesis, and oxygen is released back into the building.
