= Taya Marquis =

Canadian singer and songwriter (born 1989)

- Origin: Mississauga, Ontario, Canada
- Genres: Pop, R&B
- Occupations: Singer, songwriter
- Years active: 2008–present
- Website: www.tayamarquis.com

Taya Marquis (born February 8, 1989) is a Canadian singer and songwriter who has been performing since 2008.

== Early years ==
=== 1998–2003 ===
Taya Marquis grew up in the Greater Toronto Area city of Mississauga. She realized her passion for singing and songwriting at a young age. Writing her first song at age 10, and performing for friends, family, and at small events, Taya made up her mind that music was the only path for her. The ambitious young songwriter attended Mississauga's Cawthra Park Secondary School which specializes in performing arts.

== Musical career ==
Upon graduating in 2007, she moved to Los Angeles to write full-time, and pursue a career in the music industry. In a short time, her ambition led her into the studio with some heavy hitters.

In 2008 Taya co-wrote with platinum selling artist Ke$ha, on a song entitled "A La Discotheque". The song was released in 2010 as a free download. She also co-wrote with songwriter Robert Allen.

Taya wrote and performed the main theme song for Sony's video game,"The Agency", which was nominated at the 2009 Hollywood Music Awards for Best Original Song in Video Game. She also co-wrote and performed on the song entitled "Make it to the Sun" which featured Maxwell D and Mo Greene. The song was donated to president Barack Obama's campaign.

After being in California for 2 years, she moved back to Mississauga to study Entertainment Business Management at Metalworks Institute of Sound and Music Production. Taya found that her experiences in L.A. and at Metalworks, gave her the knowledge to develop not only her musical career, but to develop a brand.

Late 2009, while in school she began working with producer/engineer Mikal "Mikz" Gonzales, and founded Bi-Geminy Music Group. In 2010 the two co-wrote "One N Only" featuring Rayvon, Kobra Khan, and Taya herself (Produced by Alikat of ABC Productions).

Taya performed at the 2011 Canada's Walk of Fame Emerging Artist Showcase, after receiving a personal invite from founder Peter Soumalias. She shared the bill with artists such as Jully Black, K'naan, and Keys n Krates who performed at the festival in honor of the 2011 Canadian Walk of Fame Inductees. Taya was the opening act for Tinashe's Aquarius tour in Canada, and received great reviews via Boi1da.net as well as Bestfan Blog just to name a few. Taya has been named an Artist to watch by A&R Report, has performed and been interviewed on Popular Canadian Morning Show CP24 Breakfast.
