= Kary Osmond =

Kary Lyndsey Osmond (born October 18, 1979 in Mississauga, Ontario) is a Canadian chef who hosted Canadian Broadcasting Corporation's daytime cooking show Best Recipes Ever.

She grew up in a family that loved to cook and eat. Kary would help her mother in their family-owned Ukrainian deli. When they opened a catering company in their home's basement, Kary helped to roll meatballs, cut bread and wrap the veggie and fruit platters.

Kary's first official cooking class was in grade seven where she conquered her first recipe – Spaghetti à la Carbonara – in her Home Economics class. She then started collecting cookbooks with her first being a gift from her mom (Just for Kids Cookbook).

When she was young, she skated competitively and enjoyed traveling, spending many summers visiting family in British Columbia, Canada.

Kary is said to have had some chef school training at The George Brown College Chef School, but length of study remains unknown. She may have studied food theory to better understand the "whys" of cooking but most of her culinary knowledge was gleaned from her family and tirelessly studying cookbooks. Then putting into practice what she had learned.

At 30, the CBC called her in to audition for their brand new show – Best Recipes Ever. As the inaugural host, Kary shared tips and tricks with viewers to help them gain confidence in the kitchen and teach novices how to cook.

Kary did not return to Best Recipe's Ever after season four. In March 2013, she contributed, along with dozens of others, to a back-to-basics campaign with the Ontario Produce Marketing Association called Produce Made Simple. The campaign taught people how to pick, store, and prepare produce and also featured original recipes developed by Kary along with many others.
