= Michelangelo Sabatino =

Canadian-American author (born 1969)

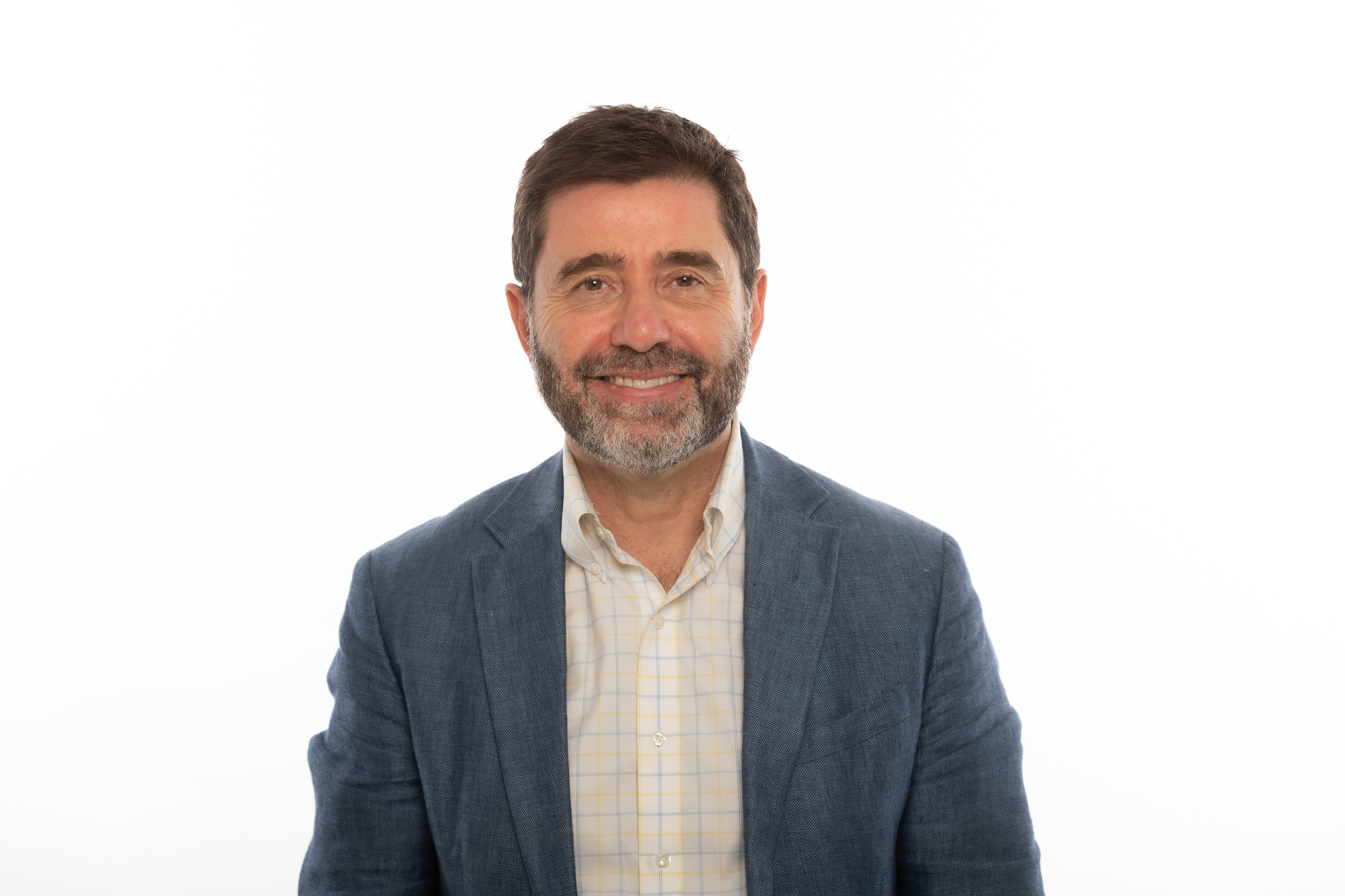
Michelangelo Sabatino

Michelangelo Sabatino is a Canadian-American architect, architectural historian, educator, curator, and preservationist based in San Antonio, Texas. He is the Roland K. Blumberg Endowed Professor and director of the School of Architecture + Planning in the Klesse College of Engineering and Integrated Design at the University of Texas at San Antonio. He previously served as professor of Architectural History and Preservation in the College of Architecture at the Illinois Institute of Technology (IIT).

Sabatino writes about both well-known and lesser known twentieth-century architects and modern buildings, and how cultural and social forces affect the built environment.

== Early life and education ==
Sabatino was raised in Toronto and Mississauga, Ontario, by Italian immigrant parents. He earned a professional degree in architecture from IUAV University of Venice, completed a doctorate in Fine Art at the University of Toronto, and held a postdoctoral fellowship in the History of Art and Architecture at Harvard University.

== Academic career ==
Sabatino has also taught at the Yale School of Architecture and was a faculty member at the University of Houston’s Gerald D. Hines College of Architecture and Design.

From 2017 to 2020, he served as interim dean of the IIT College of Architecture, holding the Rowe Family Endowed Dean Chair. He has founded and led several initiatives at IIT, including a gallery, a Ph.D. symposium, a holiday gospel concert, and the journal Prometheus: Journal of the PhD Program in Architecture.

Sabatino has received fellowships from institutions including the MacDowell Colony, and was named Lila Wallace Reader’s Digest Visiting Professor at Villa I Tatti through the Harvard University Center for Italian Renaissance Studies (2023–24) and Honorary Fellow of the Royal Architectural Institute of Canada in 2025.

== Publications and scholarship ==
Sabatino has written or edited more than 20 books, and his articles have appeared in journals including The Journal of Architecture, and Canadian Architect and in anthologies such The Rationalist Reader: Architecture and Rationalism in Western Europe 1920-1940 / 1960-1990, and Sanctioning Modernism: Architecture and the Making of Postwar Identities. Much of Sabatino’s writing and research explores how technology, design and culture affect the built environment. He served as co-editor of the book Building, Breaking, and Rebuilding: The Illinois Institute of Technology Campus and Chicago’s South Side.

=== Selected bibliography ===
Modern, Again: The Benda House & Garden in Chicagoland, with Serge Ambrose (RIBA Books Oro Editions, 2025)

The Global Turn: Six Journeys of Modern Architecture and the City 1945–1989, with Tom Avermaete (Nai010, 2025)

The Edith Farnsworth House: Architecture, Preservation, Culture (Monacelli Press, 2024)

Mies in His Own Words: Complete Writings, Speeches, and Interviews 1922–1969, ed. with Vittorio Pizzigoni (DOM, 2024)

Carlo Mollino: Architect and Storyteller, with Napoleone Ferrari (Park Books, 2022)

Making Houston Modern: The Life and Architecture of Howard Barnstone, with Stephen Fox and Barrie Scardino Bradley (University of Texas Press, 2020)

Modern in the Middle: Chicago Houses 1929–75, with Susan Benjamin (Monacelli Press, 2020)

Pride in Modesty: Modernist Architecture and the Vernacular Tradition in Italy (University of Toronto Press, 2011)

== Honors and awards ==
Honorary Fellow, Royal Architectural Institute of Canada (2025)

Lila Wallace Reader’s Digest Visiting Professor, Villa I Tatti, Harvard University (2024–2025)

Docomomo US Modernism in America Awards (2020, 2024)

Allen G. Noble Award for Best Edited Book (2019)

Bruno Zevi Book Award Shortlist (2016)

Alice Davis Hitchcock Book Award (2010)

MLA Aldo and Jeanne Scaglione Prize for Italian Studies (2010)

== Other activities ==
Exhibitions include A Living Room for Bronzeville (IIT, 2024) Outside the Box (Riverside, Illinois, 2023) and Picturing Riverside: An Exhibition of a Landmark Landscape Community curated with IIT PhD Students and Riverside Historical Commission (Riverside Train Station 2017).

Sabatino serves on numerous boards of directors as well as editorial and advisory boards, including those of the Society of Architectural Historians Docomomo International and Docomomo US and Docomomo Journal.

In 2012, Sabatino and his partner Serge Ambrose established Modern Again Architecture & Preservation Studio. Prior to moving to San Antonio in 2025, Sabatino and Ambrose preserved and restored the Benda House, a 1930s modern home in Chicagoland, earning the 2022 Preservation Award from the Frederick Law Olmsted Society of Riverside.
