= Teneca Wolfe-Bell =

Black female jockey in Canada

- Born: Mississauga, Ontario
- Occupation: Jockey
- Years active: 2006 on

Teneca Wolfe-Bell (born 1987) is a Canadian jockey, the only Black female rider running races in Ontario, and believed to be the first Black female jockey to win a race in North America. She won her first race at Fort Erie Race Track on June 28, 2016.

Her status as the only Black female jockey in the province was known in 2016, and continues as of 2021. She is also believed to be the first Black female jockey to win a race at Canada's biggest racetrack Woodbine Racetrack, which she did on October 16, 2020, while riding the gelding Majestic Melody. As of 2016, she was one of only six female riders in Ontario.

Wolfe-Bell has worked for Hall of Fame trainers including Reade Baker and Sid Attard. She started in the horse racing industry as a hotwalker, then a groom, to an exercise rider, before becoming a jockey. Receiving her apprentice jockey license in British Columbia in 2015, her first 12 races were at that province's Hastings Racecourse.

Wolfe-Bell was born in Mississauga, and raised in Brampton. Her father, Trevor Davis, worked as a groom at Woodbine.
