= Best Recipes Ever =

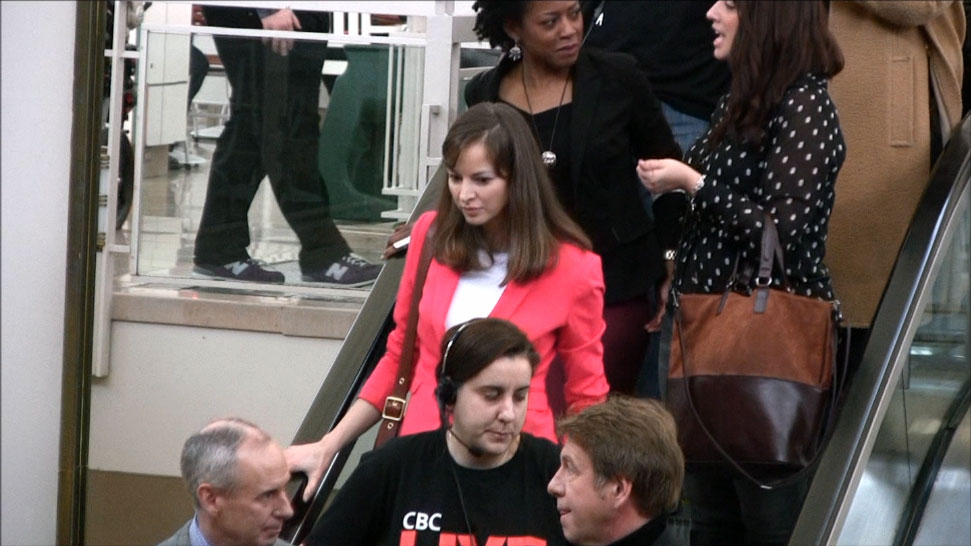
- Christine Tizzard en route to a CBC Live event, Sherway Gardens.
- Genre: Cooking show
- Starring: Kary Osmond (seasons 1-3); Christine Tizzard (seasons 4-5)
- Country of origin: Canada
- Original language: English
- No. of seasons: 5
- No. of episodes: 369 (list of episodes)

Original release
- Network: CBC Television
- Release: January 4, 2010 – March 17, 2014

Best Recipes Ever is a Canadian cooking show that debuted January 4, 2010 on CBC Television. Produced by the CBC in conjunction with Canadian Living magazine, the show was hosted by Kary Osmond until January 2013, when Christine Tizzard took over as host.

In each half-hour episode the host demonstrates how to make three dishes, all of which fit a specific theme such as 'Best Comfort Food' or 'Best Middle Eastern Take Out'. Reruns of the show air in the United States on the Live Well Network in selected markets as a digital subchannel.

On March 18, 2014, CBC announced that Best Recipes Ever was cancelled.

== Series overview ==
Season	Episodes	Originally released	
Season	Episodes	First released	Last released
1	65	January 4, 2010	April 16, 2010
2	85	September 2010	August 2011
3	139	September 2011	October 2012
4	35	January 14, 2013	March 17, 2014

== Episodes ==
No.	Title	Original release date
1	"Best Meat-and-Potatoes Meal"	January 4, 2010
Recipes: The Ultimate Caesar Salad, Family-Size T-Bone Steaks, Cheesy Broccoli Baked Potatoes
2	"Pantry Raid Dinner"	January 5, 2010
Recipes: Salmon Cakes with Lemon Aioli, Puttanesca Sauce, Three Bean Salad
3	"Best Greek Take-Out"	January 6, 2010
Recipes: Greek Tzatziki, Chicken Souvlaki, Grilled Calamari with Lemon and Oregano, Great Big Hothouse Greek Salad
4	"Family Favourites Made Healthy"	January 7, 2010
Recipes: Crispy Fish Fillets with Tartar Sauce, Sweet Potato Fries with Curry Mayonnaise, Phyllo Cluster Apple Tarts
5	"Sunday Roast Beef Dinner"	January 8, 2010
Recipes: Sirloin Tip Oven Roast with Porcini Mushroom Jus, Roasted Fall Vegetables, Smashed Leek Potatoes
65	"Bridal Shower Treats"	April 16, 2010
Recipes: Gorgonzola and Black Mission Fig Cups, Waldorf Chicken Salad Tea Sandwiches, Asparagus Smoked Salmon Pinwheels, Rich White Chocolate Cheesecake Dip
