= Jackie Perez =

Canadian television personality and reporter

- Born: Manila, Philippines
- Education: University of Guelph-Humber
- Occupations: TV host, Reporter

Jackie Perez is a Canadian television personality and reporter.

== Early life and education ==
Perez was born in Manila, Philippines and raised in Mississauga, Ontario. She graduated from the Media Studies program at the University of Guelph-Humber.

== Career ==
Perez started her career with an internship at The Mississauga News and was a host and reporter at Rogers TV Mississauga's InSauga.com, a show that highlights Mississauga's culture.

In 2011, she joined the Toronto Argonauts as a cheerleader. In 2012, she became captain of the cheer team before becoming an in-game host for the Argonauts.

Perez joined CTV Prince Albert as a video journalist in December 2017. In October 2018, she made the move to CTV Regina to take on the role of On the Go reporter for CTV Morning Live. Every weekday morning she gives a live look at what's happening around the city and neighbouring communities in southern Saskatchewan.
