= Macklin Leslie Hancock =

Canadian urban planner

Mack Hancock
- Born: April 29, 1925; Nanjing, China
- Died: September 14, 2010 (age 85); Toronto, Ontario
- Spouse: Grace Fraser
- Children: 6

Macklin Leslie Hancock OOnt (1925 - September 14, 2010) was an Order of Ontario winning urban planner, who was integral in planning Don Mills.

The son of Dorothy Macklin and Leslie Hancock, he was born in Nanking, China. The family was forced to leave China following the revolution of 1927. Hancock was educated in Port Credit, Ontario, at the Ontario Agricultural College and at Harvard Graduate School of Design. He served as a pilot during World War II. He was a founding member of Project Planning Associates Limited and served as its president.

Hancock died at Sunnybrook Hospital in Toronto.
