= Akeem Whonder =

Canadian football player (born 1989)

No. 46
- Position: Linebacker

Personal information
- Born: May 18, 1989 (age 37)
- Listed height: 5 ft 11 in (1.80 m)
- Listed weight: 224 lb (102 kg)

Career information
- College: Windsor

Career history
- 2014: Calgary Stampeders*
- 2015–2016: Toronto Argonauts*
- 2017: Winnipeg Blue Bombers*
- 2017: Hamilton Tiger-Cats
- * Offseason or practice squad member only

Awards and highlights
- Grey Cup champion (2014)

Career statistics
- Games played: 1
- Tackles: 3

Akeem Whonder (born May 18, 1989) is a Canadian former professional football linebacker who played in the Canadian Football League (CFL). He played U Sports football for the Windsor Lancers and went unselected in the 2014 CFL draft, later being signed by the Calgary Stampeders. He was a member of their Grey Cup championship team that year and later had stints with the Toronto Argonauts, Winnipeg Blue Bombers and Hamilton Tiger-Cats. He played his only CFL game with the Tiger-Cats in 2017.

== College career ==
Whonder graduated from St. Joseph Secondary School in Mississauga, Ontario, and afterwards attended the University of Windsor, where he played 37 games for the Windsor Lancers football team. In those games, Whonder recorded 175 defense tackles, eight quarterback sacks, four forced fumbles, two fumble recoveries and one interception.

As a senior in 2013, Whonder earned Ontario University Athletics all-star honours.

== Professional career ==
=== Calgary Stampeders ===
After going unselected in the 2014 CFL draft, Whonder signed with the Calgary Stampeders as an undrafted free agent. He spent the season on the practice roster, being a member of their Grey Cup championship squad.

=== Toronto Argonauts ===
On January 7, 2015, Whonder was signed by the Toronto Argonauts. He suffered a season-ending injury in preseason against the Montreal Alouettes. He was re-signed in December but did not make the team in 2016.

=== Winnipeg Blue Bombers ===
Whonder was signed by the Winnipeg Blue Bombers in January 2017, but did not appear in any games.

=== Hamilton Tiger-Cats ===
In September 2017, Whonder was signed by the Hamilton Tiger-Cats. He was a member of the practice roster for the majority of his time there, but was able to make an appearance in one game, posting three tackles. He was released in June 2018.
