= Liam Massaubi =

Canadian entrepreneur, business person and investor

- Born: 1986 (age 39–40); Mississauga, Ontario, Canada
- Occupations: Entrepreneur, designer, and investor
- Known for: Supporting first nation causes

Liam Massaubi is a Canadian entrepreneur, businessperson and investor. He is an Aboriginal business consultant and designer. He is primarily focused in the construction, custom home building and concrete industry. He is a status member of the Henvey Inlet First Nation and is of both Mohawk people and Ojibwe descent.

== Career ==
Massaubi began Kanati Clothing Company with a couple of friends in July 2009 and the company was originally operated from his mother's garage and it grew into a Toronto-based fashion label, retailer and manufacturer.

The company gained notoriety as a pioneer in the fashion industry by creating an Aboriginal-influenced premium lifestyle band, which had not yet been seen before. "Kanati Co." grew to national distribution in the first year in business and it eventually developed into a 14-country distribution network over the next 5 years. The Kanati Co. brand is distributed in North America, United Kingdom, Europe and Japan through GSG Apparel, Inc.

The brand was popularized in the U.S. by its appearance in numerous music videos from artists like Drag-On of Ruff Ryders Entertainment, Joey Stylez, Meek Mill/Rick Ross, Ja Rule and other popular musicians such as Sean P from the group YoungBloodZ. The label was seen on music group Winnipeg's Most in the Maclean's Magazine "Straight Outta Winnipeg" feature as well as on CBC Television's Aboriginal series "8th Fire" hosted by Wab Kinew.

He has worked with and consulted more than 50 brands including Nike. In 2016, he detailed why most startups fail with YFS Magazine.

Under Massaubi’s leadership, the company saw continuous growth for 7 years. The company launched its flagship store in Waterloo, Ontario in August, 2014. In July 2015, Kanati Company was sold and Massaubi retired as the company's CEO to pursue real estate and non-profit interests. He sold his remaining shares in the company.

In an interview with MUSKRAT Magazine, Massaubi said he had "mixed feelings" about what the company who purchased the brand did with the company and brand but would not elaborate. The magazine referred to Massaubi as a "Powerhouse Designer." In a later article with INC.com, Massaubi stated the buyer of the company "expressed one future direction for my company during the sale process, and then did the exact opposite" and said he wasn't pleased with the process.

Massaubi is a multi-business investor with interests in transportation, food and beverage, retail and real estate and primarily residential development projects. He is also an Aboriginal Business Consultant (mentor) who works closely with corporations who are committed to creating procurement opportunities for Aboriginal businesses.

He was featured on VentureBeat listing his top 15 errors entrepreneurs make when pitching him projects and looking for investment for their startup company's.

In 2016, Massaubi signed on to join fellow entrepreneurs Greg Selkoe, founder of Karmaloop, and Divine on the CAP (Close and Personal) Tour. The CAP Tour features the three entrepreneurs who have collectively created startups with more than $300 million in revenue. The 150-stop tour is a series of panel discussions and workshops across North America that aims to teach, inspire and engage the future entrepreneurs of the Aboriginal community.

In 2016, Massaubi signed on to be a blogger with The Huffington Post, where he comments on First Nation business and social issues.

In 2016, he signed on with Inc.com and launched a column called "Money Talks" which provides business tips and strategy advice for entrepreneurs and startups. The magazine publishes an annual list of the 500 fastest-growing private companies in the U.S.

In an exclusive interview with Incline Magazine in October 2016, it was revealed that Massaubi had retired at the age of just 30 and he would now just invest and work on real estate projects.

== First Nations Causes ==
=== Entrepreneurship ===
Massaubi has stressed that "First Nations Entrepreneurship is Key to Ending the Cycle of Hardship" with Huffington Post Canada. He urged for First Nations leadership to invest in their own communities and suggested that entrepreneurship could help solve social issues facing the community such as youth suicides and incarceration rates.

Massaubi believes that encouraging entrepreneurship in First Nations youth is important to solving issues within the Aboriginal community. He has been a vocal critic of consultants and experts often employed in First Nations communities as well as some government programs claiming that they do not help the people on the ground level. He was quoted saying "The political track record specifically for First Nations issues is a glaring example of either no action or actions such as funding ridiculous programs that only pay consultants and never reach or benefit the people at the ground level."

With Inc.com, Massaubi provides advice to new entrepreneurs on everything from the importance of debt management to selling products to major retail chains. He also provides advice for first-time entrepreneurs to raise venture capital.

Speaking with Executive Lifestyle Magazine, Massaubi detailed the importance of entrepreneurship and provided advice on why founders shouldn't launch startups if they aren't prepared or for the wrong reasons. He has also encouraged startup founders to not overlook job applicants with criminal records stating "they shouldn't be judged by the lowest point in their lives." He stressed that youth only think in the moment and do not see future consequences and impacts of their actions. He believes that giving these people a chance can be beneficial to employers in numerous ways and the fact that 92% of employers screen at some level for criminal histories only keeps people in the justice system when they can't find gainful employment. He said, "A criminal record does not mean a person isn’t qualified or doesn’t have something to offer. But the presence of a criminal record seems to perpetuate that notion."

=== Indigenous Water Rights & Housing ===
In 2016, Massaubi said that the First Nations water crisis was "beyond a national embarrassment" and expressed hope but doubt that the Liberal Party could put an end to the boil-water advisories in more than 100 First Nation communities in 5 years. He also stressed the Government of Canada to launch a comprehensive review into the causes behind the unsafe water and hold any corporation, group or individual found contaminating the source water criminally responsible. Massaubi said that Canada has an obligation to end the water crisis and said that the situation would not be tolerated if it happened in a major city like Toronto.

Massaubi called on the Liberal Government to end the First Nations housing crisis and claimed it would be over if Ottawa made an effort to actually end it. He slammed the way homes are built in many First Nation communities saying they should not be considered housing and need to be bulldozed. He claimed that people are living in third-world conditions in Canada and stated that many consultants and contractors are "useless" and are not "experts" and only looking a quick payday on reservations where they are not monitored and regulated as they would be in a city saying "Let's be clear -- builders and contractors can see government funding as easy money and First Nations communities in particular as an easy target to rip off."

He has also spoken out about the soaring costs of food in northern Ontario First Nation communities. After Food Secure Canada released the first comprehensive study to analyze the effect of high food prices in northern Ontario communities suggested that First Nations people living in remote northern Ontario communities need to spend more than half their income on food to meet basic nutritional needs, Massaubi called on the government to once again review and fix broken programs as well as the role of consultants stating "I continue to urge that the role and compensation of consultants and "experts" be a key area for review—and change." A 2014 Auditor General report also questioned the effectiveness of the government programs.

=== Mikinak Tribe Controversy ===
In a 2016 Huffington Post article, Massaubi slammed the newly formed Mikinak Tribe and Costco claiming that the "Tribe Created to Save Taxes Disrespects Indigenous Struggles" and called the tribe "predatory" and only seeking tax breaks. Massaubi is not the only Mikinak critic, Mohawk Grand Chief Joe Norton also accused the Mikinak's of being "frauds" and "lies."

His comments describing the Mikinak's as "phony, self-centred, opportunistic, predatory people." were published in a University of Alberta paper for the Centre for Constitutional Studies on Aboriginal Rights.

=== Police & Racism ===
In the summer of 2016, Massaubi spoke out about how police target Native Americans and how they are killed in police interactions at rates almost identical to the black community. He also detailed his own experience being profiled by the Ontario Provincial Police and being stopped in his Mercedes-Benz and harassed. He also brought up the issue of the Ipperwash Crisis where an unarmed protester named Dudley George was shot and killed by an OPP officer. Massaubi urged for better police training and changes to policy and systematic injustices claiming "Do you see what I mean about it being systemic? Our society and our systems create criminals."

However, Massaubi also spoke out in support of First Nations police services and pointed out that the lack of funding puts officers in dangerous situations and that the lack of funding undermines policing and urged both the federal government and First Nations leadership to invest in more policing in First Nation communities and provide the tools and support to deal with crises, critical and criminal situations as well as contribute to community policing approaches that provide opportunities for restoration, alternatives to charges and safe communities for children.

He has been outspoken on racism towards Aboriginal people.

=== Dakota Access Pipeline ===
Massaubi offered support to the protesters of the Dakota Access Pipeline and said that the construction is an example of environmental racism. He also called the attacks on protesters by militarized police "cowardly and callous" and said that police working on behalf of private corporations is "frightening, particularly when big business is on the wrong side of the law." He also stated that the "pipeline represents no real benefit to the American public" and pointed out the fact that 17 million people rely on the Missouri River which the pipeline is slated to cross.

== Personal life ==
Massaubi's father was a residential school survivor. He currently resides in Goderich, Ontario with his wife and children.
