= Nile Walwyn =

Footballer (born 1994)

Personal information
- Full name: Nile Alexander Walwyn
- Date of birth: 11 July 1994 (age 32)
- Place of birth: Mississauga, Ontario, Canada
- Height: 1.86 m (6 ft 1 in)
- Position: Defender

Youth career
- Dixie SC

College career
Years	Team	Apps	(Gls)
2012–2015	Vermont Catamounts	57	(3)

Senior career*
Years	Team	Apps	(Gls)
2015–2016	Burlingame Dragons	7	(0)
2016–2017	Hawke's Bay United	10	(0)
2018	ÍR	7	(0)
2018	Tindastóll	8	(0)
Total		32	(0)

International career^{‡}
2012	Saint Kitts and Nevis U20	3	(0)
2011	Saint Kitts and Nevis U23	3	(0)
2015	Saint Kitts and Nevis	3	(0)
- * Club domestic league appearances and goals as of 11 July 2020 ‡ National team caps and goals as of 11 July 2020

Nile Alexander Walwyn (born 11 July 1994) is a former professional footballer. Born in Canada, he represented Saint Kitts and Nevis at international level.

== Early life ==
Walwyn is a native of Mississauga, Canada where he played youth soccer with Dixie SC.

== College career ==
In 2012, Walwyn began attending the University of Vermont, where he played for the men's soccer team. He scored his first collegiate goal on 31 August 2014 in a 3-1 victory over the Appalachian State Mountaineers, to help Vermont win the James Madison University Invitational. Ahead of his senior season, he was named team captain. He scored the game-winning goal in a 1-0 over the Sacred Heart Pioneers, also being sent off after receiving a red card in the same match, in the first game of the 2015 season. In his senior season, he won the America East Conference title with Vermont and was named to the All-Tournament Team. During his time at Vermont, he was named to the America East Academic Honor Roll in 2013, 2014, and 2015, and the Commissioner's Honor Roll in 2012.

== Club career ==
In 2015, he joined the Burlingame Dragons in the Premier Development League. In his two seasons, he made seven appearances for the club.

In October 2016, he joined Hawke's Bay United FC of the New Zealand Football Championship. He joined after being introduced to the league by a teammate from California and reaching out to the coach. In January 2017, he departed the club.

In March 2017, he went on trial with Icelandic club Þróttur Vogum. In March 2018, he joined Icelandic club Íþróttafélag Reykjavíkur (ÍR) in the 1. deild karla. In July 2018, he departed the club. In July 2018, he joined another Icelandic club, Tindastóll in the 2. deild karla.

In October 2018, he attended the Canadian Premier League Open Trials, hoping to earn a contract in the new league, where he advanced to the third stage of the trial process with the final 31 participants. In 2021, he confirmed he had retired from professional football.

== International career ==
Born in Canada, Walwyn was also eligible to represent Saint Kitts and Nevis, through descent.

He represented St. Kitts at youth level. In 2011, he was called up to the Saint Kitts and Nevis U23 team for the 2012 CONCACAF Men's Olympic Qualifying Championship qualification tournament. In 2012, he was named to the Saint Kitts and Nevis U20 roster for the 2013 CONCACAF U-20 Championship qualifying tournament.

In 2015, he was called up to the Saint Kitts and Nevis senior team for 2018 FIFA World Cup qualification. He made his debut against the Turks and Caicos Islands. In 2018, he was called up for a match against his native Canada, but did not enter the match, remaining an unused substitute.
