= Mayor of Mississauga =

Political office

- Municipal logo

- Incumbent; Alvin Tedjo since November 15, 2026
- Style: His/Her Worship; Mayor (informal)
- Member of: City Council
- Seat: Mississauga Civic Centre
- Appointer: Direct election
- Term length: 4 years
- Inaugural holder: Robert Speck
- Formation: 1967; 59 years ago
- Salary: $146,198 + $31,219 in benefits
- Website: Mayor's Office City Website

The mayor of Mississauga is the head of Mississauga City Council and chief executive officer of the municipal government. The mayor is elected alongside city council every four years on the fourth Monday of October; there are no term limits. While in office, mayors are styled His/Her Worship.

Alvin Tedjo is the current mayor of Mississauga, after being elected on October 26, 2026. His term began on November 15, and he was formally sworn in on November 16, succeeding Carolyn Parrish.

== Mayors of Mississauga ==
This list includes the two mayors of the Town of Mississauga (existing from 1968 to 1973), and the five mayors of the City of Mississauga (1974 to present):

=== Town of Mississauga ===
Before 1968, Mississauga (excluding the then-independent towns of Port Credit and Streetsville) was known as Toronto Township, and led by a reeve.

No.	Mayor	In office		Notes
1	Robert Speck	1968	1972	Former reeve of Toronto Township. Died in office.
2	Chic Murray	1972	1973	Interim mayor, appointed by Council following Speck's death.

=== City of Mississauga ===
In 1974, the City of Mississauga was formed when the Town of Mississauga was amalgamated with Port Credit and Streetsville:

No.	Mayor	In office		Notes
3	Martin Dobkin	1973	1976	First mayor of the City of Mississauga.
4	Ron Searle	1976	1978	Former town councillor and city councillor.
5	Hazel McCallion	December 1, 1978	November 30, 2014	Former mayor of Streetsville. Longest-serving mayor of Mississauga.
6	Bonnie Crombie	December 1, 2014	January 12, 2024	Former city councillor and Member of Parliament for Mississauga—Streetsville. Resigned the mayoralty after being elected leader of the Ontario Liberal Party in the 2023 OLP leadership election
7	Carolyn Parrish	June 24, 2024	November 15, 2026	Former city councillor and Member of Parliament for various ridings in Mississauga. Elected mayor in the June 10, 2024 by-election prompted by Crombie's resignation.
8	Alvin Tedjo	November 15, 2026	present	Ward 2 councillor 2022-2026.

There are three living former mayors: Dobkin, Crombie and Parrish.

== Deputy mayor ==
City councillor(s) may be appointed by the mayor on an honorary basis.

Portrait	Deputy mayor	Term began	Term concluded	Constituency as councillor
	Matt Mahoney	June 27, 2024	November 15, 2026	Ward 8 Erin Mills

== Election results ==
=== 2026 ===
2026 Mississauga municipal election - Mayor (unofficial)
Candidate	Votes	%	(Note: Relative to 2024 byelection)
Alvin Tedjo	74,479	39.21	14.21 ▲
Carolyn Parrish	51,853	27.30	3.76 ▼
Bonnie Crombie	43,191	22.74	–
Dipika Damerla	11,500	6.05	13.32 ▼
Frank Fang	1,822	0.96	0.25 ▼
David Shaw	1,587	0.84	1.19 ▼
Mike Matulewicz	1,188	0.63	0.33 ▲
Karam Ahmed	1,058	0.56	–
Gord Elliott	876	0.46	–
Aamir Bhatti	604	0.32	–
Ana Luisa Vasquez de Espinal	560	0.29	–
Amjad Jilani	537	0.28	–
Mohsin Khan	388	0.20	0.08 ▲
Fadi Naami	311	0.16	–
Total	189,954		

=== 2024 ===
2024 Mississauga mayoral by-election, June 10, 2024 Resignation of Bonnie Crombie
Candidate	Popular vote			Expenditures
Candidate	Votes	%	±%	Expenditures
Carolyn Parrish	43,494	31.06	–	$524,816.30
Alvin Tedjo	35,005	25.00	–	$300,278.25
Dipika Damerla	27,119	19.37	–	$576,469.83
Stephen Dasko	22,408	16.00	–	$291,998.83
David Shaw	2,843	2.03	-6.80	$4,511.51
Brian Crombie	2,242	1.60	–	$9,888.92
Frank Fang	1,694	1.21	–	$17,269.65
George Tavares	962	0.69	-4.63	$163.42
Xiao Hua Gong	598	0.43	–	$45,166.50
Diya Atassi	545	0.39	–	$8,522.66
Zulfiqar Ali	528	0.38	–	$971.23
Mike Matulewicz	424	0.30	–	none listed
Sinisa Mandrapa	417	0.30	–	$25,534.00
Sara Iqbal	359	0.26	–	$0.00
Jamie Dookie	302	0.22	–	$846.00
Nathalie Xian Yi Yan	297	0.21	–	$1,200.00
Mitchell MacEachern	238	0.17	–	$0.00
Winston Harding	206	0.15	–	$1,575.00
Mohsin Khan	170	0.12	–	$0.00
Syed Jaffery	169	0.12	–	$8,116.00
Total valid votes	140,020	99.89		
Rejected, unmarked and declined	161	0.11		
Turnout	140,181	25.67	+3.83	
Eligible voters	545,512			
Note: Candidate campaign colours are based on the prominent colour used in campaign items (signs, literature, etc.) or colours used in polling graphs and are used as a visual differentiation between candidates.
Sources: City of Mississauga

=== 2022 ===
Candidate	Vote	%
Bonnie Crombie	82,736	78.47
David Shaw	7,202	6.83
George Tavares	5,613	5.32
Derek Ramkissoon	4,012	3.81
Mohsin Khan	2,866	2.72
Melodie J. Petty	1,464	1.39
Jayesh Trivedi	1,169	1.11
Bobie Taffe	370	0.35

=== 2018 ===
Mayoral Candidate	Vote	%
Bonnie Crombie	91,422	76.68
Kevin J. Johnston	16,079	13.49
Scott E. W. Chapman	4,563	3.83
Andrew Lee	2,970	2.49
Mohsin Khan	1,458	1.22
Yasmin Pouragheli	996	0.84
Tiger Meng Wu	989	0.83
Syed Qumber Rizvi	752	0.63

=== 2014 ===
Mayoral Candidate	Vote	%
Bonnie Crombie	102,346	63.49
Steve Mahoney	46,224	28.68
Dil Muhammad	2,429	1.51
Stephen King	1,874	1.16
Masood Khan	1,254	0.78
Donald Barber	1,225	0.76
Derek Ramkissoon	1,044	0.65
Scott E. W. Chapman	868	0.54
Riazuddin Choudhry	790	0.49
Paul Fromm	775	0.48
Kevin Jackal Johnston	741	0.46
Andrew Seitz	507	0.31
Joe Lomangino	415	0.26
Grant Isaac	392	0.24
Sheraz Siddiqui	315	0.20

=== 2010 ===
Mayoral Candidate	Vote	%
Hazel McCallion	107,643	76.40
Dave Cook	10,744	7.63
George Winter	4,783	3.39
Ranjit Chahal	4,199	2.98
Ghani Ahsan	3,744	2.66
Ram Selvarajah	2,241	1.59
Peter Orphanos	2,140	1.52
Donald Barber	1,513	1.07
Paul Fromm	917	0.65
Martin Marinka	644	0.46
Bryan Robert Hallett	575	0.41
Shirley Vanden Berg	516	0.37
Ursula Keuper-Bennett	329	0.23
Andy Valenton	293	0.21
Antu Maprani Chakkunny	249	0.18
Andrew Seitz	233	0.17
Innocent Watat	139	0.10

=== 2006 ===
Mayoral Candidate	Vote	%
Hazel McCallion	98,293	91.41
Donald Barber	5,571	5.18
Roy N. Willis	3,667	3.41

=== 2003 ===
Mayoral Candidate	Vote	%
Hazel McCallion	74,719	91.64
Masood Khan	2,304	2.83
Charles Cooper	1,613	1.98
Larry J. Mancini	1,478	1.81
Dyal Chanderpaul	1,419	1.74

=== 2000 ===
Mayoral Candidate	Vote	%
Hazel McCallion	89,325	92.06
Kanwaljit Singh Kanwal	3,111	3.21
Donald Barber	2,726	2.81
Rod P. Stewart	1,866	1.92

=== 1997 ===
Mayoral Candidate	Vote	%
Hazel McCallion	65,678	94.34
Donald Barber	2,084	2.99
James Archibald Girvin	1,063	1.53
Wyman Parker	792	1.14

=== 1994 ===
Mayoral Candidate	Vote	%
Hazel McCallion	67,524	90.81
Dianna Priestman	1,898	2.55
Donald Barber	1,648	2.22
Michael John Charette	1,373	1.85
James Girvin	1,206	1.62
Ernie DesJardine	711	0.96

=== 1991 ===
91% of polls reporting

MacCallion ended up winning by a plurality of 54,158 votes.

Mayoral Candidate	Vote	%
Hazel McCallion	52,022	86.74
Dianna Hostan	3,010	5.02
Steve Dunn	2,560	4.27
Glenn R. Dean	2,383	3.97

=== 1988 ===
Mayoral Candidate	Vote	%
Hazel McCallion	Acclaimed	

=== 1985 ===
Mayoral Candidate	Vote	%
Hazel McCallion	42,220	74.61
Robert Taylor	7,604	13.44
Rick Drennan	6,761	11.95

=== 1982 ===
Mayoral Candidate	Vote	%
Hazel McCallion	48,976	71.08
Ron Searle	16,711	24.25
Doug Eland	3,215	4.67

=== 1980 ===
Mayoral Candidate	Vote	%
Hazel McCallion	Acclaimed	

=== 1978 ===
Mayoral Candidate	Vote	%
Hazel McCallion	28,005	51.51
Ron Searle	25,029	46.04
Michael Zita	1,332	2.45

=== 1976 ===
Mayoral Candidate	Vote	%
Ron Searle	15,405	33.63
Martin Dobkin	11,731	25.61
Gerry Townsend	11,340	24.76
David Culhan	6,737	14.71
Douglas Campbell	591	1.29

=== 1973 ===
Mayoral Candidate	Vote	%
Martin Dobkin	18,179	52.62
Chic Murray	15,209	44.03
Douglas Campbell	795	2.30
Eberhard Matsuchka	362	1.05

=== 1970 ===
Mayoral Candidate	Vote	%
Robert Speck	Acclaimed	

=== 1967 ===
Mayoral Candidate	Vote	%
Robert Speck	Acclaimed	
