= Martin Dobkin =

Canadian physician (born 1942)

3rd Mayor of Mississauga
- In office 1973–1976
- Preceded by: Chic Murray
- Succeeded by: Ron Searle

Personal details
- Born: Martin Lyon Dobkin; May 8, 1942 (age 84) Toronto, Ontario, Canada
- Spouse: Michele Dobkin (m. 1968)
- Children: 3
- Profession: Medical Doctor

Martin Lyon Dobkin (born May 8, 1942) is a physician and former politician, who served as Mayor of the new City of Mississauga, Ontario, from 1973 to 1976. Dobkin served as mayor when Mississauga was reincorporated as a town in 1974. He was originally a medical doctor, continuing his practice when he was mayor. He continues to work as a doctor, although a car accident in 2003 reduced his activities.

In honour of his service to the city, the Dr. Martin L. Dobkin Community Park, a large 30 acre park in central Mississauga with multiple facilities, was officially opened on June 14, 1992.

== Background ==
Dobkin was born in Toronto, Ontario, on May 8, 1942, to Irving and Mary (née Gorlitsky) Dobkin, Jewish immigrants from Russia. In 1955, at the age of 13, he moved to Cobourg, Ontario, with his family. He attended Cobourg and District Collegiate Institute. He graduated from Queen's University Medical School in 1966. This was followed by an internship at Montreal General Hospital and then a one-year residency in pediatrics at the Hospital for Sick Children in Toronto.

In 1968 he married Michele Bitton and they had 3 children - Edward, Caroline and Alain. Also in 1968 he began his medical practice as a family physician in Mississauga. and became a member of the active staff at the Mississauga Hospital. In 1970 Dobkin was appointed as coroner in the County of Peel.

== Medical career ==
In 1968, Dobkin began practising family medicine in Cooksville in the practice of Drs. Ann and J. D. Smith. In 1970, he left this practice and opened up his own office in Applewood Hills. In 1978, he purchased a property at the corner of Hurontario Street and Central Parkway West and, in conjunction with Dr. K. Malicki, founded the City Centre Family Physician Clinic. The clinic soon grew to seven family physicians, the largest family practice clinic in South Mississauga. In 1992, a new comprehensive medical building was constructed on the site and the practice continued there.

Dobkin worked in the emergency department of the Mississauga Hospital on a part-time basis for 20 years. For the first 17 years in practice, he delivered several hundred newborns. He held the position of medical director at the Tyndall Nursing Home from 1976 to 1984. He served on various committees at the Mississauga Hospital and has been a member of the Department of Family Practice since 1968.

== Politics ==
On October 1, 1973, as a political novice, he was elected as the first mayor of the newly created City of Mississauga. At 31 years of age, Dobkin became the youngest person in Canada to be elected mayor of a large city. He served a three-year term as mayor of Mississauga.

Dobkin was swept into office as the head of a "reform council" in Mississauga, which included other newcomers such as Mary-Helen Spence, David Culham, Hubert Wolf, Kaye Killaby, and Hazel McCallion.

Notable achievements during the first council term included the creation of a future development plan for the city.

Numerous properties were purchased to provide the green space and parklands for the new city. These included the acquisitions of the Rattray Marsh, Adamson House, Cawthra Elliott Estate, Jack Darling Park, Morning Dew Park, Cooksville Creek Lands, and the CVCA parkland at the mouth of the Credit River.

Libraries that were built or completed were the Burnhamthorpe, Lorne Park, and the Lakeview branches. As well, the Malton Community Centre and the Mississauga Valley Community Centre were designed and built.

During Dobkin's era, Mississauga Transit was significantly enlarged, adding a state-of-the-art transit headquarters on Central Parkway West, Canada's first articulated buses, and many other infrastructure projects.

In the 1976 municipal election, Dobkin faced city councillor Ron Searle. Dobkin, who was cast by Searle's campaign as the anti-development candidate, was defeated by Searle by about 3,000 votes.
