= Chic Murray (politician) =

Canadian politician

2nd Mayor of Mississauga
- In office 1972–1974
- Preceded by: Robert Speck
- Succeeded by: Martin Dobkin

Reeve of Toronto Township
- In office 1968–1972
- Preceded by: Robert Speck
- Succeeded by: Louis H. Parsons

Personal details
- Born: Charles Myron Murray; February 9, 1914 Toronto, Ontario, Canada
- Died: July 5, 1984 (aged 70) Mississauga, Ontario, Canada
- Spouse: Josephine Murray
- Children: 4
- Profession: Salesman

Charles Myron "Chic" Murray (February 9, 1914 – July 5, 1984) was a Canadian politician who served as the second Mayor of the Town of Mississauga, before it amalgamated with several surrounding towns to form the current City of Mississauga.

== Politics ==
Murray was elected Ward 3 councillor in Toronto Township in 1957. He became deputy reeve of Toronto Township from 1959 to 1968, and Reeve of the Town of Mississauga from 1968 to 1972. Murray took over as Mayor of the Town of Mississauga following the death of Robert Speck, who died while in office in 1972. Following the formation of the City of Mississauga, Murray lost the City of Mississauga mayoral election to medical doctor Martin Dobkin in 1974. Murray briefly served as a City Councillor for Ward 3 after winning a by-election in 1975, before retiring from politics in 1976.

== Personal life ==
Chic Murray was born in Toronto in 1914 and worked as a salesman until he entered public life. He married Josephine Keith on September 24, 1938 and had four children. Murray died in Mississauga in 1984. The Chic Murray Indoor Arena at the Burnhamthorpe Community Centre in Mississauga is named in his honour.
