= Toronto Township =

Toronto Township may refer to:

== Canada ==
- Toronto Township, Ontario, now part of Mississauga

== United States ==
- Toronto Township, Woodson County, Kansas
