= Ron Searle =

English-born Canadian soldier, publisher, and politician

4th Mayor of Mississauga
- In office 1976–1978
- Preceded by: Martin Dobkin
- Succeeded by: Hazel McCallion

Personal details
- Born: Ronald Alfred Searle; July 19, 1919 Southampton, Hampshire, England
- Died: August 29, 2015 (aged 96) Mississauga, Ontario, Canada
- Spouse: Mollie Searle (m. 1949–1999)
- Children: 1
- Profession: Publisher

Military service
- Allegiance: Canada
- Branch/service: Canadian Army
- Years of service: 1939-1945
- Rank: Sergeant
- Unit: Toronto Scottish Regiment

Ronald Alfred Searle (July 19, 1919 – August 29, 2015) was an English-born Canadian soldier, publisher, and politician who served as the fourth mayor of Mississauga, Ontario from 1976 to 1978.

== Early life ==
Ronald Alfred Searle was born in Southampton, England, to Ruby and Theodore Searle on July 19, 1919. His mother was a seamstress and his father was a purser with the White Star Line and a seaman with the Royal Navy during World War I. The family relocated to Toronto, where the family had relatives.

=== Military career ===
After joining the Toronto Scottish militia in the mid-1930s, Searle later signed up with the Toronto Scottish Regiment immediately upon Canada declaring war against Nazi Germany in September 1939. During World War II, Searle landed twice in France, once at Brest and once at Normandy. He was later wounded at Falaise in Ardennes when he took three machine gun bullets to his leg.

=== Post-war life and family ===
After the war he began a career in magazine publishing. On December 10, 1949, he married his wife, Mollie, and together they raised one son, Mark William Searle. The Searles were married for 50 years until Mollie Searle's death in 1999.

== Political career ==
Searle first entered politics when he was elected president of the Orchard Heights Homeowners Association in 1959.

In 1962, he was elected to the Mississauga town council and served for fourteen years. While on council, Searle fiercely debated with sitting mayor Martin Dobkin in both municipal and regional council meetings on many issues, including increased municipal funding for child care and legal aid. Dobkin, who referred to Searle as "the official leader of the opposition", noted that despite the political opposition, the two enjoyed a friendly personal relationship.

Searle was elected mayor in 1976 amid a corruption scandal in the municipal government and a massive real estate boom throughout the city. With increased home prices driving lower-income citizens out of Mississauga, Searle made affordable housing a central issue of his administration and told a reporter for the Toronto Star shortly after his electoral victory that "[his] concern for [affordable housing] overrides all other concerns." Throughout his term in office, he lobbied for cheaper homes and opposed the federal government's cuts to housing grants.

Searle ran for re-election at the end of his term in 1978, but lost to former Streetsville mayor Hazel McCallion with a final tally of 28,005 to 25,029 votes. He later made another unsuccessful bid for the mayoralty in 1982, but was defeated by McCallion again.

While still a councillor, Searle also ran as a Progressive Conservative candidate for the riding of Peel in the 1965 federal election. He finished a distant second to Liberal candidate Bruce Beer.

== Later life and death ==
Following his failed 1982 election bid, Searle remained active in the community. He would often represent homeowners' interests at city hall, and was a frequent participant in veterans' events and events at the Port Credit Yacht Club.

In 2007 he was highly critical of Tim Peterson's installation as the Progressive Conservative Party of Ontario candidate for Mississauga South after crossing the floor from the Ontario Liberal Party, remarking that the process was "a violation of the democratic principles the [Progressive] Conservative Party has stood for over the years".

In late August 2015, Searle was admitted to Mississauga Hospital for pneumonia. He died in hospital on August 29, 2015, at the age of 96. The City of Mississauga set up an official book of condolences at the Mississauga Civic Centre and lowered the flags at all city-owned buildings in his honour from August 29 to September 11, 2015.

== Honours ==
The following honours were conferred on Searle:

- (Canada) Queen Elizabeth II Golden Jubilee Medal
- (Canada) Queen Elizabeth II Diamond Jubilee Medal
- (France) Legion of Honour
