= Robert Speck (politician) =

Canadian politician (1915–1972)

1st Mayor of Mississauga
- In office 1968–1972
- Preceded by: New position
- Succeeded by: Chic Murray (interim)

Reeve of Toronto Township
- In office 1960–1967
- Preceded by: Mary Fix
- Succeeded by: Chic Murray

Personal details
- Born: Robert William Speck; April 16, 1915 Toronto Township, Ontario, Canada
- Died: April 5, 1972 (aged 56) Mississauga, Ontario, Canada
- Spouse: Enid Elizabeth Pattison
- Children: 3

Robert William Speck (April 16, 1915 – April 5, 1972) was a Canadian politician who was the first Mayor of the Town of Mississauga, and the town's only elected mayor. Speck died while in office and Reeve Chic Murray was appointed by the town's council to take his place.

Robert Speck Parkway, a short road in central Mississauga leading to Square One Shopping Centre, is named in his honour.
