= Sheridan College =

Public college in Ontario, Canada

The Sheridan College Institute of Technology and Advanced Learning
- Other name: Sheridan College
- Former names: Sheridan College of Applied Arts and Technology (1967–2003)
- Type: Public college
- Established: 1967; 59 years ago
- Academic affiliations: CBIE; CICan; CILECT; NASAD OCAS; Polytechnics Canada
- Chancellor: Vacant
- President: Cindy Gouveia
- Students: 26,500 (14,638 FTE; 2025)
- Location: Brampton; Oakville; Mississauga; Ontario, Canada; 43°28′8″N 79°42′0″W
- Campus: Suburban and urban
- Colours
- Nickname: Bruins
- Sporting affiliations: CCAA – OCAA
- Mascot: Bruno the Bruin
- Website: sheridancollege.ca

The Sheridan College Institute of Technology and Advanced Learning, operating as Sheridan College (or simply Sheridan), is a public college with three campuses in Oakville, Brampton, and Mississauga, Ontario, Canada.

Founded in 1967, Sheridan is known for academic programs in creative writing and publishing, animation and illustration, film and design, business, applied computing, and engineering technology, among others. The Davis Campus in Brampton is its original location and its largest campus by student enrolment. Sheridan's administration is based at the Trafalgar Campus in Oakville, and the newer Hazel McCallion Campus was opened in Mississauga City Centre in 2011.

== History ==
=== Founding ===
Sheridan College was established in 1967 and named for the hamlet of Sheridan (established in 1858 and named for British playwright Richard Brinsley Sheridan) on the border of Peel and Halton County (Winston Churchill and QEW). Sheridan's first home was at the old Brampton High School on Centre Street North between Church Street East and McCaul Street. The School of Graphic Design was located in Brampton, Ontario until 1970, when it moved to the new campus in Oakville, Ontario. The Brampton campus was a converted public high school that had previously been in condemned status until re-fitted for use by Sheridan College. The school and area were subsequently replaced by residential homes. The new Oakville location was still under construction when classes began in the fall of 1970. The classes were held in a large open area under triangular skylights which allowed excellent lighting for the students. The photography department used a well equipped photo studio area and darkrooms for processing film and prints. That building has become merged with many other structures as extensive expansion of the campus has occurred on an ongoing basis. The main courses taught that year were graphic design, fashion design, photography and animation.

=== Contributions to animation ===
In the 1960s and early 1970s, the Canadian animation industry was little formed and virtually non-existent, excepting animation pioneers of the National Film Board, and such Canadian studios as Crawley Films in Ottawa and The Guest Group in Toronto, a group of creative companies owned and run by Al Guest.

The Canadian animation landscape began to change in the late 1960s with Rocket Robin Hood, a Canadian animated series produced by Al Guest and his partner Jean Mathieson. In 1968 President Porter organized the school's first course in classical animation, even though at the time there was little evidence of demand for graduates. The school took advantage of the closing of Al Guest's studio following the production of Rocket Robin Hood and were able to buy up the cameras, animation and editing equipment. Subsequently, Guest and Mathieson served as creative advisors to Sheridan and hired a number of Sheridan graduates as key personnel for their new studio Rainbow Animation.

In 1984, Sheridan student Jon Minnis created the short animation piece Charade. The five-minute film was animated by Minnis with Pantone markers on paper during a single three-month summer term at Sheridan College. The film won the Academy Award for Best Animated Short Film at the 57th Academy Awards. As Sheridan's animation department continued to grow, it produced hundreds of animators into Canadian and international studios, at one point in 1996 being called "the Harvard of animation schools" on "a worldwide basis" by animator Michael Hirsh. A significant number of graduates have held key positions at Walt Disney Animation Studios, Don Bluth Productions, Pixar Animation Studios, and DreamWorks Animation, both for traditional and CGI animation. Sheridan graduates include seven Academy Award nominees and two winners, including Domee Shi, the first woman to direct a Pixar animated short.

Animation faculty and alumni have also been recognized at the Emmy awards, including animation professor Kaj Pindal and alumni Jim Bryson, Bobby Chiu and Adam Jeffcoat.

In June 2018, animation alumnus Jon Klassen was named to the Order of Canada in recognition of his contributions to children's literature. Klassen is the author and illustrator of the award-winning book, This is Not My Hat.

In 2018, Sheridan's animation program celebrated the 50th anniversary of its founding. Today, the program aims to foster the same innovative and creative spirit in its current students as it did 50 years ago. Students now earn a four-year Bachelor's Degree in Animation, and post-graduate programs in Computer Animation, Visual Effects and Character Animation are also available.

In 2019, Sheridan was ranked as the top animation school in the world outside the United States by Animation Career Review.

In 2024 Sheridan College's dependence on international student enrolment was blamed for the cancellation of 40 programs and major layoffs.

=== Unsuccessful bid for university status ===
Former President Jeff Zabudsky announced in 2012 that Sheridan College would seek to become a university by 2020. The college began implementing several changes to meet the non-binding criteria of a university as set by Universities Canada including: the establishment of an academic senate to set policy, increasing the number of degree-level courses, and increasing the number of instructors with master's and doctoral degrees. The college appointed former Mayor of Mississauga Hazel McCallion as its first chancellor in 2016.

In 2018, it was announced that Sheridan will open a new campus in Brampton in partnership with Ryerson University (now named Toronto Metropolitan University). The campus will be located on south-east corner of Church Street West and Mill Street North in Brampton. The new campus will focus on delivering programs in science, technology, engineering, arts and mathematics (STEAM). However, this plan was cancelled in 2019.

In 2019, under the leadership of President Janet Morrison, the college unveiled a new five-year strategic plan that sets out a new vision for Sheridan: to bring together key elements of colleges, polytechnics and universities to create a new, standard-setting model of higher education.

=== Focus on International Students ===
In the late 2000's Sheridan began focusing on increasing international enrolment. By 2010 roughly 10% of college enrolment were foreign students. Over the next six years Sheridan added over 4,500 more, raising the percentage of international students to nearly 30% in 2016-17. The increase led to community concerns regarding housing, access to healthcare and food insecurity. In the following six years the college enrolled an additional 5,591, the eighth highest number for Canadian post-secondary institutions in 2022-23.

The rise in human trafficking in Brampton, particularly targeting international students, led Sheridan to raise the issue with students as early as 2019. In 2021, it was reported "the top brass at Sheridan College" refused to acknowledge the risk of human trafficking to international students. In 2022, the college produced a webinar to educate faculty and staff that Sheridan campuses are located in human trafficking "hot spots", created a human trafficking resource handout for their students and worked with community services on human trafficking initiatives. In 2024, Brampton City Council passed a resolution aimed at tackling human trafficking of international students in their City, with reporting naming Sheridan as a popular destination. Mayor Patrick Brown in October first acknowledged the issue publicly, noting that Brampton has the highest number of international students in the country, while asking for federal and provincial help. Months later Indian authorities alleged widespread human trafficking of international students.

== Academics ==
=== Faculties ===
Sheridan is composed of four academic faculties in addition to its Continuing and Professional Studies programs. Its faculties are:

- Faculty of Animation, Arts and Design
- Faculty of Applied Health and Community Studies
- Faculty of Applied Science and Technology
- Pilon School of Business

=== Programs ===
The college has more than 130 programs leading to degrees, certificates, diplomas, and post-graduate diplomas. Sheridan College has a music theatre performance program, undergraduate and post-graduate film programs, and a craft and design program. They have courses in business, animation, illustration, applied computing, engineering technology, community studies, and liberal studies, among others. In 2012, art and design programs within Sheridan's Faculty of Animation, Arts and Design were recognized by the National Association of Schools of Art and Design (NASAD) to have "substantially equivalent" membership status. (NASAD's nomenclature for non U.S. members) Sheridan is only the second art institution in Canada to achieve this status.

Sheridan has long been partnered academically with the University of Toronto Mississauga (UTM) and offers a joint dual degree program known as Art and Art History, where students earn both a diploma from Sheridan and degree from the University of Toronto. From the year 2000 to 2021, Sheridan offered a joint program in Communication, Culture, Information and Technology (CCIT) with UTM, however it moved exclusively to the university in 2024. Until 2026, Theatre & Drama Studies was offered as a joint program but likewise moved to UTM exclusively after 32 years of partnership due to academic restructuring at Sheridan. Students in joint programs can take the UTM Shuttle Bus to and from Sheridan's Trafalgar Campus.

== Research and entrepreneurship centres ==
=== Centre for Advanced Manufacturing and Design Technologies (CAMDT) ===
The Centre for Advanced Manufacturing and Design Technologies (CAMDT), located at the Brampton campus, is a 40,000 sq. ft. facility housing highly specialized manufacturing and design equipment. CAMDT allows Sheridan and its industry partners to collaborate on addressing challenges in the manufacturing sector, while developing graduates with the skills and practical knowledge to make an immediate and positive impact in the workplace.

=== Centre for Elder Research ===
The stated mission of Sheridan's Centre for Elder Research is to enhance quality of life for older individuals, by developing, testing, and implementing new and realistic solutions to improve the day-to-day experiences of elders and their families. In 2018, the Centre was awarded $178,856 from the Natural Sciences and Engineering Research Council of Canada to further explore how emerging technologies, such as virtual reality tools, can be leveraged to enhance the health and well-being of older adults residing in congregate living facilities such as long-term care homes.

=== Screen Industries Research and Training Center (SIRT) ===
Opened at Pinewood Toronto Studios in 2010, Screen Industries Research and Training Center (SIRT) is a digital media sound stage and post-production facility that focuses on 2D and 3D stereoscopic production processes. SIRT was conceived and launched by Sheridan College to operate in connection to the creative industries and three levels of the Canadian government. The Center's stated mission is to conduct high-level research on film, digital cinema, and high-definition technologies in all levels of production and display. The University of Waterloo announced in July 2010 that funding was awarded for joint research between their film department and SIRT.

In 2013, SIRT was designated as the first digital media Technology Access Centre in Ontario, supported through funding from the Natural Sciences and Engineering Research Council of Canada's (NSERC) College-Community Innovation program. In 2018, this funding was renewed for an additional five years to support further applied research and industry collaboration at SIRT.

=== Centre for Mobile Innovation (CMI) ===
The Centre for Mobile Innovation is a research facility for faculty and students to create solutions in collaboration with community and industry partners in the area of Internet of things (IoT), wearable computing, augmented/virtual reality (AR/VR), and/or machine learning.

=== Canadian Music Theatre Project (CMTP) ===
The Canadian Music Theatre Project (CMTP) was established by Michael Rubinoff, and was an incubator for new musical theatre works by Canadian and international composers, lyricists and book-writers. CMTP connects creative teams with talented students who help bring new characters to life, creating an environment for material to be tested and rewritten. Three or four projects are selected each year, with a five-week workshop period culminating in staged readings in front of a 200-person audience of industry professionals and theatre enthusiasts. Since its inception in 2011, 225 students, 34 writers and composers and 25 guest directors and music directors have participated in the creation of 19 new musicals.

==== Connection to Come From Away ====
Come From Away began its life and development at the Canadian Music Theatre Project in 2012. Over two seasons, the CMTP provided the creative team 12 weeks of development time and support, with exceptional student performers, crew, and creative teams. Access to onsite recording facilities to create demo recordings aided in the continuing development of the musical. The workshops culminated in test performance with a full band and live audiences at Sheridan and the Panasonic Theatre in Toronto. The full, two-act musical was produced by Theatre Sheridan the following year. Come From Away was part of the National Alliance for Musical Theatre and Goodspeed Festivals of New Musicals. It was optioned by Tony-Award winning producers Junkyard Dog Productions.

As a credited producer on the musical, Sheridan became the first postsecondary institution to be nominated for Tony Award when Come From Away was recognized with a nomination for Best New Musical Tony in 2017.

=== Entrepreneurship, Discovery and Growth Engine (EDGE) Hub ===
The EDGE hub offers training, mentorship, co-working space and support to access funding to early-stage entrepreneurs. Since it opened its doors in 2017, over 40 start-ups have been supported, 13 of which reside in the co-working space at Sheridan's Mississauga campus.

== Campuses ==
Sheridan College has three campuses located in Ontario. Residential dorms are currently only at Trafalgar and Davis campuses. A shuttle bus pilot program to link the three campuses has been discontinued.

=== Davis Campus (Brampton) ===
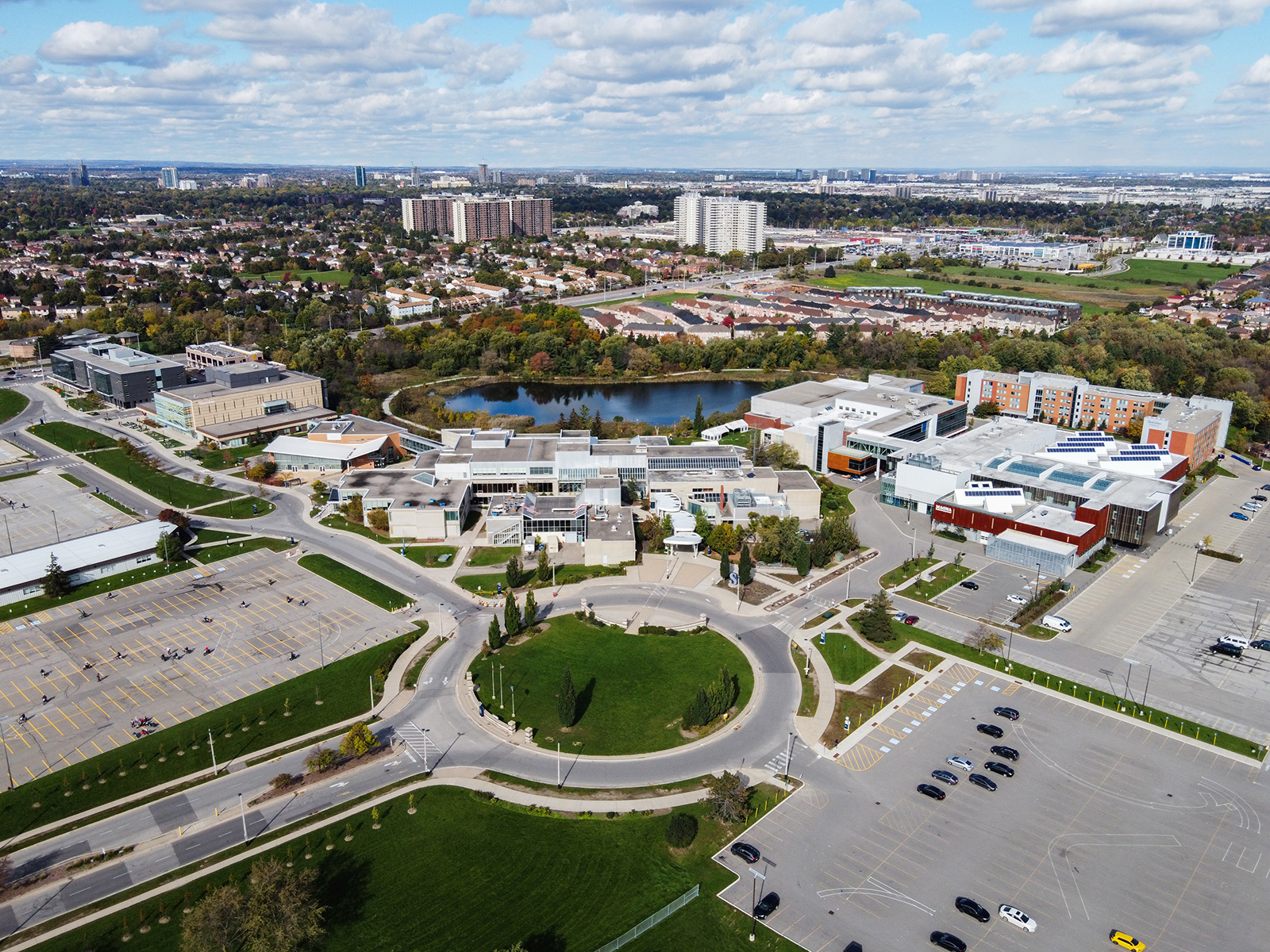
Sheridan College Davis Campus

The Davis campus is located in Brampton (7899 McLaughlin Road) completed in 1977, and serves approximately 12,167 students. The former name is Brampton Campus. It is named in 1992 after former premier of Ontario William G. Davis, who created the college system and was from Brampton himself.

This campus is home to Sheridan's community services, engineering & technology, and applied health programs. The school includes three major centres: the Centre of Mobile Innovation, the Centre of Advanced Manufacturing and Design Technologies, and the Centre for Healthy Communities.

Sheridan's Skills Training Centre relocated to the Davis Campus and was upgraded in 2017. The centre has 130,000 square feet of workshops, classrooms, facilities, machinery and equipment for the apprenticeship and pre-trades programs at Sheridan. Programs include:

- Apprenticeship programs: Electrician – Construction & Maintenance, General Machinist, Industrial Mechanic Millwright, Tool and Die Maker
- Electrical Techniques
- Electrical Engineering Technician
- Electrical Engineering Degree
- AI/ML Graduate Certificate
- Mechanical Technician – Tool Making
- Mechanical Techniques – Plumbing
- Mechanical Techniques – Tool and Die Maker
- Mechanical Engineering Degree
- Welding Techniques
- Dual-Credit programs

=== Trafalgar Campus (Oakville) ===
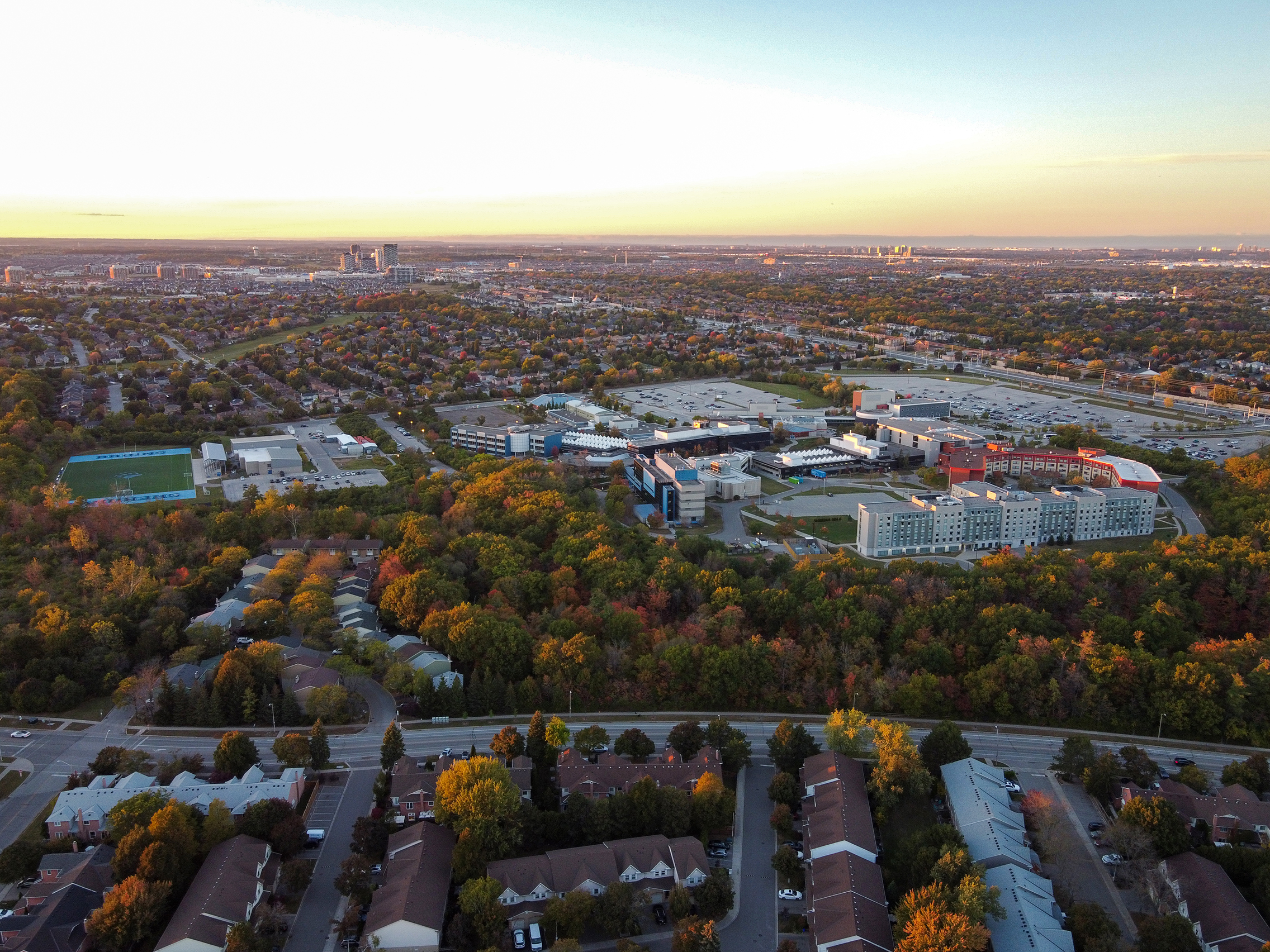
Trafalgar Campus of Sheridan College in 2023

Located in Oakville (1430 Trafalgar Road), the Trafalgar Campus is the main campus of the Sheridan College, which serves 9,610 students. This campus is the home of the Faculty of Animation, Arts and Design, and is Canada's largest art school.

This campus includes two performance theatres which hold performances annually. Trafalgar campus is also home to the Bruins soccer, rugby and cross country teams.

=== Hazel McCallion Campus (Mississauga) ===
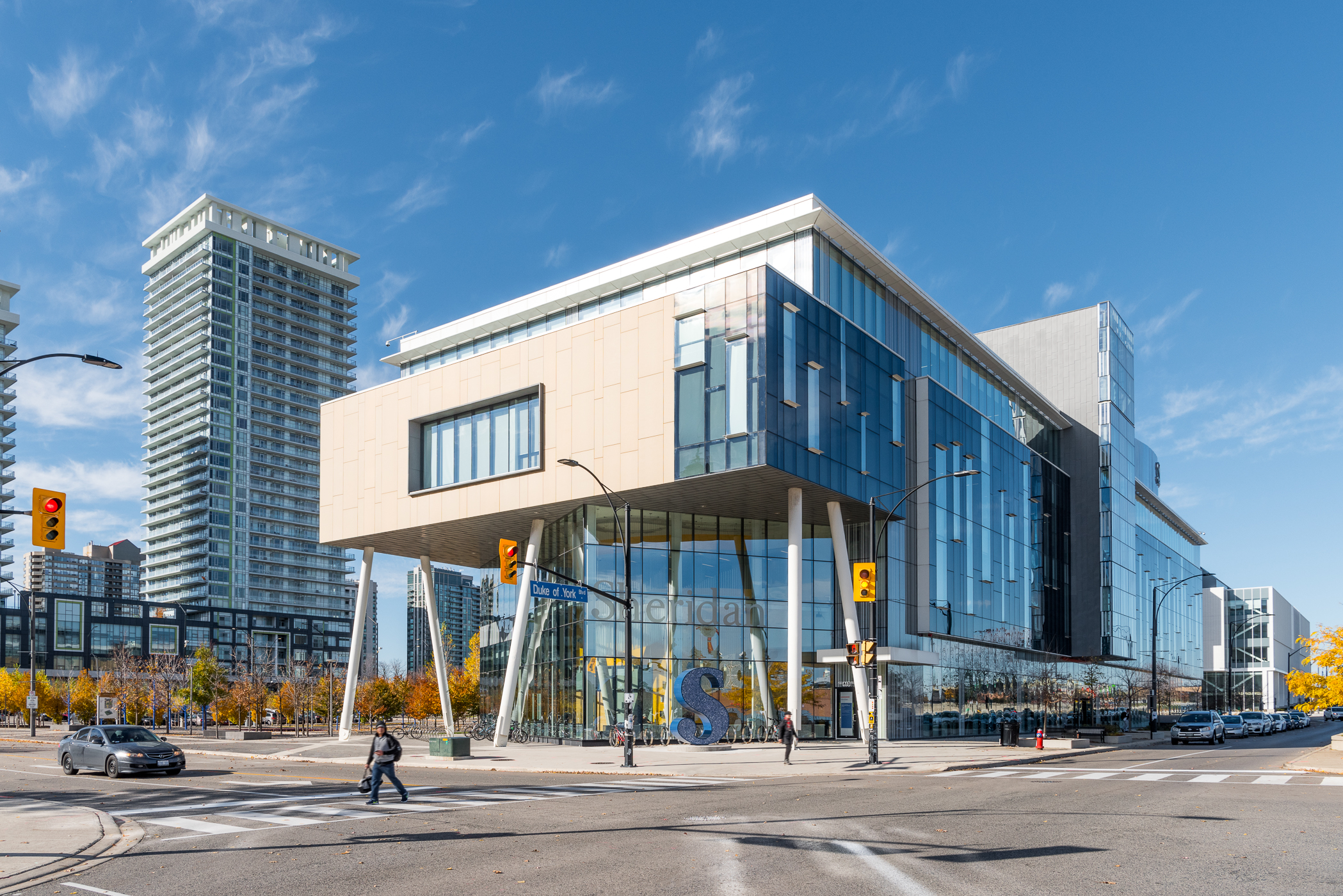
Hazel McCallion Campus

The Hazel McCallion campus (HMC) is located in Mississauga (4180 Duke of York Boulevard), in the city centre adjacent to Square One Shopping Centre. It opened in September 2011. The initial phase of development was intended for approximately 2,000 students, with an additional 3,700 students accommodated with the opening of HMC's second building in January 2017. In 2017, HMC opened a new wing, increasing enrolment capacity to over 5,500 students.

The Pilon School of Business is located here. Programs in Advertising, Marketing and Visual Merchandising complement the business diploma, degree and graduate certificate programs. The new wing is home to architectural programs focusing on sustainably built environments. It also includes a Centre for Creative Thinking and a gallery space.

A new 70,000-square-foot student and athletics expansion at HMC includes numerous new student life, food services, recreation and athletics spaces. The project is a collaboration between Sheridan, Sheridan Athletics, and the Sheridan Student Union.

== Student life ==
=== Publications ===
The journalism program produces the Sheridan Sun Online, a news and information site maintained by Sheridan's journalism students.

=== Athletics ===
An informal hockey team was formed by students in Sheridan's first year of operation, 1967. The team officially joined the newly created Ontario Colleges Athletic Association (OCAA) the next year, along with 20 other new hockey teams from throughout Canada. The Bruins won their Central Division, also participating in the very first Provincial Championship tournament. The hockey team was discontinued after a successful history in 1992, with the void filled by other Bruins Varsity sports. Apart from intramural sports, Sheridan College currently has men's and women's Varsity teams for basketball, soccer, rugby, cross country running, and volleyball. They are still associated with the OCAA.

== People ==
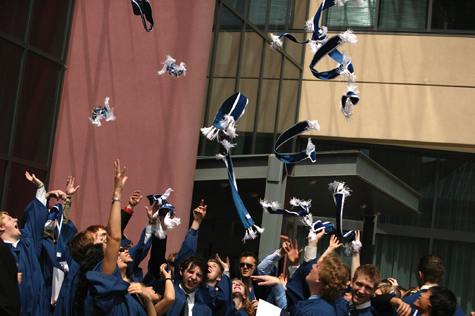
Sheridan College graduates

=== Presidents ===
Date	Name
1967–1981	Jack Porter
1981–1988	Don Shields
1988–1996	Mary Hofstetter
1997–2001	Sheldon Levy
2001–2010	Robert Turner
2010–2016	Jeff Zabudsky
2016–2018	Mary Preece
2018–2025	Janet Morrison
2026–present	Cindy Gouveia

=== Notable alumni ===
- Kent Angus, businessman and Paul Loicq Award winner
- Danny Antonucci, creator of Ed, Edd n Eddy
- Jeanette Atwood, cartoonist, animator
- Alan Barillaro, Pixar animator and director of Piper, Winner of the Best Animated Short Film at the 89th Academy Awards
- Charles E. Bastien, animation director
- Allie X, singer
- Charles Bonifacio, animator
- Vera Brosgol, cartoonist
- Svetlana Chmakova, comics creator
- Sheldon Cohen, animator and children's book illustrator
- Nick Cross, Canadian animator
- James Cunningham, comedian
- Dean DeBlois, animator and director (Walt Disney Animation Studios, DreamWorks Pictures)
- Robb Denovan, animator
- Trish Doan, musician (metal band Kittie)
- Ian D'Sa, musician (Billy Talent)
- Kathryn Durst, illustrator and artist
- Elicser Elliott, artist, author, animator
- Paul Epp, industrial designer
- Tom Freda, photographer, activist
- Michel Gagné, animator
- Wayne Gilbert, animator
- Paul Gilligan, comic strip writer
- Christopher Guinness, art director, animator, multi-Addy Award Winner
- Bryce Hallett, animator/director, Frog Feet Productions
- Steve Heineman, artist
- Philip Hoffman, filmmaker, York University Professor
- Bob Jaques, animator
- Trevor Jimenez, Academy-award nominated animator
- Maggie Kang, Academy-award nominated co-director of KPop Demon Hunters (2025)
- Jon Klassen, illustrator and children's book author
- John Kricfalusi, creator of The Ren and Stimpy Show
- Thao Lam, author and illustrator
- Jeff Lemire, cartoonist
- Troy Little, animator, graphic-novel creator
- Charmaine Lurch, artist and educator
- Glenn McQueen, supervisor of digital animation and supervising character animator (Pixar, PDI)
- Alex Milne, comic book artist
- Kent Monkman, artist
- Steve Murray, known as Chip Zdarsky, comic book artist
- Sidhu Moose Wala, Punjabi pop star
- Lynne Naylor, animator
- Gary Pearson, editorial cartoonist
- Nik Ranieri, Disney animator
- Graham Roumieu, author & illustrator
- Kathy Shaidle, author
- Domee Shi, Pixar writer and director of Bao, Winner of the Best Animated Short Film at the 91st Academy Awards, and director and co-writer of Turning Red. Also Academy-award nominated for Best Animated Feature as director and producer of Elio
- David Soren, DreamWorks animator and director of Turbo
- Don Sparrow, editorial illustrator
- Michael Therriault, actor
- Chris Williams, Disney animator and co-director of Moana and director of Big Hero 6, Winner of the Best Animated Feature at the 87th Academy Awards
- Steve "Spaz" Williams, animator
- Amalia Williamson, actress
- Steve Wolfhard, storyboard artist for Adventure Time
- Andrew Wright, artist
- Virginia to Vegas, singer, songwriter from Virginia but was raised in Guelph, Ontario
- Sydney Elaine Butler, founder of Accessible Creates

== See also ==
- Canadian government scientific research organizations
- Canadian industrial research and development organizations
- Canadian Interuniversity Sport
- Canadian university scientific research organizations
- Higher education in Ontario
- List of colleges in Ontario
