= Paul Epp =

Canadian designer and academic (born 1949)

- Born: 1949; La Glace, Alberta, Canada
- Education: Sheridan College School of Design
- Known for: industrial designer, educator

Paul Epp RCA (born 1949) is a Canadian professor and industrial designer from Toronto, Ontario.

== Career ==
Born 1949 in La Glace, Alberta, Epp is a graduate of Sheridan College School of Design. Since 1993 he has been a professor of industrial design at OCAD University in Toronto.

He has focused on the use of wood in design. His work shows a strong influence from Scandinavian design of the 20th century.

He has received the Best of Canada Design Award in 1998. He is also represented at the Canadian Museum of History in Ottawa, Ontario.

Paul Epp is an elected member of the Royal Canadian Academy of Arts (RCA).
