= F.B. McFarren =

Frederick Bruce McFarren (born October 25, 1889, date of death unknown) was born in Toronto. His father was in the wholesale flour and grain business, purchasing the output of several mills and selling under his own brand name.

== Biography ==
One of the best known figures in Canada's clay brick industry, McFarren began his career on May 23, 1904 in Corticelli's silk firm tying up parcels. Staying with Corticelli's for 3 years he then went on the road for Mussen's construction equipment. Then in 1912 became a purchasing agent for McKenzie, Mann and Company working on the Mount Royal tunnel in Montreal.

In 1914 McFarren was approached by a syndicate that had the idea of starting a brick company. He then began to build the old Interprovincial Brick Company in Cheltenham on March 1, 1914. Five months later the first brick came out of the kiln, a record in those days.

McFarren operated the Interprovincial Brick Company for 14 years, commencing in 1914, with the exception of part of 1915 and all of 1916 which was spent in the Canadian military service as a junior officer with the 3rd. Battalion, C.E.F., at Ypres, and the 1st. Canadian Trench Mortar Battery on the Somme. He was invalided home from the military after Christmas of 1916, and while in and out of hospital, resumed management of the company.

In 1928, control of his brick company was acquired by Cooksville Brick. Later in 1954 it came into the hands of E.P. Taylor interests and then became part of the Domtar chain, but McFarren remained in management until at least 1955, when he oversaw the conversion of his plant from coal fuel to natural gas. .

In April 1929 McFarren purchased the Streetsville brick plant, renaming to McFarren Brick, just prior to the Great Depression. With times difficult and a drop in demand for bricks of about 90% by 1932. McFarren constructed an entirely new plant. At the time was modern and efficient and kept up to date. It replaced to a large extent human muscle with automatic machinery. F. B. McFarren Memorial Park in Streetsville is named after him.
