= Robb Denovan =

Canadian animator (born 1978)

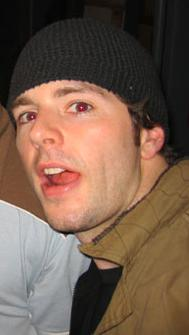
Robb Denovan in 2004

Robb Denovan (aliases: R. Deadly, Ron Donovan, Robbo Choyan etc.) is an animator from Canada who has won international acclaim for his work. He currently lives in London, England.

Robb was born to Jack and Janet Denovan on June 1, 1978, in Carleton Place, Ontario. He attended St. Mary's Public School and Carleton Place High School.

Robb studied at Sheridan College in Oakville, Ontario, from 1997 to 2001, and got his first big break as an animator in 2004, when he worked on the Oscar-winning National Film Board of Canada short film Ryan. He later worked on The Wild, a project for Disney. His next big project took him to New Zealand, where he worked under Peter Jackson on the award-winning film King Kong.

Currently, Robb works as an animator for Pixar and his work can be seen in Cars 2, Brave and Monsters University.

Robb has also engaged in, and done popular art for, such social groups as Gentlemen's Club and Medical Architects.

== Filmography ==
Animation department

- Finding Dory (directing animator) - 2016
- Inside Out (animator) -2015
- Monsters University (animator) - 2013
- Brave (animator) - 2012
- Cars 2 (animator) - 2011
- La Luna (animator) - 2011
- The Wolfman (animator) - 2010
- Harry Potter and the Half-Blood Prince (animator - uncredited) - 2009
- 10,000 BC (lead animator) - 2008
- The Chronicles of Narnia: Prince Caspian (lead animator) - 2008
- The Backyardigans (additional animator) - 2006-2007
- Surly Squirrel (Short) (animator - as Rob Denovan) - 2005
- Ryan (Documentary short) (animator) - 2004

Visual effects

- Clash of the Titans (lead animator: MPC) - 2010
- 10,000 BC (animator: MPC) - 2008
- The Wild (animator) - 2006
- King Kong (animator) - 2005
