= Janet Morrison =

Canadian academic administrator

President of Memorial University of Newfoundland
- Incumbent
- Assumed office August 11, 2025
- Preceded by: Vianne Timmons

8th President of Sheridan College
- In office June 11, 2018 – August 11, 2025
- Chancellor: Hazel McCallion
- Preceded by: Mary Preece
- Succeeded by: Rajan Sandhu (Interim)

Personal details
- Children: 2
- Education: Bowling Green State University

Janet Kathleen Morrison is a Canadian academic administrator currently serving as the President and Vice-Chancellor of Memorial University of Newfoundland. She was previously the vice provost of students at York University and the 8th President and Vice-Chancellor of Sheridan College . On April 30, 2025 it was announced she would become the President and Vice-Chancellor of the Memorial University of Newfoundland and she formally took position of the role on August 11, 2025.

== Career ==
Morrison completed a Ph.D. in higher education at the Bowling Green State University in August 1997. Her dissertation was titled, Correlates and Predictors of Safer Sexual Behavior Among Canadian Undergraduate University Students. C. Carney Strange was her doctoral advisor.

Morrison worked in student affairs and taught at the University of Guelph, Bowling Green State University, Medical College of Ohio, and George Brown College. She joined York University where she worked for 17 years in several roles before being promoted to vice provost of students. Morrison joined Sheridan College in 2016 as the provost and vice president. On June 11, 2018, she became its 8th president and vice chancellor.

== Personal life ==
Morrison has two children.
