= Hazel McCallion =

Canadian politician (1921–2023)

Hazel McCallion CM OOnt
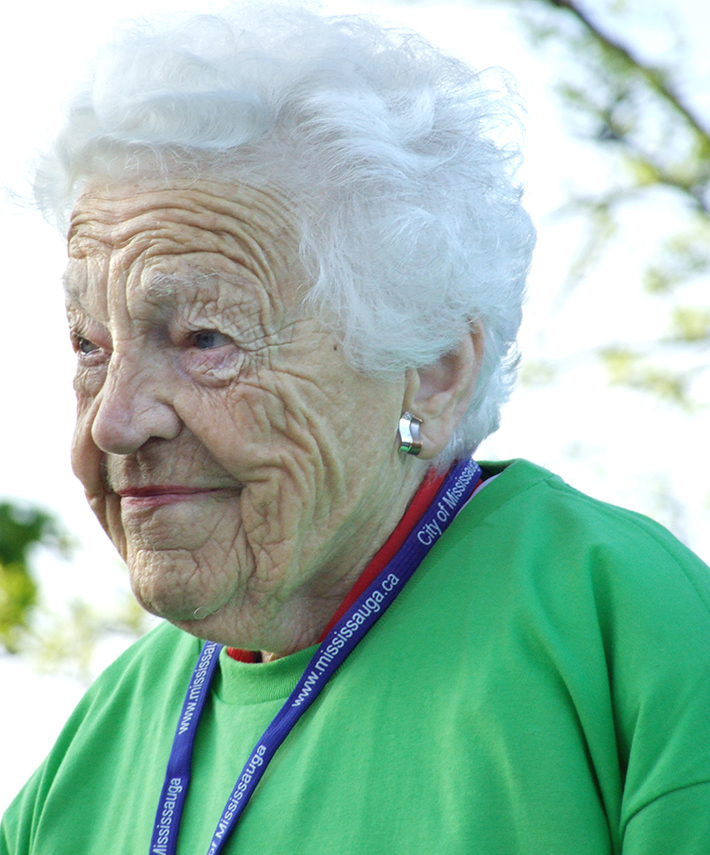
- McCallion in 2010

1st Chancellor of Sheridan College
- In office June 6, 2016 – January 29, 2023
- President: Mary Preece; Janet Morrison
- Preceded by: Position established

5th Mayor of Mississauga
- In office December 1, 1978 – November 30, 2014
- Preceded by: Ron Searle
- Succeeded by: Bonnie Crombie

3rd Mayor of Streetsville
- In office January 5, 1970 – December 31, 1973
- Preceded by: William Tolton
- Succeeded by: Position discontinued

Personal details
- Born: Hazel Mary Muriel Journeaux; February 14, 1921 Port Daniel, Quebec, Canada
- Died: January 29, 2023 (aged 101) Mississauga, Ontario, Canada
- Party: Independent
- Spouse: Sam McCallion (m. 1951; died 1997)
- Children: 3
- Profession: Businesswoman; politician

Hazel Mary Muriel McCallion CM OOnt (née Journeaux; February 14, 1921 – January 29, 2023) was a Canadian politician who served as the fifth mayor of Mississauga. First elected in November 1978, McCallion was mayor for 36 years until her retirement in 2014, making her the longest-serving mayor in the city's history. She was a successful candidate in twelve municipal elections, having been acclaimed twice and re-elected ten times. She was nicknamed "Hurricane Hazel" for her outspoken political style with reference to the hurricane of 1954, which had a considerable impact. When the 1979 Mississauga train derailment occurred early in her tenure, she helped oversee evacuation of 200,000 residents from the resulting explosion, fire, and spill of hazardous chemicals.

Before marriage, McCallion played professional women's ice hockey while attending school in Montreal, then worked for engineering firm Canadian Kellogg, and was transferred to Toronto in 1942. She moved to Streetsville in 1951, and left the business world in 1967 to pursue politics. She served as mayor of Streetsville from 1970 to 1973, prior to its amalgamation into Mississauga. Following her tenure as mayor of Mississauga, McCallion remained an active public figure, serving as the first chancellor of Sheridan College, on the Greater Toronto Airport Authority board, and as a special advisor to the Ontario government.

McCallion received multiple honours including the Order of Canada in 2005, the Order of Ontario in 2020, the Queen Elizabeth II Golden Jubilee Medal in 2002, the Queen Elizabeth II Diamond Jubilee Medal in 2012, and honorary doctorate of law degrees from the University of Toronto, and Ryerson University. She died at 101, and was given a state funeral on what would have been her 102nd birthday.

== Early life and career ==
Hazel Mary Muriel Journeaux was born on February 14, 1921, in Port Daniel, on the Gaspé Coast of Quebec. Her father, Herbert Armand Journeaux (1879–1944), owned a fishing and canning company. Her mother, Amanda Maude Travers (1876–1955), was a homemaker and ran the family farm. The family included two older sisters and two older brothers. After graduating from Quebec High School, she attended business secretarial school in Quebec City and Montreal.

Journeaux began playing ice hockey in the late 1920s in Port Daniel with her two sisters, and was a forward on their team. She then joined a professional women's hockey team while attending school in Montreal, receiving $5 per game. The team was sponsored by Kik Cola and was part of a three-team women's league. She wanted to attend university, but her family could not afford it. After beginning her career in Montreal with the Canadian division of engineering firm Kellogg, she was transferred to Toronto in 1942, where she helped set up the local office. She left the business world in 1967 to devote her life to a career in politics.

== Early political career ==
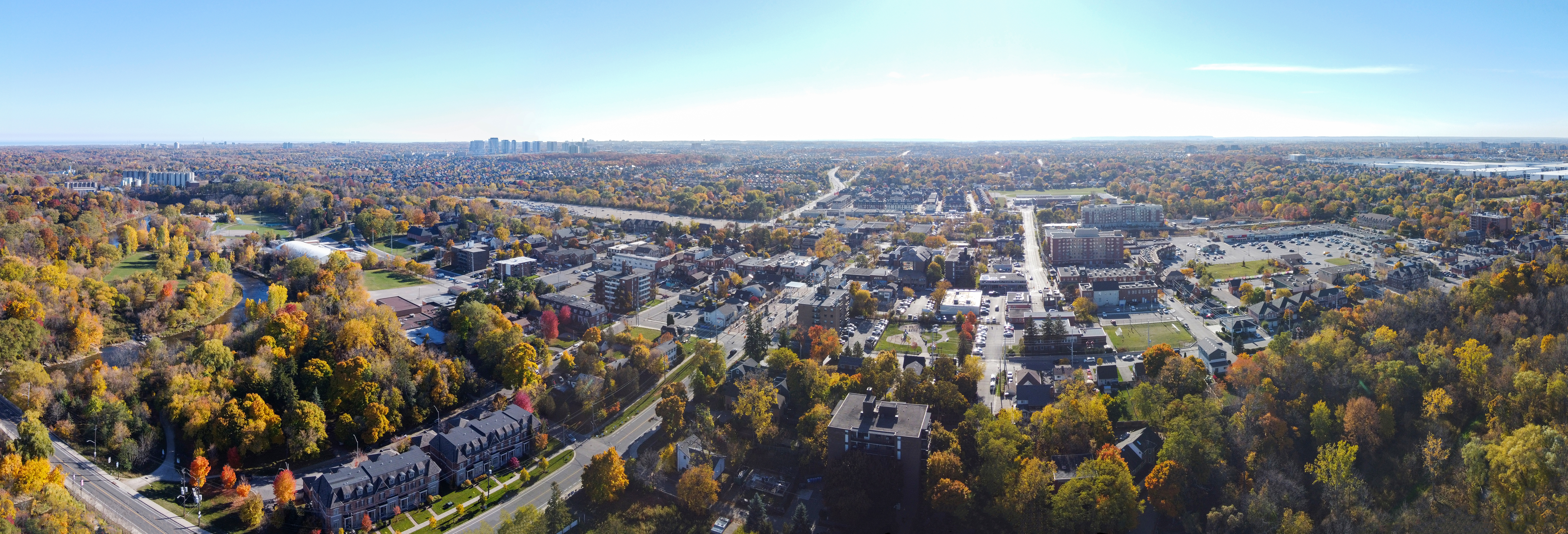
Aerial view of Streetsville

McCallion began her political career in Streetsville (now part of Mississauga). Her first campaign was in 1964 for the position of deputy reeve. It was unsuccessful, and she later considered herself to be a victim of "dirty tricks". Having later been appointed the chairman of the Streetsville Planning Board, she was elected as deputy reeve in the 1967 election and was appointed reeve in 1968. She was elected as Streetsville's mayor in 1970, serving until 1973.

The Town of Streetsville was amalgamated with the Town of Mississauga and the Town of Port Credit to form the City of Mississauga at the beginning of 1974; McCallion advocated unsuccessfully to preserve Streetsville as a separate municipality. In the same year she was elected to the Mississauga City Council, and retained her seat on the council by acclamation in the 1976 municipal election. By the time she was elected mayor of Mississauga, she had sat on virtually every committee in Peel Region and the City of Mississauga. She had also served on the executive of many federal and provincial committees and associations.

== Mayor of Mississauga ==
McCallion was first elected mayor in 1978, defeating popular incumbent Ron Searle by about 3,000 votes. She had been in office only a few months when the 1979 Mississauga train derailment occurred, in which a Canadian Pacific train carrying toxic chemicals derailed in a heavily populated area near Mavis Road. A large explosion and fire ensued as hazardous chemicals spilled. McCallion, along with the Peel Regional Police and other governmental authorities, oversaw the evacuation of the city. There were no deaths or serious injuries during the week-long emergency, and Mississauga gained renown for the successful evacuation of its then 200,000 residents.

During McCallion's terms in office, Mississauga grew from a small collection of towns and villages to one of Canada's largest cities, with much of the growth occurring after the 1976 election of René Lévesque's Parti Québécois government sparked an exodus of Anglophones and corporations from Montreal to the Greater Toronto Area (GTA). The high rate of low-density growth led to McCallion being nicknamed "Queen of Sprawl" by urban planning critics.

McCallion was easily re-elected throughout her tenure as mayor, with no serious challengers coming close to unseating her. She received more than 90% of the votes at the 1997, 2000 and 2003 mayoral elections. She never campaigned during elections and refused to accept political donations, instead asking her supporters to donate the money to charity. Her final term as mayor, won in the election of October 2010, was her twelfth consecutive term. She announced during her final term that she would not be running for re-election in the 2014 municipal elections and endorsed councillor and former federal member of Parliament Bonnie Crombie to replace her as Mayor. Crombie defeated former city councillor, member of Provincial Parliament and federal cabinet minister Steve Mahoney to win the 2014 municipal election.

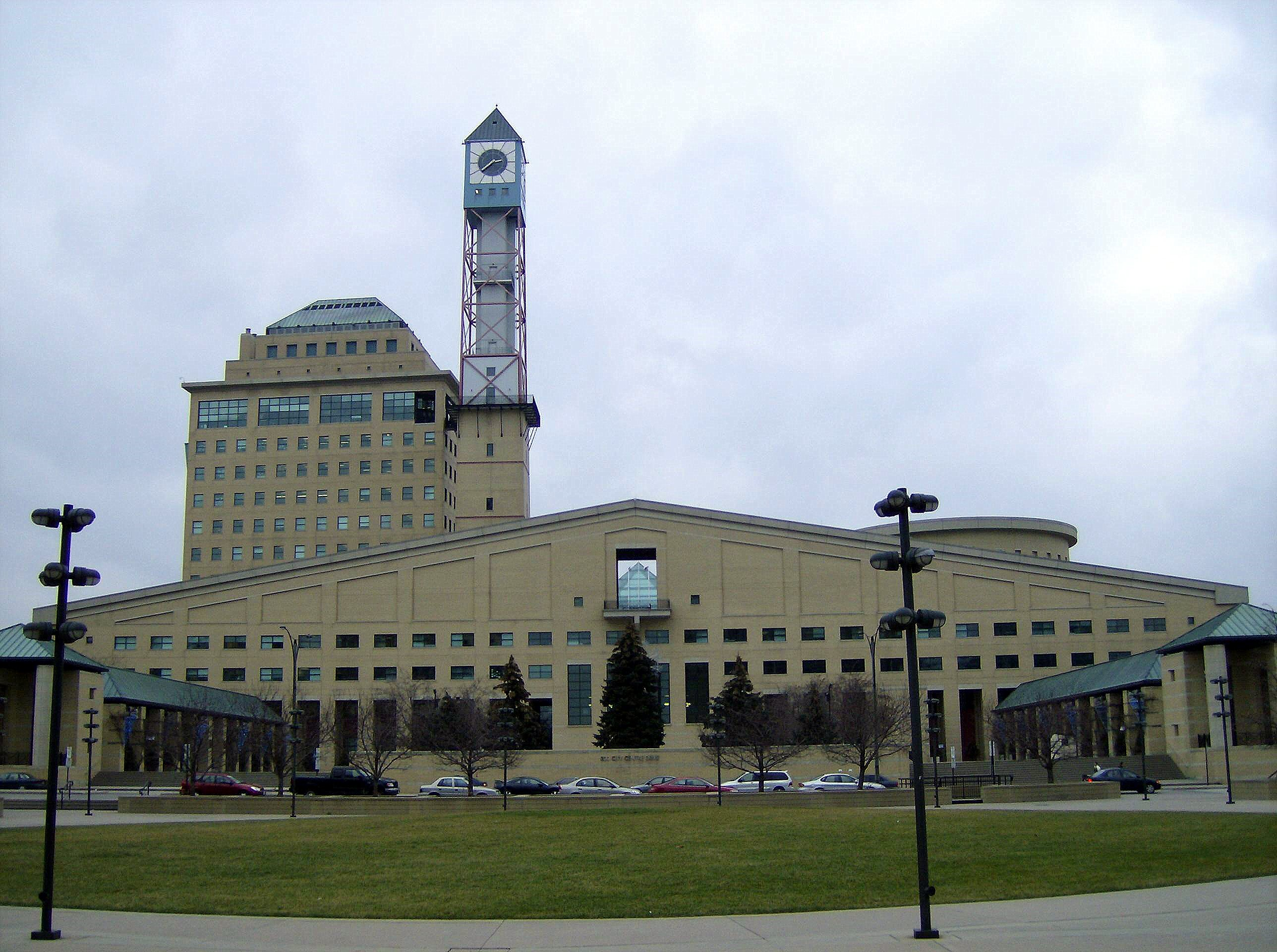
Mississauga City Hall

In 2012, McCallion was the third-highest paid mayor in Canada, with a salary of $187,057.

In a first-person account for Canadian magazine Confidence Bound, McCallion credited her faith with giving her energy, and said she still did her own household chores. "Housework and gardening are great forms of exercise and keep one humble."

On her 90th birthday in 2011, McCallion was assessed by Dr. Barbara Clive, a geriatrician, who stated that "at 90 her gait is perfect, her speech is totally sharp and she has the drive to still run this city. She's the poster child for seniors".

=== Conflict of interest allegations ===
In 1982, McCallion was found guilty of a conflict of interest on a planning decision by the Ontario High Court of Justice due to not absenting herself from a council meeting on a matter in which she had an interest. In 1983, The Municipal Conflict of Interest Act would have required her to vacate her seat and prohibited her from running for the following term.

In 2009, McCallion was the focus of public opinion when it was alleged that she failed to disclose a conflict of interest when attending meetings that concerned her son's company, World Class Developments Ltd. On October 3, 2011, Judge Douglas Cunningham found McCallion "acted in a 'real and apparent conflict of interest' while pushing hard for a real estate deal that could have put millions of dollars in her son's pocket." On June 14, 2013, charges under the Municipal Conflict of Interest Act were dismissed as World Class Developments did not have a financial interest as defined under the Act, and the application was also statute-barred. In a later ruling concerning costs, Judge J. Sproat said, "Out of seven major issues, Mayor McCallion was successful on only three. On two of the three issues Mayor McCallion was successful, not because of any prudence or diligence, but only because World Class Developments's project had not progressed at a faster pace."

=== Political views ===
While party preferences are not usually expressed in Canadian municipal politics, McCallion supported the Liberal Party at the federal and provincial levels, and was asked in 1982 to consider running for the leadership of the Ontario Liberal Party. She endorsed Kathleen Wynne on the convention floor of the 2013 Ontario Liberal Party leadership election, and later endorsed her and her party in the 2014 Ontario general election. Otherwise, McCallion was sometimes described as a small-c conservative. McCallion endorsed Liberal leader Justin Trudeau for the 2015 election. She also appeared in a notable television advertisement for the federal Liberals during the final days of the 2015 election. In the 2018 Ontario provincial election, McCallion endorsed PC leader Doug Ford, who went on to become Premier of Ontario.

In 2007, McCallion responded to the federal government's refusal to give any of the Canadian goods and services tax to cities, a funding source long requested by many municipalities across Canada, by planning a five percent surcharge on property taxes in the city. She was able to have the levy introduced and approved on the same day by Mississauga City council. Most media coverage, as well as Toronto mayor David Miller, noted that McCallion was arguably one of the few mayors in the country with the political capital to implement such a strategy.

McCallion was one of the first Canadian politicians to openly support the creation of a Palestinian state. Addressing the annual convention of the Canadian Arab Federation in 1983, she argued that Palestinian issues had been distorted by the national media and was quoted as saying, "The Palestinians need and require and deserve a country of their own. Why shouldn't they get it?"

=== Achievements ===
McCallion established the GTA Mayors' Committee in 1992. She brought together the 30 mayors, later adding the chair of Metropolitan Toronto and the four regional chairs to work cooperatively for the economic promotion of the GTA. From 1992 to January 2000, the committee, chaired by McCallion, was a strong voice on key issues affecting the future of the GTA. She was a founder and honorary co-chair of the Greater Toronto Marketing Alliance.

In 1996, McCallion was appointed to the "Who Does What" panel. She was also appointed to two sub-panels: Assessment and Property Taxation Reform, and Emergency Services. She represented the Association of Municipalities of Ontario on the Electricity Transition Committee for the Ministry of Electricity, Science and Technology.

McCallion is the first woman to hold such significant positions as president of the Streetsville and District Chamber of Commerce, president of the Anglican Young Peoples' Association of Canada, mayor of Streetsville, and mayor of Mississauga. She was responsible for the formation of Hazel's Hope, a campaign to fund health care for children afflicted with AIDS and HIV in southern Africa.

McCallion hosted an annual gala in Mississauga to raise money for arts and culture in the city.

=== Ice hockey ===
At the 1987 World Women's Hockey Tournament, the championship trophy was named the Hazel McCallion World Cup. McCallion was once a board member of the Central Ontario Women's Hockey League, and was instrumental in the construction of the Hershey Centre in Mississauga. She provided assistance to Don Cherry's group to bring an Ontario Hockey League franchise to the city in 1998, and she was instrumental in bringing the IIHF Women's World Hockey Championships to the city in 2000.

== Post-political career ==
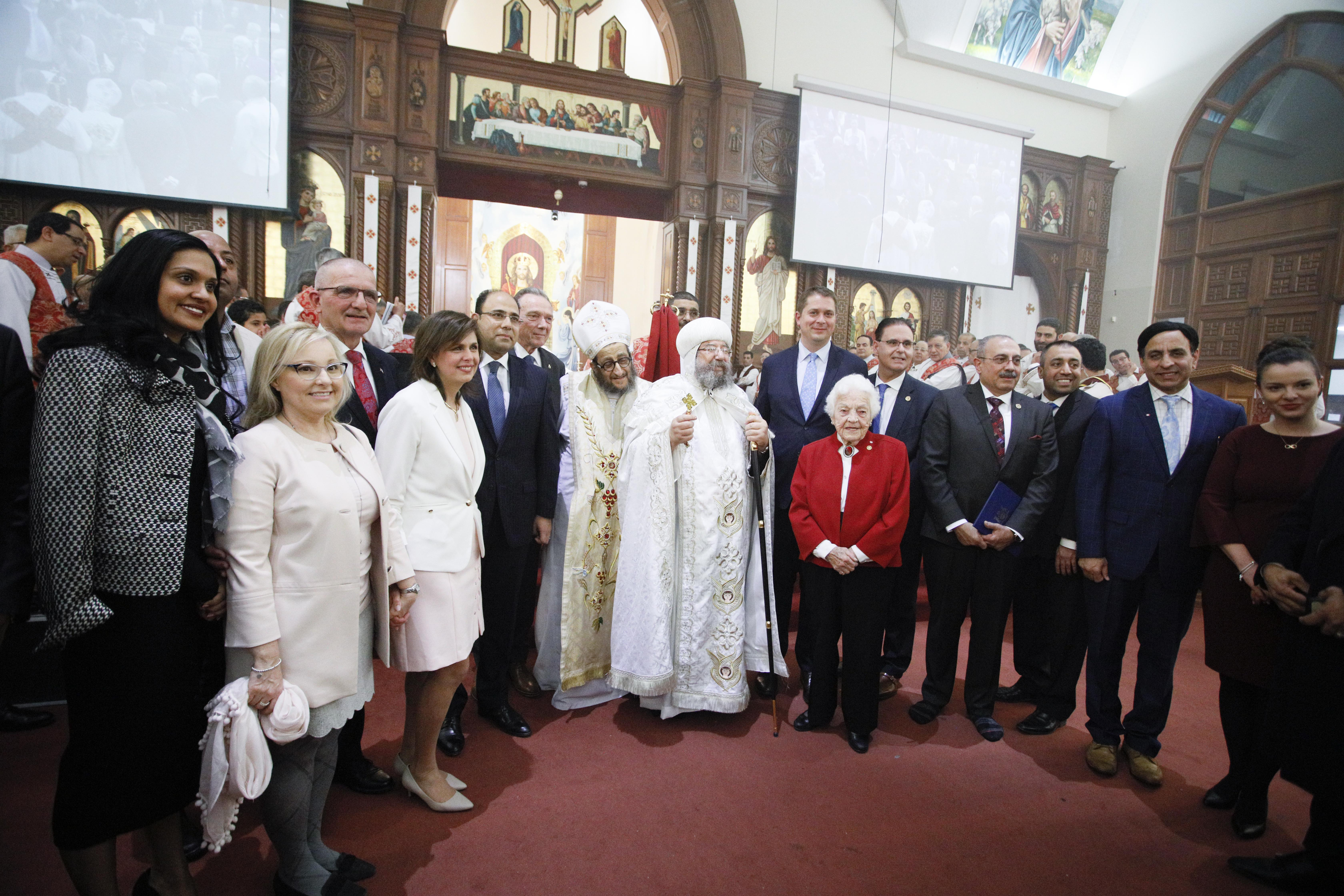
McCallion at the Church of the Virgin Mary and Saint Athanasius in Mississauga in 2019.

In November 2015, McCallion was appointed chief elder officer (CEO) of Revera Inc., to provide advice and counsel to the senior living sector company.

In September 2011, Sheridan College opened the doors to its Hazel McCallion Campus in Mississauga, which was greatly expanded in 2018, more than doubling its enrollment. Furthering her ties with the college, in 2016, McCallion was named Sheridan's first chancellor, as part of its bid to attain university status. In February 2015, McCallion became a special advisor to the University of Toronto Mississauga (UTM), the Mississauga campus of the University of Toronto, providing advice on matters related to strategic development of the school.

In 2017 McCallion was appointed to the board of the Greater Toronto Airport Authority, a position for which she accepted a three-year renewal in April 2022. In January 2019, Ontario Premier Doug Ford appointed McCallion as a special adviser. She soon after said she wanted more details before accepting or declining, but later decided to decline the job offer. In October 2022, McCallion was appointed the head of the Greenbelt Council advisory group by Premier Ford. In January 2023, she endorsed his plan to take protected areas out of the Greenbelt for housing development, calling it "brave".

== Personal life ==
Journeaux met her future husband, Sam McCallion (1923–1997), at an Anglican Church congregation in Toronto in 1951; they married on September 29 of that year. As a marriage present from McCallion's in-laws, a piece of land near the village of Streetsville was given to the newlyweds, to which they moved in December 1951. The couple had three children, and were married until Sam McCallion's death from Alzheimer's disease in 1997. Their son Peter unsuccessfully ran for Mississauga Ward 9 councillor in the 2022 municipal election.

As a volunteer, McCallion served as president of the Anglican Young People's Association of Canada, and was a district commissioner with the Girl Guides of Canada in the early 1960s. Before politics, she and her husband founded The Streetsville Booster in 1964. (Note: since merged with the Mississauga News, part of the Metroland group of community newspapers.)

=== Death and state funeral ===
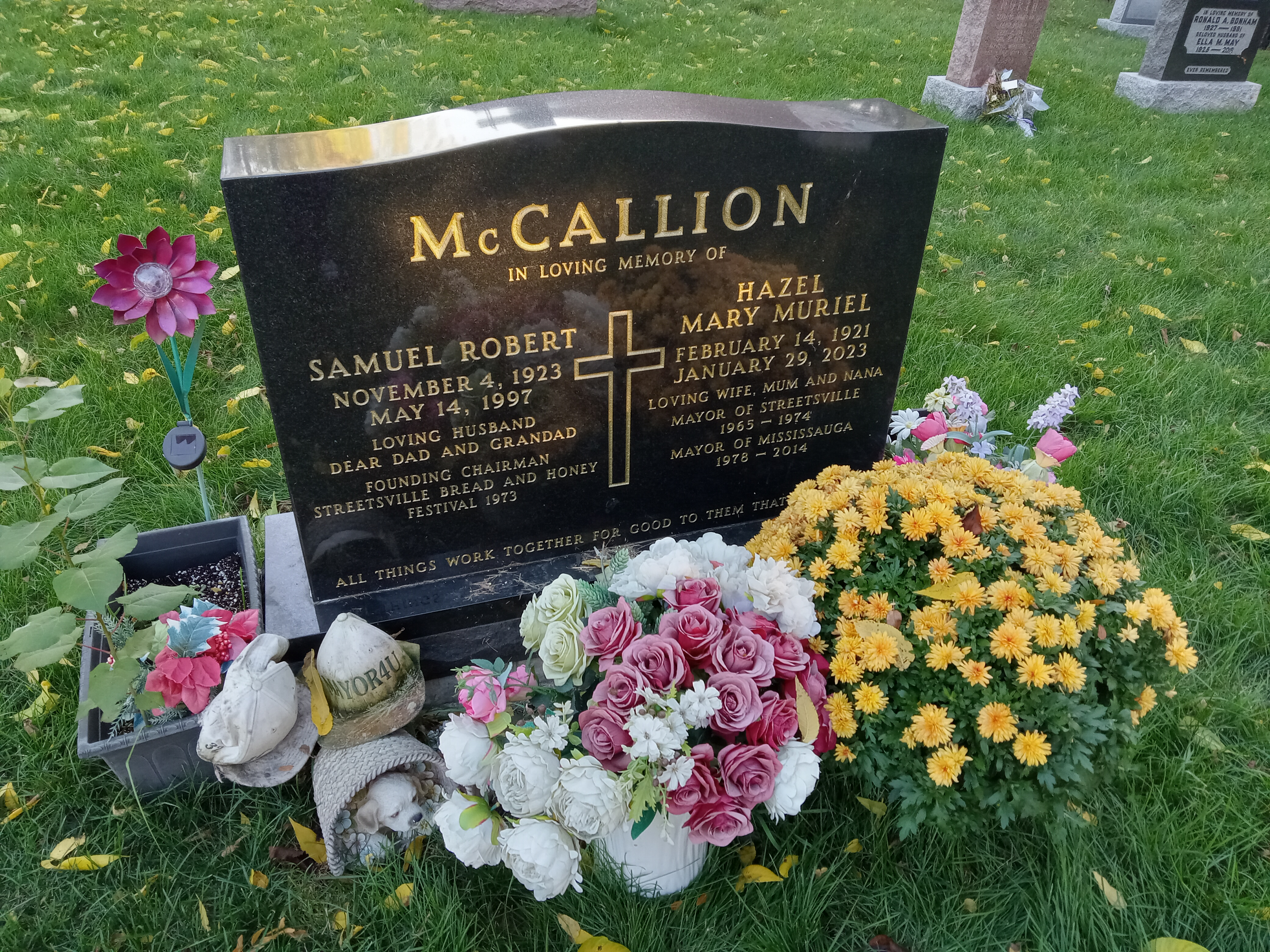
McCallion's grave marker

McCallion died from pancreatic cancer at home on January 29, 2023, at age 101. A state funeral was held for McCallion on February 14, 2023, on what would have been her 102nd birthday. Her body lay in repose at Mississauga Civic Centre for two days, prior to her funeral at the Paramount Fine Foods Centre. Dignitaries attending the funeral included prime minister Justin Trudeau, former prime minister Jean Chrétien, and Ontario premier Doug Ford. Flags in Ontario were flown at half-mast on the day of her funeral.

== Recognition ==
In 2016, February 14 was renamed Hazel McCallion Day across Ontario in honour of her birthday.

=== Honours ===
The following have been conferred on McCallion:

- 1999: Cross of the Order of Merit of the Federal Republic of Germany for her role in bringing German companies to Canada.
- 2002: Canadian version of the Queen Elizabeth II Golden Jubilee Medal.
- 2003: Leadership in Public Service Award from the International Economic Development Council.
- 2005: Runner-up for the World Mayor Award, behind Dora Bakoyannis of Athens.
- 2005: Member of the Order of Canada (CM).
- 2007: President's Award from Professional Engineers Ontario.
- 2010: Honorary Doctor of Law degree from the University of Toronto.
- 2012: Shahid Rassam unveiled a portrait of McCallion in support of the SickKids Foundation.
- 2012: Canadian version of the Queen Elizabeth II Diamond Jubilee Medal.
- 2014: Order of the Rising Sun, 4th Class, Gold Rays with Rosette, for her support of Japanese businesses in Mississauga and furthering of Canada–Japan relations.
- 2017: Key to the City of Mississauga.
- 2019: Honorary Doctor of Law degree from Ryerson University.
- 2021: Announced as a 2020 appointee to the Order of Ontario (OOnt).

=== Eponyms ===
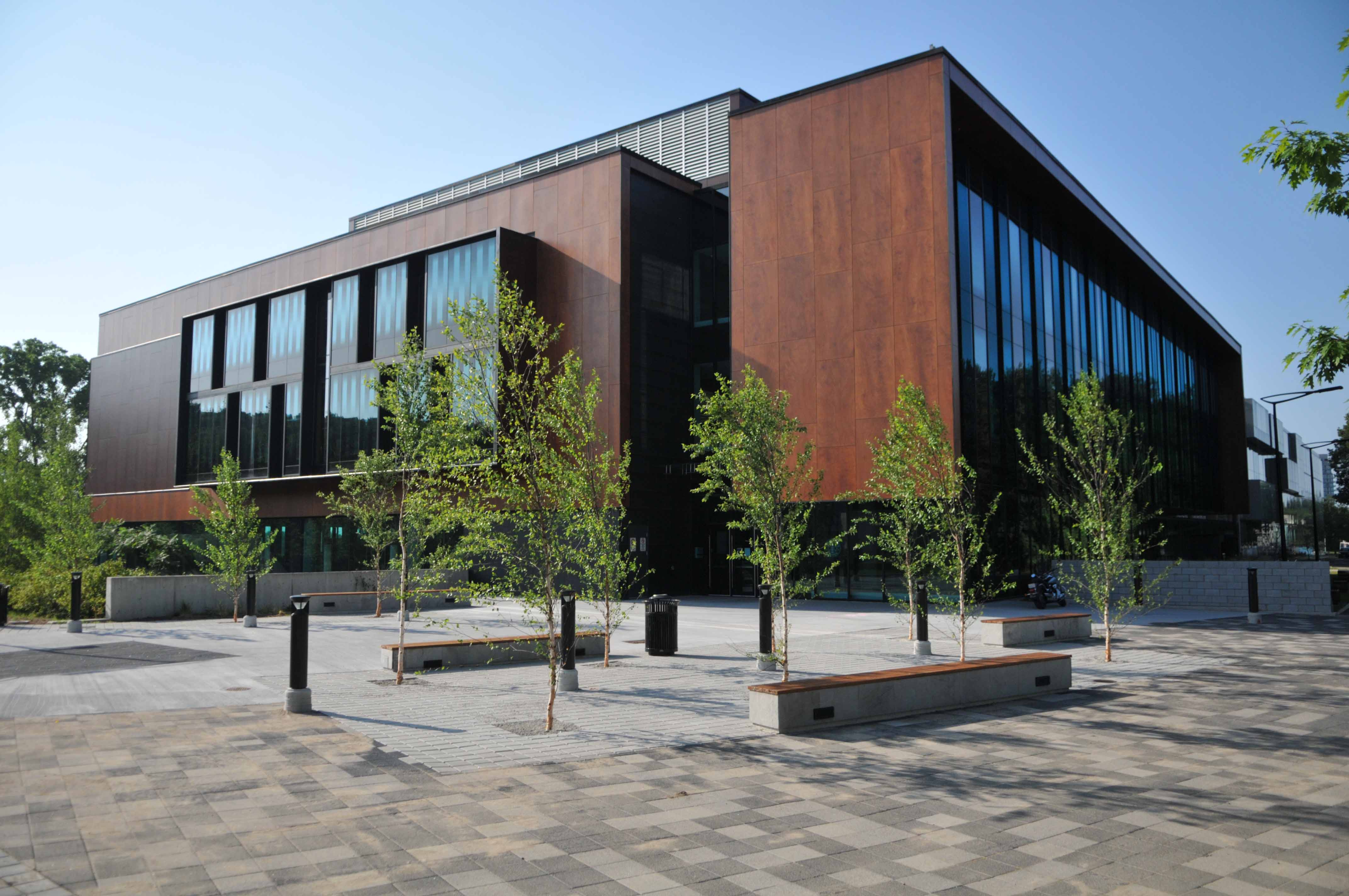
The Hazel McCallion Academic Learning Centre, which houses the University of Toronto Mississauga Library

The following have been named in her honour:

- Hazel McCallion Senior Public School
- Hazel McCallion Academic Learning Centre, University of Toronto Mississauga
- Hazel McCallion Centre for Heart Health, Mississauga Hospital
- Hazel McCallion Campus, Sheridan College
- Hazel McCallion Canada Day Parade, Port Credit
- Mississauga McCallion Women's Softball League, established in 1980
- Hazel McCallion Central Library of the Mississauga Library System, renamed after her ahead of her 100th birthday in 2021
- Hazel McCallion Arts, Culture and Heritage Fund, The Community Foundation of Mississauga
- Hazel McCallion Hall, Vic Johnston Community Centre
- Hazel McCallion Line, formerly known as the Hurontario LRT, is a light-rail transit project spanning from Mississauga to Brampton.
- Alectra Utilities Hazel McCallion Municipal Substation, in Streetsville, named in 2008 by predecessor Enersource
- Hazel McCallion Walk for Health, run by Trillium Health Partners, created in 2022

== Sources ==
- Urbaniak, Tom (2009). Her Worship: Hazel McCallion and the Development of Mississauga. Toronto, Ontario: University of Toronto Press. ISBN 978-0-8020-9902-0.

Political offices
Preceded by Ron Searle	Mayor of Mississauga; 1978–2014	Succeeded by Bonnie Crombie
New title	Ward 9 Councillor, Mississauga; 1974–1977	Succeeded by Ken Dear
Preceded by Jack Graham	Mayor of Streetsville; 1970–1973	Amalgamation with Mississauga
Preceded by D.E. Hewson	Reeve of Streetsville; 1968–1969	Succeeded by Wm. Appleton
Preceded by G. Parker	Deputy Reeve of Streetsville; 1968	Succeeded by Wm. C. Arch
