= The Michener Institute =

Health education institute in Toronto

The Michener Institute of Education at UHN
- Former names: Toronto Institute of Medical Technology (1958–1990); The Michener Institute for Applied Health Sciences (1990–2016)
- Motto: Per scientiam ad salutem (Latin)
- Motto in English: "Through science to health"
- Type: Publicly funded institute for applied health sciences
- Established: 1958; 68 years ago
- Parent institution: University Health Network
- Affiliations: CBIE, CCAA, ACCC, AUCC
- Location: Toronto, Ontario, Canada; 43°39′21″N 79°23′28″W
- Campus: Urban
- Colours: Blue and gold
- Website: michener.ca

The Michener Institute of Education at University Health Network, or simply Michener, is a specialist post-secondary institution in Toronto, Ontario, Canada. Michener was founded by Diana Michener Schatz as the Toronto Institute of Medical Technology in 1958 with a pilot program in medical laboratory technology at the Toronto General Hospital. After years of expanding its programs in applied health sciences, the institute was relocated to its present campus in 1972 at 222 St. Patrick Street and was renamed "The Michener Institute" after Schatz's father, Roland Michener (former Governor General of Canada), in 1990. The institute is funded by the Ontario Ministry of Health and governed by the University Health Network (UHN), Canada's largest publicly-funded health care organization.

The Michener Institute consists of a School of Applied Health Sciences and a School of Continuing Education. Within its School of Applied Health Sciences, it offers certification in various medical technologies, including chiropody, cardiovascular perfusion, diagnostic cytology, medical laboratory science, respiratory therapy, ultrasound, radiation therapy, and genetics technology. Michener also offers a number of joint programs with the University of Toronto. As of 2024, there are 1,200 full-time and 4,200 part-time students enrolled at the school.

== History ==
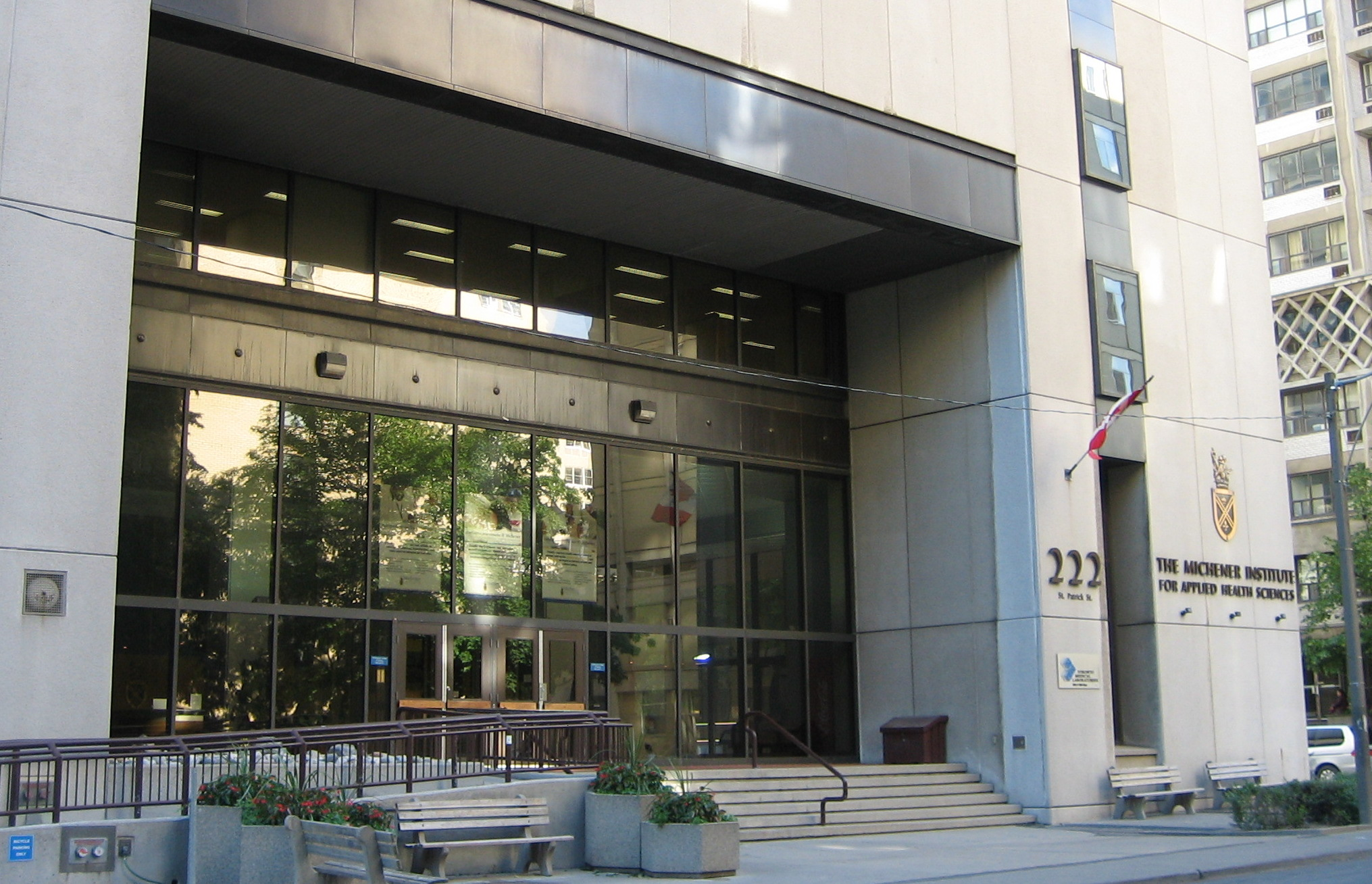
The Michener Institute from St. Patrick Street.

The Michener Institute was founded by Diana Michener Schatz under the name the Toronto Institute of Medical Technology. In 1958, the value of combining learning in an educational and clinical environment was demonstrated by the introduction of a pilot program developed by hospital physicians and medical technologists. In 1990, the school's name was changed to The Michener Institute for Applied Health Sciences in honour of Schatz's father, Roland Michener, the 20th Canadian Governor General.

In 2008, The Michener Institute celebrated 50 years in applied health science education. Michener officially integrated with the University Health Network (UHN) in 2016 to become The Michener Institute of Education at UHN, a partnership that embeds the school within the larger hospital network. The aims of the merger are to create better learning opportunities for working health care professionals, deliver more up-to-date and comprehensive education for students, and accelerate the transfer of academic research from the school labs into clinical practice. The integration was inspired by the Mayo Clinic in Rochester, Minnesota, and is the first time such a partnership between a school and a hospital has existed in Canada.

== Programs ==
Within its School of Applied Health Sciences, the Michener Institute offers 12 full-time programs, two part-time programs and several continuing education programs. Each program consists of a combination of didactic and clinical semesters. Some of Michener's full-time programs include: Chiropody, Genetics Technology, Medical Laboratory Sciences, Nuclear Medicine and Respiratory Therapy. The part-time programs are in Anesthesia Assistant and Magnetic Resonance Imaging (MRI). The Michener Institute offers bachelor's degrees available through joint programs with the University of Toronto (Medical Radiation Sciences). In the past, Michener Institute also offered a joint program in Radiation Therapy with Laurentian University. This program was discontinued on April 12, 2021, as a result of Laurentian University's effort to restructure program offerings.

Additionally, the institute offers a vast number of workshops, courses, and certificate programs within its School of Continuing Education.

On December 2, 2020, Michener Institute announced that a new full-time program was being developed "to meet the health system's need for digitally-literate health professionals." The new program titled Digital Health and Data Analytics will begin in September 2021 with enrolment opening in Spring 2021.

== Arms ==
Coat of arms of The Michener Institute

Notes
Granted 30 January 1995
Crest
Rising out of a circlet of trillium flowers Argent seeded Or leaved Vert a demi lion Azure armed and langued Or semé of billets also Or bearing in its forepaws a rod of Aescalapius Or.
Escutcheon
Azure four bendlets interlaced in saltire between in chief a representation of the Royal Crown and in base a fleur de lis Or all within a bordure Or charged with three closed books Azure clasped Or.
Supporters
On a grassy mound Vert dexter a stag Or attired and unguled Azure gorged with a cord also Azure pendant therefrom a hurt charged with a flask Or sinister a doe Or unguled Azure gorged with a like collar.
Motto
Per Scientiam Ad Salutem (Through Science To Health)

== Notable people ==
=== Faculty ===
- Mary Preece, academic administrator
