= Mary Preece =

Canadian academic administrator

7th President of Sheridan College
- In office November 1, 2016 – June 10, 2018
- Chancellor: Hazel McCallion
- Preceded by: Jeff Zabudsky
- Succeeded by: Janet Morrison

Mary Preece is a Canadian academic administrator who served as president and vice chancellor of Sheridan College from 2016 to 2018. Prior to this role, she held positions as provost and vice president academic at both Sheridan College and the Michener Institute for Applied Health Sciences.

== Career ==
Preece began her career in academia as an educator at Centennial College, where she taught in the School of Business for 15 years. She later took on leadership roles, advancing to chair, director, and eventually dean of academic studies. In 2002, she moved to the Michener Institute for Applied Health Sciences, where she served as provost and vice president academic until 2008.

In 2008, Preece joined Sheridan College as provost and vice president academic. In this role, she contributed to the development of the college's vision of becoming an undergraduate teaching university with a focus on applied professional education. Her responsibilities included overseeing academic programs, scholarship, and research, and aligning these aspects with Sheridan's institutional goals.

On November 1, 2016, Preece was appointed president and vice chancellor of Sheridan College, following the resignation of Jeff Zabudsky. Initially intended to be a temporary position, her term was extended to ensure stability during the college's leadership transition. During her presidency, Preece maintained Sheridan's direction toward becoming a polytechnic institution and supported efforts for the college to be recognized as a university by Universities Canada. She noted the challenges of achieving this status due to legislative distinctions between colleges and universities in Ontario.

Preece's tenure included several initiatives at Sheridan. In 2017, she facilitated the relocation of trade programs from the Oakville campus to the Davis campus in Brampton. That same year, she also supported the creation of an innovation center at the Hazel McCallion campus in collaboration with the city of Mississauga and Ryerson University. Additionally, she oversaw Sheridan's involvement in a proposed university expansion project in Brampton, which focused on STEAM (science, technology, engineering, arts, and math) undergraduate programs. She was succeeded by Janet Morrison on June 11, 2018.
