= Streetsville, Mississauga =

Streetsville
- Neighbourhood
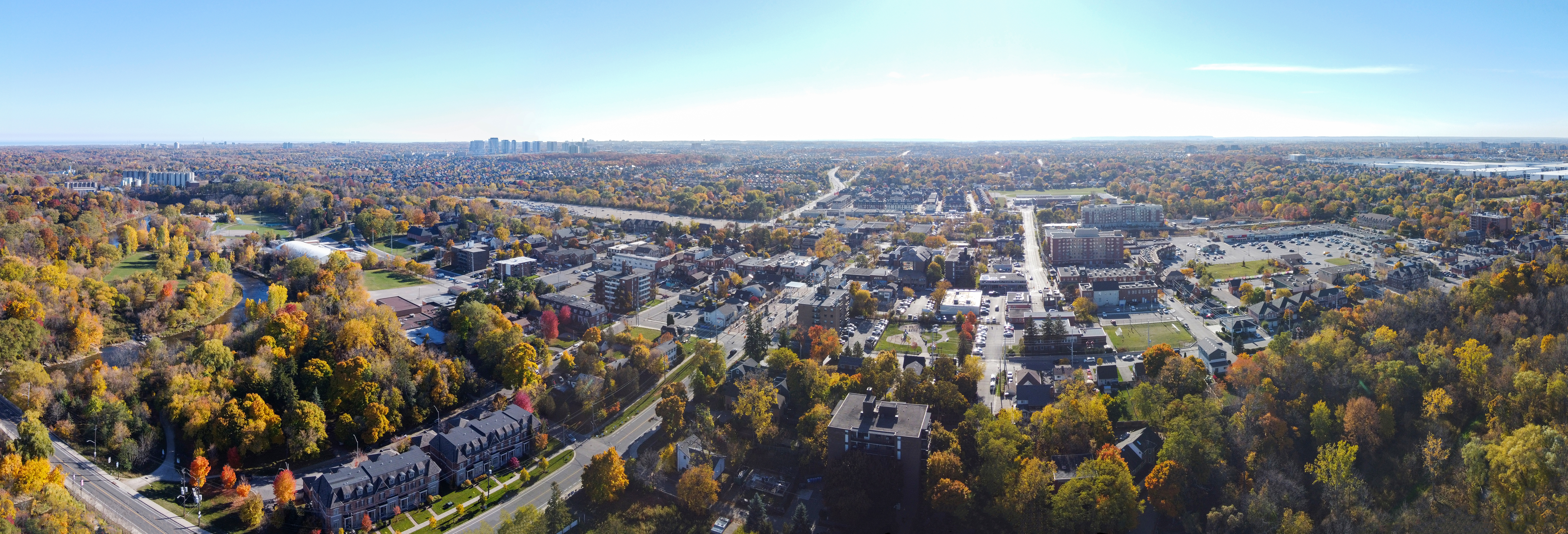
- Aerial view of Streetsville
- Nickname: The Village in the City
- Interactive map of Streetsville
- Coordinates: 43°35′12″N 79°43′17″W
- Country: Canada
- Province: Ontario
- Regional municipality: Peel
- City: Mississauga
- Settled: 1819
- Established: 1858 (Village); 1962 (Town)
- Changed Division: 1974 Peel Region from Peel County
- Amalgamated: 1974 into Mississauga

Government
  - MP: Rechie Valdez
  - MPP: Nina Tangri
  - Councillors: George Carlson (Ward 11)

Population (2016)
  - Total: 118,301
  - Density: 2,547.8/km^{2} (6,599/sq mi)
- Postal code: L5M
- Website: https://villageofstreetsville.com/

Streetsville (pop. 47,327) is a neighbourhood located in the northwestern corner of the city of Mississauga, Ontario, Canada, on the Credit River. Although Streetsville occupies the west and east banks of the river, the historic village area is located on its west bank.

A town prior to the 1974 amalgamations that formed the City of Mississauga, it seeks to keep a "small town" charm by retaining a variety of historical buildings and streetscapes. As part of this attempt to maintain a separate identity from the larger city, the names of two main Mississauga streets, as they pass through Streetsville, retain the names they had when Streetsville was an independent village: Mississauga Road and Bristol Road, which remain as Queen Street and Main Street respectively. Other main thoroughfares that pass through or near Streetsville include Britannia Road, Creditview Road, Eglinton Avenue, and Erin Mills Parkway.

== History ==
=== Before 1800 ===
The area surrounding the Credit River was populated by the Iroquois people up until the early 18th century, when it was taken by the Ojibwa. European settlers came to know them specifically as the Mississaugas, which eventually became the name of the area itself. By 1805, the Natives had either ceded or sold most of this land over to British governance.

=== Settlement ===
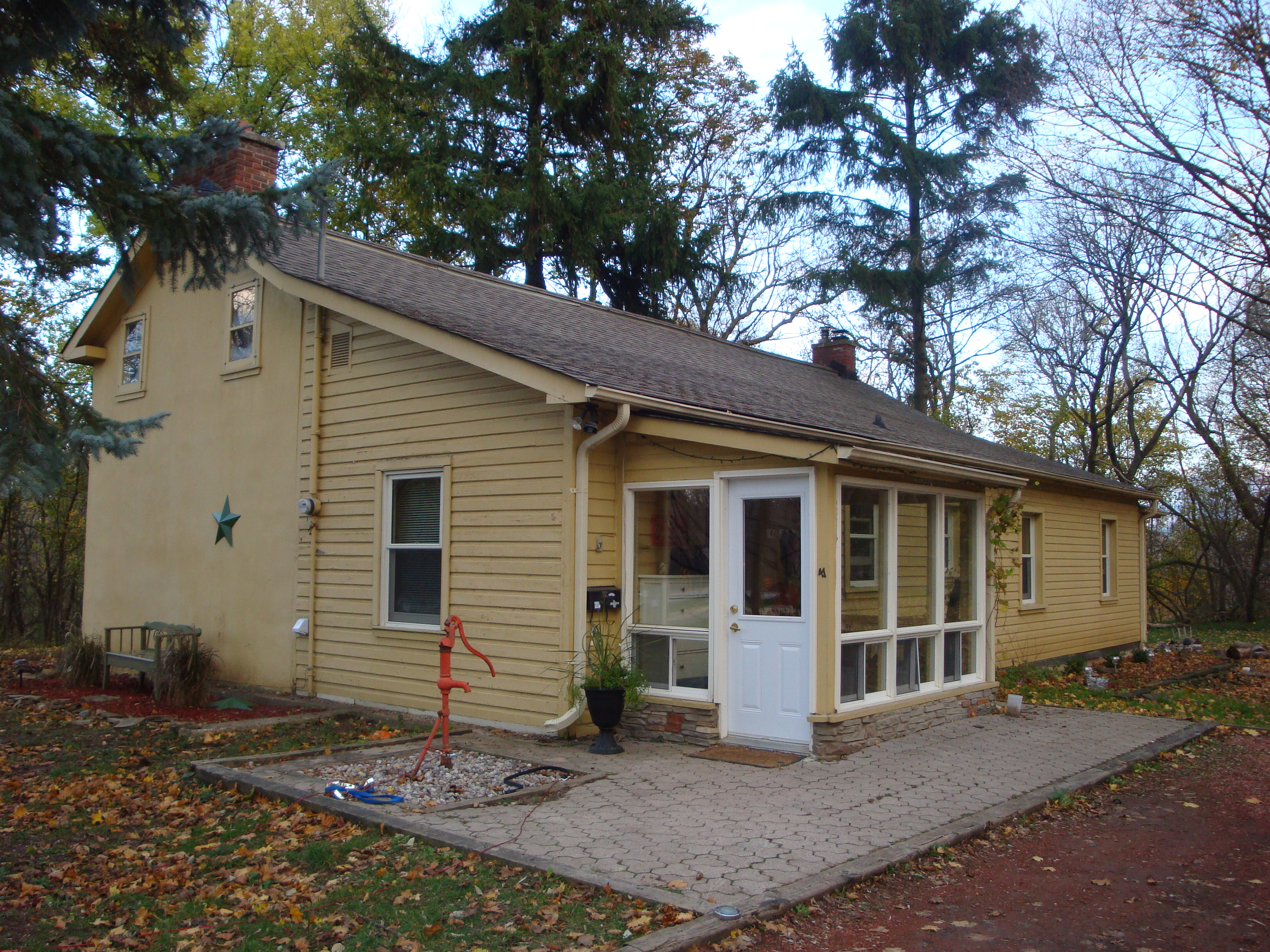
The Timothy Street Home was built by the founder of Streetsville in 1825.

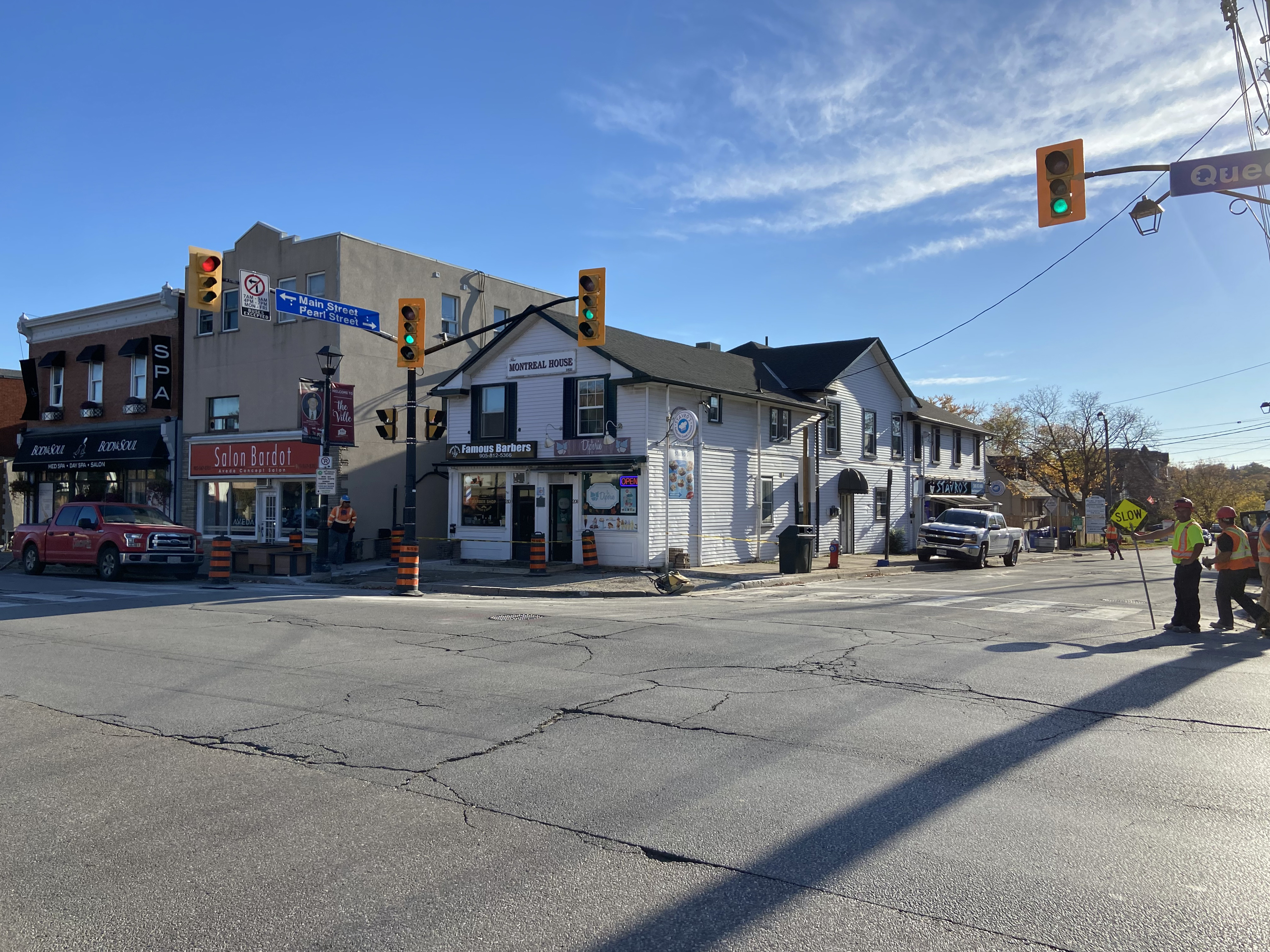
Montreal House, the first general store in Streetsville, was founded in 1821

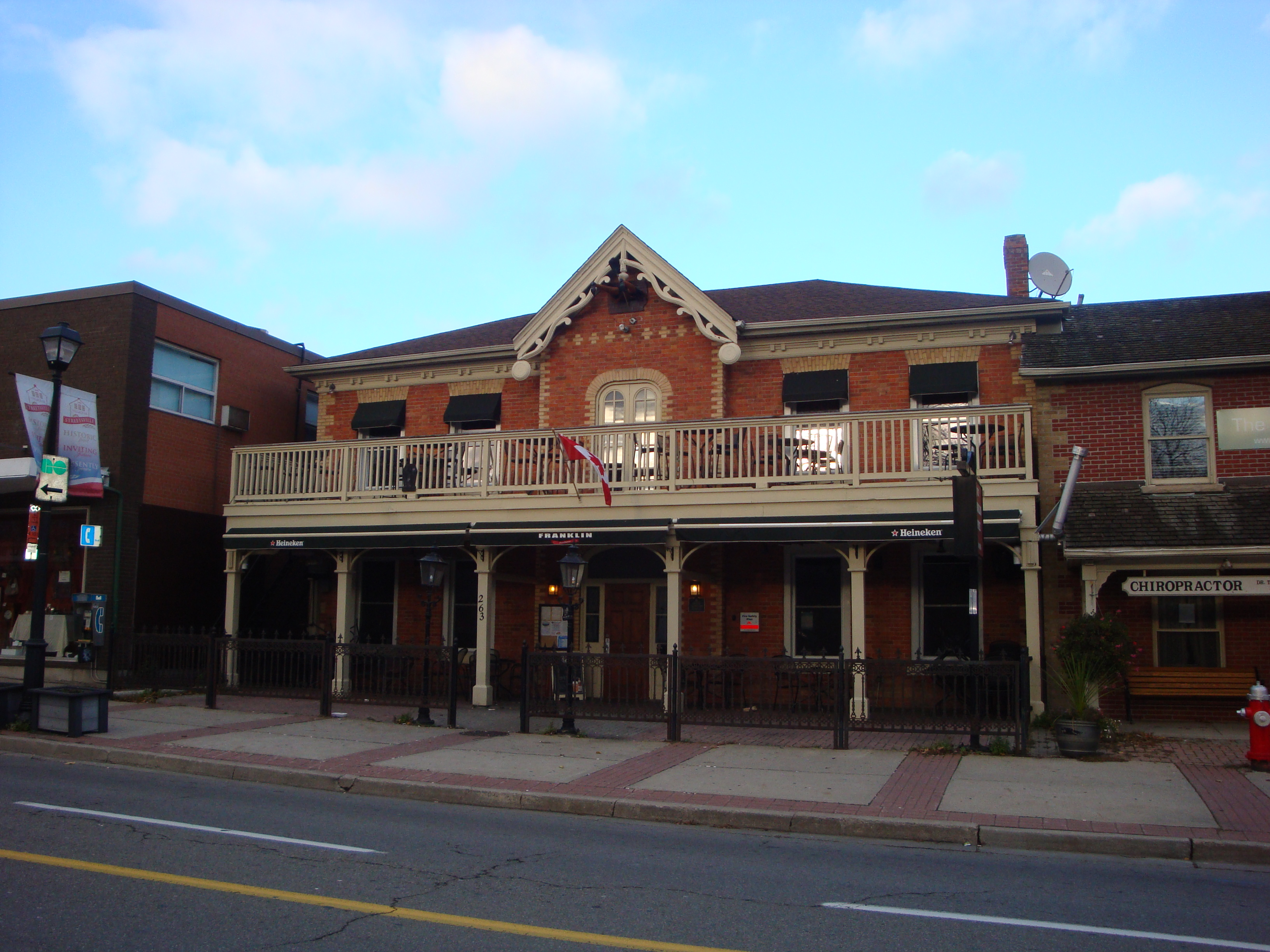
Franklin House, built in the 1850s

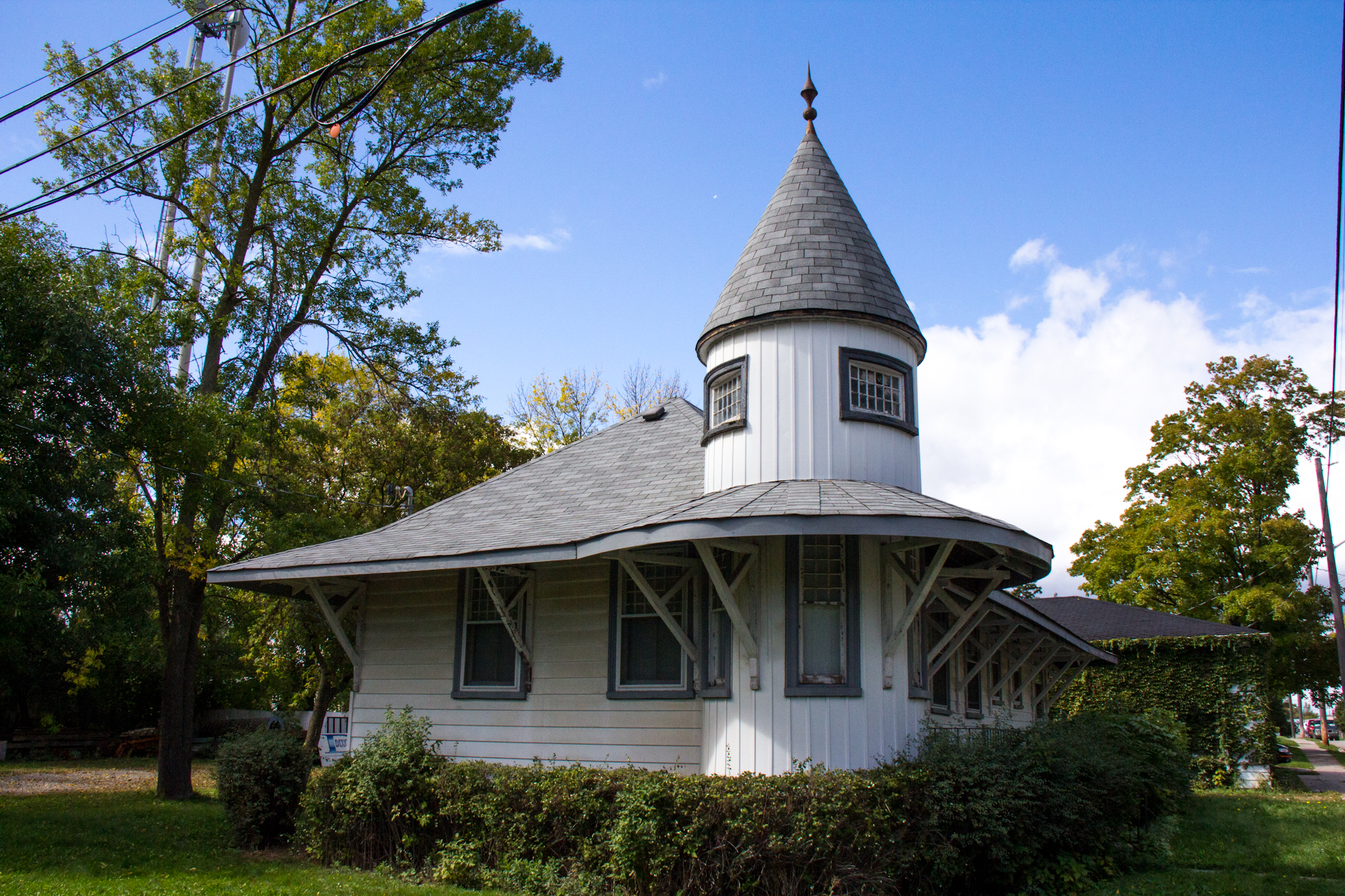
Credit Valley Railway station. A new station was built in 1914, and the original building was moved to a different location in Streetsville.

The beginnings of Streetsville are interwoven with the history of its founder, Timothy Street. Street was born in 1778 in the American colonies to a British Loyalist family. At the age of 23, he moved with his family from New York to St. David's, a settlement on the Niagara River in Upper Canada (as Ontario was then known).

In 1818, the British made a second purchase of 648,000 acres (2,620 km^{2}) of land from the indigenous Mississauga peoples. Before it could be opened for settlement, the land had to be surveyed, and as was usual for the time, surveyors would receive a grant of land from the parcel that they surveyed as compensation for their work. Timothy Street, along with Richard Bristol (for whom Bristol Road is named), a qualified surveyor, applied for a contract to survey parts of the newly available land. As they did their work, Street quickly began to appreciate the immense potential for settlement along the Credit River, and made plans to erect both a saw and grist mill once his work was finished.

In April 1819, the surveyed land was opened for settlement, and the first settler in the area, James Glendinning, settled on a parcel of land along Mullet Creek. Timothy Street did build his saw and grist mills, using stones from Glendinning's land.

A large quarry of red clay lay on the west side of the village, encouraging the use of brick for construction.

In 1821, Streetsville's first general store, now known as Montreal House, was built, and still stands. Another landmark, Timothy Street's house, was built in 1825 and is one of the oldest brick houses in Peel Region.

In 1855, William Graydon and Peter Douglass built a large brick building, and sold it in 1859 to Bennet Franklin, a partner in Barber Brothers Toronto Woollen Mills. It became known as Franklin House. In 1910, under new ownership, the name was changed to the Queen's Hotel. Although it ceased to operate as a hotel when its public room was closed with the enforcement of the Canada Temperance Act, it continued to be used for commercial purposes. At present, it has been designated under the terms of the Ontario Heritage Act and protected by a heritage easement, and now houses a restaurant and a variety of small businesses and offices.

In 1858, Streetsville was incorporated as a village, with a population of 1500 people. The primary work was found in grist mills, sawmills and tanneries. Timothy Street's son, John, was the first reeve. For the next century, Streetsville largely existed as a long narrow village with all of its shops, three churches, the cenotaph and the library located on Queen Street, which ran between the Credit River and the railway track.

A century later, in 1951, the population of Streetsville had declined to 1,139 people. Then in 1953, two of the first suburbs in Canada, Vista Heights and Riverview, were built to the southwest and northeast respectively. Vista Heights was notable because the town council made the unprecedented decision to require the developer to build a K-6 (kindergarten to Grade 6) elementary school. These suburbs and Vista Heights Public School opened in 1955, presaging the future rapid growth of middle-class suburbs in the area. Another suburban area that grew as a de facto expansion of Streetsville (not as development reaching out to it from the main urban area of Mississauga) is River Grove, which is centred along Bristol Road east of the Credit River and extends to Creditview Road; although this area was developed in the late 1980's, well after Streetsville's amalgamation into Mississauga.

=== 1962 incorporation and 1974 municipal reorganization ===
As families moved into the new suburbs, the town's population grew rapidly. By January 1962, Streetsville's population reached 5,000, and it was incorporated as a town. The first mayor was Frank Dowling.

In 1968, the Town of Mississauga was created from Toronto Township absorbing the police village of Malton. Although Streetsville and Port Credit were excluded from this amalgamation, they were amalgamated in 1974 when Mississauga became a city.

== Politics ==
=== Municipal ===
Streetsville is a member of the Ward 11 within the city of Mississauga, which was created from Ward 6. Representing the ward is Councillor George Carlson, who was elected Councillor of the eleventh ward in 2000 and was re-elected in 2003, 2006, 2010 and 2014. Carlson is a direct descendant of one of Streetsville's founders, Henry Rutledge (1797–1875) who also served as a local Councillor. Prior to the annexing of Mississauga, Hazel McCallion was the mayor of Streetsville (1970–1973) and was the township's last reeve (1967–1970). She was the fifth mayor of Mississauga and lived in Streetsville until her death on January 29, 2023 from pancreatic cancer.

=== Provincial ===
Streetsville is located in the provincial riding of Mississauga—Streetsville The current MPP is Nina Tangri.

=== Federal ===
Streetsville resides in the federal riding of Mississauga—Streetsville. The riding was created in 2003 after Mississauga—Erindale and Mississauga South were divided. The present riding is represented by Liberal Member of Parliament Rechie Valdez, Minister of Small Business. (https://www.ourcommons.ca/members/en/rechie-valdez(110538))

== Demographics ==
As of 2009, Streetsville's population (whose census boundary includes surrounding areas such as East Credit and Erin Mills Central) stood at 47,327 with a 9.9% population increase between 2001 and 2006 and a subsequent 20% increase from 2006 to 2009. From 2006 to 2009, households also increased in number from 12,178 to 13,722. The majority of Streetsville residences own their own homes (85%) with more than 51,000 residents holding a university or college degree. Also the majority of residences work within grey or white collar jobs versus only 27% of the population consisting of labour workers . Furthermore, the average household income of Streetsville residents amounts to $124,255 with only a 5.6% unemployment rate. With homes averaging around 3.4 bedrooms, the average family consists of three people per home and has around 1.4 children. Streetsville's population has an average age of 38, with 33% of the population being between the ages of 25 and 44, 23.1% being between the ages of 45 and 64, and 14.5% being between the ages of 15 and 24. Also among the population, 61.4% of residents are married while 29.1% are single and 9.5% are widowed or divorced.

== Community ==
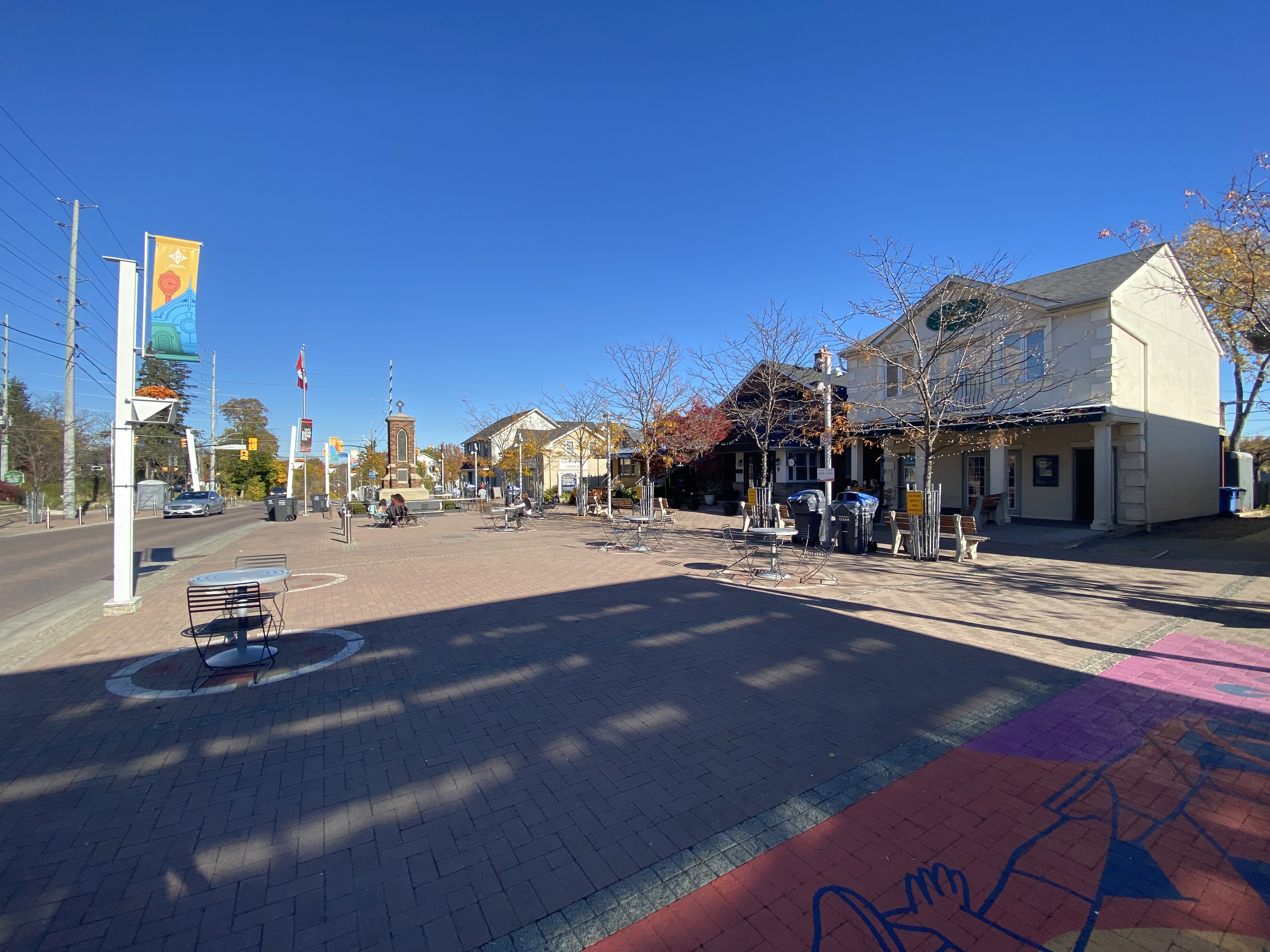
Streetsville Village Square

=== Features ===
Streetsville is nicknamed "The Village in the City", and features local shops, restaurants, community facilities, entertainment, schools, parks, and houses.

=== Bread and Honey Festival ===
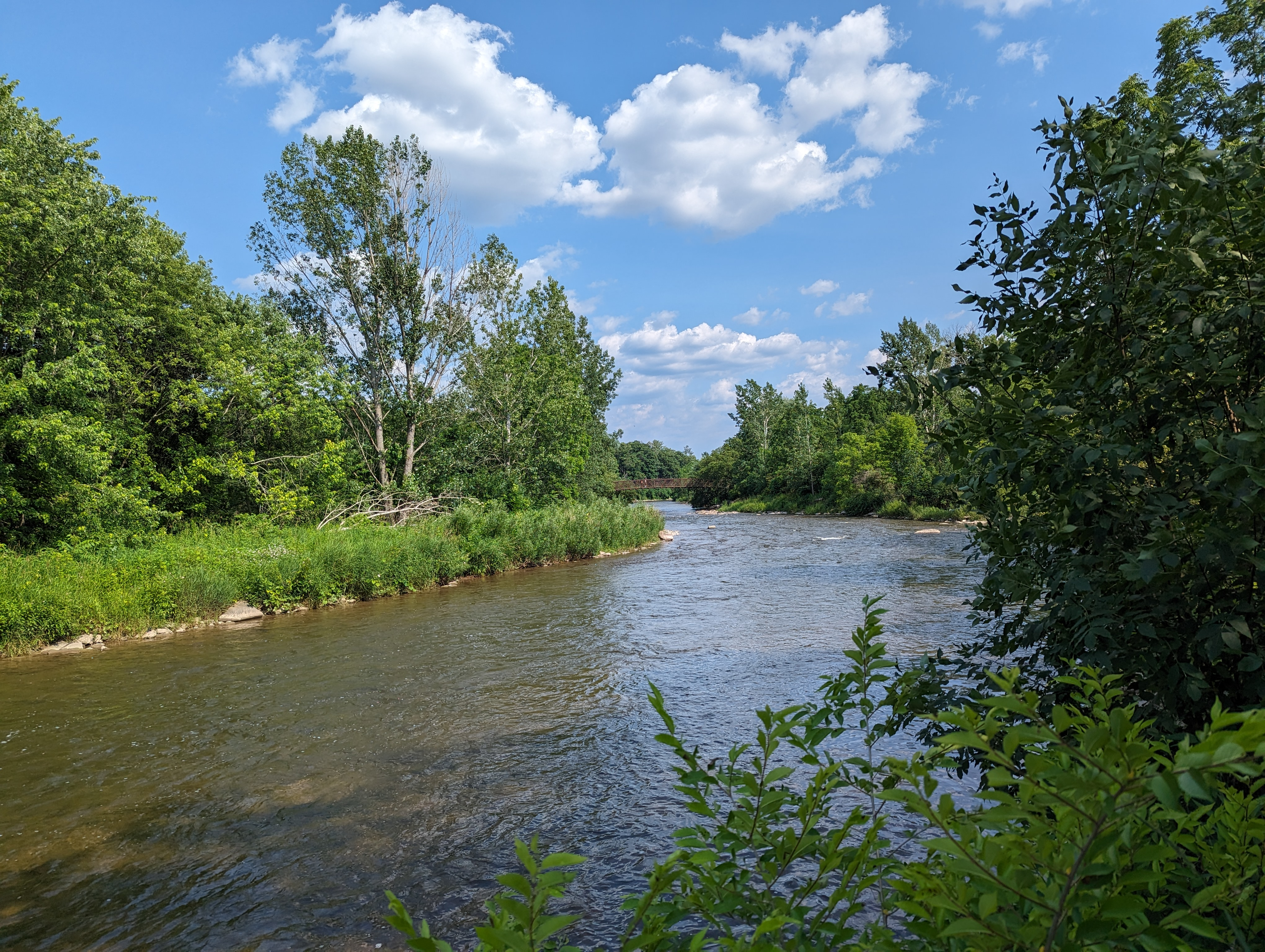
Streetsville Memorial Park

In 1973, Streetsville held the first Bread and Honey Festival. This was an acknowledgement to the town's history and its involvement with milling as Kraft Canada and ADM Milling had well-established flourmills in the area. The festival become an annual event being held on the first weekend of June. The festival is held at Streetsville Memorial Park. Some of the events include live musical performances, a carnival run, a consumers market, a pancake breakfast, and parade. The festival went on hiatus in 2020. It came back in 2022 as the Bread and Honey Street Festival and returned as a full festival in 2023.

=== Canada Day ===
Every July 1 at the Memorial Park dedicated to F.B. McFarren, the neighbourhood holds a local Canada Day celebration. There are various activities occurring throughout the afternoon, ranging from face-painting to dance performances. Local businesses sponsor and execute various performances throughout the evening and is then finished with a firework display occurring around 10pm.

=== Santa Claus Parade ===
The annual Mississauga Santa Claus Parade now takes place in Streetsville. The parade starts on Queen Street at Britannia Road and travels south through the village to disperse at various locations after the Church Street junction. The parade was founded in 1974.

=== Christmas Market ===
In 2016, the Streetsville BIA and City of Mississauga held its inaugural 'Christmas in the Village' Market in the Streetsville Village Square on the last weekend of November. After a two-year Renovation in 2014, the Streetsville Village Square now includes a covered stage, the town cenotaph and outdoor seating for residents. The 'Christmas in the Village' Market includes food and gift vendors, live entertainment and the lighting of the towns Christmas Tree.

== Sports ==
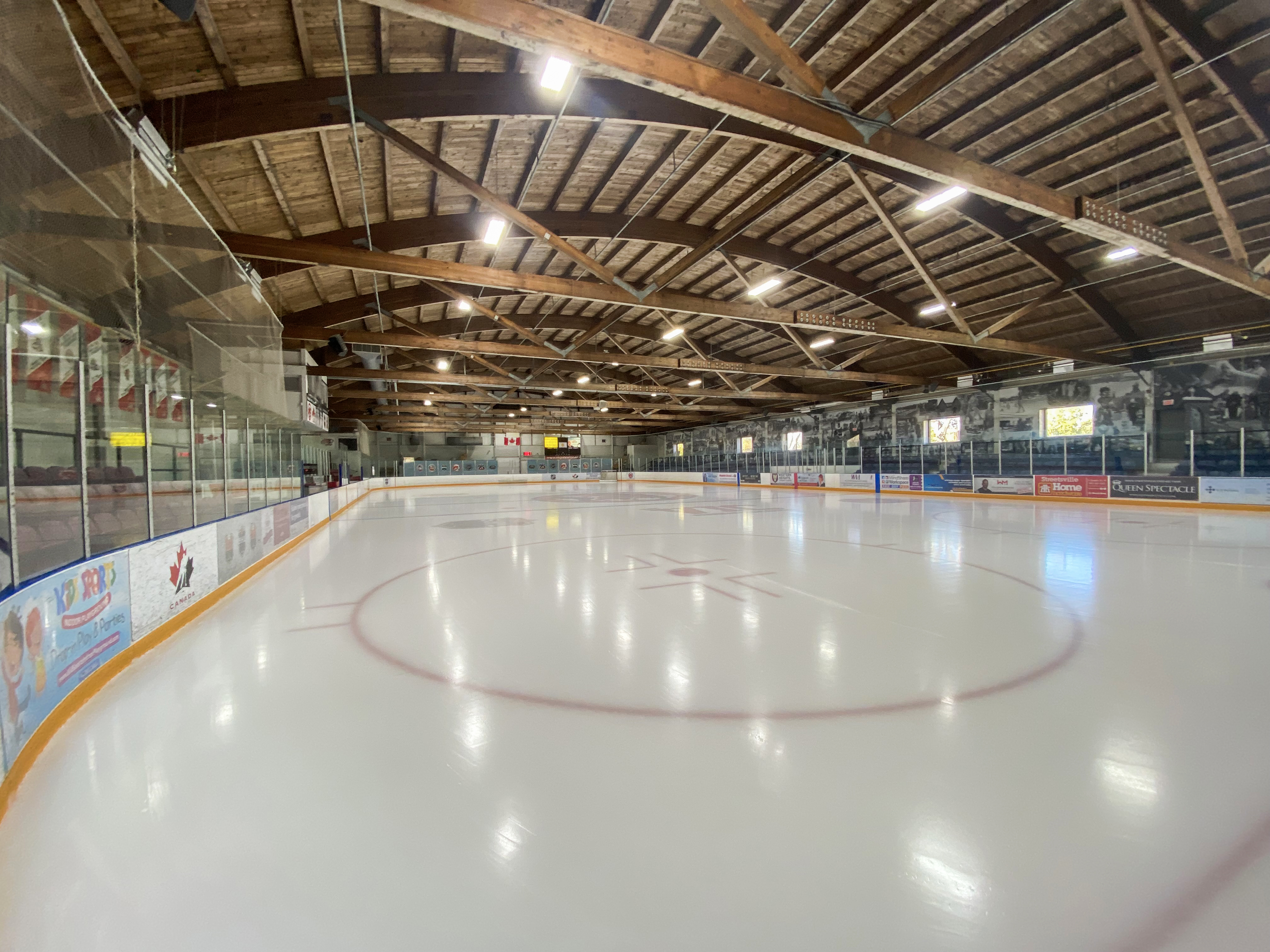
Vic Johnston Arena

=== Ice hockey ===
The Streetsville and District Minor Hockey Association was established in 1946. Streetsville and seven other communities in the Toronto Township formed the Toronto Township Hockey League (TTHL) In 1962 the Streetsville and District Minor Hockey Association began to play in their new rink, Vic Johnston Community Centre. During the early years the Streetsville's Hockey team played under many names including, the Thunderbirds, Hounds, Tigers, Kings, and Panthers. In the 1967-68 season they left the TTHL. Streetsville iced five teams to play in the Tri-County A league of the Ontario Minor Hockey Association (OMHA) at the start of the 1968-69 season. That first season Streetsville won two championships. In the late 1980s, the President and late Bill Mann embarked on a name search for the Streetsville Rep teams. The name chosen was Tigers, and from that date on the name and team colours were adopted into the Rules and Regulations. The Tiger logo was designed and adopted in 1990 and has been incorporated into all tiger equipment, sweaters, pants, equipment bags, hats and jackets. The Tigers moved to the OMHA Central AAA league in 1991-1992 where they competed for four years. Since joining the GTHL, the Tiger teams have been very competitive winning two Divisional Champions, one Carnation Cup and one City Championship. 2006 the Streetsville Tigers Celebrated 60 years of hockey in Streetsville.

Streetsville had a successful Junior A hockey club the Streetsville Derbys which played in the Vic Johnson Arena. At the conclusion of the 2007 season, the Derbys moved to a new location, Westwood Arena, in Rexdale, Ontario. In 2011 with the Ontario Junior Hockey League's goal of contraction, the Derby's merged with the Cobourg Cougars.

Streetsville Thistles was a successful lacrosse club in the 1890s.

==== Vic Johnston Arena ====
The arena opened in 1961, and is used for hockey, skating and other community events. It is an independent, non-profit arena. In 2008, the arena received an $8-million-dollar renovation.

== See also ==
- Mississauga—Streetsville, electoral riding
  - Gagan Sikand, former MP for Mississauga—Streetsville
  - Nina Tangri, MPP for Mississauga—Streetsville
- Streetsville Secondary School
- St. Joseph Secondary School (Mississauga)
- Hazel McCallion Senior Public School
- Vista Heights Public School
- Russell Langmaid Public School
- Billy Talent
