= Toronto Township, Ontario =

Former municipality in Ontario, Canada

Coordinates: 43°36′21″N 79°40′23″W

Toronto Township is a former municipality now mostly part of Mississauga, Ontario, Canada, with its northern extremity now a part of Brampton. It was directly west of but not part of the City of Toronto (which was named York at the time of the township's establishment), and its land area makes up the majority of present-day Mississauga.

== History ==
Upper Canada officials signed a treaty for 84,000 acres (340 km^{2}) of land from the Mississauga First Nation, in what would become parts of Trafalgar and Toronto Townships on August 2, 1805. Further treaty purchases would follow to 1820, with a final portion being abandoned by the Mississaugas in 1847.

Land was surveyed, with agricultural lots being created. Hamlets would gradually form.

Toronto Township was administrated by the Home District Court of Quarter Sessions, in York, and had little direct authority. Legislation in 1841 allowed elected bodies, and districts were dissolved in 1850 in favour of Counties. Toronto Township's council met as a unit from 1844 on, but gained further independence in 1850.

Peel County became the County of York, Second Riding in 1850, and a distinct provisional county in 1852. Full separation was made in 1867.

Following rapid urbanization, the Township incorporated as a Town in 1968. It was renamed Mississauga after a public vote. Mississauga became a city seven years later in 1974 after merging with the towns of Streetsville and Port Credit, and ceded its northernmost area (and thus lands formerly part of the township) to Brampton.

== See also ==
- List of townships in Ontario
