= List of people from Brampton =

This is a list of people from Brampton, Ontario, Canada.

Note that this list largely does not include players from the Brampton Beast ECHL hockey team. Also not included are people who were post-secondary students who did not live locally before or after, such as Kent Monkman and Patrick McKenna.

== A ==
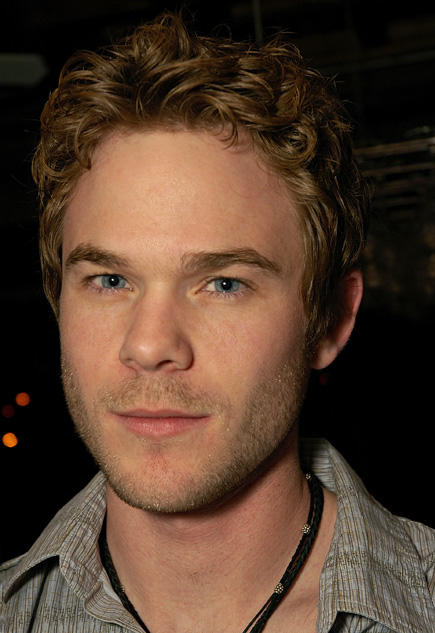
Shawn Ashmore

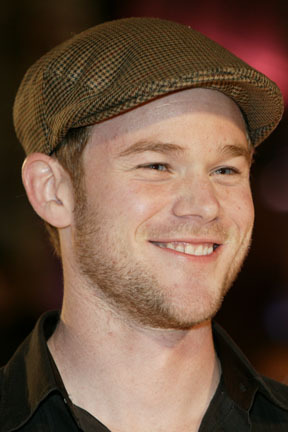
Aaron Ashmore

- Lee Aaron (b. 1962 as Karen Lynn Greening), rock and jazz singer, raised in Brampton
- Sam Acheampong (b. 1996), CFL football player
- Jeff Adams (b. 1970), lawyer, retired wheelchair athlete
- Stephen Adekolu (b. 1989), actor, retired CFL football player, BC Lions
- Oluniké Adeliyi (b. 1977), actress
- Adebola Adeyeye (b. 1999), retired basketball player, Nigeria national team
- AHI (b. Ahkinoah Habah Izarh), folk music singer-songwriter
- James Albert Manning Aikins (1851–1929), lawyer, politician, and lieutenant governor of Manitoba
- Ayo Akinola (b. 2000), Swiss Challenge League soccer player, Canadian national team
- Ohenewa Akuffo (b. 1979), entrepreneur (fitness studio), retired wrestler
- Keven Alemán (b. 1994), Thai League 1 soccer player
- Charles Allen (b. 1977), retired track and field athlete
- Leaford Allen (b. 1995), League1 Ontario soccer player
- Clyde Alves, dancer, actor and singer
- Stella Ambler (b. 1966), former MP, Mississauga South (2011–2015)
- Troy Amos-Ross (b. 1975), entrepreneur (daycare), retired boxer
- Trey Anthony (b. 1974), playwright of da Kink in My Hair
- Caroline Helena Armington (1875–1939), etcher
- Thomas W. Armstrong (1858–1927), Wisconsin State Assembly
- Lise Arsenault (c. 1954), retired gymnast, team gymnastics at the 1976 Summer Olympics
- Olu Ashaolu (b. 1988), retired basketball player
- Aaron Ashmore (b. 1979), actor, Smallville
- Shawn Ashmore (b. 1979), actor, X-Men movie series, Terry Fox in Terry
- Sarkis Assadourian (b. 1948), politician, first Armenian-Canadian to be elected to the House of Commons
- Sid C. Attard (b. 1950), Thoroughbred horse racing trainer

== B ==
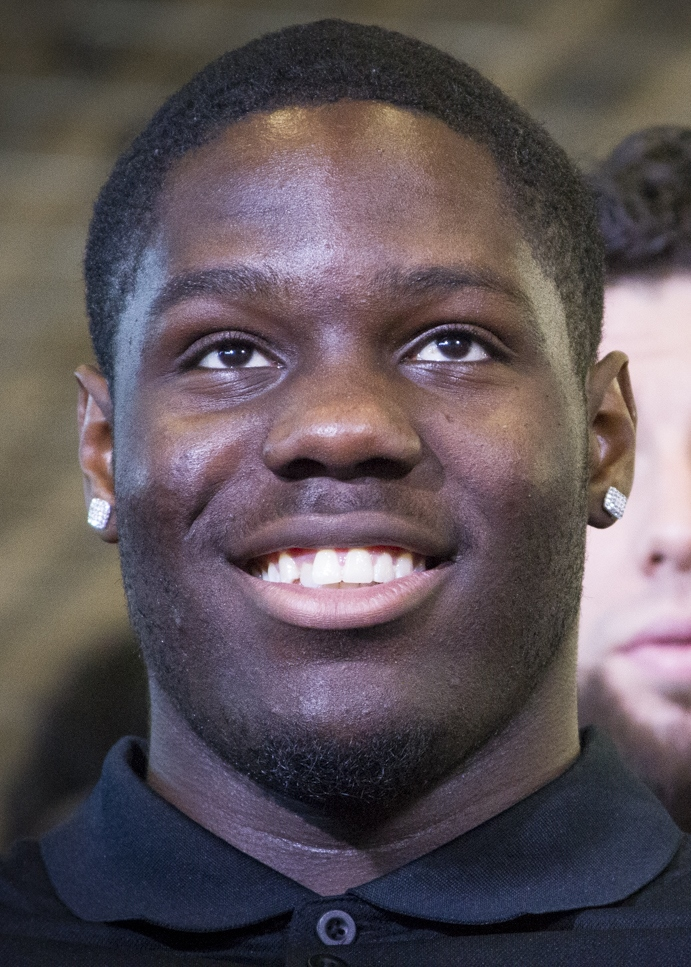
Anthony Bennett

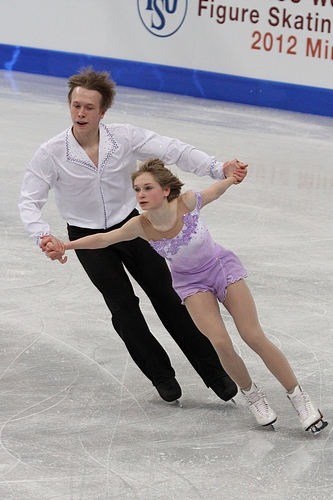
Hayleigh Bell

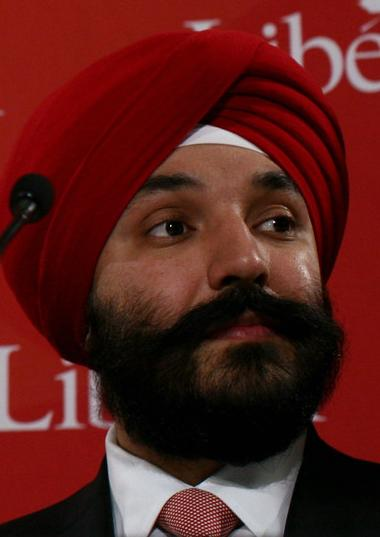
Navdeep Bains

- Michael Bailey (b. 1982), CFL drafted football player
- Scott Bailey (b. 1970), curler
- Navdeep Bains (b. 1977), politician, MP and former Minister of Innovation, Science and Economic Development
- Rupan Bal (b. 1990, Rupanjit Bal), actor and comedian
- Daundre Barnaby (1990–2015), Canadian Olympic track and field
- Clark Barnes (b. 2000), CFL football wide receiver
- Donald N. Bastian, retired bishop of the Free Methodist Church of North America
- Andy Bathgate (1932–2016), ice hockey player
- Colleen Beaumier (b. 1944), politician
- Larry Beauregard (1956–1985), flautist
- Charles Bediako (b. 2002), Canadian national basketball player
- Anthony Bennett (b. 1993), basketball player, Bahraini Premier League basketball player, drafted first overall in the 2013 NBA draft
- Matthew Bennett (b. 1993), retired NLL lacrosse player
- Sim Bhullar (b. 1992), basketball, T1 League, former NBA player
- Catherine Black, actress
- Justine Blainey (b. 1973), fought in court for the right for females to participate in male sports
- Jahvon Blair (b. 1998), LNB Pro B basketball player
- Ronald Bloore (1925–2009), member of the Order of Canada; organizer and member of the "Regina Five" (1960)
- Joanne Boland (b. 1975), actress
- Luciano Borsato (b. 1966), retired hockey player
- Mark Boswell (b. 1977), retired Olympic high-jumper
- Bernadette Bowyer (b. 1966), retired field hockey player, Olympian
- Robert William Bradford (1923–2023), C.M., former Director of the National Aviation Museum
- Nathaniel Branden (1930–2014), psychotherapist, best known as a former associate of Ayn Rand and founder of the Nathaniel Branden Institute
- Ransford Brempong (b. 1981), retired Canadian national and CEBL basketball player
- Bonnie Briggs (c. 1952/1953–2017), affordable housing advocate, poet
- Patrick Brown (b. 1978), former leader of the Progressive Conservative Party of Ontario, former MPP for Simcoe North, current mayor of Brampton
- Ross Brownridge (b. 1957), retired EHL, AHL ice hockey player
- Claire Buchanan (b. 1987), member of Team Canada at the IPC's first women's sledge hockey tournament
- Kadeisha Buchanan (b. 1995), English Women's Super League soccer player, Canadian women's national team
- Tajon Buchanan (b. 1999), La Liga soccer player forward, Canadian national team
- Krista Buecking (b. 1982), Los Angeles-based visual artist
- Stan Butler (b. 1956), OHL ice hockey coach

== C ==
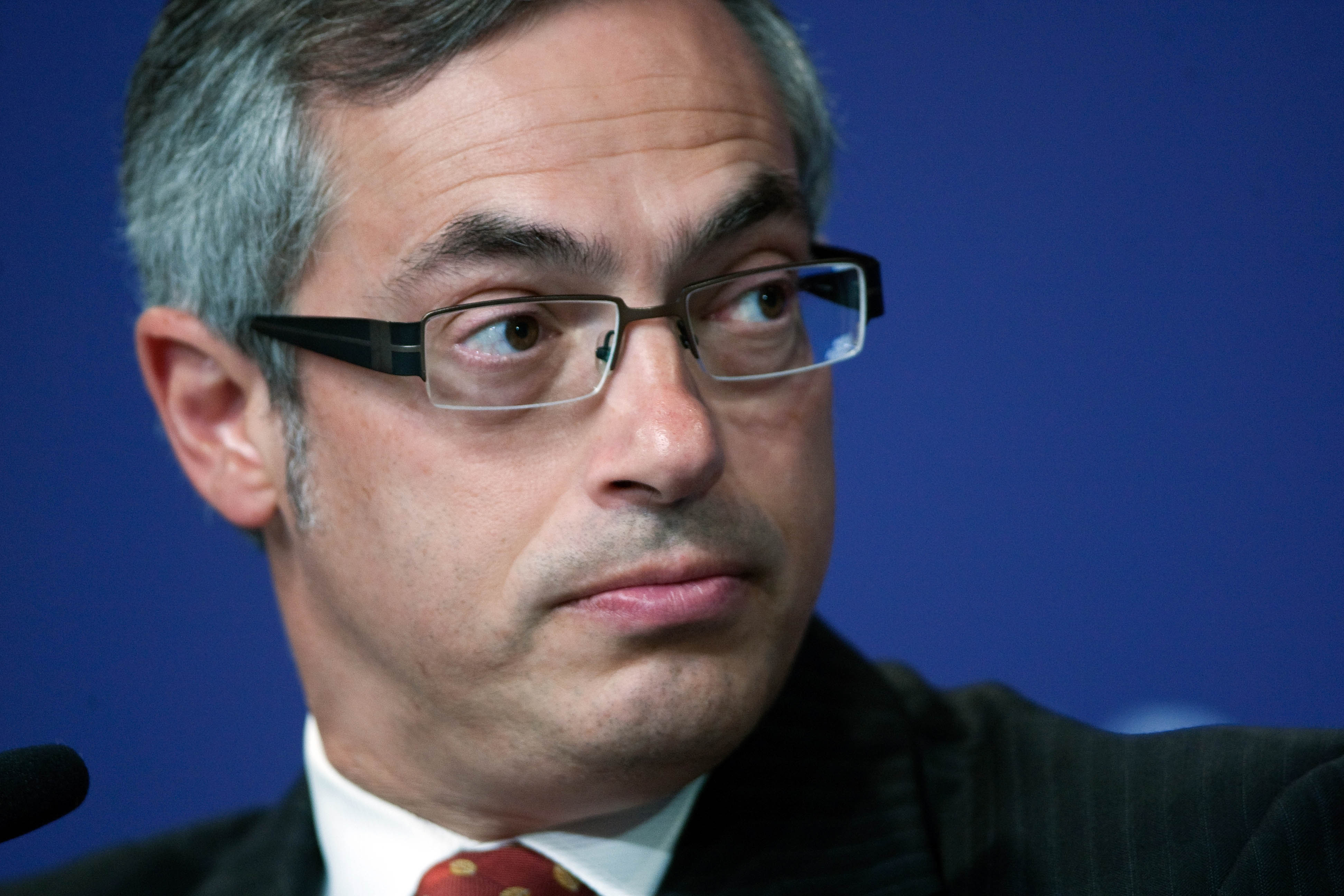
Tony Clement

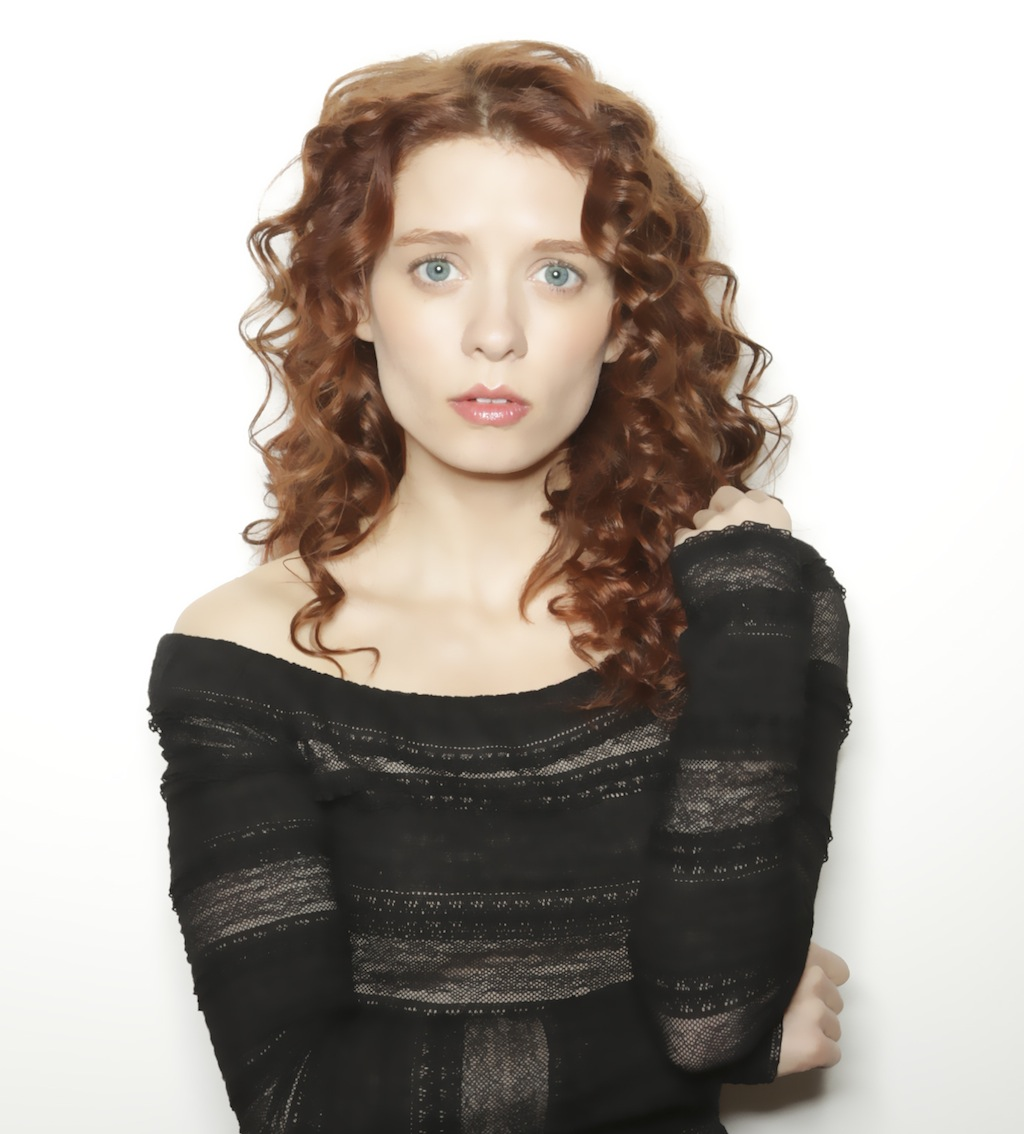
Lara Jean Chorostecki

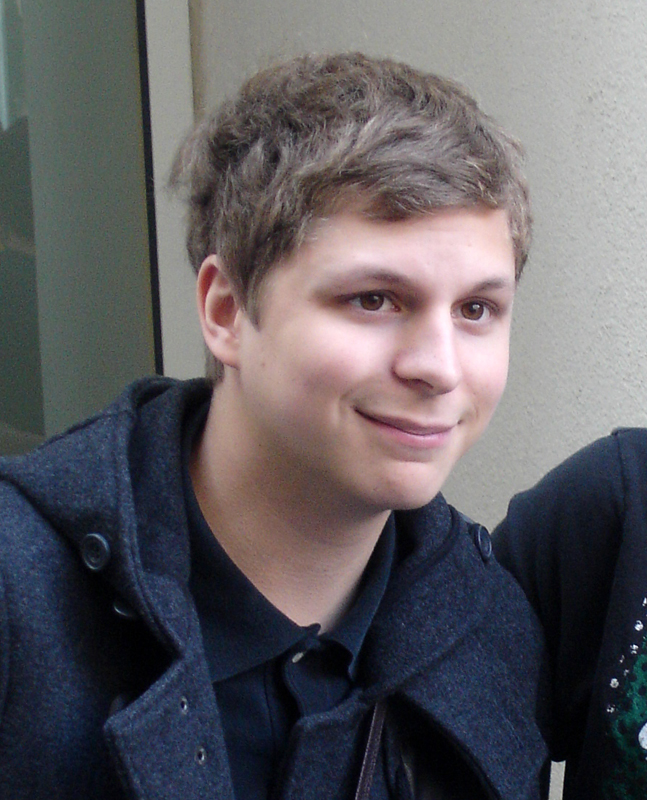
Michael Cera

- Shawna Cain, Christian R&B singer
- Bryan Cameron (b. 1989), retired ECHL hockey player
- Alexander Franklin Campbell, mayor of Brampton
- Cassie Campbell (b. 1973), broadcaster, retired hockey player (CWHL and Olympics)
- Lauren Campbell (b. 1981), triathlete
- Ryan Campbell, CLL lacrosse player
- Alessia Cara (b. 1996), singer and songwriter
- Denise Carriere (b. 1970), retired softball player
- David Carruthers, retired curler
- Anne Laurel Carter (b. 1953), author
- Don Cash (b. 1978), rap artist, record producer
- Andrew Cassels (b. 1969), retired hockey player
- Michael Cera (b. 1988), comedic actor, born and raised in Brampton; a regular on the television series Arrested Development; starred in the movies Superbad, Juno, and Scott Pilgrim vs. the World, in which Brampton is mentioned as an in-joke
- Ena Chadha (b. 1967), human rights lawyer
- William Chant (1895–1976), Alberta and British Columbia politician
- Keshia Chanté (b. 1988), singer, Juno Award winner
- Jay Chapman (b. 1994), USL Championship club soccer player
- Samuel Charters (1863–1943), newspaper publisher, mayor of Brampton, MPP, MP
- Kenneth Chisholm (1829–1906), businessman, MPP, reeve of Brampton
- Lara Jean Chorostecki (b. 1984), actress, Hannibal
- Samuel Clarke (1853–1928), MPP, Northumberland West (1887–1890), mayor of Cobourg
- Stephen Clarke (b. 1973), retired Olympic swimmer
- Tony Clement (b. 1961), former MP, former MPP, former president of the Treasury Board
- Andrew Coe (b. 1996), rugby union player, Major League Rugby and Canadian national team
- Jason Collett, singer-songwriter, member of Broken Social Scene
- Shay Colley (b. 1996), basketball, Ligue Féminine de Basketball and Team Canada
- Ashley Comeau (b. 1984), actress, comedian
- Darren Copeland (b. 1968), electroacoustic music composer
- Peter Corner (b. 1968), curler, skip
- Paulo Costanzo (b. 1978), actor, Joey, Royal Pains
- John Coyne (1836–1873), MPP for Peel
- Dave Cranmer (b. 1944), retired CFL player, taught at Bramalea Secondary School
- Herbert Crawford (1878–1946), Alberta politician
- Sam Cureatz (b. 1948), MPP, Durham East (1987–1990)
- Philip J. Currie (b. 1949), palaeontologist and museum curator who helped found the Royal Tyrrell Museum of Palaeontology
- Chris Cuthbert (b. 1957), sports play-by-play announcer

== D ==
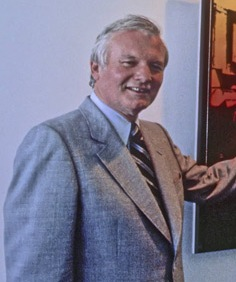
Bill Davis

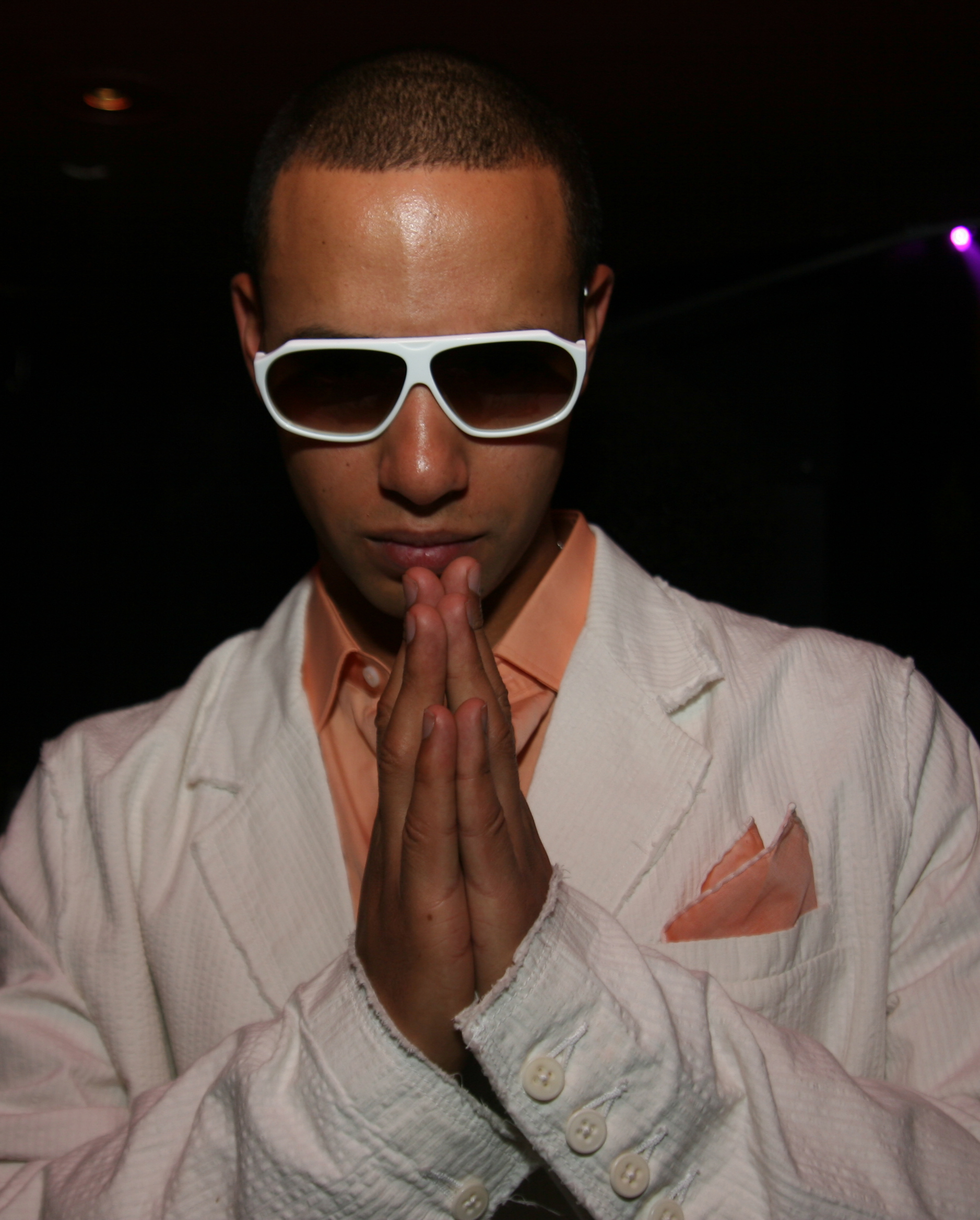
Director X

- Peter DaCunha (b. 2003), child actor
- Kaylee Dakers (b. 1991), swimmer
- Denton Daley (b. 1982), cruiserweight boxer
- George Dance, political candidate, leader of the Libertarian Party of Canada (1991–1993)
- Anim Dankwah (b. 2000), CFL football offensive lineman
- Mike Danton (b. 1980), former MHL hockey player, now international, jailed for conspiracy to commit murder
- Tracy Dawson, actor
- Promise David (b. 2001), soccer player, Belgian Pro League
- William G. Davis (1929–2021), premier of Ontario
- Malikae Dayes (b. 1999), soccer player
- Bob Dechert (b. 1958), former MP for Mississauga—Erindale
- Vincent DeGiorgio, lyricist, former record executive
- Patrick Denipitiya (1934–2013), Sri Lankan musician
- Tanya Dennis (b. 1985), Canada national soccer team
- Dayna Deruelle (b. 1982), curler
- Mark DeSantis (b. 1972), coach for Brampton Beast
- Aminder Dhaliwal (b. 1988), cartoonist and animator
- Ruby Dhalla (b. 1974), Liberal MP for Brampton—Springdale
- Vic Dhillon (b. c. 1969), politician, MPP for Brampton West
- Kirk Diamond, dancehall and reggae musician
- Director X (b. 1975, Julien Christian Lutz), music video director
- Stéphanie Dixon (b. 1984), Paralympic swimmer
- Danilo Djuricic (b. 1999), basketball player
- Andy Donato (b. 1937), editorial cartoonist, Toronto Sun
- Naheed Dosani, palliative care physician
- Steve Duplantis (1972–2008), professional golf caddy
- Mike Dwyer (b. 1957), NHL, WHA hockey player

== E ==
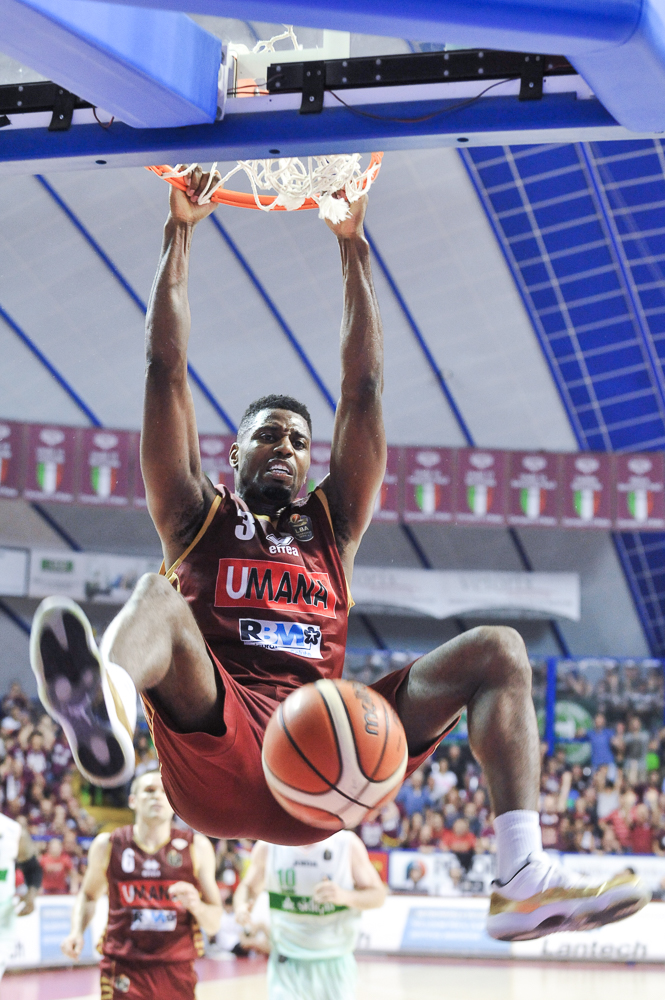
Melvin Ejim

- Chuck Ealey (b. 1950), former CFL player, once the winningest college football quarterback
- Joseph Earngey (1870–1939), mayor of Kenora (1915–1918), MPP for Kenora (1926–1929), newspaper publisher
- Mike Edem (b. 1989), former CFL player
- Nathaniel Edwards (b. 2002), MLS Next Pro soccer player
- Kenny Ejim (1994–2022), former CEBL basketball player
- Melvin Ejim (b. 1991), ABA basketball player
- Faith Ekakitie (b. 1993), former CFL player
- Todd Elik (b. 1966), former NHL, international hockey player
- Emay (b. 1991, Mubarik Gyenne-Bayere), rapper
- Dylan Ennis (b. 1991), basketball player
- Tyler Ennis (b. 1994), chosen 18th overall in the 2014 NBA draft; plays in the Israeli Basketball Premier League

== F ==
- Daniel Fabrizi (b. 1992), association football player defender
- James Robinson Fallis (1871–1935), MPP, Peel (1913–1916), livestock dealer
- Jordan Faria (b. 2000), soccer player
- David Feiss (b. 1959), creator of Cow and Chicken and I Am Weasel, raised in town
- Chris Felix (b. 1964), NHL hockey player
- Susan Fennell, former mayor of Brampton
- Paul Ferreira (b. 1973), former NDP MPP
- James Fleming (1839–1902), MP, Peel (1882–1887), lawyer and teacher
- Mike Forbes (b. 1957), NHL hockey player
- Sgt Lorne Ford (1969–2002), wounded in the Tarnak Farm incident of the War in Afghanistan
- Steve Fox, singer/songwriter
- Tenyka Francique (b. 1991), footballer, Guyana women's national team
- Raz Fresco (b. 1995), rapper and record producer
- Doug Frith (1945–2009), former MP for Sudbury, former president of the Canadian Motion Picture Distributors Association
- David Frost, NHLPA sports agent, aka Jim McCauley

== G ==
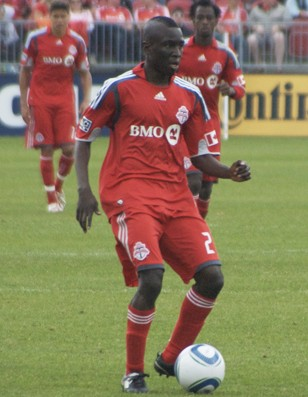
Gabe Gala

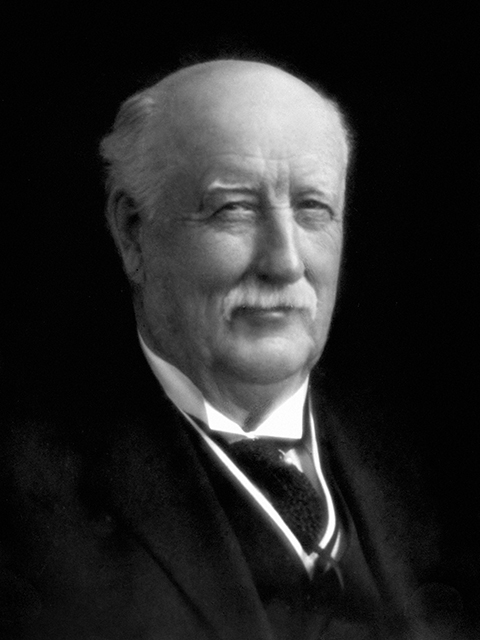
Sir William James Gage

- Sir William James Gage (1849–1921), educator, entrepreneur and philanthropist
- Gabe Gala (b. 1989), MLS soccer
- Larisa Galadza (b. 1971), ambassador of Canada to Ukraine
- Anthony Gale (b. 1993), sledge hockey player, 2014 Olympic bronze medalist
- Jonita Gandhi (b. 1989), Bollywood singer
- William H. Gardiner (1861–1935), photographer
- Steve Gatzos (b. 1961), NHL hockey player
- Sudarshan Gautam (b. 1978), first person to summit Mount Everest, without arms or prosthetics
- Jordan Gavaris (b. 1989), actor, Orphan Black and The Lake
- Omar Gandhi, architect known for rural vernacular architecture
- Amarjeet Gill (b. 1967 or 1968), MP for Brampton West
- Parm Gill (b. 1974), former MP for Brampton—Springdale
- Raminder Gill (b. 1950 or 1951), former MPP for Bramalea—Gore—Malton—Springdale
- Grandy Glaze (b. 1992), NBLC basketball player
- Jared Gomes (b. 1988), free agent hockey player, formerly AHL, ECHL
- Camila Gonzalez (b. 1997), model, television host and beauty pageant titleholder
- Bal Gosal (b. 1961), politician MP for Bramalea—Gore—Malton, Minister of State-Sport
- Rohan Goulbourne (b. 2002), soccer player
- Mikyla Grant-Mentis (b. 1998), PWHL ice hockey player
- Tyler Graovac (b. 1993), AHL hockey player
- Gordon Graydon (1897–1953), MP for Peel, Conservative opposition leader, alternate UN delegate for Canada, lawyer
- Sabrina Grdevich (b. 1971), actor, Traders
- Dave Greszczyszyn (b. 1979), skeleton racer
- Raj Grewal (b. 1985), former MP for Brampton East

== H ==
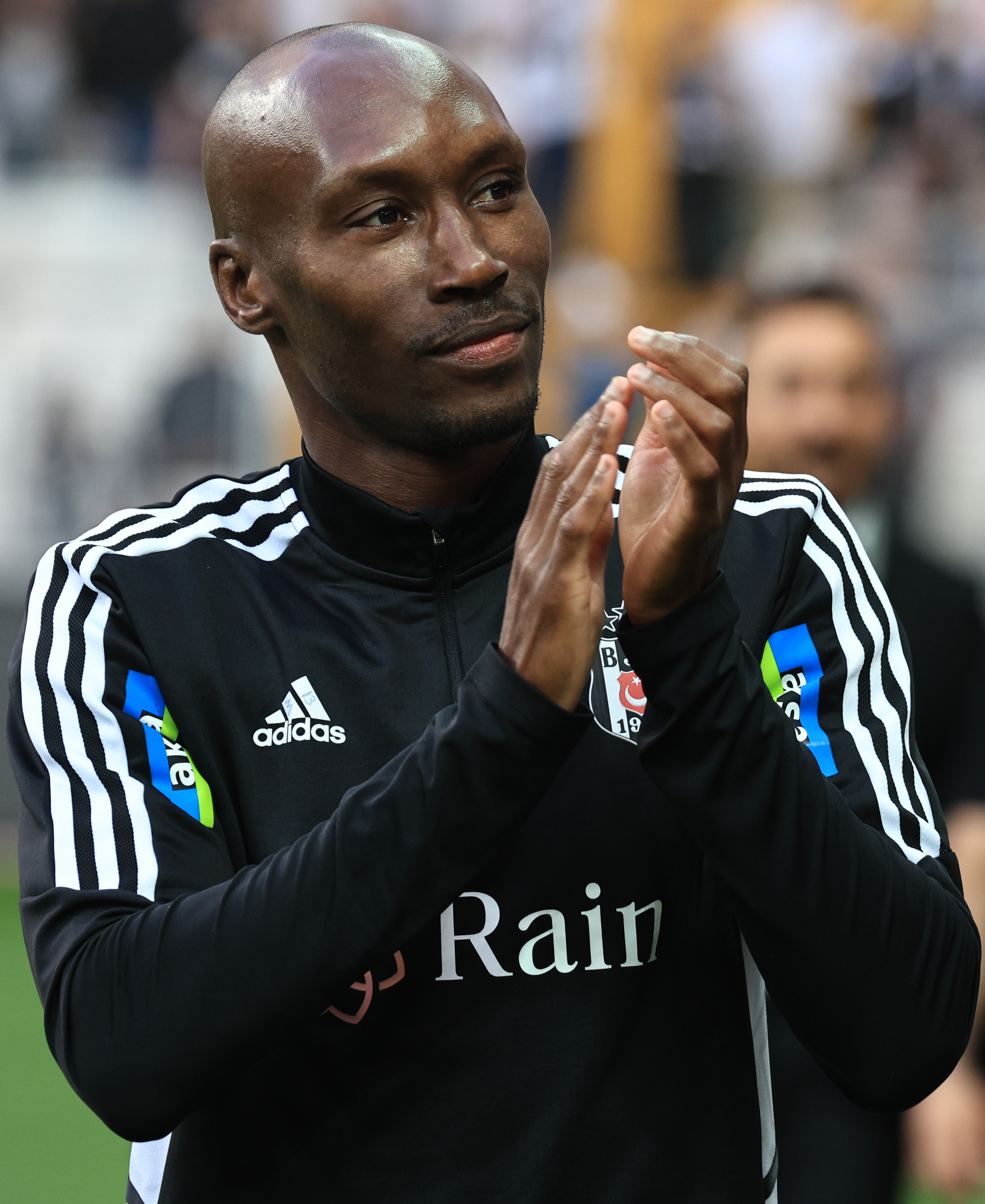
Atiba Hutchinson

- John Haggert (1822–1887), first mayor of Brampton, businessman
- Ijah Halley (b. 2001), League1 Ontario soccer player
- Rachel Hannah (b. 1986), retired distance runner, Pan Am bronze medallist
- Shane Harte (b. 1996), actor, Lost & Found Music Studios
- Daniel Harper (b. 1989), retired track and field athlete
- Mike Harris (b. 1967), retired curler and commentator
- David Hearn (b. 1979), PGA Tour golfer
- Charles Hefferon (1878–1932), Olympic marathon runner
- Doneil Henry (b. 1993), retired soccer player
- Jill Hetherington (b. 1964), retired tennis player and coach
- Tyson Heung (b. 1979), retired German Olympic speed skater in 2006, 2010
- Bettie Hewes (1924–2001), MLA, Edmonton-Gold Bar (1986–1997)
- W. W. Hiltz (1873–1936), mayor of Toronto (1924–1925)
- Justin Hodgman (b. 1988), retired EIHL hockey player
- Junior Hoilett (b. 1990, David Hoilett), soccer player, Canadian national team
- Nick Holder (b. 1969), underground house/hip-hop DJ, raised in Brampton
- Karla Homolka (b. 1970), murderer, briefly lived with her relatives in their Brampton condominium
- Sandy Hudson, political activist, writer, co-founder of Black Lives Matter movement in Canada
- Tamar Huggins (b. 1986), tech entrepreneur, author and educator
- Shaan Hundal (b. 1999), CPL soccer player
- Patrick Husbands (b. 1973), Thoroughbred horseracing jockey
- Ashfaq Hussain (b. 1951), Urdu-language poet
- Atiba Hutchinson (b. 1983), former soccer player
- Jayda Hylton-Pelaia (b. 1998), League1 Ontario footballer, Jamaica women's national team

== J ==
- Ric Jackman (b. 1978), NHL ice hockey defenceman
- Samuel Jacob Jackson (1848–1942), Manitoba politician
- Billy Jamieson (1954–2011), treasure and antique dealer, reality television personality
- Mark Janoschak (b. 1968), figure skater
- Linda Jeffrey (b. c. 1958), former mayor of Brampton, former MPP for Brampton-Springdale and cabinet minister
- Colin Jenkins (b. 1983), Olympic triathlete
- Karl Jennings (b. 1979), hurdler
- Jamil Jivani (b. 1987), member of Parliament for Durham
- Hakeem Johnson (b. 1994), CFL football player
- Levonte Johnson (b. 1999), MLS soccer player
- Rae Johnson (b. 1998), basketball journalist
- Shaq Johnson (b. 1993), CFL football player
- Randy Johnston (b. 1958), NHL hockey player
- Robert Johnston (1856–1913), farmer and politician, MP for Cardwell

== K ==
- Andrew Kania (b. 1987), former MP
- Alain Kashama (b. 1979), retired CFL, NFL, NCAA football player
- Fernand Kashama (b. 1985), retired CFL, NCAA football player
- Hakeem Kashama (b. 1978), retired CFL, NFL, NCAA football player
- Kalonji Kashama (b. 1991), retired CFL football player
- Rupi Kaur (b. 1992), poet
- Adam Keefe (b. 1984), hockey coach, retired hockey player
- Sheldon Keefe (b. 1980), NHL hockey coach, retired NHL hockey player
- William Parker Kennedy (1892–1968), labour leader, president of the Brotherhood of Railroad Trainmen, born in Huttonville
- Greg Kerr-Wilson (b. 1960 or 1961), bishop of Calgary, rector of the Church of the Holy Family, Brampton
- Arpan Khanna (b. 1990), MP for Oxford, former candidate in Brampton
- Kamal Khera, MP for Brampton West
- Grzegorz Kielsa (b. 1979), retired Polish Olympic boxer
- Chris Kowalczuk (b. 1985), retired CFL football guard
- Kuldip Kular (b. 1948), former MPP

== L ==
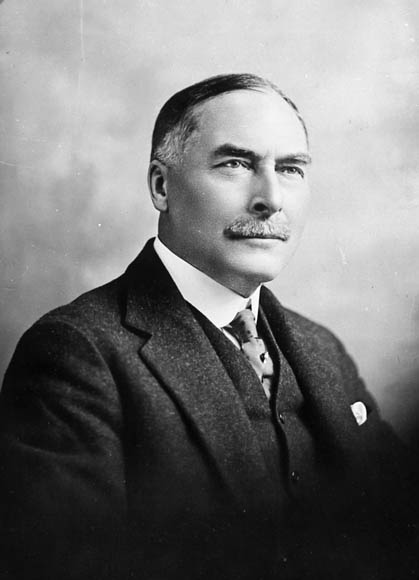
Sir James A. Lougheed

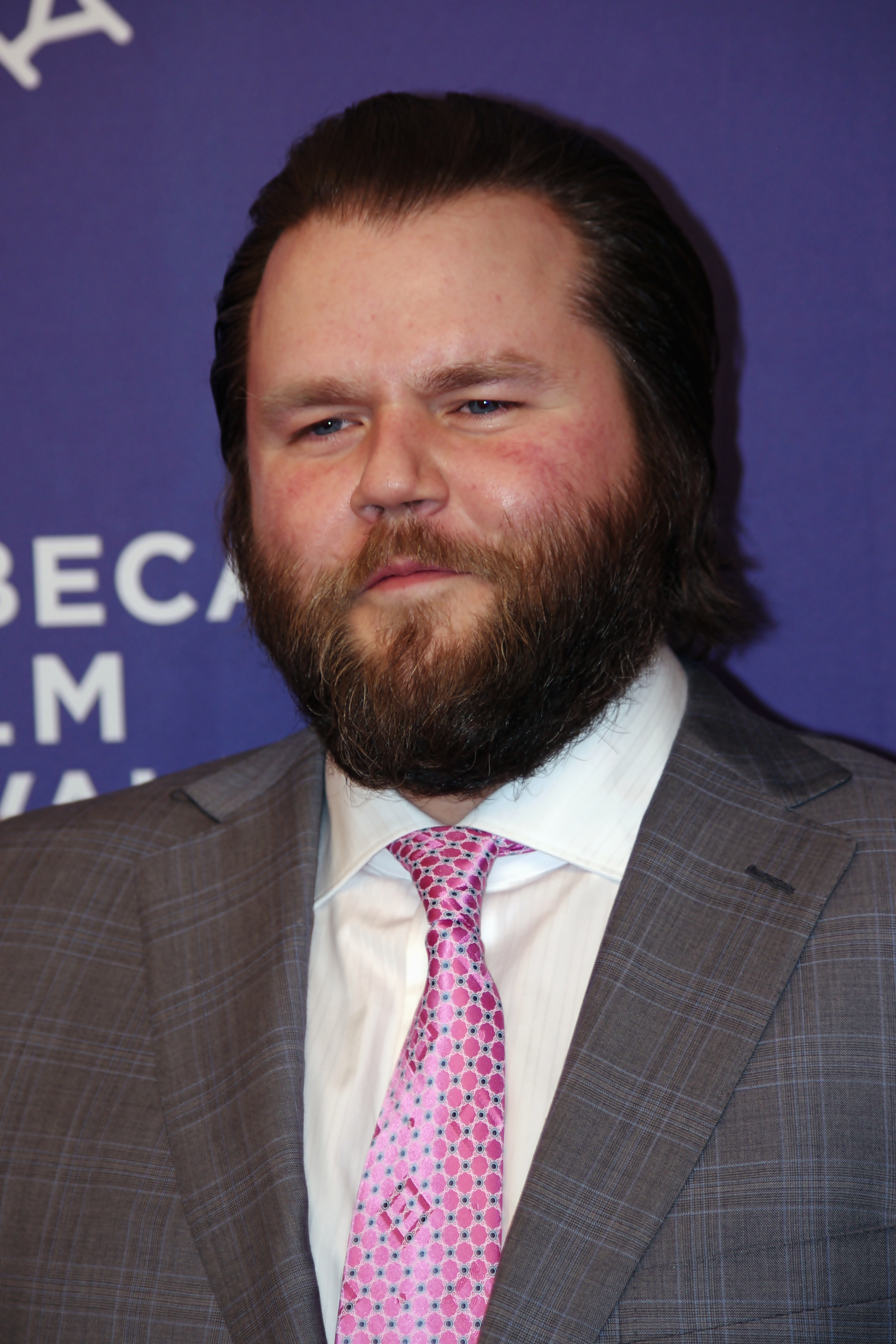
Tyler Labine

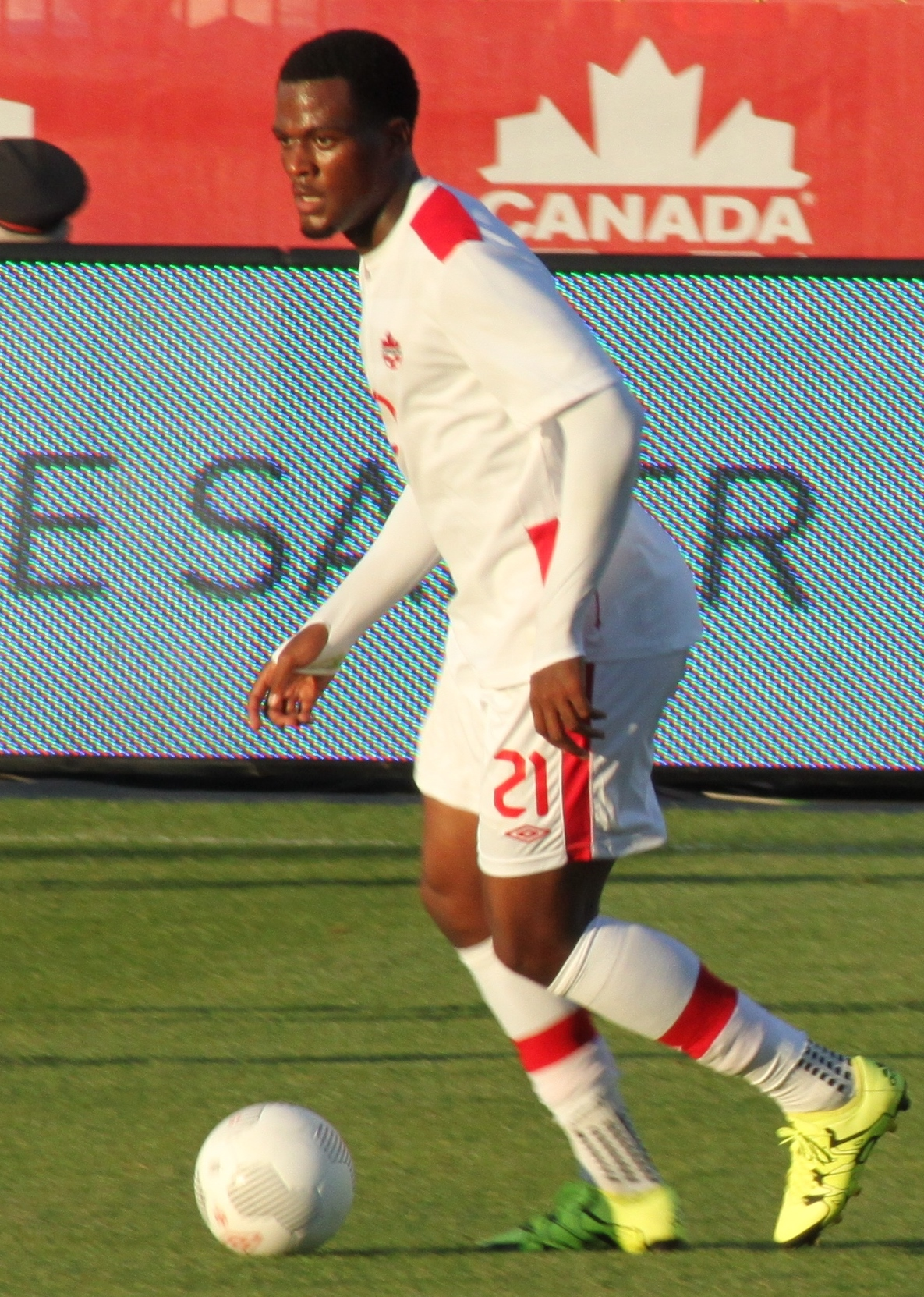
Cyle Larin

- Kyle Labine (b. 1983), actor, Grand Star
- Tyler Labine (b. 1978), actor, Animal Practice, Rise of the Planet of the Apes
- Tom Laidlaw (b. 1958), hockey player
- John Henderson Lamont (1865–1936), lawyer, politician, and judge
- Blair Lamora (b. 1997), actress
- Morgan Lander (b. 1982), lead singer for alternative metal group Kittie
- Tory Lanez (b. 1992 as Daystar Peterson), rapper, producer
- Trevor Large (b. 1980), ice hockey coach, former ice hockey player
- Cyle Larin (b. 1995), soccer, MLS and Canada national team
- Clayton Latham (b. 1980), long jumper
- A. J. Lawson (b. 2000), Toronto Raptors basketball player
- Kailey Leila (b. 1996), footballer, Guyana women's national team
- Kris Lemche (b. 1978), Gemini Award winning actor, Emily of New Moon
- Exco Levi (b. Wayne Ford Levy), reggae musician
- Martin Lindsay (b. 1982), boxer
- George Locke (1870–1937), chief librarian of the Toronto Public Library
- Dr. Lawrence Loh, Region of Peel Medical Officer of Health, previously practiced family medicine in Brampton
- Jason Loo, cartoonist and comics writer
- Sir James A. Lougheed (1854–1925), Alberta politician and businessman, born in Brampton, before serving 30 years in Senate, including as leader of the Opposition in the Senate
- Nicole Lyn (b. 1978), Student Bodies, married to Dulé Hill
- Shannon Lynn (b. 1985), Canadian–born Scottish international football goalkeeper
- Annabel Lyon (b. 1971), writer

== M ==
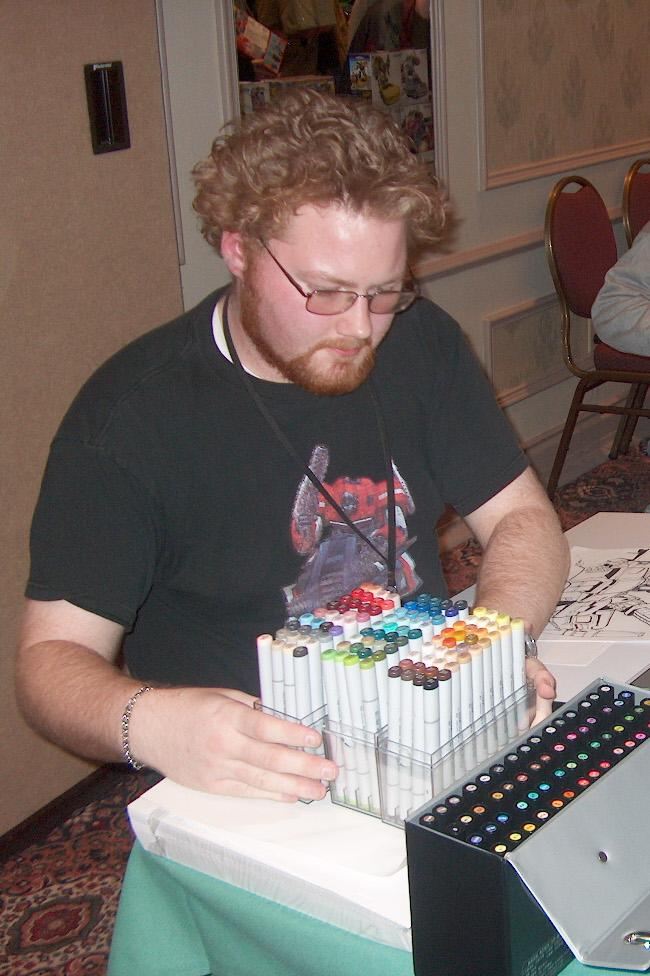
Alex Milne

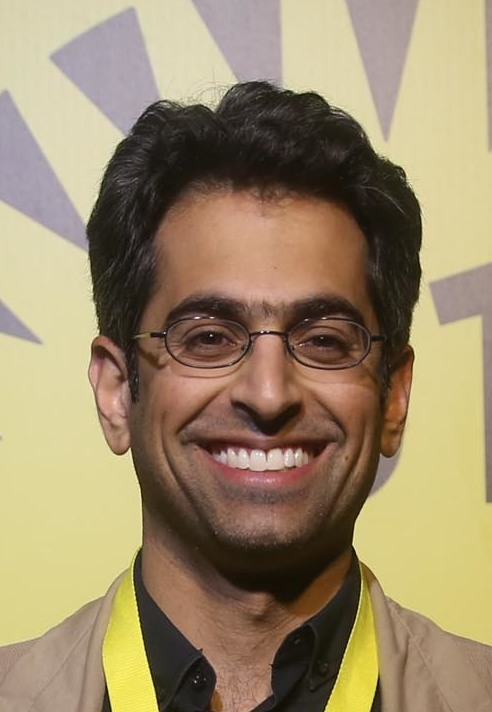
Richie Mehta

- Shanyn MacEachern (b. 1980), Olympic gymnast
- Lex MacKenzie (1885–1970), veteran and MPP, York North (1945–1967), died at Brampton
- Harinder Malhi (b. c. 1981), MPP for Brampton—Springdale
- Graeme McCarrel, curler
- John McDermid (1940–2024), various cabinet positions under Brian Mulroney
- Scott McGillivray (b. 1978), carpenter and television host
- Graham McGregor (b. 1993), member of Provincial Parliament
- Judi McLeod (b. 1944), journalist
- Simon Mangos (b. 1980), ice hockey player
- Baj Maan (b. 2000), soccer player
- Jahkeele Marshall-Rutty (b. 2004), soccer player
- Davie Mason (b. 1984), former football player
- Rob Maver (b. 1986), retired CFL football player
- William Armstrong McCulla (1837–1923), industrialist, building contractor and political figure
- Michael Meeks (b. 1972), international basketball player
- Richie Mehta, film director, Genie nominee
- John Meredith (1933–2000), abstract expressionist painter
- Jerome Messam (b. 1985), CFL football player
- John Metchie III (b. 2000), NFL football player
- Royce Metchie (b. 1996), CFL football player
- Wayne Middaugh (b. 1967), curler
- Erin Mielzynski (b. 1990), World Cup slalom race winner
- Haviah Mighty (b. 1992), rapper
- Liam Millar (b. 1999), U18 Premier League soccer player
- Ken Millin (b. 1975), lacrosse player
- Alex Milne, comic book artist
- Massimo Mirabelli (b. 1991), NASL footballer
- Rohinton Mistry (b. 1952), author
- Sonja Molnar (b. 1990), former professional tennis player
- Christopher Moloney (b. 1977), writer and photographer, known for FILMography rephotography
- Sean Monahan (b. 1994), NHL hockey player
- Moneen, band with members from Brampton
- Brian Morenz (b. 1949), retired WHA ice hockey centre
- Jim Moss (b. 1977), lacrosse player
- Alyscha Mottershead (b. 1991), former Canadian national soccer player
- Sophia Mustafa (1922–2005), writer, politician, the first non-white female member of a legislature in Africa

== N ==
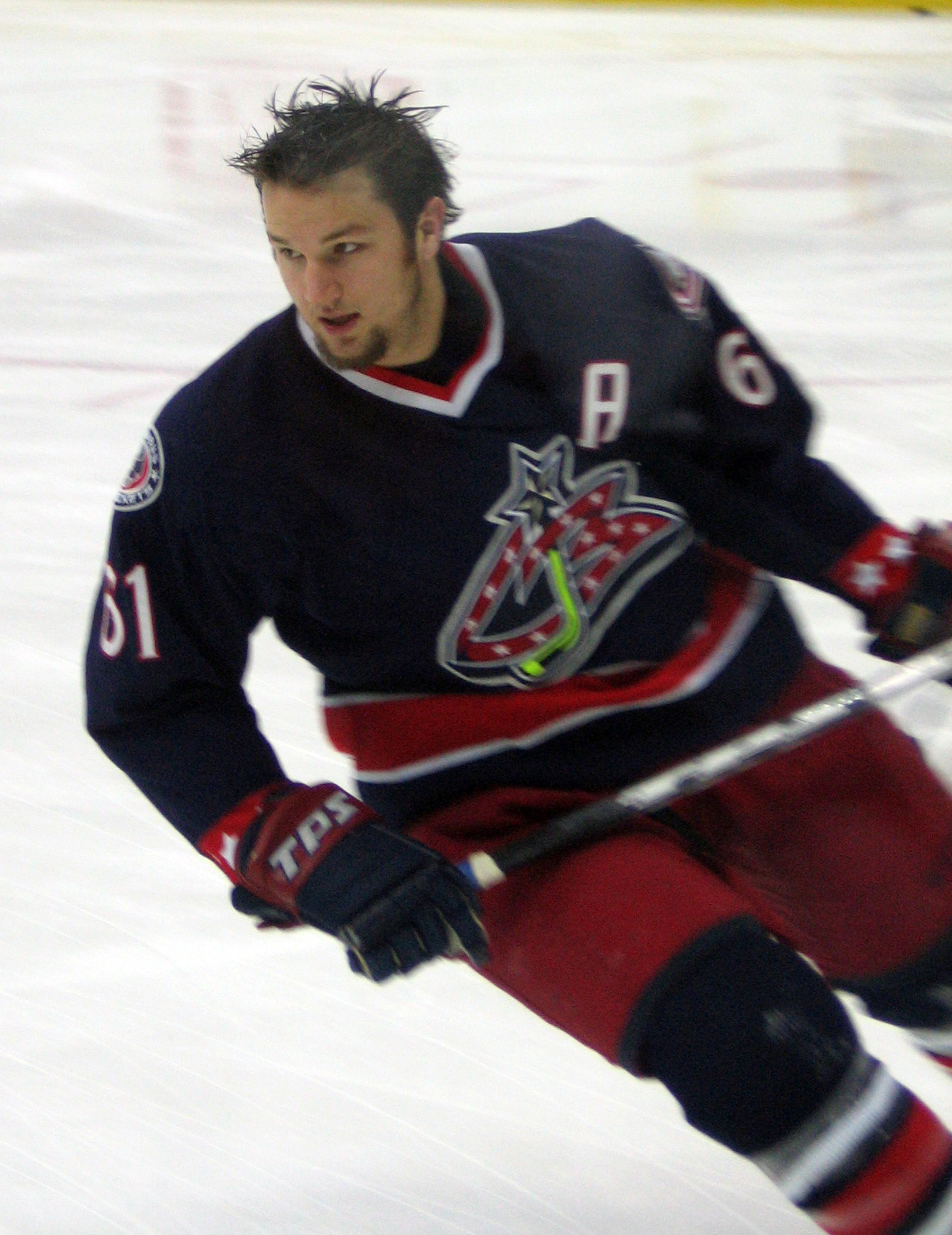
Rick Nash in 2006, playing for the Columbus Blue Jackets

- Rick Nash (b. 1984), hockey player
- Zarqa Nawaz (b. 1968), writer, journalist, filmmaker, creator of Little Mosque on the Prairie
- Jayden Nelson (b. 2002), professional soccer player forward
- Christabel Nettey (b. 1991), Olympic long jump athlete
- Neville-Lake children (d. 2015), died of blunt trauma in a traffic collision, receiving extensive national coverage
- Kris Newbury (b. 1982), hockey player
- Jabs Newby (b. 1991), basketball player, NBLC
- Alfred Westland Nixon (1863–1921), MPP, Halton (1905–1919), educated at Brampton and in Toronto
- Tobias C. Norris (1861–1936), former Manitoba premier
- Jeffrey Northrup (1966–2021), Toronto police officer accidentally killed in line of duty
- NorthSideBenji (b. Jaiden Anthony Watson), rapper
- Jason Nugent (b. 1982), former CFL football player
- Marcos Nunes (b. 1992), soccer player

== O ==
- Brenna O'Brien (b. 1991), voice actor
- Christabel Oduro (b. 1992), soccer player, Canada women's national soccer team
- sean o huigin (b. 1942, John Higgins), poet and writer
- Frank Oliver (1853–1933), politician and journalist, MLA, MP, Laurier's Minister of the Interior
- Joseph Onabolu (b. 1994), pop singer
- Godfrey Onyeka (b. 1994), CFL defensive back football player
- Kene Onyeka (b. 1996), CFL defensive lineman football player
- Kosi Onyeka (b. 1999), CFL defensive back football player
- Nakas Onyeka (b. 1994), former CFL linebacker football player
- Tara Oram (b. 1984), country music recording artist
- Chika Stacy Oriuwa, physician, spoken word artist
- Chris Osei-Kusi (b. 1997), CFL football player
- Anthony Osorio (b. 1994), soccer player, born in Toronto and raised in Brampton
- Jonathan Osorio (b. 1998), soccer player

== P ==
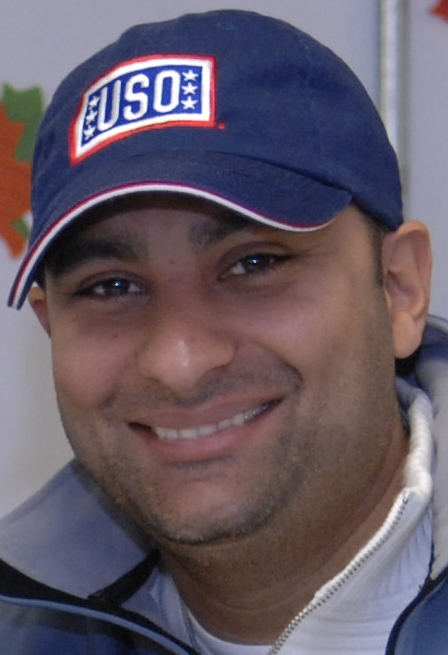
Russell Peters

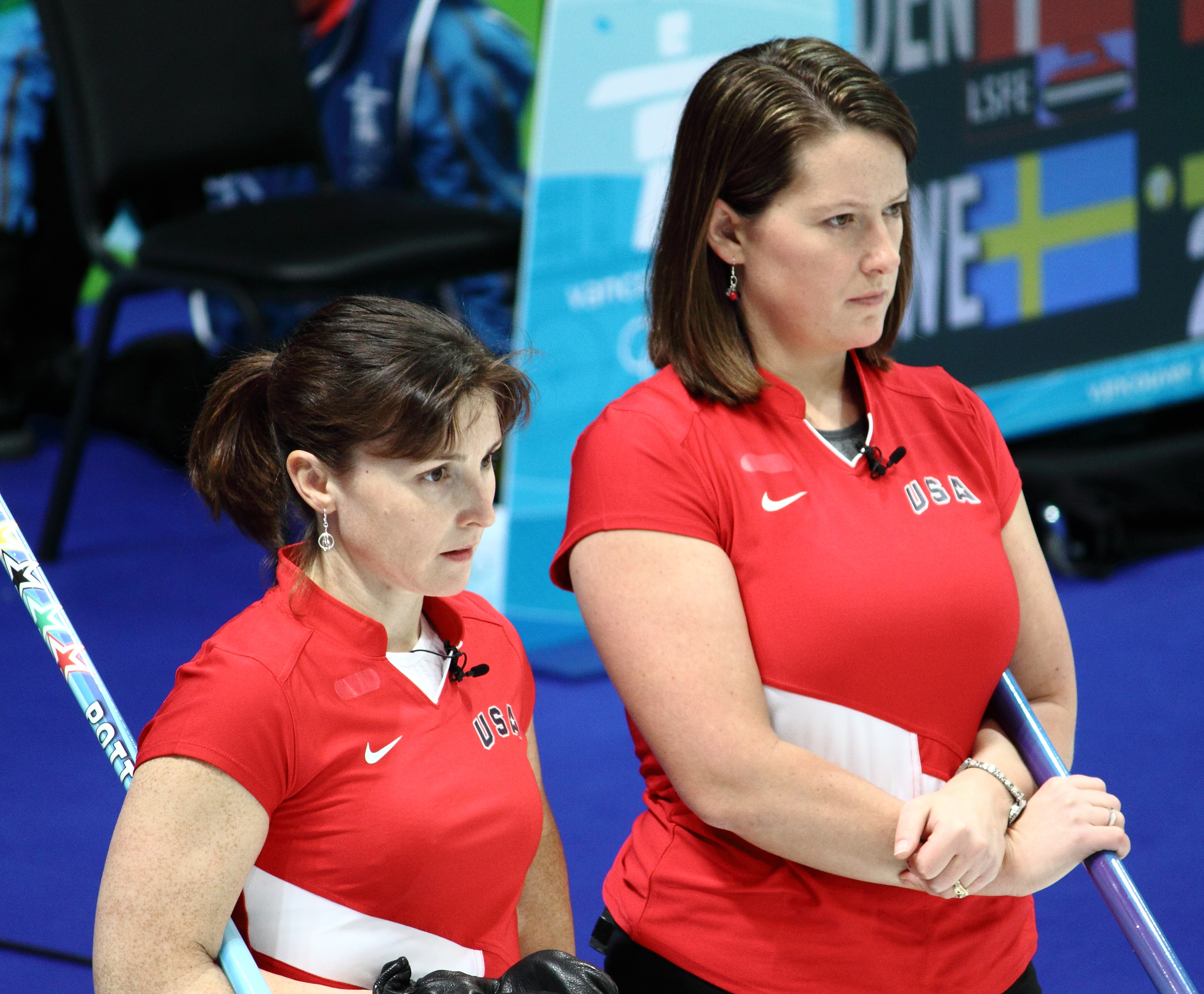
Allison Pottinger (left)

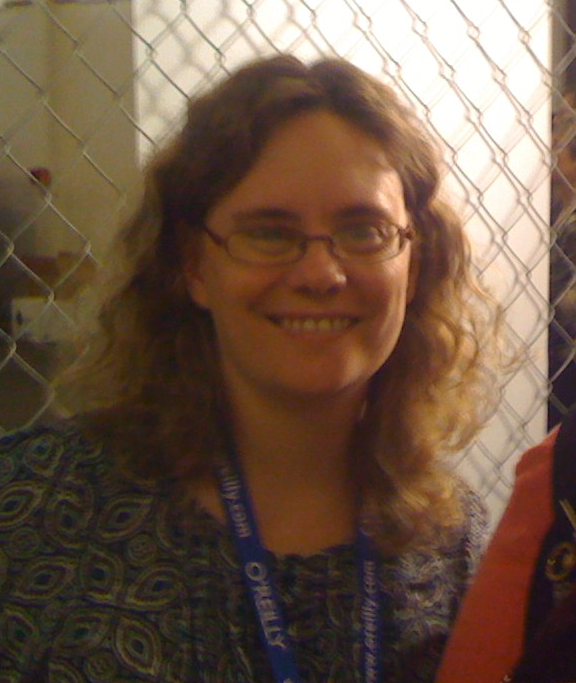
Stephanie Pearl-McPhee
- Soni Pabla (1976–2006), musician
- Josh Palmer, NFL-signed football wide receiver
- Suzan Palumbo, speculative fiction writer and editor
- Dr. Caroline Park, physician, former Korean Olympic hockey player, former child actress
- Tracy Parsons, second leader of the Progressive Canadian Party
- Slava Pastuk, operated a drug dispensary in Montreal, and put on house arrest in Brampton
- Howard Pawley OC (1934–2015), former Manitoba premier
- Stephanie Pearl-McPhee (b. 1968), author and knitter,
- Derek Perera (b. 1977), former Canada national cricket team player
- Kayla Perrin (b. c. 1970), author
- Russell Peters (b. 1970), stand-up comedian who was raised in town, and later moved back
- Kyle Pettey, Paralympic shot putter
- Reshon Phillip (b. 1998), soccer player
- David Phillips (b. 1978), actor, Shark City, Eat Wheaties!
- Kwasi Poku (b. 2003), soccer player
- John Pomorski (1905–1977), MLB baseball pitcher, died in Brampton
- Zach Pop (b. 1996), MLB baseball player
- Allison Pottinger (b. 1973), curler
- Gerry Powers, ice hockey goalie
- Gaylord Powless (1946–2001), lacrosse player
- Martin Prashad (1959–2000), Guyanese-Canadian cricketer for Canada (1983–1996)
- Norman Mills Price (1877–1951), illustrator

== Q ==
- Len Quesnelle (b. 1966), ice hockey coach, former player

== R ==
- Navid Rahman (b. 1996), Canadian-Pakistani footballer
- Jasvir Rakkar (b. 1991), retired Chicago Cubs pitcher, Canada national team gold medalist
- Leah-Marie Ramalho (b. 1992), footballer, Guyana women's national team
- Brittany Raymond (b. 1995), actor, The Next Step
- Adonijah Reid (b. 1999), soccer player
- Alyssa Reid (b. 1993), singer, 2012 Juno Award nominee
- Jack Reid (1924–2009), watercolourist
- Johnny Reid (b. 1973), singer
- Sam Reid (b. 1963), keyboardist, Glass Tiger
- Kyle Reyes (b. 1993), Olympic judoka, born in Brampton and raised in Toronto
- Jessie Reyez (b. 1991), singer-songwriter
- Donn Reynolds (1921–1997), country music singer, Canada's "King of the Yodelers"
- Simon Reynolds (b. 1963), actor
- Rob Ricci (b. 1984), international hockey player
- Friendly Rich (Richard Marsella), avant-garde composer/musician
- Tyrell Richards (b. 1998), CFL football player
- Jael Richardson, author, broadcaster, literary convention organizer
- Calum Ritchie (b. 2005), ice hockey player, OHL, drafted to NHL
- Quillan Roberts (b. 1994), soccer player on loan to Toronto FC
- George R. Robertson (1933–2023), Gemini Award-winning actor, Police Academy
- Peter Robertson (1938–2025), former mayor of Brampton
- Greg Roe (b. 1990), trampolinist
- Paul Roe (1959–2019), soccer player
- Peter Roe (b. 1955), ASL, MISL soccer
- William Francis Romain (1818 – after 1869), first postmaster of Brampton, 2nd mayor of Oakville
- William Ronald (1926–1998), abstract artist
- Kyle Rubisch (b. 1988), NLL/MLL lacrosse player

== S ==
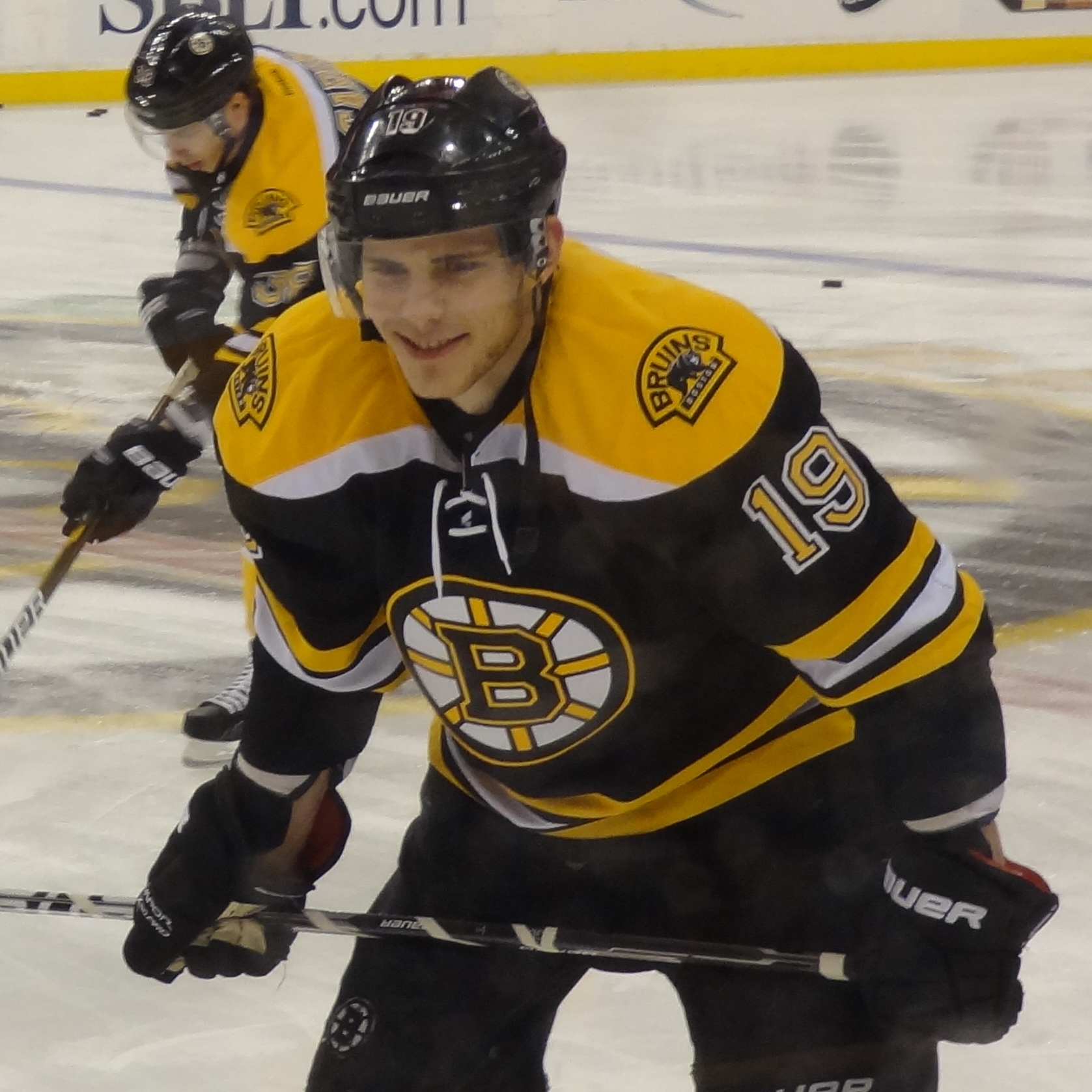
Tyler Seguin

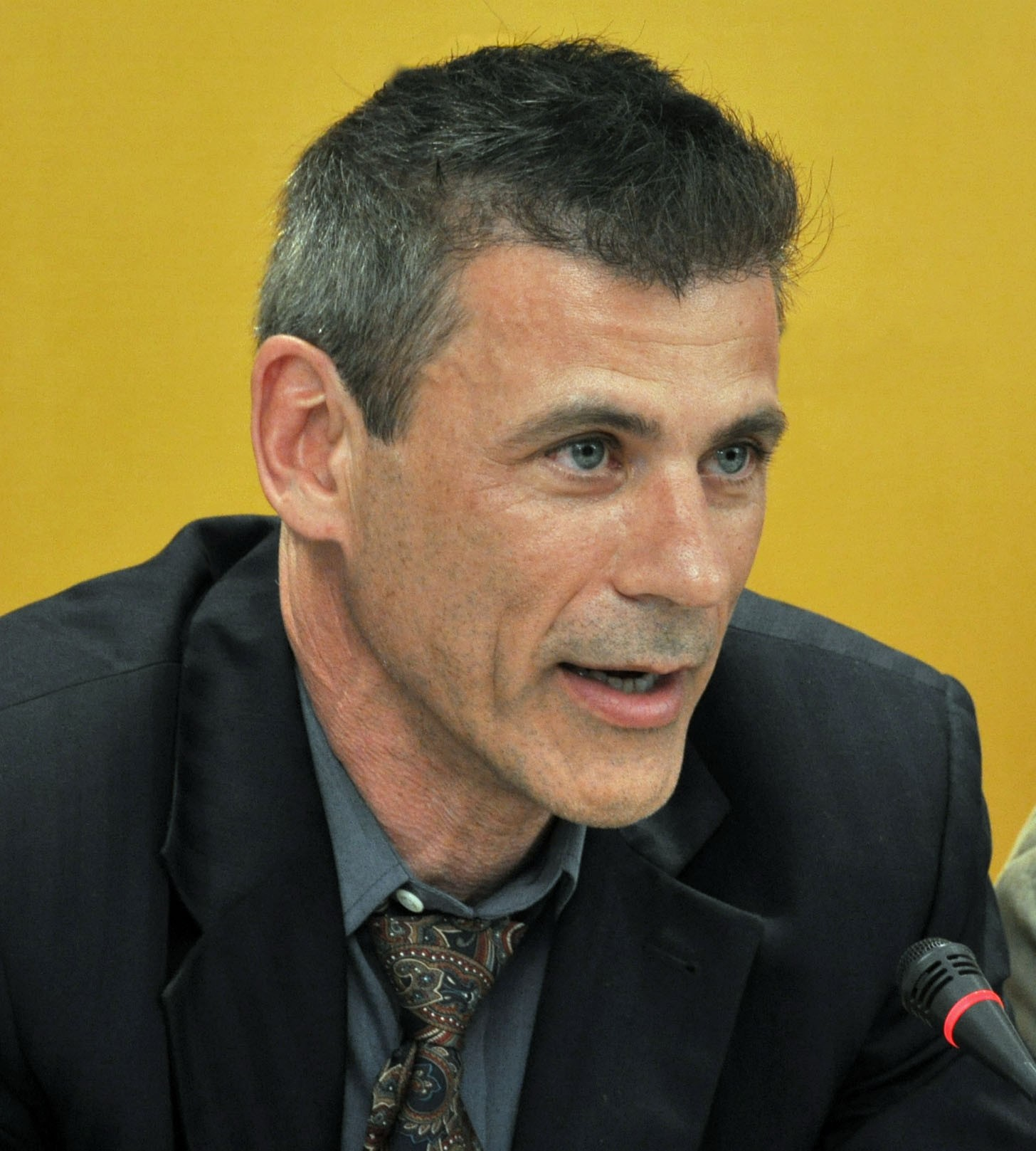
Rob Stewart

- Ruby Sahota, MP for Brampton North
- Anne Samplonius, retired road cyclist
- Daniel Sandate, United States Army deserter, second known U.S. soldier to be deported from Canada
- Maninder Sidhu, MP for Brampton East
- Ramesh Sangha (b. 1945), MP for Brampton Centre
- David Lynch Scott (1845–1924), Regina mayor
- Kyle Seeback (b. 1970), politician
- Tyler Seguin (b. 1992), hockey player
- Joseph Shabason, multi-instrumentalist and composer
- Gordon Shadrach, artist and educator
- Jeff Shattler (b. 1984), lacrosse player
- Tiffany Shaw, geophysical scientist
- Shubh (b. 1998, Shubhneet Singh), singer and rapper
- Bob Sicinski (b. 1946), former WHA ice hockey player
- Maninder Sidhu (b. 1984), MP for Brampton East
- Sonia Sidhu, MP for Brampton South
- Christine E. Silverberg (b. 1949, née Bertram), lawyer, first female chief of the Calgary Police Service (1995–2000)
- Jagmeet Singh (b. 1979), politician, MPP for Bramalea—Gore—Malton 2011–2017, federal leader of the New Democratic Party 2017–2025
- Luke Singh (b. 2000), MLS soccer player, Trinidad and Tobago national team
- Yuvraj Singh Samra (born 2006), international cricketer
- Jarryn Skeete (b. 1993), NBLC basketball player
- Gavin Smellie (b. 1986), track and field
- Blair Smith (b. 1990), CFL linebacker
- Cecil Smith (1936–2016), track and field coach, publisher
- C. J. Smith (b. 1998), League1 Ontario soccer player
- Robbie Smith (b. 1997), Canadian football defensive lineman
- Daniel Sparre (b. 1984), international hockey player
- Matthew Srbely (b. 1998), League of Ireland soccer player
- Paul Stalteri (b. 1977), soccer
- Steve Stanton (b. 1956), science fiction author
- Courtney Stephen (b. 1989), former CFL player
- Jay Stephens (b. 1971), cartoonist, creator of Tutenstein and The Secret Saturdays
- John Smith Stewart (1878–1970), Alberta MLA, brigadier-general, dentist
- Rob Stewart (b. 1961), actor, Tropical Heat
- Kevin Stittle (b. 1979), Olympic sailing
- Justin Stoddart (b. 1995), soccer player
- Robert J. Stone (1944–2009), Canadian music entrepreneur
- Jamie Storr (b. 1975), hockey player
- Melique Straker (b. 2000), CFL linebacker
- Peter Sturgeon (b. 1954), former NHL hockey player

== T ==
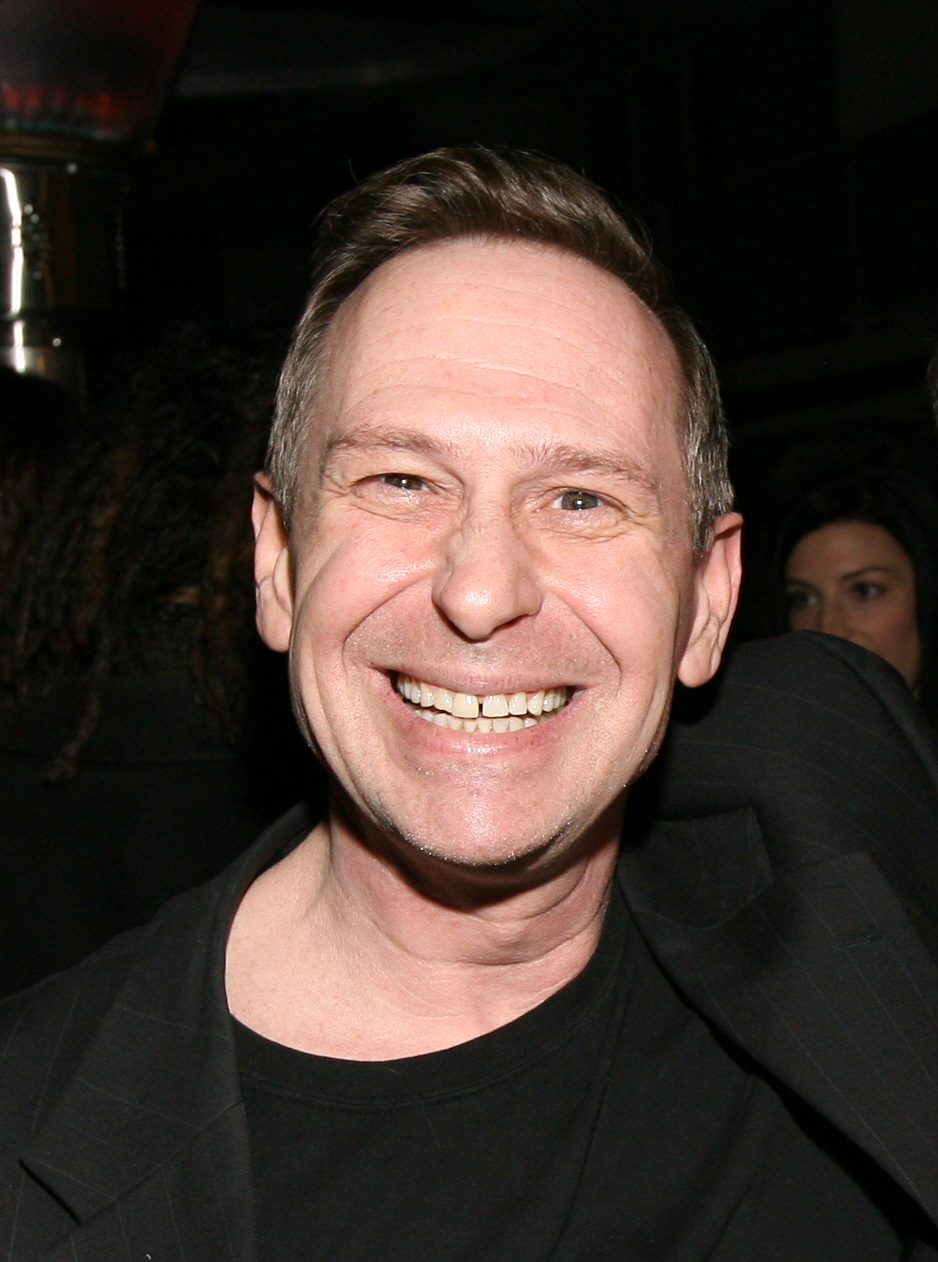
Scott Thompson

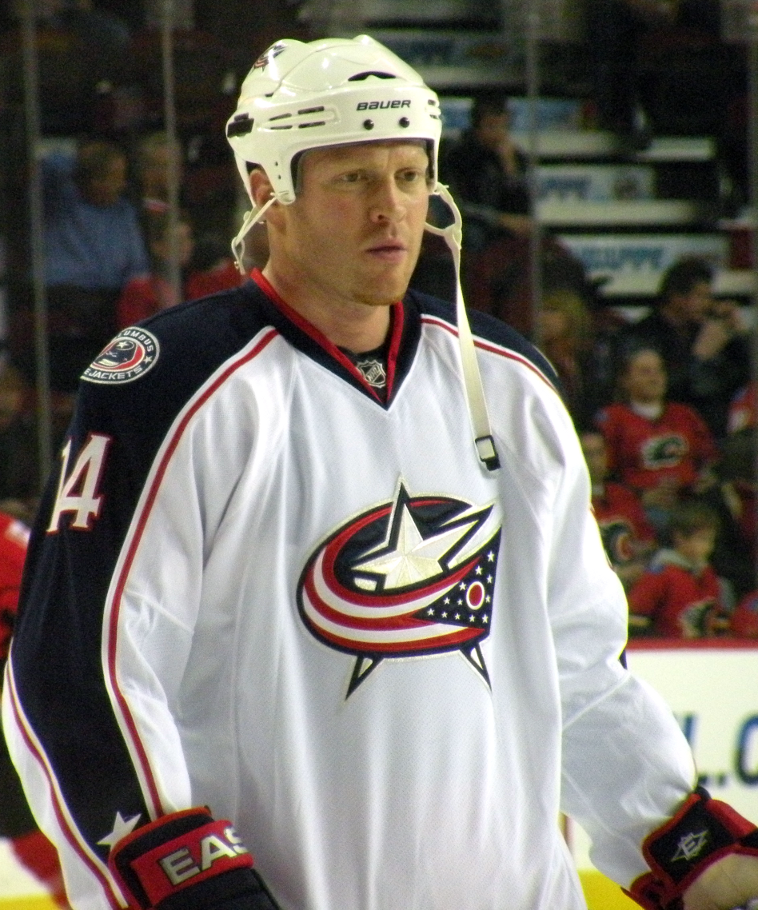
Raffi Torres

- Alisha Tatham (b. 1986), basketball player
- Patrick Tatham, basketball coach and former basketball player
- Tamara Tatham (b. 1985), basketball player
- Kevaughn Tavernier (b. 2006), CPL soccer player
- Robbie Taylor (b. 1981), swimmer
- Dan Teat (b. 1971), former Canadian lacrosse player
- Nancy Telfer (b. 1950), Canadian choral conductor, music educator and composer
- Chris Terry (b. 1989), NHL hockey player
- Alan Thicke (1947–2016), actor, briefly lived in Brampton
- Jesse Thistle, Canadian Métis-Cree PhD student working on theories of intergenerational and historic trauma of the Métis people
- Dave Thomas (b. 1976), basketball player
- John Thomas (b. 1960), Olympic dance mixed figure skater
- Kadell Thomas (b. 1996), soccer
- Roger Thompson (b. 1991), soccer player, Brampton-raised
- Scott Thompson (b. 1959), one of the first openly gay television personalities in Canada, part of The Kids in the Hall comedy troupe
- Tristan Thompson (b. 1991), basketball player
- Robert Tiller (b. 1949), Thoroughbred horse trainer and owner, Canadian Horse Racing Hall of Fame
- Tobi (b. Oluwatobi Ajibolade), rapper and singer
- Töme (b. 1997, Michelle Oluwatomi Akanbi), singer, songwriter, actor
- Raffi Torres (b. 1981), hockey player
- Sunny Tripathy (b. 1989), actor, comedian, writer
- The Honorable Justice Michael H. Tulloch, Ontario Superior Court
- Steven Turner (b. 1987), former CFL football player

== V ==
- Edo Van Belkom (b. 1962), horror author
- Kate Van Buskirk (b. 1987), retired middle distance runner, Olympian, Commonwealth Games medalist
- Daryl Veltman (b. 1985), NLL lacrosse player
- Jim Veltman (b. 1966), NLL lacrosse player
- Nick Volpe (1926–2021), CFL football player
- Kevin Vuong (b. c. 1989), member of Parliament for Spadina—Fort York, Royal Canadian Navy reserve public affairs officer

== W ==
- Reshaun Walkes (b. 1999), League1 Ontario soccer player
- Warren Ward (b. 1962), basketball player
- Mike Weaver (b. 1978), retired hockey player
- Scott Wedgewood (b. 1992), NHL goalie
- Jabar Westerman (b. 1989), CFL draftee
- Jamaal Westerman (b. 1985), NFL football player
- Ken Whillans (1927–1990), mayor of Brampton
- Catherine White (b. 1990), hockey player
- Charmaine Williams, politician
- Ian Williams, Giller Prize-winning author
- Leighton Alexander Williams, actor and playwright
- Sir Robert S. C. Williams, founder of St. Leonard's Place
- Shomari Williams (b. 1985), CFL football player
- Curtis Williamson (1867–1944), artist known as the "Canadian Rembrandt"
- Emma-Jayne Wilson (b. 1981), horse racing
- JoAnn Wilson (1939–1983), ex-wife and later murder victim of MLA Colin Thatcher
- Mike Wilson (b. 1975), hockey player
- Murphy Wiredu (b. 1985), soccer
- WondaGurl, musician
- Roy Wood$ (b. 1996, Denzel Spencer), rapper and R&B musician
- Supinder Wraich (b. 1993), actress and television creator
- Lowell Wright (b. 2003), soccer player

== Y ==
- James Yurichuk (b. 1986), CFL football player

== Z ==
- Saad Bin Zafar (b.1986), cricket player
- Tomislav Zanoški (b. 1984), hockey player
- Edmund Zavitz (1875–1968), the "father of reforestation in Ontario"

== Canadian honours system recipients ==
William G. Davis and Michael F. Clarke have both received the Order of Canada. Davis is the only Bramptonian to receive an Order of Ontario. There are 1253 Brampton residents to receive Exemplary Service Medals. The Golden Jubilee Award was given to 168 in 2002.

- Caring Canadian Award: Adriana J. Pouw
- Decorations for Bravery: Glenn Bannerman-Maxwell, Robert Reginald Fraser, Maribel Garcia, Susan Elizabeth McHale, Mandeep Singh Dhillon, Thomas Tierney, J. Robert Walsh, and David Ware
- Constable David Henry Bowles, M.B., Medal of Bravery recipient
- David Alan Holwell, Medal of Bravery recipient
- Sergeant (Ret'd) Joseph Gabriel Simon Marion, M.S.M., Meritorious Service Medal (civil division) recipient

== See also ==
- List of people from Mississauga
- List of people from Caledon
