= Gani Odutokun =

Nigerian painter (1946–1995)

- Born: 9 August 1946; Ghana
- Died: 15 February 1995 (aged 48) in
- Education: Ahmadu Bello University
- Known for: Painting, colorist
- Notable work: Dialogue with Mona Lisa, The King Shares a Joke with His General
- Movement: Zaria Art School

Gani Odutokun (9 August 1946 – 15 February 1995) was a contemporary Nigerian painter who is known for his contributions and nurturing of artists in the Zaria Art Society. His works include wall murals, paintings and book cover designs.

== Early life and education ==
Odutokun was born in Nsawam, Ghana, to Nigerian parents of Yoruba ethnicity who were originally from Offa, Kwara State, and who were in the cocoa trade. He spent his early childhood growing up in Ashanti region but his father later relocated to Nigeria after a slump in the Cocoa trade. After secondary school, he worked as a clerk with Nigerian Breweries but with prodding from friends who saw his talent, he applied and got admission to Ahmadu Bello University (ABU), Zaria, in 1972. He graduated from the college with a bachelor's and master's degree in fine arts in 1975 and 1979. After obtaining his bachelor's degree, he joined the Fine Arts department of ABU as a graduate assistant.

== Career ==
Odutokun's artworks are known for exploring the nature of life. His paintings tend to explore philosophical concepts about "accident and design". His solo exhibitions include Fragments and The Seemingly Unbalanced Equilibrium, Some of his works also try to challenge Western expectations of African Art. At times, Odutokun included political commentary in his works. The 1988 painting "The King Shares a Joke with his General" alludes to the pretentious ideals of liberalism of Babangida.

== Death ==
Odutokun died while returning from an exhibition that followed a workshop held at the Goethe Institute in Lagos. He was among four artists who died in a vehicular accident. In February 1995, Time No Boundaries, an exhibition featuring paintings from dozens of artists from the Northern Nigeria region, was held at the Maison de France, Alfred Rewane road, in Odutokun's honour. In 2008, a memorial art exhibition by the Nigerian Gallery of Art in honour of Odutokun's paintings was held at the Aina Onabolu complex of the National Arts Theatre, Iganmu, Lagos. Following his death, he was inducted into the Hall of Fame of the Society of Nigerian Artists.
