= Aina Onabolu =

Nigerian artist (1882–1963)

- Born: 1882; Ijebu-Ode
- Died: 1963 (aged 80–81)
- Known for: Portraiture
- Notable work: Portrait of Lady Spencer Savage
- Movement: Modern African Art
- Patrons: Dr. Randle, Lagos Town Council,

Chief Aina Onabolu OBE (1882 – 1963) was a pioneering Nigerian modern arts teacher and painter who was an important figure in the introduction of arts into the curriculum of secondary schools in the country. He promoted the drawing of environmental forms in a verisimilitudinous style and was known for his early modern work in portraiture. Aina is the great-grandfather of Canadian pop singer Joseph Onabolu.

== Early life and education ==
Aina Onabolu was born in Ijebu-Ode in 1882. His father was a successful merchant and his mother was also a trader. He started painting at the early age of 12, inspired by the cheap re-produced illustrations of Western arts which were prominent in many Nigerian magazines and religious books. By the age of 32, he was able to exhibit his own works and was quite popular as a knowledgeable and skilled artist. He later traveled abroad to study art at Académie Julian in Paris and at a school in London; before his sojourn abroad, he was already a competent and self-taught draftsman. He completed his studies with a diploma in fine arts and a teacher's certificate from St. John Woods College, London in 1922. He was known for his famous painting of Spencer Savage. He was the first person to teach art into secondary schools.

== Career ==
In 1909, when the colonial government in Nigeria took control of formal education, the curriculum in the schools was geared towards the provision of suitable education to train clerk position clerks for the colonial Administration government administration. Little was thought of arts education in secondary education until a report recommended the teaching of native indigenous handcraft. Prior to the report, Aina had formally presented requests for the introduction of modern arts education in secondary schools but his option was rejected by the colonial education officers. During the time, there were implicit suggestions by the colonial officers that the natural limits of Africans was in pottery and craft. Aina's return from St John Woods, London, in 1922 and Julians Academy in Paris and his acquired knowledge of the European technique of painting, anatomy and the characteristics of European art education coincided with a new perspective on introducing indigenous art education in the country. Aina, who had taught informally to enthusiastic students began teaching in a few top schools in Lagos such as King's College, Lagos and CMS Grammar School, Lagos. His themes dealt primarily with the science of perspective, drawing, human proportions, and watercolor painting. Though there were few teachers on western techniques in art, Aina's period started the separation of art and life.

Aina also encouraged the adoption of European teachers in art instruction in the country. His effort led to the hiring of a foreign art teacher named Kenneth C. Murray. Murray led a gradual re-awakening of traditional handicraft and arts. The new approach of promoting indigenous African arts and staying within the native repository of knowledge in traditional African arts was introduced into the curriculum of various secondary schools in the country. The efforts of the new instructor yielded early dividends, as the number of Nigerian art instructors increased and knowledge of traditional works such as the Uli body and wall became more pronounced. However, Murray's effort meant little in the long run as the country was in the midst of a colonial and Western government which introduced its own way or life, leading to a gradual shift in the society from traditional to a Western culture.

== Works ==
Onabolu's major artworks were portraits. His portrait of Mrs. Spencer Savage in 1906 is sometimes credited as one of the earliest outstanding works of art in Nigeria that used a western and modern style and technique. Another major work of his was the portrait of Dr. Randle, a Nigerian political figure of the era. The latter was his mentor, and was the person who got his attention onto the deleterious characteristics of colonialism which were exemplified by a segregationist governor in the person of Walter Egerton. He also made a portrait of the medical pioneer Chief (Dr.) Sapara, which was in watercolor

Several of his portraits are held in the National Gallery of Modern Art, Lagos. His portrait of the aristocratic socialite Princess Obasa was part of the Nigerian Modernism exhibition at Tate Modern in London, Great Britain, in 2025.

The major figures in his work were Lagos elites who were successful professionals in their field of work, and his work usually depicted a countenance of respect, achievement and status of his clients. However, his work was not limited to portraiture. In the 1930s, he worked with the Church of Christ in designing the pews of a new cathedral to be built in Lagos. He later produced pastel compositions and studies in the 1940s.
