= National Gallery of Modern Art, Lagos =

Art museum in Lagos, Nigeria

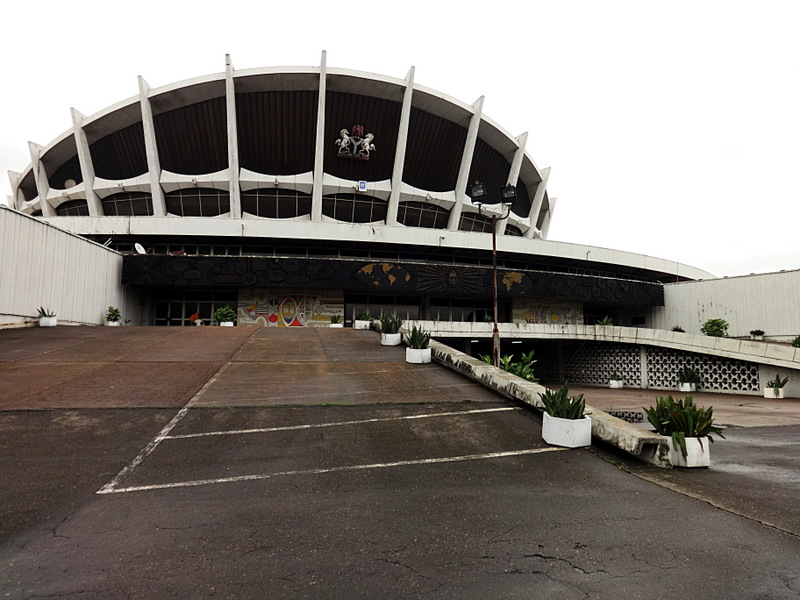
- Location: Lagos, Nigeria
- Coordinates: 6.476456°N 3.369343°E
- Type: Art Museum

The National Gallery of Modern Art, Lagos (NGMA) is a major art gallery in Lagos, the largest city of Nigeria. It is a permanent exhibition of the National Gallery of Art, a parastatal of the Federal Ministry of Tourism, Culture and National Orientation. The gallery is located within the National Arts Theatre, at Entrance B.

== Location ==
The National Gallery of Modern Art is located on two floors below the huge auditorium of the National Arts Theatre. The upper level features a showcase of contemporary art, including colourful abstract canvases by Bruce Onobrakpeya and bronze busts by Ben Osawe. There is also a bookshop and library.

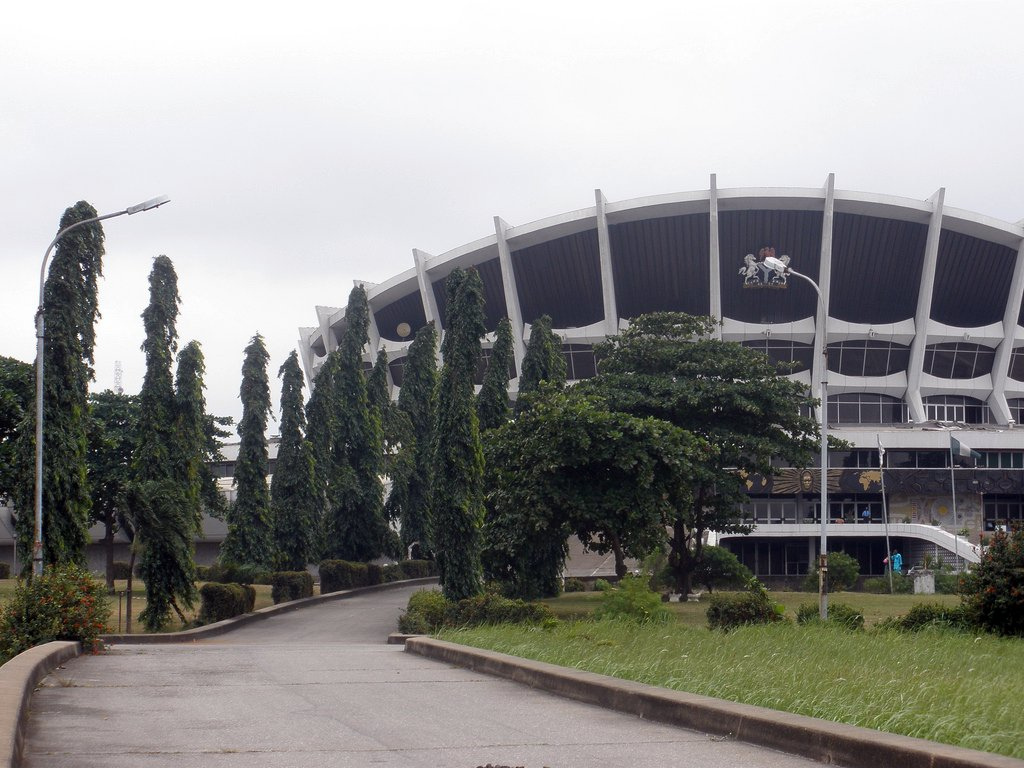
The National Gallery of Modern Art, Lagos

== Exhibits ==
The Portrait Gallery section includes both modern and earlier portraits of prominent, including all Heads of State. It includes portraits of artists such as Aina Onabolu, Chief Hubert Ogunde, Chinua Achebe, Wole Soyinka and Professor Ben Enwonwu. The section holding the works of the masters and other Nigerian artists includes work by Akinola Lasekan, Erhabor Emokpae, Professor Solomon Wangboje, Bruce Onobrakpeya, Haig David West and Gani Odutokun.

The modern sculpture section presents recent Nigerian sculpture, showing continuity with earlier forms such as the Nok culture but now no longer ritual and mystical in character. Other sections are devoted to ceramics, artwork from friendly nations, a comparison of media and styles, glass painting and textiles. Modern textile art in Nigeria draws on rich traditions from the Yoruba, Hausa, Igbo, Edo and other peoples of Nigeria. Even modern textile art may draw heavily on folklore and use traditional symbols, colours and patterns.

== See also ==
- Virtual Museum of Modern Nigerian Art
