= Greg Roe =

Gregory Vladimir Roe (born May 17, 1990) is widely credited as the developer of Freestyle Trampoline, a new branch of acrobatics in which the athletes take a leading role in their training and competitive structure compared to the coaching-centred approach that has traditionally been the prevailing narrative in acrobatics for its entire history. Roe is a Canadian entrepreneur, biomechanics coach, social media Influencer and former athlete who has won several national gold medals in the gymnastics and trampoline disciplines. He is well known in the acrobatic industry for his skills and stunts on social media. He has appeared on numerous television shows including America's Got Talent (2015), Discovery Channel, Daily Planet, and Das Supertalent (Germany), showcasing his acrobatic talents. He currently is co-founder of the Freestyle Trampoline Association and works on many acrobatic based projects around the world.

== Early life ==
Vladimir Demidov was born on May 17, 1990, in Moscow, Soviet Union. Roe spent the first five years of his life in a Russian orphanage until he was adopted by a Canadian family. Maureen and Randy Roe, from Brampton, Ontario, Canada, welcomed Roe into their home along with their son, Douglas. Roe embraced his new Canadian culture but would keep his Russian name as a middle name, becoming Gregory Vladimir Roe.

The orphanage had lasting effects on Roe's mentality and how he viewed the world. He was regularly disciplined at school and got into physical altercations often. Diagnosed with ADHD, Roe found it hard to focus on one thing and was kicked out of his first gymnastics class by Alex Bard, former Gymnastics Women's National coach, and was told he would never make it in the Industry. However, Roe would learn to use sport and his creativity to his advantage for what would become his future lifelong passion.

== Education ==
Roe found his calling in college in the fitness industry. He attended Humber College (North Campus) in Etobicoke, Toronto from 2009 to 2010. Roe then applied to University of Guelph-Humber’s Kinesiology program (2011–2013) to obtain his bachelor's degree. His trampoline career was taking off at the same time and he was named to Team Canada in 2010.

During his last year at university, Roe interned at the Canadian Sport Centre Ontario (CSCO) where he would test Olympic athletes from across Canada. He later worked at CSCO as a fitness tester and worked with different teams on a contract basis.

Along with his Kinesiology background, Roe is certified by the National Canadian Coaching Program for Level 2 Gymnastics, Level 3 Trampoline Coach, Olympic Weightlifting, and International Society for the Advancement of Anthropometry Level 1. Greg is also CanFit Pro Certified and has a valid Cardiopulmonary resuscitation|CPR and Risk management Certification.

By far, Roe's experience traveling has given him insights into different cultures' views on the sport that has shown to be a crucial element in the educational process. He takes these experiences and utilizes them to be able to see from many different points of view which is crucial in coaching any athlete.

== Career ==
=== Gymnastics ===
His second gym, after the incident with the former head coach, Gymnastics Giants, closed when Roe was 11 years old and he moved to Bramalea Gymnastics under head coaches Doron Kernerman and Titus Ruddock. Roe was eventually awarded the top male athlete at Brampton Gymnastics and began winning medals at competitions once he began to focus more on his training.

Brampton Gymnastics eventually closed due to lack of funding and Greg was forced to move to another gym. This time when he went back to Gymnastics Mississauga with Alex Bard and this time he was accepted because he was now highly focused. Roe then began working with Men's coaches Chris Foo and Gary Isaacs. He won a gold medal at the Canadian Nationals on the Parallel bars in 2007 in Level 6 Open National Level.

Roe began training for Junior and senior National competitions but decided the strict environment did not give him the freedom to train the way he wanted. He then made the decision to move out of the gymnastics program and into trampoline in 2008. From there he began competing in trampoline full-time and quickly excelled with his gymnastics background.

=== Trampoline ===
After leaving gymnastics in 2008, Roe quickly adapted to the sport of trampoline. During his gymnastics career he had attended SkyRiders Trampoline facility in Richmond Hill Ontario, just north of Toronto. He trained only once a week as a recreational athlete to complement his gymnastics training.

Once Roe began to compete in trampoline, he quickly moved through the levels, winning Canadian Nationals in his first year at the Junior National Level. He earned his way onto Team Canada, head coached by Olympic coach Dave Ross only two years later and was consistently placing top four nationally. In 2010 he began to compete internationally, representing Canada at several World Cup competitions.

He was named Senior National Synchronized Champion along with teammate, Sebastien St-Germain in 2013. He also received a Highest Difficulty Award at the Aalsmeer Flower Cup in The Netherlands in March 2011.

Though Roe was quickly proving he could be a strong contender on the world stage, teammates and coaches note that "Greg never really liked to compete, he just put up with it so he could bounce on the supertramp." Roe's true passion was inventing new skills and experimenting with new skills and coaching philosophies that were highly outside the norm and often looked down upon by his teammates, coaches and the wider industry. Roe, having an independent attitude from birth, saw no real issues with these struggles but eventually, his independent attitude mixed with his natural aggression caused him to get into political conflicts with his federation.

Around this time in 2013–2014, Roe was officially kicked off of Team Canada because they felt he did not fit the culture of Team Canada. After receiving an official letter from Dave Ross, Roe looked at the situation as an opportunity to reinvent the sport in his own image and went on to create Freestyle Trampoline as a new community and sport.

=== Coaching ===
Roe began teaching at the age of 12 as a ‘Coach in Training’ (CIT) at Bramalea Gymnastics. He began to host coaching clinics and now trains athletes and other coaches around the world such as Cirque du Soleil performers, Lords of Gravity; a popular basketball dunk team in Hungary as well as many others. Roe is currently the head trampoline coach for Snowboard Germany's national Slopestyle and Half Pipe teams. He works with all three sectors of the industry; garden trampolines, trampoline parks and traditional trampoline. He also works with many industries outside of the acrobatic world and has created an Official Certification that allows all sports to benefit from trampoline training.

in 2018 Roe created the very first Indonesian Trampoline Team for the 2018 Asian Games in Jakarta. He continues to remotely train the team through online videos and webinars as they develop. He has worked with many of the Nitro Circus athletes who tour the world performing stunts, utilizing his 'out of the box' thinking to help with their extreme stunts, which is also his specialty.

Trampoline parks represent a relatively new sector within the global acrobatic industry. To promote safety and education, Roe has been collaborating with park owners and managers. While the industry has faced criticism regarding safety standards, Roe and his team have taken an active role, partnering with various brands and organizations to provide standardized training and educational resources.

His coaching philosophy is unique from other coaches in the industry. Traditional acrobatics is based on a linear 2-dimensional trial and error process guided by a coach. Roe believes that this creates athlete dependency and he has demonstrated that the athletes have very little ability to problem solve with novel situations with this top-down approach. Roe believes that by giving the athletes more control over their training with a no-hand spotting mentality, the athletes can learn to take control over their own training and thereby be more likely to properly self regulate in any situation whether a coach is present or not. He believes that as the industry expands into new markets of uneducated individuals performing acrobatics with no mandatory education, it is more important to train self-regulatory training plans.

Roe's unique 3-Dimensional model of developing acrobatics looks at acrobatics as a metaphorical 'map' that needs to be loaded and athletes can 'load' the different parts of the map by doing many different types of skills going through many different axes. For him, an athlete gains spatial awareness by going through the movements and building neuronal circuits corresponding to each skill. He imagines every known skill being simply a string of different degrees of rotation within the body joints and around the different axes of the body. He teaches athletes to be able to 'build' their skills like a tower in any way they wish in a controlled manner by simply stacking the different degrees upon each other in different orders.

In his book "Coaching Creatures – The Unsolved Circuits," he describes the science and practical experience behind this 'build up' approach. It builds confidence in the athletes and gives them complete control over their training whether they are inside a controlled gym or outside in a foreign environment.

This hands-off approach is popular with the new Freestyle Trampoline sector of the market which pride themselves in taking control over their own training, as Roe teaches them how to control their training on their own terms in a safe way. He has worked with many athletes, developing an official Research and Development business as part of his Global Holdings. This division is dedicated to further research in the areas of Athlete Development, Parental Development, Economics, Psychology and many others that aim to look at the acrobatic industry from a complete 3D model.

=== Business career ===
After leaving Team Canada Roe decided to study marketing and business development. Instead of going to school, he started traveling and gaining valuable practical experience by sitting down with many leaders in the industry as well as outside of it. He mixed his theoretical research education from University with his practical competitive experience and used business-minded individuals to help him learn how to package his unique coaching style and social media presence to be able to influence the industry on a global perspective.

In 2013 he partnered with Trish McGeer from inGear Productions and leading airbag manufacturer Bagjump Action Sports GmbH (Austria) and began a series of training clinics across Europe. He also performed at the Baltic Games in 2014 (Poland), Bravalla Festival(Sweden), on Das Supertalent (Germany) in 2014, and on America's Got Talent in 2015. He effectively became a social media influencer and was the first for his industry.

Greg used his influence to help brands reach their audience and to help spread education around the world to all three sectors of acrobatics and to other sports that utilize aerial movements such as Flyboarding and Wind Tunnel Flying. Greg lives on the road traveling meeting up with different members of his team to work on different projects.

Roe was the team lead on the first ever 3D Mobile Trampoline Simulator. The simulator has a free version, but also a Premium version, where Gamers can travel around the GRT Trampoline Park on their phones, bounce freely, train tricks and even compete with Live Leaderboards as well as IRL (In Real Life) events. Roe has launched a cryptocurrency coin and a whole marketplace of NFTs (non-fungible token) and plans on creating a Metaverse through the esports branch of his holdings. The simulator is always under development, but is available to play in all app stores.

In 2018 Roe officially turned all of his assets into a holding company called GRT Holdings, Inc. through his ecosystem of businesses and assets including stocks, cryptocurrency, real-estate, acrobatic equipment, equities as well as others. Throughout the Covid Pandemic, GRT Holdings, Inc. conducted over 10 Mergers and Acquisitions of other start up brands that allow Roe to adapt to the pandemic. GRT Holdings are estimated to be in the 3-5 Million dollar range and Roe has expressed interest in a Series A in 2023. Roe has many new ventures he dives into each year through his global B2B network and is remains open to new industries.

=== Freestyle Trampoline Association ===
In 2017 Greg and Trish created the first-ever official Freestyle Trampoline competition called the Garden Trampoline Games (GT Games). The event was a huge success with international media recognition and sparked the creation of Freestyle Trampoline as a new sport that was grown online according to the LA Times. Greg and Trish quickly created the Freestyle Trampoline Association (FTA) to govern these events worldwide and have operated for several years offering a new way to compete and train acrobatics for the new generation. The FTA has many partners around the world and has their own educational platform called the GRT Network and offer a certification for freestyle athletes and coaches to learn his 3-dimensional model of acrobatics. The FTA runs several series around the world for all different levels of athletes such as the Freestyle Trampoline World Championships for the top athletes and T.R.A.M.P Champ for the new athletes. The FTA is the first-ever association for these kinds of events and has been cited in media around the world for their innovation within a traditional industry.

== Media appearances ==
- Das Supertalent – 2014 Season 8, Episode 9
- Discovery Channel – 2014
- Daily Planet – December 2014
- America's Got Talent – 2015 – Season 10, Episode 6
- Ripley's Believe It Or Not – 2016
- Riding Zone – Freestyle Trampoline – 2019
- New York Times – Freestyle Trampoline – 2018
- LA Times – Freestyle Trampoline 2018
- Indonesian Trampoline Team 2018
