= Gordon Shadrach =

Anthony Gordon Shadrach is a Canadian artist and educator based in Toronto. Shadrach is known for exploring the semiotics of dress and its impact on culture, in particular the intersection and codification of race and fashion through his painting and textile based work. Born and raised in Brampton to Dominican and Trinidadian parents, Shadrach's work frequently engages themes of Blackness in Canada, the African Diaspora, and masculinity.

== Early life and education ==
Shadrach was born in Brampton, Ontario and was educated at OCAD University and Niagara University.

== Notable shows and exhibitions ==
Shadrach started painting casually in 2013 exploring different forms of figurative painting and portraiture. His early paintings did not include the faces of the sitters, enabling the viewer to interpret their race, gender, and sexuality through solely drawing on their own experiences and preconceptions. He initially exhibited his work through public spaces including cafes, public art fairs, and small group shows.

- Pride and Prejudice (2017) and Visceral (2018), Black Artists' Network and Dialogue, Toronto, Ontario
- Here We Are Here: Canadian Black Contemporary Art - Royal Ontario Museum 2018, Montreal 2018, and Halifax 2019
- Net Worth and Net Worth+ at United Contemporary Gallery, Toronto, Ontario 2020
- Trade at United Contemporary Gallery, Toronto, Ontario, 2021
- History is Rarely Black or White, Agnes Etherington Art Centre, Queens University, Kingston, Ontario, 2021/22 -External Links

== Notable collections ==
- Art Gallery of Hamilton
- The Wedge Collection
- The Tonya and Ato Wright Art Collection
