= Sunny Tripathy =

American actor

- Born: Suneet Tripathy; October 27, 1989 (age 36); Brampton, Canada
- Other name: Sunny T
- Education: University of California Los Angeles (BA)
- Occupations: Actor, Comedian, Writer, Producer
- Years active: 2008—present
- Height: 6 ft 0 in (183 cm)
- Website: www.sunnytripathy.com

Suneet "Sunny" Tripathy, also referred to as stage name 'Sunny T', is an Indian-American actor, comedian, writer, producer, Mr. India Global and a former model.

== Personal life ==
Suneet "Sunny Tripathy" was born on October 27, 1989, in Brampton, Canada to Indian immigrant parents. His passion for filmmaking began as a child, and he filmed various short films using a home camera.

In 2005, Sunny was the victim of a hate crime on the day of his prom, where he was attacked by neo-Nazi gang members outside of Stoneridge Mall in Pleasanton, California. The attack on the 16-year-old, which was thought to be racially inclined, took place in broad daylight and left the then Foothill High School student in the hospital with limited ability to walk. Tripathy suffered a shattered clavicle, a damaged back, broken nose, a fractured arm and multiple bruises and cuts.

Hoping to alleviate racial misunderstandings in his high school, Tripathy captained and choreographed a Bhangra dance performance at his high school's Multicultural Assembly. The dance was open to all ethnicities and included many of the school's popular athletes and cheerleaders. After graduating, Tripathy worked in UC Berkeley's biology department before transferring to UCLA where he got his bachelor's degree in 2012. Tripathy moved to Los Angeles full time and tried to pursue screenwriting and directing while working day jobs at Jamba Juice and a Yeshiva Gedolah.

He tried to find an agent and entered the Miss India America beauty pageant hoping to meet a judge that worked at CAA. Tripathy performed a fusion dance routine at the pageant and ended up winning Mr. Photogenic and Mr. India Global in 2012. He did not get signed to CAA for representation.

== Career ==
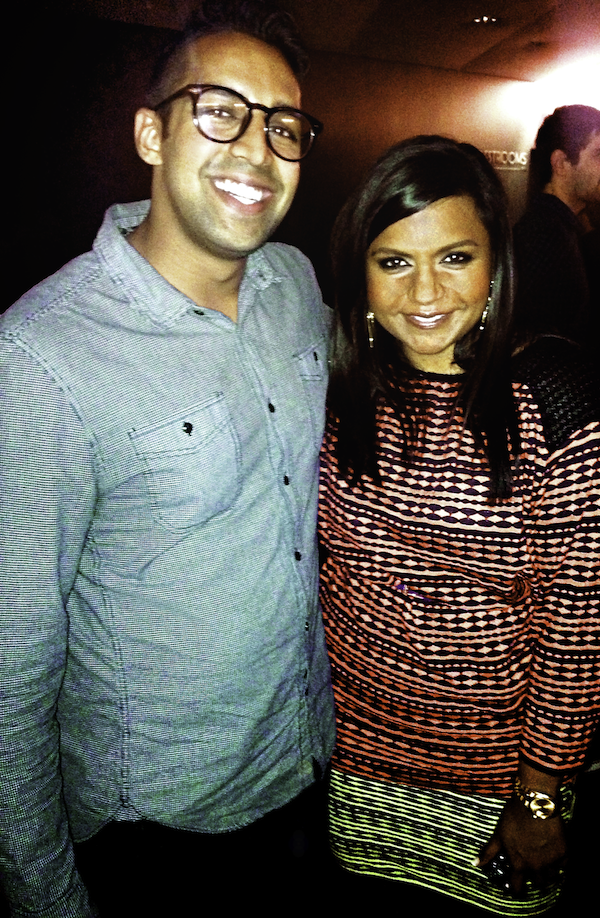
Sunny Tripathy & Mindy Kaling at Landmark Theater

Tripathy won the 1st season of Last Teen Comic Standing at the age of 17 and performed stand-up specials in Toronto, Los Angeles, San Francisco and Seattle. Tripathy is fluent in Odia, English, Hindi, and French, and many of his performances were in different languages. Tripathy used some of his material in a low-budget web-series called Keeping Up With the Guptas and convinced his parents and friends to star in it. The web-series went relatively viral, grew a cult following, and got Tripathy representation.

In December 2012, Tripathy was named among the Top 50 Coolest Desis In The World, sharing the list with Mindy Kaling, Priyanka Chopra, and Malala Yousafzai.

His new agents sent him on his first general meeting at 20th Century FOX in 2014 and Tripathy walked out with a blind script deal to write a show about his family. The FOX pilot did not move forward.

Tripathy went on to write and direct a webseries at NewForm Digital starring comedian Cody Ko. The pilot was part of the company's fifth incubator program and featured seven projects including one produced by Lisa Kudrow. Despite a good response to the pilot, NewForm closed before the pilot could go to series.

Tripathy then wrote a dance comedy feature based on his experiences and Ivan Reitman and Amie Karp at The Montecito Picture Company came on board to produce. The script sold to Tristar in a notable sale and is now in development.

Tripathy met with Will Arnett's Electric Ave and landed a deal to put together an original TV series with Sony Television. The collaborative project reportedly sold in the room at multiple networks and landed at Amazon after a highly-competitive bidding war.

In 2023, Tripathy was hired by Disney to write a live-action IP project with a producer from Lord of the Rings. The project's development was stopped during the 2023 WGA and SAG strikes.

In 2024, Tripathy was brought on to write a new animated feature based on a book that is in development at Dreamworks Animation. Plot details are under wraps but David Hoberman is attached as a producer.

In 2025, a Deadline Article announced that Tripathy was 1 of 15 fellows chosen for Dan Lin's Rideback Rise Fellowship. Tripathy is signed to UTA and 42 for representation.

== Entrepreneur ==
Tripathy is the COO and co-founder of Mamas, a CPG brand focused on a better- for-you butter alternative known as ghee.

He and his wife, Sonia Sandha, bootstrapped the business and started selling jars of ghee in Farmers' Markets across Los Angeles in 2023.

The brand was also chosen out of 5000 brands to be in Target's Accelerator. Despite mixed reviews, their vegan ghee "Vhee" became an Amazon #1 New Release.

Tripathy's wife Sonia is a model, nutritionist, and scientist from the University of Pennsylvania. The couple are actively involved in various non-profits and travel the world advocating for nutrition equity, health and wellness, and environmental impact. They have also been seen working with 'The Good Karma' program to feed the unhoused in Los Angeles.

== Filmography ==
Year	Film	Role	Company	Notes
2009	Dance Flick	Club Victim	Paramount Pictures	
2010	Naked Innocence	Writer / Director	SunnyTFilms	
2010	Keeping Up With The Guptas	Writer / Director	SunnyTFilms	
2011	The Locket	Writer / Director	SunnyTFilms	
2011	Troublemaker	Sameer	Shetani Films	
2012	Sunset Strip	Marketing Agent	SpeakEasy Films	
2014	Rajas of Rodeo	Lead	Lionsgate	Complete
2015	Untitled Sunny Tripathy Project	Writer / Supervising Producer	20th Century Fox Television	Status Unknown
2016	Mahabharat	Writer / Executive Producer	Bazelevs	Status Unknown
2023	Untitled Tripathy Dance Comedy	Writer / Producer	TriStar	In Development
2023	The Other Patels	Writer / Creator	Sony Pictures Television	In Development
2023	Untitled Sunny Tripathy Savan Kotecha Project	Writer	Sony Pictures Animation	Status Unknown
2024	Untitled Sunny Tripathy Court Five Project	Writer	Disney	In Development
2024	Untitled Food Sitcom	Writer / Creator	Jax Media	Status Unknown
2025	Untitled Sunny Tripathy David Hoberman Project	Writer	DreamWorks Animation	In Development
2025	The Prize	Writer / Producer	Invention Studios	In Development
2025	Realtors	Writer	Unknown	In Development

== Awards and nominations ==
Award	Event	Year	Result
PCAC Young Artists Award	PCAC	2007	Won
Best Teen Comedian	Last Teen Comic Standing	2008	Won
Best Drama	Campus Movie Festival UCLA	2010	Won
AT&T Rethink Possible Award	Campus Movie Festival UCLA	2010	Won
People's Choice Award	Campus Movie Festival UCLA	2010	Won
Best Commercial	MoFilm Chevy Volt Competition	2011	Won
Best Drama	Action on Film Festival	2011	Nominated
Best Music Video	Action on Film Festival	2011	Nominated
Award of Merit	Accolade Festival	2011	Won
Mr. Photogenic	Mr. / Miss India America	2012	Won
Mr. India Global	Mr. / Miss India America	2012	Won
