= William H. Gardiner =

Photographer (1861–1935)

William H. Gardiner (1861–1935) was a Victorian-era photographer. He is best known for his work on Mackinac Island, Michigan.

== Life ==
=== In Canada ===
Gardiner was born in 1861 in Brampton, Canada West. Little is known of his early life. His father, William Clarke Gardiner, was a hotel keeper. The family lived in the small town of Avening north of Orangeville, Ontario from 1866 until about 1874, when they moved to Toronto. What led Gardiner into photography is not known, but he chose it as a career from an early age. When he was only twenty the Toronto directory listed him as a photographer, boarding with his parents. In 1883 he married Louise East. They had two children, H. (Harry) Marshall and Ethel. In the early 1880s Gardiner worked for prominent and respected Toronto photographers, first Thomas E. Perkins and then Samuel J. Dixon. In the latter 1880s Gardiner moved to Orangeville, sixty miles northwest of Toronto. He opened his own photographic business for a time before joining the William Still Studio. By 1888 he had returned to Toronto and opened a studio. Times were apparently not good and by 1890 Gardiner is no longer listed in the city directory as a photographer, but as a "fruitier" with his wife Louise. They soon emigrated to the United States.

=== Move to the United States ===
The Gardiners established themselves in Detroit, where William once again took up photography. The city directory lists several business locations from 1891 through 1896. Like many photographers, he produced portraits as well as commercial work. Several views of downtown Detroit and Belle Isle Park survive in his negative collection. There are also a number of photos of buildings at Grace Hospital, one photo of the State Capitol at Lansing and a group of photos of an unidentified "hobby" farm, likely in southwest Michigan. These Detroit views document that he was doing more than portraits, and are very likely only a portion of his work there. One of Gardiner's photos, of the Detroit Health Department, appears in the 1901 City of Detroit Annual Report.

At some point after his arrival in Michigan, Gardiner visited Mackinac Island; the exact date is not known. His earliest Mackinac images date to 1896, the year he opened his gallery in the studio formerly occupied by the Foley Brothers in the Marquette Building at corner of Fort and Main Streets. The Petoskey Daily Resorter announced he was "prepared to do all work and in the latest styles." Within a few years he moved down the street to the second floor of Fenton's Bazaar, where he would remain for the remainder of his career. Gardiner was drawn to the resort life, for at about the same time he came to Mackinac Island he began spending his winters in Daytona, Florida. He may have been plying his trade there as early as 1894. In 1901 he and Louise opened "Gardiner's Gift and Art Shop" in downtown Daytona. Gardiner ran his studio in the back of the building, while Louise operated the store at the front. Thus, at the turn of the twentieth century the course of Gardiner's life was set, with a summer studio on Mackinac Island and a winter one in Daytona. Daytona appears to have been his place of primary residence after 1905 (he remained in the Detroit residential listings until 1905), where he was active in civic affairs. He eventually purchased the building he was renting along with adjacent property to construct the Gardiner Building, a retail and office block. Along with his son Marshall, he was involved in other real estate ventures including purchasing the Colony House (Palmetto) Hotel. The hotel burned in 1922 and the Gardiners replaced it with apartments and two residences, one for himself and Louise and the other for H. Marshall and his family. H. Marshall Gardiner the son of William H. Gardiner, was also a photographer and began work in Bermuda in the early twentieth century and in 1910 established a summer shop in Nantucket, Massachusetts.

A true distinction of Gardiner's work, and the one that would become his legacy, was the production of hand-tinted views. All Mackinac photographers offered prints of scenic island locations. Gardiner offered regular black and white prints, framed or unframed. His colored views, each hand tinted, were a cut above the rest. Hand-tinted scenic views were popularized in the United States by Wallace Nutting. A New England Congregational minister, Nutting was forced into retirement while only forty-three due to ill health. He developed a deep interest in early American architecture and decorative arts and became a pioneer of the Colonial Revival and preservation movements. Nutting published extensively on early American furniture and began to produce reproductions of the same. He also took an interest in photography, focusing on early American themes. Nutting's hand-colored images of New England, Florida and Ireland often highlighted their archaic historical charm. They were very popular, and Nutting is known as the father of early twentieth-century hand colored photos. Numerous photographers across the country emulated the Nutting style, producing views of picturesque locals. Gardiner likely began producing his hand-colored photographs of Mackinac Island and Florida in the early twentieth century. The compositions closely resemble Nutting's. Each was inscribed with the title and Gardiner's signature "W. H. Gardiner" in pencil at the bottom. H. Marshall Gardiner would produce the same type of images in Florida, Bermuda and Nantucket. Gardiner also continued to market un-tinted images, both framed and unframed. Gardiner continued operating his studio and shop throughout World War I, the Roaring Twenties and into the Great Depression.

He likely switched from glass plates to film negatives around 1915. None of these have survived. On October 22, 1935, on his annual autumn journey from Mackinac to Daytona, William H. Gardiner died of a heart attack. The studio and shop on the second floor of the Fenton Building on Mackinac Island remained property of the family until Louise and Marshall Gardiner's deaths in 1942, within days of each other. The contents of the studio were abandoned where they remained in an unused portion of the second floor for the next quarter century. William H. Gardiner and Louise were survived by their son H. Marshall Gardiner and his sister. H. Marshall Gardiner became a famous photographer in Nantucket, MA.
