= Robert S. C. Williams =

Robert S. C. Williams, CM is noted for his community service work in Ontario, Canada.

Beginning in Windsor, Ontario, Williams reorganized the city's Society of Saint Vincent de Paul, a benevolent organization. He also founded Windsor's Catholic Immigration Centre.

In Bramalea, Ontario, Williams founded the St. Leonard's Society of Canada, North America's first half-way house for released prisoners.

Williams was appointed to the Order of Canada in 1986.
