= Davie Mason =

Canadian football player (born 1984)

Profile
- Position: Running back

Personal information
- Born: April 3, 1984 (age 42); Brampton, Ontario, Canada
- Listed height: 5 ft 11 in (1.80 m)
- Listed weight: 238 lb (108 kg)

Career information
- College: Ottawa
- CFL draft: 2009: undrafted
- Stats at CFL.ca

Davie Mason (born April 3, 1984) is a Canadian former football running back. He played CIS football for the Ottawa Gee-Gees, and set a CIS single-game playoff record with 327 rushing yards in 2008. He was invited to the 2009 CFL Combine. He went undrafted and did not sign with a CFL team.
