= Joseph Onabolu =

- Birth name: Joseph Oluwaseun Onabolu
- Born: May 17, 1994 (age 30); Toronto, Ontario, Canada
- Genres: Pop
- Occupations: singer; songwriter
- Instrument: Vocals
- Years active: 2016–present

Joseph Oluwaseun Onabolu (born May 17, 1994), is a Canadian recording artist, singer and songwriter from Brampton, Ontario. In March 2016, Joseph released his debut EP, followed by his second EP From The Stars Above in August 2016.

== Career ==
In February 2016, Joseph Onabolu released his first single "All On Me". Production was done by Eestbound, who is signed to Canadian record producer WondaGurl. Joseph followed that with a second single called "Lonely" produced by FrancisGotHeat, who was part of the production team for Drake's More Life playlist. On March 31, 2016, Vice Magazine premiered Joseph's first EP Brad Bonds on their website.

== Artistry ==
Joseph Onabolu has said some of his biggest influences are Elvis, The Beatles, and Ed Sheeran. He has been compared to John Legend.

== Discography ==
=== Singles ===
- Lonely
- All On Me
- Passing
- Don't Be Shy

=== Extended plays ===
- From The Stars Above
