= Robert Smith (Ontario politician) =

Canadian politician

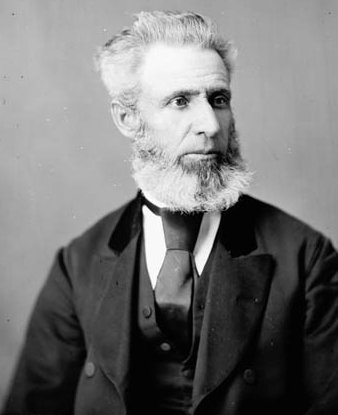

Member of the Canadian Parliament for Peel
- In office 1872–1878
- Preceded by: John Hillyard Cameron
- Succeeded by: William Elliott

Personal details
- Born: April 11, 1819 County Armagh, Ireland
- Died: September 19, 1900 (aged 81) Brampton, Ontario
- Party: Liberal

Robert Smith (April 11, 1819 – September 19, 1900) was a Canadian politician and farmer.

Born in County Armagh, Ireland, Smith immigrated to British North America with his family in 1828 and settled in the Home District of Canada West, which was to become the County of Peel in Ontario, where he became a farmer. In 1847, he married Eliza Jane McCandless. Smith served on the councils for Chinguacousy Township and Peel County. He was an unsuccessful candidate for a seat in the Legislative Assembly of Ontario in 1867. Smith was narrowly elected to the 2nd Canadian Parliament in the 1872 federal election defeating the Conservative incumbent, John Hillyard Cameron, by 16 votes. He sat as a Liberal representing the riding of Peel and was re-elected in the 1874 election that brought the Liberal Party to power but defeated in the 1878 election that returned a Conservative government. Smith died in Brampton at the age of 81.
