= St. Paul's United Church (Brampton) =

St. Paul's United Church Brampton, Ontario
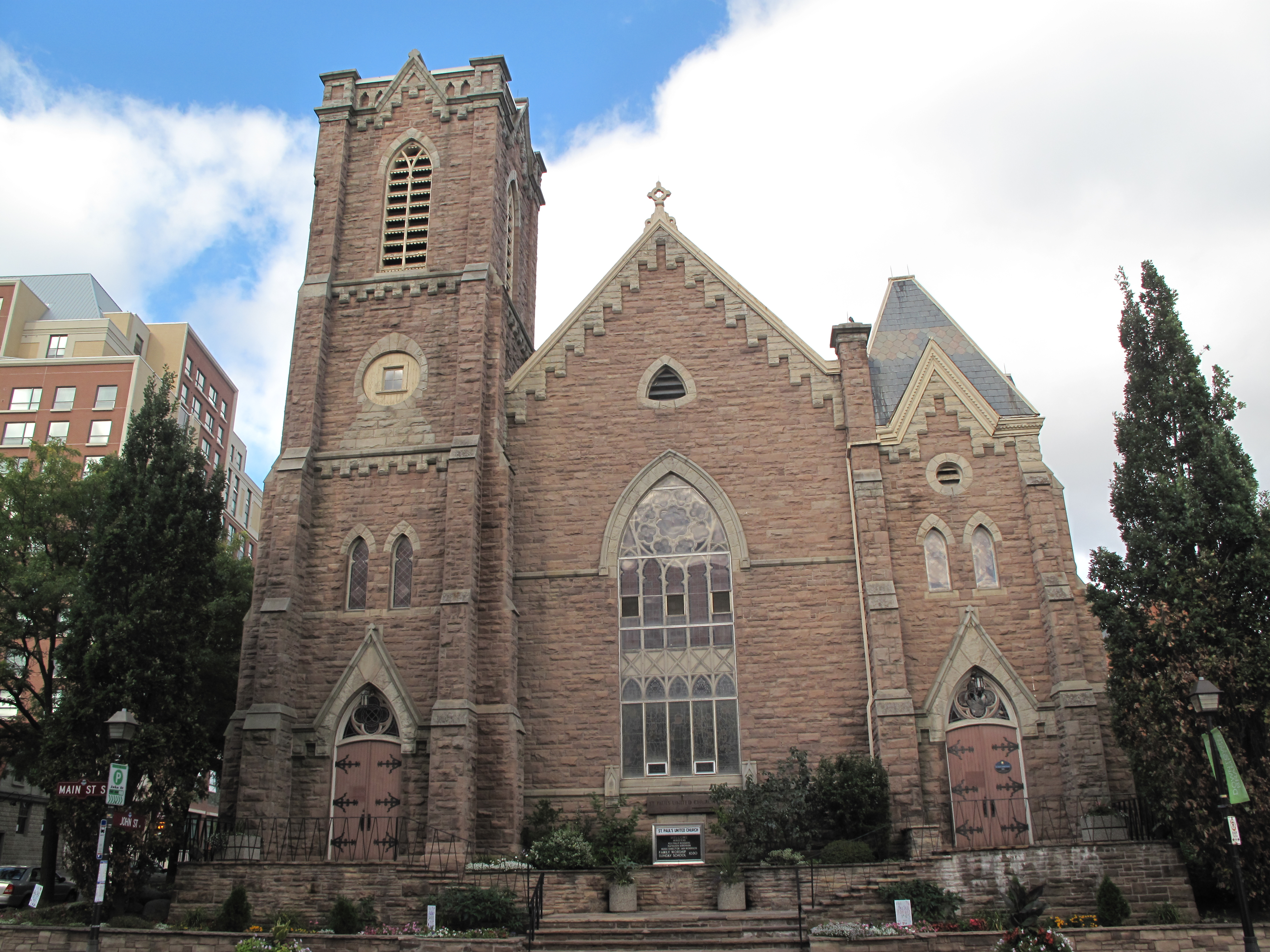
- St. Paul's United Church
- St. Paul's United Church Brampton, Ontario
- Location: Main Street South, Brampton, Ontario
- Denomination: United Church of Canada
- Website: http://www.stpauls.brampton.on.ca/ St. Paul's United Church

History
- Dedication: St. Paul

Architecture
- Functional status: Active
- Architect: W.J. Mallory

Administration
- Province: Canada
- Diocese: United Diocese of Ontario
- Parish: Ontario

St. Paul's United Church is one of the largest churches in Brampton, Ontario, Canada, and the second oldest. St. Paul's is a part of the largest Protestant organization of churches in Canada, the United Church of Canada. Located in downtown Brampton, it is the Second Primitive Methodist Church in Brampton built and dedicated on June 6, 1885. The building has been designated as a Heritage Site by the City of Brampton.

== Building Construction ==
The frame is constructed of limestone hewn from the Credit Valley quarries owned by Kenneth Chisholm near Cheltenham. This Credit Valley stone was also used for the building of the 1873 Union Station in Toronto, Government House (Ontario) and St. Peter's Seminary (Diocese of London, Ontario). The St. Paul's United Church roof was made from multicoloured slate. Large stained glass windows in the north, south, and west ends of the building display a fine decorative pattern. The building became home to the Methodists when they joined the United Church of Canada 1925. Today, the historic sanctuary is a popular place for weddings and concerts.

== St. Paul's United Church People Connections ==
Services are held each Sunday at 10:00 a.m. The current St. Paul's Youth Group has their own Facebook page. Due to the excellent acoustic design, The Brampton Symphony and the Brampton Festival Singers use the sanctuary for music concerts. Opera singer Tonia Cianciulli has performed at St. Paul's United Church.
