= Bill Davis =

18th premier of Ontario (1929–2021)

The Honourable Bill Davis PC CC OOnt QC
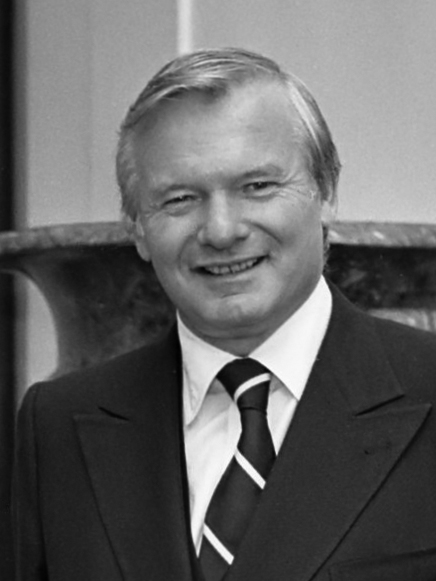
- Davis in 1979

18th Premier of Ontario
- In office March 1, 1971 – February 8, 1985
- Monarch: Elizabeth II
- Lieutenant Governor: William Ross Macdonald; Pauline Mills McGibbon; John Black Aird
- Deputy: Bob Welch
- Preceded by: John Robarts
- Succeeded by: Frank Miller
Executive Council of Ontario
Minister of University Affairs
In office May 14, 1964 – March 1, 1971
Premier	John Robarts
Preceded by	Riding established
Succeeded by	John White
Minister of Education
In office October 25, 1962 – March 1, 1971
Premier	John Robarts
Preceded by	John Robarts
Succeeded by	Bob Welch
Parliamentary constituencies
Member of the Ontario Provincial Parliament for Brampton (Peel North; 1967–1975) (Peel; 1959–1967)
In office June 11, 1959 – May 2, 1985
Preceded by	Thomas Laird Kennedy
Succeeded by	Bob Callahan

Personal details
- Born: William Grenville Davis; July 30, 1929 Toronto, Ontario, Canada
- Died: August 8, 2021 (aged 92) Brampton, Ontario, Canada
- Party: Progressive Conservative
- Spouses: Helen MacPhee (m. 1955; died 1962); Kathleen MacKay (m. 1964)
- Children: 5
- Education: University College, Toronto (BA); Osgoode Hall Law School (LLB)

William Grenville Davis PC CC OOnt QC (July 30, 1929 – August 8, 2021) was a Canadian politician who served as the 18th premier of Ontario from 1971 to 1985. Behind Oliver Mowat, Davis was the second-longest serving premier of Ontario.

Born in Toronto, Davis was a lawyer before being elected as a Progressive Conservative member of provincial Parliament for Peel in the 1959 provincial election. He was a backbencher in the Conservative caucus until 1962, when he was appointed minister of education under John Robarts. During this period, Davis created the community college system and the educational television network now known as TVO.

In 1971, he succeeded Robarts as the premier of Ontario and held the position until resigning in 1985. He led the Progressive Conservatives to victory in four consecutive elections, winning two majority governments and two minority governments. As premier, Davis was responsible for the cancellation of the Spadina Expressway, the funding of Catholic secondary schools through grade 12, the formation of Canada's first Ministry of the Environment, and rent control, as well as playing a large role in the patriation of the Constitution of Canada.

== Early life and education ==
Davis was born on July 30, 1929, at Toronto General Hospital, Toronto, Ontario, the son of Vera Mildred (née Hewetson) and Albert Grenville Davis. His father was a successful local lawyer. Davis married twice, first to Helen McPhee (1931-1962) in 1955, with whom he had four children (Neil, Nancy, Cathy, Ian). He then married Kathleen Mackay (1933-2025) in 1964; they had one daughter, Meg, in 1965.

Davis was politically active from the age of 15. Local Progressive Conservative Member of Parliament (MP) Gordon Graydon was a frequent guest at Davis's parents' house, and Davis himself became the first delegate younger than seventeen years to attend a national Progressive Conservative convention in Canada. He frequently campaigned for local Member of Provincial Parliament (MPP) Thomas Laird Kennedy, who briefly served as Premier of Ontario in 1949.

Davis graduated from the University of Toronto with a BA in 1951. He was a football player during his university years, and his teammates included Roy McMurtry and Thomas Leonard Wells, both of whom would later serve in his cabinet. Davis received a bachelor of laws from Osgoode Hall Law School in 1954 and was called to the bar of Ontario in 1955.

== Early political career ==
Davis was first elected to the Legislative Assembly of Ontario in the 1959 provincial election, for the southern Ontario constituency of Peel. He was only 29 years old. Although Peel was an extremely safe Conservative seat for most of its history, Davis won by a narrow 1,203 votes. The election took place soon after the federal Progressive Conservative government of John Diefenbaker had cancelled the Avro Arrow program. Davis was given the honour of move the motion to vote on the Speech from the Throne, which while purely symbolic, allowed him to give a speech that included two of his own planned projects: establishing what would become the Forks of the Credit Provincial Park, and improving education. Davis served for two years as a backbench supporter of Leslie Frost's government. When Frost announced his retirement in 1961, Davis became the chief organizer of Robert Macaulay's campaign to succeed him as premier and party leader. Macaulay was eliminated on the next-to-last ballot, and, with Davis, delivered crucial support for John Robarts to defeat Kelso Roberts on the final vote.

== Minister of Education ==
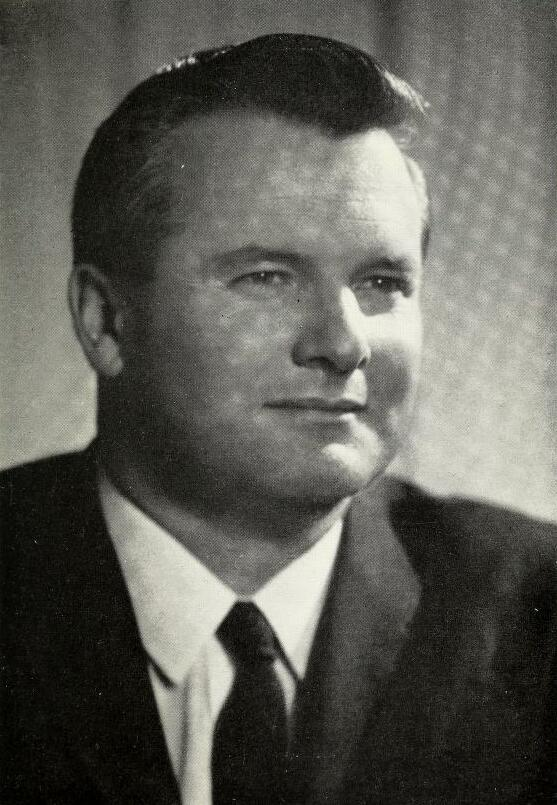
Davis as Minister of Education, 1966

Davis was appointed to Robarts' cabinet as Minister of Education on October 25, 1962, and was re-elected by a greatly increased margin in the 1963 provincial election. He was given additional responsibilities as Ontario's Minister of University Affairs on May 14, 1964, and held both portfolios until 1971. He significantly increased education funding during the 1960s; spending increased by 454% between 1962 and 1971 and hundreds of public schools were opened. Davis also oversaw a controversial overhaul and amalgamation of the outdated school board systems in the province, reducing the number of boards from 3,676 in 1962 to 192 by 1967.

During his tenure as education minister, Davis established new public universities, including Trent University and Brock University, as well as the public community college system. Canada's first educational research institute, the Ontario Institute for Studies in Education, and the Ontario Educational Communications Authority educational television network (now TVO) were established while he was Minister, in 1965 and 1970, respectively.

Davis's handling of the education portfolio, of which Robarts was a previous minister, made his entry into the leadership contest to succeed Robarts unsurprising. Robarts himself fully expected Davis to be his successor. He was immediately dubbed the frontrunner when he announced his bid on December 20, 1970. In the early hours of February 13, 1971, Davis defeated rival candidate Allan Lawrence by only 44 votes on the final ballot, after receiving support from third-place candidate Darcy McKeough. Following the convention, Davis brought Lawrence's campaign team, known as "the Spades", to become his principal advisors. The group later became known as the Big Blue Machine, and remained a dominant campaign force in the Progressive Conservative Party into the 1980s.

=== Cabinet posts ===
Robarts ministry, Province of Ontario (1961–1971)
Cabinet posts (2)
Predecessor	Office	Successor
New position	Minister of University Affairs; 1964–1971	John White
John Robarts	Minister of Education; 1962–1971	Bob Welch

== Premier of Ontario (1971–1985) ==
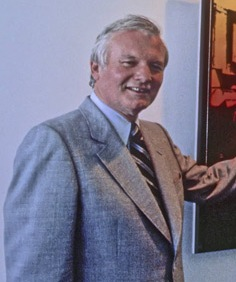
Davis in 1984

=== First majority (1971–1975) ===
Three months after taking office as premier, Davis announced that his government would not continue to fund construction of the Spadina Expressway into downtown Toronto—an initiative that had been unpopular with many of the area's residents. The section of Allen Road south of Lawrence Avenue was subsequently nicknamed the "Davis ditch". In July 1971, he created appointed the first Minister of the Environment, George Kerr. On August 31, Davis announced the rejection of a proposal to grant full funding to Ontario's Catholic high schools—which were only publicly funded up to grade 10—stating that it "would fragment the present system beyond recognition and repair". The campaign to elect the 29th Legislative Assembly of Ontario began two weeks later on September 13. The campaign featured the first televised leaders debate for a provincial election. The PC's would gain 9 seats in the election, held on October 21, 1971.

Davis's first full term as premier was by most accounts his least successful, with public confidence in his government weakened by a series of scandals. There were allegations that the Fidinam company had received special consideration for a Toronto development program in return for donations to the Progressive Conservative Party. In 1973, it was revealed that Davis's friend Gerhard Moog had received a untendered C$44.4 million ($306 million in 2025 dollars) contract for the construction of Ontario Hydro's new head office and related projects. Attorney General Dalton Bales, Solicitor General John Yaremko and Treasurer McKeough were all accused of conflicts-of-interest relating to government approval for developments on properties they owned. The government was cleared of impropriety in all cases, but its popular support nonetheless declined. The Conservatives lost four key by-elections in 1973 and 1974.

On the policy front, the Davis administration introduced regional governments for Durham, Hamilton-Wentworth, Haldimand-Norfolk, and Waterloo but shelved further plans in response to popular protests. He faced a significant backlash from teachers in December 1973, following the tabling of a bill to force an end to labour disruptions. In the buildup to the 1975 provincial election, Davis imposed a ninety-day freeze on energy prices, temporarily reduced the provincial sales tax from 7% to 5%, and announced rent controls for the province.

=== Minority governments (1975–1981) ===
The 1975 campaign was far more bitter than that of 1971, with Davis and Liberal leader Robert Nixon repeatedly hurling personal insults at one another. Polls taken shortly before the election had the Liberals in the lead. The Progressive Conservatives won only 51 seats out of 125, but were able to remain in power with a minority government. The New Democratic Party (NDP) won 38 seats under the leadership of Stephen Lewis, while Nixon's Liberals finished third with 36. Soon after the election, Davis hired Hugh Segal as his legislative secretary. On January 1, 1976, Davis enacted Canada's first mandatory seat belt law, following the death of the daughter of his close friend and advisor, Eddie Goodman.

Davis called a snap election in 1977, attempting to capitalise on the turmoil and surprise following the 1976 Quebec general election that saw the Parti Quebecois gain a majority. He was again returned with only a minority following the vote on June 9. The Progressive Conservatives increased their standing by 7 to 58 seats, against 34 for the Liberals and 33 for the NDP. The Conservatives remained the dominant party after the 1975 and 1977 elections due to the inability of either the New Democrats and the Liberals to become the clear alternative. The Conservatives were able to stay in power due to the competition between both opposition parties. As there was no serious consideration of a Liberal-NDP alliance after both campaigns, Davis was able to avoid defeat in the legislature by appealing to other parties for support on particular initiatives. The opposition parties had also undergone leadership changes; Nixon and Lewis, who had posed a strong challenge to Davis, resigned after the 1975 and 1977 elections, respectively. Nixon's successor Stuart Lyon Smith proved unable to increase Liberal support, while new NDP leader Michael Cassidy lacked the support of the party establishment.

This period of the Davis government was one of expansion for the province's public health and education systems, and Davis held a particular interest in ensuring that the province's community colleges remained productive. The government also expanded the provisions of the Ontario Human Rights Code, and expanded bilingual services without introducing official bilingualism to the province.

Although he actively supported and campaigned for him in 1976, Davis had an awkward relationship with federal Progressive Conservative leader Joe Clark. He and Clark held differing views over fuel prices, and the Davis government actively opposed Clark's 1979 austerity budget which included a gas tax.

=== Second majority (1981–1985) ===
The Progressive Conservatives were returned with a majority government in the 1981 provincial election, with 8 of their 12 gained seats coming at the expense of the NDP. Soon after the election, Davis announced that John Tory (who became leader of the PCs 23 years later) had been hired to succeed Hugh Segal as his principal secretary. He also announced that Ontario would purchase a 25% share in the energy corporation Suncor, despite opposition from within his own caucus.

Unlike most provincial premiers in Canada, Davis strongly supported Prime Minister Pierre Trudeau's 1981 plans to patriate the constitution of Canada from the United Kingdom and add to it the Canadian Charter of Rights and Freedoms. Davis's role in the constitutional negotiations of 1981 were pivotal in achieving a compromise that resulted in the passage of the Constitution Act, 1982.

Davis publicly announced his retirement on October 8, 1984, a few months before the 1985 election, with he and his government still well ahead in polls against David Peterson's Liberals and Bob Rae's NDP. One of his last major acts as premier was to reverse his 1971 decision against the full funding of Catholic schools, and announce that such funding would be provided to the end of Grade Thirteen. Although the policy was supported by all parties in the legislature, it was unpopular with some in the Conservatives' traditional rural Protestant base, and many would stay home in the upcoming election because of this issue.

Davis was succeeded by Frank Miller, who was elected leader at a January 1985 leadership convention over Larry Grossman (who was widely considered the successor to Davis and his Big Blue Machine). Although Miller was more conservative, the Progressive Conservatives still held a significant lead over the opposition when the election was called. However, after a poor campaign and controversy over Catholic school funding, in the 1985 provincial election they were reduced to a minority government and lost the popular vote to the Liberal Party, and were soon defeated in a motion of non-confidence by a Liberal–NDP accord, ending the party's 42-year period of rule over the province.

== Post-political career ==
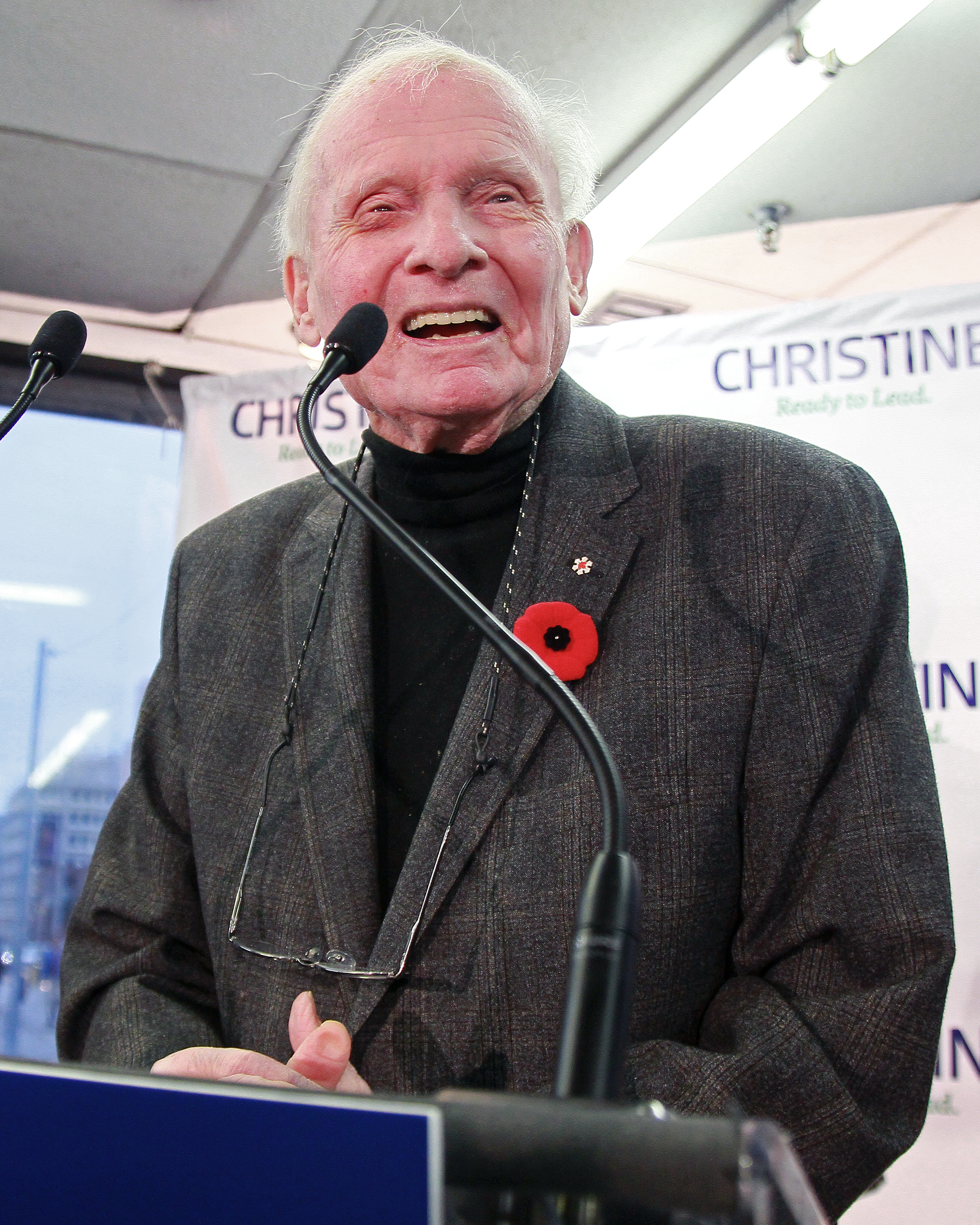
Davis in 2014

Davis was made a companion of the Order of Canada in 1986, and received the Order of Ontario in 1987. Upon his retirement from politics, he served on numerous corporate boards, including Seagram, Power Corporation, CIBC, Rogers Cable among others. In 1985 and 1986, Davis was the Canadian half of a joint task force with the United States (with Drew Lewis as his American counterpart) appointed by Brian Mulroney and Ronald Reagan to solve the ongoing acid rain issues affecting the Great Lakes. Their report was popularly referred to as the Acid Rain Treaty; Davis was paid $1 for his work, proudly framing the bill at his cottage.

Davis's reputation within the Ontario Progressive Conservatives was compromised during the 1990s by the party's shift to the right under Mike Harris. Many Conservative parliamentarians were openly dismissive of Davis-era spending policies, and frequently highlighted the differences between Davis and Harris on policy issues. Davis remained a supporter of the party, but seldom appeared at official events.

In 2003, Davis played a role in the successful negotiations to merge the federal Progressive Conservatives with the Canadian Alliance, and create the new Conservative Party of Canada. In the 2006 federal campaign, he campaigned for Conservative Leader Stephen Harper. Harper spoke favourably of Davis during the campaign, and said that he learned much from Davis's style of governing. The Conservatives were able to defeat the Liberals to form the government.

In the early 2000s, Davis returned to an honoured position within the Ontario Progressive Conservative Party. He was a keynote speaker at the 2004 Progressive Conservative leadership convention, and was singled out for praise in speeches by outgoing party leader Ernie Eves and new leader John Tory. Davis was also present for Tory's first session in the Ontario legislature, following the latter's victory in a 2005 by-election. In 2014, Davis endorsed Christine Elliott in her second campaign to become leader of the Ontario PC Party, but she finished as runner-up to Patrick Brown, whom he would later endorse in his successful campaign against incumbent Linda Jeffrey for mayor of Brampton in 2018.

Davis had supported Jeffrey in her 2014 bid for mayor, as well as Toronto mayor John Tory, former Ontario PC Party leader and a principal secretary of Davis in the 1980s. Incumbent Brampton mayor Susan Fennell was embroiled in numerous scandals over expenses and financial record-keeping. Davis reportedly convinced Jeffrey to resign from provincial cabinet to challenge Fennell. After taking office as mayor, Jeffrey appointed Davis to a panel tasked with bringing a university to Brampton. However, Davis and Jeffrey had a falling out over Peel Region's proposed Light Rail Transit line, as Jeffrey supported its extension from Hurontario Street in Mississauga further north along Main Street in Brampton (where it would run by Davis's house), while Davis preferred an alternative alignment along Queen Street.

Throughout his political career, Davis often remarked upon the lasting influence of his hometown of Brampton, leading to his nickname, "Brampton Billy".

== Death ==
On August 8, 2021, Davis died in Brampton at the age of 92.

== Legacy ==
In a 2012 edition, the Institute for Research on Public Policy's magazine, Policy Options, named Davis the second-best Canadian premier of the last forty years, beaten only by Peter Lougheed.

== Recognition ==
- In 1987, Davis was made an Honorary Senior Fellow of Renison University College, located in Waterloo, Ontario.
- Davis was appointed as a Companion of the Order of Canada in 1986, received the Order of Ontario in 1987, and was appointed as a Knight in the Legion of Honour of France in 2001.
- On October 24, 2006, Davis received Seneca College's first Honorary degree and was presented with an Honorary Bachelor of Applied Studies. "It is fitting that Bill Davis receives Seneca's first honorary degree", said Dr. Rick Miner, President of Seneca College. "As one of the architects of the college system in Ontario, he is responsible for a dynamic post-secondary education environment which continues to be a pillar of our province's economy."
- The Public Policy Forum honoured Bill Davis with the Testimonial Award for his contribution to public life, public policy and governance in Canada at their 2011 Testimonial Dinner.

=== Eponyms ===
- William G. Davis Public School – Windsor
- W. G. Davis Senior Public School – Brampton
- William G. Davis Field, Cardinal Leger Secondary School, Brampton
- William G. Davis Senior Public School – Cambridge
- William G. Davis Public School – Toronto (Scarborough)
- Davis Campus, Sheridan College – Brampton
- William G. Davis Building, University of Toronto Mississauga – Mississauga
- William G. Davis Centre for Computer Research, University of Waterloo – Waterloo
- William G. Davis Studio at TVO (where The Agenda with Steve Paikin, who was author of book on Davis, is televised from)
- William G. Davis Trail – Ontario Place, Toronto
- A. Grenville and William Davis Courthouse – Brampton
- Premier Davis Boulevard (Seneca College Newnham Campus) – North York
