= Joseph Featherston =

Canadian politician (1843–1913)

Joseph Featherston

Joseph Featherston or Featherstone (22 July 1843 – 17 July 1913) was a Canadian Liberal Party politician, livestock advocate and farmer.

His career consisted of being a farmer and thoroughbred dealer in Toronto Township. He was president of the Dominion Live Stock Association in 1887 and 1st vice president of the Dominion Live Stock Insurance Company from 1887 – 1888. He also served as president of the Canadian Swine Breeders Association from 1890 – 1891. He served as a councillor, deputy reeve and reeve before entering federal politics.

He was chosen as a Liberal candidate in Peel County to contest the general election for the House of Commons in 1891 against the sitting Conservative member William Armstrong McCulla. Featherston won that election with a 54 majority, in what has been described as a "keen and exciting contest." That election was declared void; a by-election which was held on 11 February 1892, gave Featherston a majority of 133.

The next election Featherston participated in was against A. F. Campbell, publisher of the Brampton Conservator. Featherston triumphed by a majority of 466, or 1891 to 1425. This marked the first time any Peel candidate won by a margin of over 100. Featherston's streak ended in 1900, to Richard Blain.
