= Peel (provincial electoral district) =

Peel (1867-1967) Peel North & Peel South (1967-1975)
Ontario electoral district

Defunct provincial electoral district
- Legislature: Legislative Assembly of Ontario
- District created: 1867
- District abolished: 1975
- First contested: 1867
- Last contested: 1971

Peel was a provincial riding in Central Ontario, Canada. It elected one member to the Legislative Assembly of Ontario. It was created in 1867 for the area west of Toronto and York County, west of Halton County/Trafalgar Township, going north from Lake Ontario to Caledon / Albion (ending at the boundaries with Dufferin and Simcoe Counties). After 1967 Peel was split into two as Peel North and Peel South.

== Members of Provincial Parliament: Peel (1867-1967) ==
Peel
Assembly	Years	Member	Party
Riding created
1st	1867–1871	John Coyne	Conservative
2nd	1871–1873	John Coyne	Conservative
2nd	1873–1874	Kenneth Chisholm	Liberal
3rd	1875–1879	Kenneth Chisholm	Liberal
4th	1879–1883	Kenneth Chisholm	Liberal
5th	1883–1886	Kenneth Chisholm	Liberal
6th	1886–1890	Kenneth Chisholm	Liberal
7th	1890–1893	Kenneth Chisholm	Liberal
7th	1893–1894	John Smith	Liberal
8th	1894–1898	John Smith	Liberal
9th	1898–1902	John Smith	Liberal
10th	1902–1905	John Smith	Liberal
11th	1905–1908	John Smith	Liberal
12th	1908–1911	Samuel Charters	Conservative
13th	1911–1913	Samuel Charters	Conservative
13th	1913–1914	James Fallis	Conservative
14th	1914–1916	James Fallis	Conservative
14th	1916–1919	William James Lowe	Liberal
15th	1919–1923	Thomas Laird Kennedy	Conservative
16th	1923–1926	Thomas Laird Kennedy	Conservative
17th	1926–1929	Thomas Laird Kennedy	Conservative
18th	1929–1934	Thomas Laird Kennedy	Conservative
19th	1934–1937	Duncan Marshall	Liberal
20th	1937–1943	Thomas Laird Kennedy	Progressive Conservative
21st	1943–1945	Thomas Laird Kennedy	Progressive Conservative
22nd	1945–1948	Thomas Laird Kennedy	Progressive Conservative
23rd	1948–1951	Thomas Laird Kennedy	Progressive Conservative
24th	1951–1955	Thomas Laird Kennedy	Progressive Conservative
25th	1955–1959	Thomas Laird Kennedy	Progressive Conservative
26th	1959–1962	Bill Davis	Progressive Conservative
27th	1963–1967	Bill Davis	Progressive Conservative
Riding split into Peel North and Peel South
Sourced from the Ontario Legislative Assembly

=== Election results ===
1963 Ontario general election
Party	Candidate	Votes	%	±%
Progressive Conservative	Bill Davis	24,969	61.58	+18.60
Liberal	Ted Glista	10,400	25.65	–13.44
New Democratic	Emmett B. Roach	5,177	12.77	–5.16
Total valid votes		40,546	99.24	
Total rejected ballots		309	0.76	–0.12
Turnout		40,855	61.62	+2.17
Eligible voters		66,304		
Progressive Conservative hold		Swing		+16.02
Source: Elections Ontario

1959 Ontario general election
Party	Candidate	Votes	%	±%
Progressive Conservative	Bill Davis	13,278	42.98	–7.58
Liberal	Bill Brydon	12,075	39.09	+6.02
Co-operative Commonwealth	Bob Williams	5,537	17.92	+1.55
Total valid votes		30,890	99.13	
Total rejected ballots		272	0.87	–0.05
Turnout		31,162	59.45	–0.93
Eligible voters		52,419		
Progressive Conservative hold		Swing		–6.80
Source: Elections Ontario

1955 Ontario general election
Party	Candidate	Votes	%	±%
Progressive Conservative	Thomas Laird Kennedy	13,296	50.56	–6.04
Liberal	Ruth S. Houck	8,696	33.07	+7.26
Co-operative Commonwealth	Charles Donson Jenkins	4,305	16.37	–1.22
Total valid votes		26,297	99.08	
Total rejected ballots		245	0.92	–0.01
Turnout		26,542	60.38	–5.84
Eligible voters		43,957		
Progressive Conservative hold		Swing		–6.65
Source: Elections Ontario

1951 Ontario general election
Party	Candidate	Votes	%	±%
Progressive Conservative	Thomas Laird Kennedy	12,528	56.61	+9.36
Liberal	Carl Flaman	5,711	25.80	–2.29
Co-operative Commonwealth	Charles Donson Jenkins	3,893	17.59	–7.07
Total valid votes		22,132	99.07	
Total rejected ballots		208	0.93	+0.07
Turnout		22,340	66.22	+0.87
Eligible voters		33,735		
Progressive Conservative hold		Swing		+5.82
Source: Elections Ontario

1948 Ontario general election
Party	Candidate	Votes	%	±%
Progressive Conservative	Thomas Laird Kennedy	9,070	47.25	–8.94
Liberal	Robert J. Hiscox	5,393	28.09	+3.11
Co-operative Commonwealth	A. Herb Sovereign	4,733	24.66	+5.83
Total valid votes		19,196	99.14	
Total rejected ballots		167	0.86	+0.11
Turnout		19,363	65.35	–3.16
Eligible voters		29,628		
Progressive Conservative hold		Swing		–6.03
Source: Elections Ontario

1945 Ontario general election
Party	Candidate	Votes	%	±%
Progressive Conservative	Thomas Laird Kennedy	9,923	56.19	+5.92
Liberal	Leslie Hancock	4,412	24.98	–1.71
Co-operative Commonwealth	A. Herb Sovereign	3,325	18.83	–4.21
Total valid votes		17,660	99.25	
Total rejected ballots		134	0.75	+0.20
Turnout		17,794	68.52	+6.81
Eligible voters		25,970		
Progressive Conservative hold		Swing		+3.81
Source: Elections Ontario

1943 Ontario general election
Party	Candidate	Votes	%	±%
Progressive Conservative	Thomas Laird Kennedy	7,101	50.27	+1.40
Liberal	John Patterson	3,770	26.69	–20.53
Co-operative Commonwealth	Charles Rankin	3,254	23.04	+19.13
Total valid votes		14,125	99.45	
Total rejected ballots		78	0.55	–0.15
Turnout		14,203	61.71	–16.97
Eligible voters		23,016		
Progressive Conservative hold		Swing		+10.96
Source: Elections Ontario

1937 Ontario general election
Party	Candidate	Votes	%	±%
Conservative	Thomas Laird Kennedy	8,228	48.88	+1.94
Liberal	Duncan Marshall	7,949	47.22	–1.20
Co-operative Commonwealth	Russell Pawley	657	3.90	–0.74
Total valid votes		16,834	99.30	
Total rejected ballots		119	0.70	+0.08
Turnout		16,953	78.68	+0.64
Eligible voters		21,547		
Conservative gain from Liberal		Swing		+1.57
Source: Elections Ontario

1934 Ontario general election
Party	Candidate	Votes	%	±%
Liberal	Duncan Marshall	7,960	48.42	–
Conservative	Thomas Laird Kennedy	7,716	46.93	–
Co-operative Commonwealth	Joseph Maund	764	4.65	–
Total valid votes		16,440	99.38	
Total rejected ballots		103	0.62	–
Turnout		16,543	78.04	–
Eligible voters		21,197		
Liberal gain from Conservative		Swing		–
Source: Elections Ontario

Ontario provincial by-election, 1930 Ministerial by-election, appointment as Minister of Agriculture
Party	Candidate	Votes
Conservative	Thomas Laird Kennedy	acclaimed
Source: Elections Ontario

1929 Ontario general election
Party	Candidate	Votes	%	±%
Conservative	Thomas Laird Kennedy	6,737	54.27	+2.77
Liberal	Thomas Herbert Graham	5,677	45.73	–
Total valid votes		12,414	99.43	
Total rejected ballots		71	0.57	+0.07
Turnout		12,485	69.65	+1.19
Eligible voters		17,926		
Conservative hold		Swing		+1.38
Source: Elections Ontario

1926 Ontario general election
Party	Candidate	Votes	%	±%
Conservative	Thomas Laird Kennedy	6,193	51.50	–4.83
Progressive	Herbert J. W. Taylor	5,832	48.50	–
Total valid votes		12,025	99.50	
Total rejected ballots		60	0.50	–0.43
Turnout		12,085	68.46	–
Eligible voters		17,653		
Conservative hold		Swing		–2.42
Source: Elections Ontario

1923 Ontario general election
Party	Candidate	Votes	%	±%
Conservative	Thomas Laird Kennedy	6,087	56.34	+16.19
United Farmers	Edward A. Orr	4,718	43.66	+23.03
Total valid votes		10,805	99.07	
Total rejected ballots		101	0.93	–1.27
Turnout		10,906	–	–
Eligible voters				
Conservative hold		Swing		–3.42
Source: Elections Ontario

1919 Ontario general election
Party	Candidate	Votes	%	±%
Conservative	Thomas Laird Kennedy	4,562	40.14	–7.13
Liberal	William James Lowe	4,457	39.22	–13.51
United Farmers	Manning Doherty	2,345	20.64	–
Total valid votes		11,364	97.81	
Total rejected ballots		255	2.19	+2.19
Turnout		11,619	87.72	–
Eligible voters		13,246		
Conservative gain from Liberal		Swing		+3.19
Source: Elections Ontario

Ontario provincial by-election, February 24, 1916 Resignation of James Robinson Fallis
Party	Candidate	Votes	%	±%
Liberal	William James Lowe	2,948	52.73	+8.95
Conservative	James Robinson Fallis	2,643	47.27	–8.95
Total valid votes		5,591	100.00	
Total rejected ballots		–		
Turnout		5,591	–	–
Eligible voters				
Liberal gain from Conservative		Swing		+8.95
Source: Elections Ontario

1914 Ontario general election
Party	Candidate	Votes	%	±%
Conservative	James Robinson Fallis	2,855	56.22	+1.87
Liberal	Albert Hodgson Milner	2,223	43.78	–1.87
Total valid votes		5,078	99.65	
Total rejected ballots		18	0.35	+0.35
Turnout		5,096	74.08	–
Eligible voters		6,879		
Conservative hold		Swing		+1.87
Source: Elections Ontario

Ontario provincial by-election, November 3, 1913 Resignation of Samuel Charters after appointment as Registrar
Party	Candidate	Votes	%	±%
Conservative	James Robinson Fallis	2,546	54.36	–3.27
Liberal	Albert Milner	2,138	45.64	+3.27
Total valid votes		4,684	100.00	
Total rejected ballots		–		
Turnout		4,684	–	–
Eligible voters				
Conservative hold		Swing		–3.27
Source: Elections Ontario

1911 Ontario general election
Party	Candidate	Votes	%	±%
Conservative	Samuel Charters	2,705	57.63	+2.84
Liberal	Robert Smith	1,989	42.37	–2.84
Total valid votes		4,694	99.28	
Total rejected ballots		34	0.72	–0.06
Turnout		4,728	70.55	–17.24
Eligible voters		6,702		
Conservative hold		Swing		+2.84
Source: Elections Ontario

1908 Ontario general election
Party	Candidate	Votes	%	±%
Conservative	Samuel Charters	2,852	54.78	+5.14
Liberal	John M. Godfrey	2,354	45.22	–5.14
Total valid votes		5,206	99.22	
Total rejected ballots		41	0.78	–0.01
Turnout		5,247	87.79	+0.92
Eligible voters		5,977		
Conservative gain from Liberal		Swing		+5.14
Source: Elections Ontario

1905 Ontario general election
Party	Candidate	Votes	%	±%
Liberal	John Smith	2,269	50.36	–1.02
Conservative	Samuel Charters	2,237	49.64	+1.02
Total valid votes		4,506	99.21	
Total rejected ballots		36	0.79	+0.68
Turnout		4,542	86.86	+5.22
Eligible voters		5,229		
Liberal hold		Swing		–1.02
Source: Elections Ontario

1902 Ontario general election
Party	Candidate	Votes	%	±%
Liberal	John Smith	2,296	51.38	–1.95
Conservative	Samuel Charters	2,173	48.62	+1.95
Total valid votes		4,469	99.89	
Total rejected ballots		5	0.11	–0.16
Turnout		4,474	81.64	+0.55
Eligible voters		5,480		
Liberal hold		Swing		–1.95
Source: Elections Ontario

1898 Ontario general election
Party	Candidate	Votes	%	±%
Liberal	John Smith	2,343	53.32	–1.46
Conservative	F. W. Beynon	2,051	46.68	–
Total valid votes		4,394	99.73	
Total rejected ballots		12	0.27	–0.26
Turnout		4,406	81.10	+5.51
Eligible voters		5,433		
Liberal hold		Swing		–0.73
Source: Elections Ontario

1894 Ontario general election
Party	Candidate	Votes	%	±%
Liberal	John Smith	2,273	54.78	–6.51
Conservative-Protestant Protective	R. Crawford	1,876	45.22	–
Total valid votes		4,149	99.47	
Total rejected ballots		22	0.53	+0.53
Turnout		4,171	75.59	–
Eligible voters		5,518		
Liberal hold		Swing		–3.26
Source: Elections Ontario

Ontario provincial by-election, December 30, 1892 Resignation of Kenneth Chisholm on appointment of Registrar for Peel County
Party	Candidate	Votes	%	±%
Liberal	John Smith	2,477	61.30	+9.76
Conservative	W. Cook	1,564	38.70	–
Total valid votes		4,041	100.00	
Total rejected ballots		–		
Turnout		4,041	–	–
Eligible voters				
Liberal hold		Swing		+4.88
Source: Elections Ontario

1890 Ontario general election
Party	Candidate	Votes	%	±%
Liberal	Kenneth Chisholm	2,059	51.54	–1.22
Conservative Equal Rights	James L. Hughes	1,936	48.46	–
Total valid votes		3,995	99.78	
Total rejected ballots		9	0.22	–0.23
Turnout		4,004	74.33	+0.69
Eligible voters		5,387		
Liberal hold		Swing		–0.61
Source: Elections Ontario

1886 Ontario general election
Party	Candidate	Votes	%	±%
Liberal	Kenneth Chisholm	2,102	52.76	+1.36
Conservative	A. F. Campbell	1,882	47.24	–1.36
Total valid votes		3,984	99.55	
Total rejected ballots		18	0.45	–0.09
Turnout		4,002	73.63	–2.77
Eligible voters		5,435		
Liberal hold		Swing		+1.36
Source: Elections Ontario

1883 Ontario general election
Party	Candidate	Votes	%	±%
Liberal	Kenneth Chisholm	1,521	51.40	–1.29
Conservative	Mr. Hamilton	1,438	48.60	+1.29
Total valid votes		2,959	99.46	
Total rejected ballots		16	0.54	+0.54
Turnout		2,975	76.40	+0.31
Eligible voters		3,894		
Liberal hold		Swing		–1.29
Source: Elections Ontario

1879 Ontario general election
Party	Candidate	Votes	%	±%
Liberal	Kenneth Chisholm	1,519	52.69	+0.70
Conservative	William Armstrong McCulla	1,364	47.31	−0.70
Total valid votes		2,883	76.09	+3.13
Eligible voters		3,789		
Liberal hold		Swing		+0.70
Source: Elections Ontario

1875 Ontario general election
Party	Candidate	Votes	%	±%
Liberal	Kenneth Chisholm	1,349	51.98	−3.18
Conservative	J.W. Beynon	1,246	48.02	+3.18
Total valid votes		2,595	72.95	
Eligible voters		3,557		
Liberal hold		Swing		−3.18
Source: Elections Ontario

Ontario provincial by-election, December 29, 1873 Death of John Coyne
Party	Candidate	Votes	%	±%
Liberal	Kenneth Chisholm	1,324	55.17	+6.52
Conservative	S. White	1,076	44.83	−6.52
Total valid votes		2,400	100.0	+10.24
Liberal gain from Conservative		Swing		+6.52
Source: History of the Electoral Districts, Legislatures and Ministries of the Province of Ontario

1871 Ontario general election
Party	Candidate	Votes	%	±%
Conservative	John Coyne	1,118	51.36	+0.30
Liberal	Mr. Bowles	1,059	48.64	−0.30
Independent	Frederick Chase Capreol	0	–	
Turnout		2,177	75.91	−6.20
Eligible voters		2,868		
Conservative hold		Swing		+0.30
Source: Elections Ontario

1867 Ontario general election
Party	Candidate	Votes	%
Conservative	John Coyne	1,118	51.05
Liberal	R. Smith	1,072	48.95
Total valid votes		2,190	82.11
Eligible voters		2,667	
Conservative pickup new district.			
Source: Elections Ontario

== Members of Provincial Parliament: Peel North (1967-1975) ==
Peel North
Assembly	Years	Member	Party
28th	1967–1971	Bill Davis	Progressive Conservative
29th	1971–1975	Bill Davis	Progressive Conservative
Riding dissolved into Brampton and Mississauga North
Sourced from the Ontario Legislative Assembly

=== Election results ===
1971 Ontario general election: Peel North
Party	Candidate	Votes	%	±%
Progressive Conservative	Bill Davis	29,851	59.48	+7.18
New Democratic	Neil Davis	11,259	22.43	–2.34
Liberal	Gary Ross Thaler	9,080	18.09	–4.83
Total valid votes		50,190	99.53	
Total rejected ballots		236	0.47	–0.13
Turnout		50,426	73.38	+8.11
Eligible voters		68,721		
Progressive Conservative hold		Swing		+4.76
Source: Elections Ontario

1967 Ontario general election: Peel North
Party	Candidate	Votes	%	±%
Progressive Conservative	Bill Davis	15,651	52.30	–
New Democratic	George Hill	7,415	24.78	–
Liberal	William H. Brydon	6,861	22.93	–
Total valid votes		29,927	99.40	
Total rejected ballots		180	0.60	–
Turnout		30,107	65.27	–
Eligible voters		46,127		
Progressive Conservative notional hold		Swing		–
Source: Elections Ontario

== Members of Provincial Parliament: Peel South (1967-1975) ==
Peel South
Assembly	Years	Member	Party
28th	1967–1971	Douglas Kennedy	Progressive Conservative
29th	1971–1975	Douglas Kennedy	Progressive Conservative
Riding dissolved into Mississauga South
Sourced from the Ontario Legislative Assembly

=== Election results ===
1971 Ontario general election: Peel South
Party	Candidate	Votes	%	±%
Progressive Conservative	Douglas Kennedy	29,569	54.63	+12.50
Liberal	Herbert C. Breithaupt	12,287	22.70	–8.03
New Democratic	Edward H. Humphreys	12,266	22.66	–4.47
Total valid votes		54,122	99.83	
Total rejected ballots		92	0.17	–0.52
Turnout		54,214	73.61	+5.68
Eligible voters		73,646		
Progressive Conservative hold		Swing		+10.27
Source: Elections Ontario

1967 Ontario general election: Peel South
Party	Candidate	Votes	%	±%
Progressive Conservative	Douglas Kennedy	13,377	42.13	–
Liberal	Ted Glista	9,759	30.74	–
New Democratic	Charles Donson Jenkins	8,616	27.14	–
Total valid votes		31,752	99.31	
Total rejected ballots		220	0.69	–
Turnout		31,972	67.94	–
Eligible voters		47,061		
Progressive Conservative notional hold		Swing		–
Source: Elections Ontario
