= Robert Corrigan =

Robert Corrigan may refer to:

- Robert Corrigan (murder victim) (c. 1816/17–1855), Irish-Canadian murdered by a group of men in Saint-Sylvestre, Lower Canada
- Robert A. Corrigan (1935–2024), American academic and president of San Francisco State University
- Robert W. Corrigan (1927–1993), American academic and founding editor of the Carleton Drama Review
