= John Pallett =

Canadian politician

Member of the Canadian Parliament for Peel
- In office 1954–1962
- Preceded by: Gordon Graydon
- Succeeded by: Bruce Beer

Personal details
- Born: February 15, 1921 Dixie, Ontario
- Died: October 3, 1985 (aged 64) Griffith Island, Ontario
- Party: Progressive Conservative
- Spouse: Mary Virginia Leuty
- Children: 5
- Profession: Lawyer
- Portfolio: Parliamentary Secretary to the Minister of Trade and Commerce (1959-1960); Parliamentary Secretary to the Prime Minister (1960-1962); Chief Government Whip (1959-1962)

John Cameron Pallett (February 15, 1921 – October 3, 1985) was a Canadian lawyer and politician.

== Background ==
Born in Dixie, Ontario, he was educated at University of Toronto, at which he got a B.A. in 1941. He served as a lieutenant in The Governor General's Horse Guards armoured reconnaissance division in England, France, Italy, Belgium, the Netherlands and Germany, from 1942 to 1945. He was awarded the 1939/1945 Star, the Italy Star, the France and Germany Star, and the Defence Medal. He was also awarded the Mentioned in Despatches medal for gallantry and distinguished service on the battlefield in Italy.

He then attended Osgoode Hall Law School, graduating with a Bachelor of Laws in 1947. He founded Pallett & Pallett law firm in 1948; subsequently Pallett Valo, Mississauga. He also served as a Bencher of the Law Society of Upper Canada. He was married to Mary Virginia Leuty and had five children: James McCormack, Megan Jane, Bruce Cameron, Drew Malcolm and Wesley Newman (July 21, 1962 to March 4, 1974).

He was the Chairman of the Mississauga Hospital Board of Directors; Chairman of the Mississauga Hospital Foundation Board of Directors; President of Port Credit Lions Club; President of Credit Valley Golf Club; President of Dixie Curling Club; Director of Griffith Island Club.

He died on Griffith Island in the Georgian Bay area in 1985.

== Politics ==
Pallett was a Member of Parliament of Canada from 1954 to 1962; Parliamentary Secretary to the Prime Minister of Canada; Chief Government Whip and leader of the Canadian NATO delegation to Europe in 1959.
