= James Fleming (Peel MP) =

Canadian politician

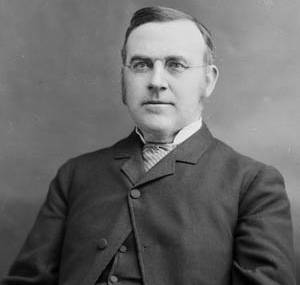
James Fleming Source: Library and Archives Canada

James Fleming (June 20, 1839 – October 5, 1902) was a lawyer, teacher and political figure in Ontario, Canada. He represented Peel in the House of Commons of Canada from 1882 to 1887 as a Liberal member.

He was born in Vaughan Township, Upper Canada, the son of Robert Fleming and Marion McMillan, both immigrants from Scotland. Fleming was educated at the Toronto normal school and taught school for several years. In 1866, he was called to the Upper Canada bar. In 1870, he married Isabella Montgomery. Fleming served as crown attorney and clerk of the peace for Peel County from 1879 to 1882. He also served as chairman of the school board for Brampton. Fleming ran unsuccessfully for reelection to the House of Commons in 1887.
