= James Robinson Fallis =

Canadian politician

Ontario MPP
- In office 1913–1916
- Preceded by: Samuel Charters
- Succeeded by: William James Lowe
- Constituency: Peel

Personal details
- Born: December 12, 1871; Brampton, Ontario
- Died: May 11, 1935 (aged 63); Brampton, Ontario
- Political party: Conservative Party of Ontario
- Spouse: Sarah Jane Lawson

James Robinson Fallis (December 12, 1871 – May 11, 1935) was an Ontario livestock dealer and political figure. He represented Peel in the Legislative Assembly of Ontario as a Conservative member from 1913 to 1916. He was born in Brampton, Ontario, the son of James Fallis, and educated there. In 1899, he married Sarah Jane Lawson. He was elected in a 1913 by-election held after Samuel Charters resigned his seat in the provincial assembly to become Registrar of Peel County. He died May 11, 1935.

== Career ==
In 1903, Fallis' steers were described in The Globe as being considered "the best that have ever entertained this market", the Union Stock Yards.

At the 1912 meeting of Peel's County Conservative Association, Fallis was elected secretary. On 27 October 1913, nominations for both the Liberal and Conservative parties of Peel were held at the Brampton Town Hall. The Liberals nominated the Reeve of Brampton, A. H. Milner, while Fallis received the Conservative nomination. Fallis' speech outlined his loyalty to Premier of Ontario Sir James Whitney, and his "business-like way" of running the province, highlighting the discounts created by his public hydro policy, good roads program, and reforms to the election process to remove numbering from ballots. Provincial agriculture minister James Duff campaigned for Fallis in Streetsville.

As incumbent, Fallis was chosen by the Conservative party as its nominee for the 1914 provincial election. Nominated by Reuben Lush, his candidacy was uncontested at the event, held at Brampton Town Hall. His acceptance speech denied misspending by his party's government, denied responsibility for rural depopulation, placing that blame on cities and Western provinces, and the introduction of the Workmen's Compensation Act.

At the beginning of the First World War, Fallis travelled to Ottawa, "securing a letter from officers of the Militia Department" allowing him to sell them horses. Returning to the County, he formed a partnership with horse-dealer E. J. Jones of Brampton, and they identified animals at area farms for Government inspection; any that were "passed" were purchased by Fallis or his firm. Fallis profited "less than $3000" and Jones "about $3500" in the horses resale to the government. Sir Charles Davidson's Commission of Inquiry took up the matter, with the Commission's counsel suggesting he "intervened for personal profit when the vendor and Government had been brought together, without rendering any service." Fallis insisted there was nothing wrong with the procedures, and that he didn't prevent farmers from selling direct to the government.

After being defeated by the Liberal candidate, William James Lowe, in the 1916 by-election, he continued to be active in the livestock trade.

After the death of Joseph Dixon in 1925, Fallis was sworn in as Peel's Surrogate Court Registrar and Local Registrar of the High Court. He shared Justice of the Peace duties with W. J. Fenton, as of 1929. He was also Chairman of the Brampton High School Board.

Fallis sold 300 acres of his 500-acre farm in 1927, in four parcels.

== Personal life ==
He married Jessie Fletcher on 6 October 1920. As of 1922, he was a Right Worthy Brother with the Masons, River Park Lodge, A. F. & A. M., No. 356, and as of 1929, the Potentate's Aide for a Rameses Temple. Fallis and Dr. D. L. Heggie were the Brampton Curling Club's representatives to the Ontario Curling Association as of 1930. He is also known to have refereed local lacrosse games, and served at least one season, 1911, as honorary President of the Brampton Excelsiors.

His sister, Miss Mary C. Fallis, was a teacher at Caledon, Broddytown, and finally Central Public School in Brampton, staying the grade 2 teacher at the last school for 36 years. Mother Euphemia Ella Fallis died in 1933.
