= John Coyne (politician) =

Canadian politician

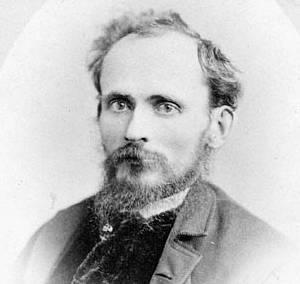

Ontario MPP
- In office 1867–1873
- Preceded by: Riding established
- Succeeded by: Kenneth Chisholm
- Constituency: Peel

Personal details
- Born: July 21, 1836 Toronto Township, Ontario
- Died: November 16, 1873 (aged 37) Brampton, Ontario
- Party: Conservative
- Spouse: Mary Catherine Scott
- Occupation: Lawyer

John Coyne (July 21, 1836 – November 16, 1873) was a Canadian barrister, and Peel County's first representative in the Ontario Legislature.

A native of Toronto Township, the son of Mr. and Mrs. Edward Coyne, he received his education in Brampton at Brampton Public School. He was educated as a lawyer, and called to the Bar of Upper Canada in 1864. Coyne also served as reeve of Brampton.

Entering provincial politics in 1867, as a Conservative, he beat out Liberal candidate Robert Smith by just 46 votes (1118 to 1072). The number 1118 had a strange, but merely coincidental, attraction to him, as proved by the next election in 1871. Posed against Chinguacousy's T. O. Bowles, he won again with 1118 votes, against 1059 Liberal nods.

Coyne married Mary Catherine Scott, the youngest daughter of Brampton resident John Scott, in October 1867.

He died due to a short illness in 1873, after serving only two years of his second term.

== Electoral history ==
1867 Ontario general election: Peel
Party	Candidate	Votes	%
Conservative	John Coyne	1,118	51.05
Liberal	R. Smith	1,072	48.95
Total valid votes		2,190	82.11
Eligible voters		2,667	
Conservative pickup new district.			
Source: Elections Ontario

1871 Ontario general election: Peel
Party	Candidate	Votes	%	±%
Conservative	John Coyne	1,118	51.36	+0.30
Liberal	Mr. Bowles	1,059	48.64	−0.30
Independent	Mr. Capreol	0	–	
Turnout		2,177	75.91	−6.20
Eligible voters		2,868		
Conservative hold		Swing		+0.30
Source: Elections Ontario
