= William James Lowe =

Canadian politician from Ontario

Member of the Ontario Provincial Parliament for Peel
- In office February 24, 1916 – September 23, 1919
- Preceded by: James Robinson Fallis
- Succeeded by: Thomas Laird Kennedy

Personal details
- Party: Liberal

William James Lowe was a Canadian politician from Ontario. He represented Peel in the Legislative Assembly of Ontario from a 1916 by-election to 1919.

== See also ==
- 14th Parliament of Ontario
