= Peel (federal electoral district) =

Former federal electoral district in Ontario, Canada

Ontario electoral district

Defunct federal electoral district
- Legislature: House of Commons
- District created: 1867
- District abolished: 1966
- First contested: 1867
- Last contested: 1965

Peel was a federal electoral district represented in the House of Commons of Canada from 1867 to 1968. It was located in the province of Ontario. It was created by the British North America Act 1867.

It consisted of the Townships of Chinguacousy, Toronto, and the Gore of Toronto, and the Villages of Brampton and Streetsville.

In 1903, it was redefined to consist of the county of Peel to include townships of Caledon and Albion.

The electoral district was abolished in 1966 when it was redistributed between Peel South and Peel—Dufferin ridings.

== Members of Parliament ==
Parliament	Years	Member	Party
1st	1867–1872	John Hillyard Cameron	Conservative
2nd	1872–1874	Robert Smith	Liberal
3rd	1874–1878	Robert Smith	Liberal
4th	1878–1882	William Elliott	Conservative
5th	1882–1887	James Fleming	Liberal
6th	1887–1891	William Armstrong McCulla	Conservative
7th	1891–1892	Joseph Featherston	Liberal
7th	1892–1896	Joseph Featherston	Liberal
8th	1896–1900	Joseph Featherston	Liberal
9th	1900–1904	Richard Blain	Conservative
10th	1904–1908	Richard Blain	Conservative
11th	1908–1911	Richard Blain	Conservative
12th	1911–1917	Richard Blain	Conservative
13th	1917–1921	Samuel Charters	Government (Unionist)
14th	1921–1925	Samuel Charters	Conservative
15th	1925–1926	Samuel Charters	Conservative
16th	1926–1930	Samuel Charters	Conservative
17th	1930–1935	Samuel Charters	Conservative
18th	1935–1940	Gordon Graydon	Conservative
19th	1940–1945	Gordon Graydon	National Government
20th	1945–1949	Gordon Graydon	Progressive Conservative
21st	1949–1953	Gordon Graydon	Progressive Conservative
22nd	1953–1954	Gordon Graydon	Progressive Conservative
22nd	1954–1957	John Pallett	Progressive Conservative
23rd	1957–1958	John Pallett	Progressive Conservative
24th	1958–1962	John Pallett	Progressive Conservative
25th	1962–1963	Bruce Beer	Liberal
26th	1963–1965	Bruce Beer	Liberal
27th	1965–1968	Bruce Beer	Liberal
Riding dissolved into Peel South and Peel—Dufferin—Simcoe

== Electoral history ==
1867 Canadian federal election
Party	Candidate	Votes	%
Conservative	John Hillyard Cameron	1,138	51.40
Unknown	Wally Barber	1,076	48.60
Total valid votes		2,214	100.0
Source(s) "Peel, Ontario (1867-1968)". History of Federal Ridings Since 1867. Library of Parliament.

1872 Canadian federal election
Party	Candidate	Votes	%	±%
Liberal	Robert Smith	1,261	50.32	–
Conservative	John Hillyard Cameron	1,245	49.68	-1.72
Total valid votes		2,506	100.0	
Liberal gain from Conservative		Swing		–
Source(s) "Peel, Ontario (1867-1968)". History of Federal Ridings Since 1867. Library of Parliament.

1874 Canadian federal election
Party	Candidate	Votes	%	±%
Liberal	Robert Smith	1,299	50.27	-0.05
Conservative	William Elliott	1,285	49.73	+0.05
Total valid votes		2,584	100.0	
Liberal hold		Swing		-0.05
Source(s) "Peel, Ontario (1867-1968)". History of Federal Ridings Since 1867. Library of Parliament. Archived from the original on 21 July 2015.

1878 Canadian federal election: Peel
Party	Candidate	Votes
Conservative	William Elliott	1,414
Liberal	Robert Smith	1,325

1882 Canadian federal election: Peel
Party	Candidate	Votes
Liberal	James Fleming	1,430
Unknown	Robert Barber	1,387

1887 Canadian federal election: Peel
Party	Candidate	Votes
Conservative	William Armstrong McCulla	1,711
Liberal	James Fleming	1,668

1891 Canadian federal election: Peel
Party	Candidate	Votes
Liberal	Joseph Featherston	1,667
Conservative	William Armstrong McCulla	1,613

By-election: On election being declared void, 11 February 1892 : Peel
Party	Candidate	Votes
Liberal	Joseph Featherston	acclaimed

1896 Canadian federal election: Peel
Party	Candidate	Votes
Liberal	Joseph Featherston	1,891
Conservative	A. F. Campbell	1,425

1900 Canadian federal election: Peel
Party	Candidate	Votes
Conservative	Richard Blain	1,705
Liberal	Joseph Featherston	1,592

1904 Canadian federal election: Peel
Party	Candidate	Votes
Conservative	Richard Blain	2,640
Liberal	W. E. Milner	2,524

1908 Canadian federal election: Peel
Party	Candidate	Votes
Conservative	Richard Blain	2,758
Liberal	Edward George Graham	2,469

1911 Canadian federal election: Peel
Party	Candidate	Votes
Conservative	Richard Blain	2,656
Liberal	William James Lowe	2,340

1917 Canadian federal election: Peel
Party	Candidate	Votes
Government (Unionist)	Samuel Charters	4,751
Opposition (Laurier Liberals)	Benjamin Petch	2,499

1921 Canadian federal election: Peel
Party	Candidate	Votes
Conservative	Samuel Charters	4,892
Liberal	William James Lowe	3,732
Progressive	Herbert J. W. Taylor	3,350

1925 Canadian federal election: Peel
Party	Candidate	Votes
Conservative	Samuel Charters	7,047
Liberal	William Ruston Perci Parker	6,546

1926 Canadian federal election: Peel
Party	Candidate	Votes
Conservative	Samuel Charters	7,002
Liberal	William James Lowe	6,294

1930 Canadian federal election: Peel
Party	Candidate	Votes
Conservative	Samuel Charters	7,112
Liberal	William James Lowe	6,847

1935 Canadian federal election: Peel
Party	Candidate	Votes
Conservative	Gordon Graydon	7,132
Liberal	William James Lowe	6,962
Co-operative Commonwealth	Joseph Maund	1,036
Reconstruction	John Bertram Dingwall	842

1940 Canadian federal election: Peel
Party	Candidate	Votes
National Government	Gordon Graydon	8,486
Liberal	George R. Farr	7,638

1945 Canadian federal election: Peel
Party	Candidate	Votes
Progressive Conservative	Gordon Graydon	10,357
Liberal	Stanley George Harmer	5,489
Co-operative Commonwealth	Robert Craig Smeaton	1,788

1949 Canadian federal election: Peel
Party	Candidate	Votes
Progressive Conservative	Gordon Graydon	10,570
Liberal	Stanley G. Harmer	7,788
Co-operative Commonwealth	Charles Donson Jenkins	3,043

1953 Canadian federal election: Peel
Party	Candidate	Votes
Progressive Conservative	Gordon Graydon	13,487
Liberal	Alfred Joseph Clifford O'Marra	9,263
Co-operative Commonwealth	James Adams	2,560

By-election: On Mr. Graydon's death, 22 March 1954: Peel
Party	Candidate	Votes
Progressive Conservative	John Pallett	13,500
Liberal	Alfred Joseph Clifford O'Marra	8,944
Co-operative Commonwealth	Lloyd Hartis Gane	1,985

1957 Canadian federal election: Peel
Party	Candidate	Votes
Progressive Conservative	John Pallett	19,818
Liberal	Robert Speck	10,467
Co-operative Commonwealth	John R. W. Whitehouse	3,418
Social Credit	Neil Carmichael	913

1958 Canadian federal election: Peel
Party	Candidate	Votes
Progressive Conservative	John Pallett	23,379
Liberal	Bob Fasken	10,357
Co-operative Commonwealth	John R. W. Whitehouse	3,848
Social Credit	Neil Carmichael	640

1962 Canadian federal election: Peel
Party	Candidate	Votes
Liberal	Bruce Beer	21,221
Progressive Conservative	John Pallett	19,238
New Democratic	Patrick Lawlor	8,341
Social Credit	David Astle	611

1963 Canadian federal election: Peel
Party	Candidate	Votes
Liberal	Bruce Beer	28,009
Progressive Conservative	John Fox	15,921
New Democratic	Patrick Lawlor	8,836
Social Credit	Ronald Gordon Sibbald	354

1965 Canadian federal election: Peel
Party	Candidate	Votes
Liberal	Bruce Beer	29,057
Progressive Conservative	Ron Searle	17,955
New Democratic	Keith Woollard	13,404
Social Credit	Ronald G. Sibbald	551

== See also ==
- List of Canadian electoral districts
- Historical federal electoral districts of Canada
