= John Hillyard Cameron =

Canadian politician (1817–1876)

John Hillyard Cameron QC
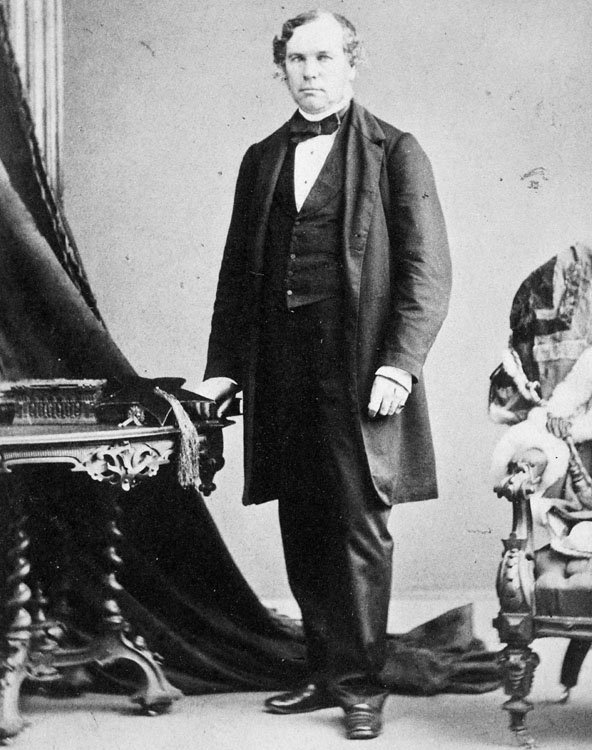

Member of the Legislative Assembly of the Province of Canada
- In office 1846–1851
- In office 1854–1857
- In office 1861–1866

Member of the Canadian Parliament for Peel
- In office 1867–1872
- Succeeded by: Robert Smith

Member of the Canadian Parliament for Cardwell
- In office 1872–1876
- Preceded by: Thomas Roberts Ferguson
- Succeeded by: Dalton McCarthy

Personal details
- Born: April 14, 1817 Blendecques, France
- Died: November 14, 1876 (aged 59) Toronto, Ontario
- Party: Conservative

John Hillyard Cameron, QC (April 14, 1817 – November 14, 1876) was an Ontario lawyer, businessman and political figure. He was a Conservative Member of Parliament representing Peel from 1867 to 1872 and Cardwell from 1872 until his death.

He was born in Blendecques, France in 1817. His father was a soldier in the 79th Highlanders who served in France during the Napoleonic Wars. In 1825, he came with his family to Kingston in Upper Canada. He studied at Kilkenny College in Ireland and Upper Canada College. He then studied law with Henry John Boulton. During the Upper Canada Rebellion, he served with the Queen's Rangers. In 1839, he was called to the bar in Upper Canada and entered a law practice in Toronto, Ontario. In 1846, he became a Queen's Counsel. Cameron also served on Toronto city council from 1846 to 1847, from 1851 to 1852 and 1854 to 1855. In 1860, he served as treasurer for the Law Society of Upper Canada. In 1869, he was also called to the Quebec bar.

In 1846, he was chosen as solicitor general for Upper Canada and was elected to the 2nd Parliament of the Province of Canada in a by-election for Cornwall. In 1847, he was appointed to the Executive Council. He served in the Legislative Assembly until Confederation, except for the 4th and 6th parliaments, when he did not run. He supported representation by population and opposed the introduction of an elected Legislative Council. In 1856, he helped stir up controversy in the wake of the death of Robert Corrigan in Lotbinière, Quebec; this helped undermine the government of Allan MacNab which led to the rise of Sir John A. Macdonald as leader of the Conservatives. He supported Confederation but would have preferred a legislative union. He was elected to represent Peel in the House of Commons in 1867. In 1872, he ran in both Peel and Cardwell, being elected in the latter.

He was a director of the Toronto and Guelph Railway, which was later absorbed by the Grand Trunk Railway, helped found the Canada Life Assurance Company in 1847, was president of the Provincial Insurance Company and chairman of the board in Canada of the Edinburgh Life Insurance Company. He was also involved in the incorporation of a number of companies in the Toronto area including the Western Assurance Company in 1851 and the Toronto and Georgian Bay Canal Company in 1856. He suffered extensive financial losses near the end of 1857 as a result of a financial panic and economic depression; he promised to make good on his debts, which left him financially strained for the remainder of his life.

He was a loyal follower of the Church of England and tried to defend its interests, including the revenue from the clergy reserves. He served on the council of Trinity College, an Anglican university at the time; he also was a professor of law at the college and served as chancellor from 1863 until his death. In 1856, he joined the Orange Order and served as grand master in Canada from 1859 to 1870.

He suffered a heart attack and died while in Toronto in 1876.

== Footnotes ==
Academic offices
Preceded by The Hon. Sir John Beverley Robinson	Chancellor of the University of Trinity College; 1863–1876	Succeeded by The Hon. George William Allan
