= John Smith (Peel MPP) =

Scottish-born Ontario businessman and political figure

Ontario MPP
- In office 1893–1908
- Preceded by: Kenneth Chisholm
- Succeeded by: Samuel Charters
- Constituency: Peel

Personal details
- Born: October 27, 1831; Inverness, Scotland
- Died: March 5, 1909 (aged 77); Brampton, Ontario
- Political party: Liberal
- Occupation: Auctioneer

John Smith (October 27, 1831 – March 5, 1909) was a Scottish-born Ontario businessman and political figure. He represented Peel in the Legislative Assembly of Ontario from 1893 to 1908 as a Liberal member.

He was born in Inverness in 1831, the son of Andrew Smith, and came to Peel County, Upper Canada with his family in 1832. He was educated in Chinguacousy Township. Smith was an auctioneer and served on the town council for Brampton. He was elected to the provincial legislature in an 1893 by-election held after Kenneth Chisholm was appointed county registrar.

Smith died of pneumonia in 1909.
