= Samuel Charters (politician) =

Canadian politician (1863-1943)

Member of the Canadian Parliament for Peel
- In office 1917–1935
- Preceded by: Richard Blain
- Succeeded by: Gordon Graydon

19th Mayor of Brampton
- In office 1911–1912
- Preceded by: Thomas Thauburn
- Succeeded by: T.W. Duggan

Ontario MPP
- In office 1908–1913
- Preceded by: John Smith
- Succeeded by: James Robinson Fallis
- Constituency: Peel

Personal details
- Born: May 18, 1863 Chinguacousy Township, Canada West
- Died: April 21, 1943 (aged 79) Brampton, Ontario, Canada
- Party: Provincial Conservative (1908-1913); Federal Unionist (1917-1921); Federal Conservative (1921-1935)
- Spouse: Jane Ellen Pierson
- Profession: Newspaper publisher

Samuel Charters (May 18, 1863 – April 21, 1943) was an Ontario newspaper publisher and political figure. He represented Peel in the Legislative Assembly of Ontario as a Conservative member from 1908 to 1913 and in the House of Commons of Canada from 1917 to 1935 as a Unionist and then Conservative member.

== Background ==
He was born in Chinguacousy Township, Canada West, the son of Francis Charters, and was educated in Brampton, Ontario. He married Jane Ellen Pierson in 1887. In 1890, he took over the operation of the Brampton Conservator. He was president of the Charters Publishing Company. He died in Brampton at the age of 79.

== Politics ==
Charters was an unsuccessful candidate for a seat in the provincial assembly in 1902. He retired from provincial politics in 1913 due to illness. Charters served as chief opposition whip in the House of Commons from 1917 to 1930. He retired from politics one last time in 1935. Charters also served as mayor of Brampton in 1907 and from 1911 to 1912 and as registrar of deeds for Peel County.
