= Thomas Laird Kennedy =

Canadian politician

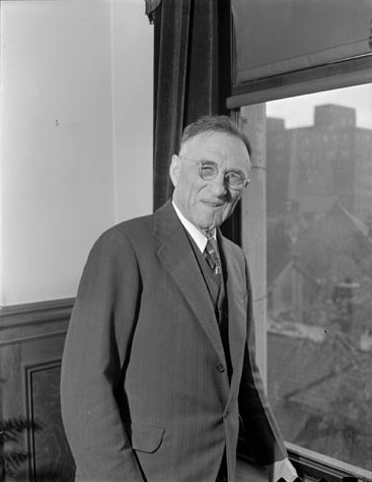
- Kennedy in 1948

15th Premier of Ontario
- In office October 19, 1948 – May 4, 1949
- Monarch: George VI
- Lieutenant Governor: Ray Lawson
- Preceded by: George Drew
- Succeeded by: Leslie Frost

Ontario MPP
- In office October 6, 1937 – February 13, 1959
- Preceded by: Duncan Marshall
- Succeeded by: Bill Davis
- In office October 20, 1919 – June 19, 1934
- Preceded by: William James Lowe
- Succeeded by: Duncan Marshall
- Constituency: Peel

Personal details
- Born: August 15, 1878 Dixie, Toronto Township, Ontario (now part of Mississauga, Ontario)
- Died: February 13, 1959 (aged 80) Toronto Township (Mississauga), Ontario
- Resting place: Dixie Union Cemetery, Mississauga
- Party: Ontario PC Party
- Parent(s): John Robertson Kennedy and Mary Elgie
- Cabinet: Minister of Agriculture (1930–1934 & 1943–1953)

Thomas Laird Kennedy (August 15, 1878 – February 13, 1959) was a politician in Ontario, Canada, and served briefly as the 15th premier of Ontario, from 1948 to 1949. He was first elected as the Conservative member for Peel in the 1919 provincial election, after serving in World War I in the Canadian Cyclist Battalion. He had been a longtime resident of Streetsville (now part of Mississauga), Ontario, where he was master of River Park Masonic Lodge in 1908 and 1909.

Kennedy was first appointed Minister of Agriculture in 1930 by Premier Howard Ferguson and continued in the position under Premier George S. Henry until the Conservative government's defeat in the 1934 provincial election. Kennedy was a casualty in the election losing his seat to the landslide that elected the government of Liberal Mitchell Hepburn. Kennedy returned to the legislature in the 1937 election and returned to government when the newly renamed Progressive Conservatives won the 1943 election.

The new premier, George Drew, returned Kennedy to the position of Minister of Agriculture he had held a decade previously. Drew moved to federal politics in 1948 after losing his own seat in the 1948 provincial election which, nevertheless, re-elected the Tory government.

Following Drew's departure, Kennedy was named interim leader of the Ontario Progressive Conservative Party, and thus also Premier of Ontario. He remained so for seven months until the party could hold its April 27, 1949 leadership convention. The convention elected Leslie Frost as the new party leader, who succeeded Kennedy as Premier on May 4, 1949. Kennedy remained as Agriculture Minister until 1953, when he stepped down from Cabinet at the age of 75. He remained a member of the legislature until his death in 1959.

== Legacy ==
Thomas L. Kennedy Secondary School in Mississauga, which first opened to students in 1953, was named in his honour. It is the oldest school of its kind in the city that is still in operation.

Tomken Road is named after him, in the form of a portmanteau. There is no evidence that Kennedy Road in Mississauga, Brampton, and Caledon is named for him. Rather it is believed to be named for a family that lived on the route. Kennedy is related to the Kennedy settlers in Scarborough Township, for whom (namely James Kennedy) Kennedy Road in eastern Toronto and York Region is named.

His nephew Douglas Kennedy was a Tory MPP from 1967 to 1985.
