= Richard Blain =

Canadian politician (1857-1926)

The Honourable Richard Blain
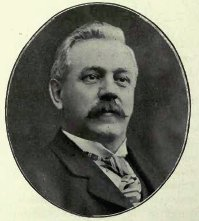

Member of Parliament for Peel
- In office 1900–1917
- Preceded by: Joseph Featherston
- Succeeded by: Samuel Charters

Canadian Senator from Ontario
- In office 1917–1926
- Appointed by: Robert Borden

Personal details
- Born: December 8, 1857 Vienna, Canada West
- Died: November 27, 1926 (aged 68) Brampton, Ontario, Canada
- Party: Conservative

Richard Blain (December 8, 1857 – November 27, 1926) was a Canadian politician.

== Background ==
Born in Vienna, Canada West, the son of Isaac Blain and Mary Brodrick, Blain was a hardware merchant. In 1888, he married Hattie James. He was a member of the Brampton Town Council for ten years. He was also Reeve and Deputy Reeve of Brampton and Warden of Peel County. He was first elected to the House of Commons of Canada for the electoral district of Peel at the general elections of 1900. A Conservative, he was re-elected in 1904, 1908, and 1911. In 1917, he was summoned to the Senate of Canada representing the senatorial division of Peel, Ontario on the advice of Prime Minister Robert Borden. He served until his death in 1926 in Brampton.
