= Killing of Robert Corrigan =

19th century farmer and murder victim

Robert Corrigan, (c. 1816 or 1817 – 19 October 1855) was an Irish-Canadian who was murdered by a group of men in Saint-Sylvestre, Lower Canada. Corrigan converted from the Roman Catholic faith to the Anglican faith which caused him to be disliked by the majority-Catholic community of Saint-Sylvestre. The search for the mob was hindered by the townspeople, but several months after his murder the men suspected to be part of the mob were voluntarily arrested. At the criminal trial, the men were acquitted. The jury's decision in the trial angered Protestants in Upper Canada, who used Corrigan's death to support claims that Catholics held an outsized amount of power in Lower Canada and the Province of Canada.

== Life and family ==
Corrigan was born in 1816 or 1817 in County Tyrone, Northern Ireland. His father was Patrick Corrigan and his mother was Grace McNult; he was their fourth child, and he had seven siblings. He married Catherine Mortin and they had three children. Corrigan followed the Catholic beliefs of his parents at the beginning of his life, but converted to Anglicanism at an unknown time.

Corrigan's family immigrated to Canada in 1831. He bought land in Saint-Sylvestre, Lower Canada, in 1852 or 1853. He was disliked by the Irish community in the town because he had converted to Anglicanism and ridiculed the Catholics of his former faith. He frequently challenged his enemies to tests of strength.

== Death and investigation ==
On 17 October 1855, Corrigan was a judge for animals at an agricultural fair. His judging decisions at the fair angered the Irish townspeople and seven or eight people beat Corrigan with sticks. Two days later he died from his injuries.

Many witnesses, who were Catholic, refused to cooperate with the investigation. One group of people planned to ambush the coroner while he was transporting the body, to destroy the corpse. On 22 October, Corrigan's body was transported to the nearby town of Leeds with 300 Protestants escorting the body in view of the public. The inquest started the following day. The jurors of the inquest unanimously agreed that eleven suspects should be indicted for murder. Corrigan's body was buried on 27 October in Leeds.

The bailiff of Leeds, William Harrison, searched Saint-Sylvestre for the suspects, but they were hidden by the townspeople. The Lower Canadian government offered an $800 reward for the group's arrest, then $400 for the arrest of any of the accused. Frustrated by the lack of arrests in December, the government sent a military detachment of 130 men to help in the search, but they were also unsuccessful. On 10 January, several of the indicted men voluntarily gave themselves up. The accused were confident that they would not be convicted because witnesses could not identify who gave the fatal blow to Corrigan.

Their trial took place in Quebec City. The judge was Jean-François-Joseph Duval from the Court of the Queen's Bench of Lower Canada. Every member of the jury was Catholic. The jury acquitted the men on 18 February.

== Legacy ==
Protestants in Upper Canada were angered by the jury's decision that the defendants were innocent. John Hillyard Cameron proposed a resolution in the Parliament of Canada that Duval's instructions to the jury before they began their deliberations should be published, claiming that the instructions given were unusual and biased towards an innocent verdict. When the resolution passed, the coalition government of Allan MacNab and Étienne-Paschal Taché refused to publish the instructions. Faced with internal opposition from his political allies over this decision, MacNab resigned as premier and John A. Macdonald formed a new coalition government with Taché.

This event caused Protestants in Upper Canada to believe that Catholics in Lower Canada would protect people of their religion so long as the majority of the population was Catholic. The Orange Order used the event to encourage prejudices against Catholics, increasing sectarianism in Canada. William Lyon Mackenzie cited the Corrigan trial as an example of Lower Canadian dominance in the Canadian political system and used the event as a reason to have the dissolution of the Province of Canada.
