= William Elliott (Peel MP) =

Canadian politician (1837–1888)

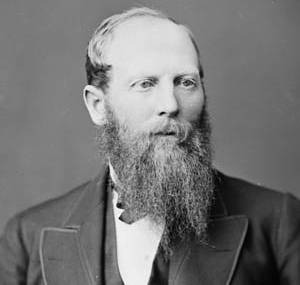
William Elliott Source: Library and Archives Canada

William Elliott (April 21, 1837 – March 2, 1888) was a farmer, merchant and political figure in Ontario, Canada. He represented Peel in the House of Commons of Canada from 1878 to 1882 as a Conservative member.

He was born in Toronto Township, Upper Canada, the son of William Elliott and Frances Hamilton, Irish immigrants. He married Ann Jane Jackson in 1863. Elliott served as deputy reeve and reeve for Toronto Township. He was an unsuccessful candidate for the same seat in the House of Commons in 1874. His farm was situated in Meadowvale, a community in Toronto Township. Elliott was a member of the local Orange Lodge.
