= Kenneth Chisholm =

Canadian businessman and politician

Ontario MPP
- In office 1873–1892
- Preceded by: John Coyne
- Succeeded by: John Smith
- Constituency: Peel

Personal details
- Born: March 17, 1829 Toronto Township, Upper Canada
- Died: September 26, 1906 (aged 77) Brampton, Ontario
- Party: Liberal
- Occupation: Businessman

Kenneth Chisholm (March 17, 1829 – September 26, 1906) was an Ontario businessman and political figure. He represented Peel in the Legislative Assembly of Ontario as a Liberal member from 1873 to 1892.

He was born in Toronto Township (now part of Mississauga) in Upper Canada in 1829. He started work as a clerk and then as a grain salesman in Brampton. He went into business for himself in Milton but returned to Brampton and, with a partner, bought out his former employer. He served as postmaster from 1855 to 1873 and served several terms as reeve. He was elected to the Ontario legislature in an 1873 by-election held after John Coyne died. He was also a director of the Central Bank of Canada. He owned quarries in the Credit River valley which supplied stone used to build the Ontario Legislature in Toronto. In 1880, he invested in the local Haggert Foundry and became vice-president. However, by 1891, both the bank and the foundry had failed and Chisholm was forced to sell his mansion, now a Royal Canadian Legion hall in Brampton. He was appointed registrar for Peel County in 1892 and held that post until his death in Brampton in 1906.

The Township of Chisholm in Nipissing District was named after him.

== Electoral history ==
Ontario provincial by-election, December 29, 1873: Peel Death of John Coyne
Party	Candidate	Votes	%	±%
Liberal	Kenneth Chisholm	1,324	55.17	+6.52
Conservative	S. White	1,076	44.83	−6.52
Total valid votes		2,400	100.0	+10.24
Liberal gain from Conservative		Swing		+6.52
Source: History of the Electoral Districts, Legislatures and Ministries of the Province of Ontario

1875 Ontario general election: Peel
Party	Candidate	Votes	%	±%
Liberal	Kenneth Chisholm	1,349	51.98	−3.18
Conservative	J.W. Beynon	1,246	48.02	+3.18
Total valid votes		2,595	72.95	
Eligible voters		3,557		
Liberal hold		Swing		−3.18
Source: Elections Ontario

1879 Ontario general election: Peel
Party	Candidate	Votes	%	±%
Liberal	Kenneth Chisholm	1,519	52.69	+0.70
Conservative	Mr. McCulla	1,364	47.31	−0.70
Total valid votes		2,883	76.09	+3.13
Eligible voters		3,789		
Liberal hold		Swing		+0.70
Source: Elections Ontario
