= Gordon Graydon =

Canadian politician (1896–1953)

Member of the Canadian Parliament for Peel
- In office October 14, 1935 – September 19, 1953
- Preceded by: Samuel Charters
- Succeeded by: John Pallett

Personal details
- Born: December 7, 1896 Snelgrove, Ontario, Canada
- Died: September 19, 1953 (aged 56) Toronto Township (now Mississauga), Ontario, Canada
- Party: Progressive Conservative
- Profession: Lawyer

Gordon Graydon (December 7, 1896 – September 19, 1953) was a Canadian politician who served as the Member of Parliament (MP) for Peel from 1935 to 1953.

== Background ==
Graydon received his early education at S.S. No. 6 Chinguacousy in the County of Peel, Ontario. He attended Brampton High School and was a student at University of Toronto in political science. He graduated from Osgoode Hall Law School in 1924. He then became a partner of the late Justice William Raney, one-time Attorney General of Ontario.

In 1933, at the age of 36, Graydon became the President of the Peel County Conservative Association. He was the youngest man ever to hold that position. In 1934, he helped rejuvenate the Conservative Party of Ontario by forming Young Conservative Clubs at a time when the party's existence was threatened.

He was a member of Grace United Church, Brampton, of several local lodges, including Campbell's Cross Loyal Orange Lodge of the Board of Regents of Victoria College and of the Peel War Records Board.

A high school in Mississauga has been named in his honour. A senior public (junior high) school in Brampton, Ontario also bears his name.

== Politics ==
He was one of thirty-five Conservative candidates who survived the Liberal Party landslide of the 1935 federal election, winning Peel riding for his party.

Graydon was Opposition Leader in the House of Commons of Canada from 1943 to 1945 because John Bracken, the new leader of the Progressive Conservative Party of Canada, did not have a seat in the House and chose not to seek one until the 1945 federal election.

In 1945, he was Canadian delegate to the San Francisco World Conference, and delegate in London, representing Canada on the Preparatory Committee of the United Nations. He was Alternate Delegate for Canada at the UN's 1st General Assembly 1946, Parliamentary advisor to the Canadian Delegate to the UN General Assembly in 1950 and in New York, 1952.

He remained a Member of Parliament for Peel until his death in 1953.
