= William Armstrong McCulla =

Canadian politician

William Armstrong McCulla (1837 – July 1, 1923) was an industrialist, building contractor and political figure in Ontario, Canada. He represented Peel in the House of Commons of Canada from 1887 to 1891 as a Conservative member.

He was born in Sligo, Caledon Township, Upper Canada, the son of John McCulla, who came to Canada in 1849 and Marie Louise Beatty, and was educated in Ireland and Canada. McCulla married Elizabeth McBride. He served 13 years on the town council for Brampton, serving three years as reeve and three years as mayor. McCulla also served as warden for Peel County. He served as postmaster for Brampton from 1892 to 1923. He died in Brampton at the age of 86.
